= Timeline of SOE French Section =

Part of the history of the Special Operations Executive

The SOE F Section timeline lists the significant events in the history of Section F (France) of the Special Operations Executive (SOE). SOE was a clandestine organization of the United Kingdom during World War II. The purpose of SOE was to conduct espionage, sabotage, and reconnaissance in countries occupied by the Axis powers. SOE agents allied themselves with resistance groups and supplied them with weapons and equipment parachuted in from England. Section F was responsible for many of SOE's activities in France which was occupied by Nazi Germany.

SOE F Section sent about 470 agents to France from 1941 to 1944, of whom about 40 were women. The Valençay SOE Memorial lists 91 men and 13 women agents who were killed, executed, or died in concentration camps during the war. SOE agents in France were organized into networks which usually consisted of an organiser (the leader), a courier, and a wireless operator. Agents arrived in France by parachute, clandestine air flight, or, in a few cases, by ship or boat. Dates of arrivals and departures below reflect that most operations took place about midnight. Supplies and weapons were air-dropped. A task of agents was identifying suitable landing sites, usually farm fields, for parachuters, supplies, and aircraft

SOE had two sections dealing with France. SOE F Section is the subject of this article. SOE RF Section was controlled by Charles de Gaulle and his supporters. It was similar in size to F Section. The two sections were operationally independent although sharing logistics and transportation.

== 1940 ==
19 June

British Prime Minister Winston Churchill wrote a memorandum proposing to create an organization "to coordinate all action by way of subversion and sabotage against the enemy overseas. The army of Nazi Germany was in the process of occupying many countries of Europe, including France which would initially be divided into the Occupied Zone and the unoccupied or "Free Zone." (Vichy France)

France in World War II.

22 July

The Special Operations Executive was created with Hugh Dalton, the Minister of Economic Warfare, appointed at its head. Dalton said that Churchill told him to "set Europe ablaze."

== 1941 ==
=== April 1941 ===
April

Vera Atkins joined SOE and was appointed the intelligence officer for Section F. Romanian born, she became "the most powerful personality in SOE."

=== May 1941 ===
May

Giliana Balmaceda was the first female SOE agent to be sent to occupied France. A citizen of Chile, she traveled legally to Vichy France and collected documents such as ration and identification cards that could be forged by the SOE for its undercover agents in France.

5 May

Wireless operator Georges Bégué was the first male SOE F section agent in France and the first to arrive by parachute. He landed in Indre Department. Headquartered in Châteauroux, he set up radio communications and met agents who followed him.

=== June 1941 ===
13 June

The first airdrop of weapons to the French Resistance took place, arranged by Georges Bégue and Pierre de Vomécourt. Two CLE Canisters were parachuted onto the estate of Philippe de Vomécourt near Limoges. The Vomécourt brothers created the first two SOE networks (or reseau) in France, named Autogiro and Ventriloquist.

=== August 1941 ===
6/7 August

SOE agents Jacques Vaillant de Guélis and G.C.G Turck parachuted into France. Turck was injured and captured on landing; de Guélis spent a month in France recruiting agents, collecting documents, and preparing the way for the arrival of Virginia Hall.

23 August

American Virginia Hall departed England for Vichy France as a SOE agent. Her cover was as a correspondent for the New York Post. The United States was not yet at war with Germany and Americans could travel to and from France. Hall was the first female SOE agent to live and work in France for an extended period of time.

=== September 1941 ===
September

Maurice Buckmaster was appointed the leader of SOE F Section. At this time the SOE headquarters staff of Section F consisted of eight people which would be increased to 24 during the next year and many more thereafter. Nicolas Bodington became Buckmaster's deputy.

4/5 September

The first clandestine landing of a Westland Lysander airplane in support of SOE F Section took place on a farm field in Indre Department. the Lysander dropped off SOE agent Gerald Morel and picked up Jacques Vaillant de Guélis. The Lysander transported agents and reports back and forth from England to France and vice versa.

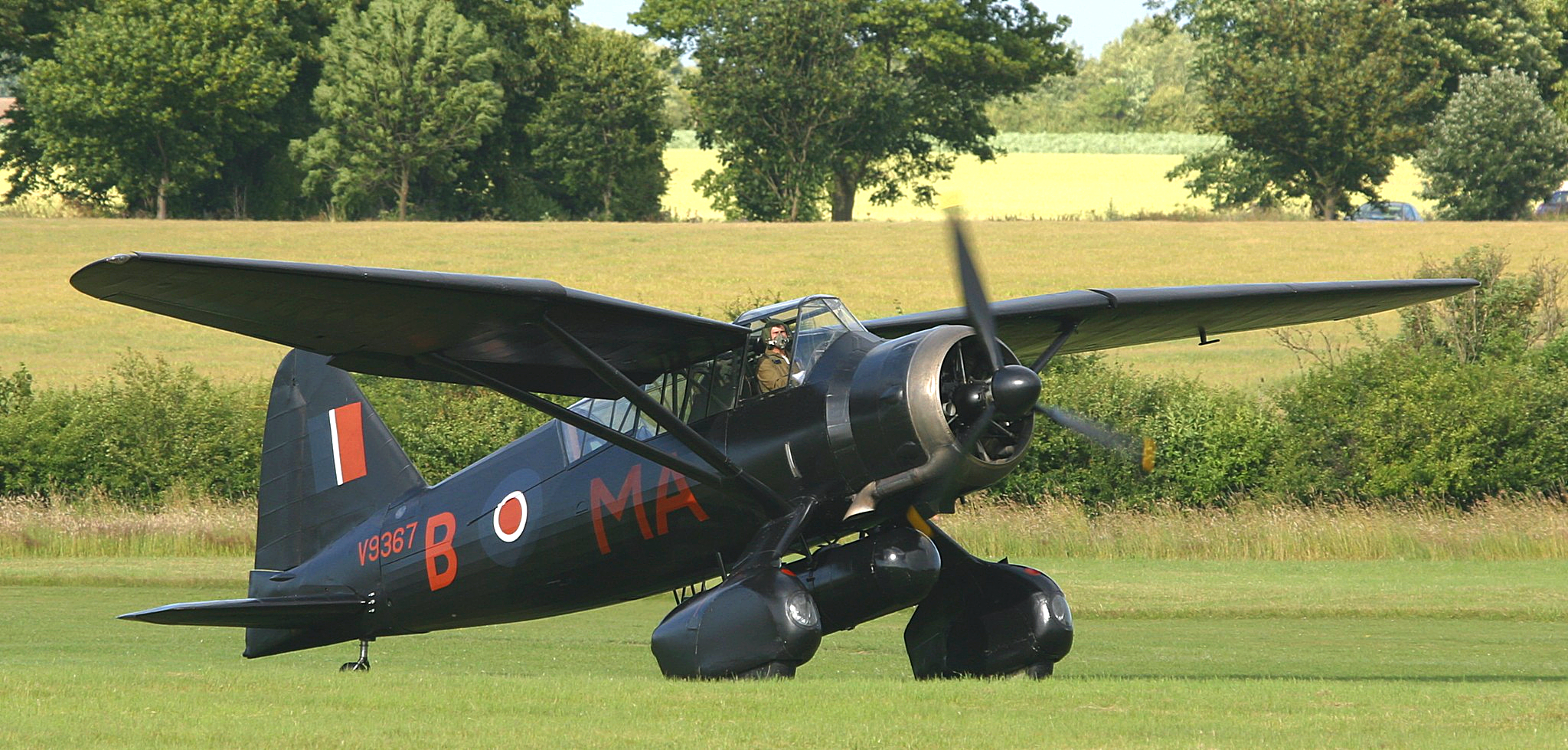
The Westland Lysander landed on farm fields and ferried SOE agents, arms, and equipment back and forth from France to England.

6/7 September

SOE agents Benjamin Cowburn, Michael Trotobas, Victor Gerson, George Langelaan, Jean du Puy, and André Bloch parachuted into France at night near Châteauroux. They were met by Bégué, Max Hymans, and a local farmer, Octave Chanteraine. Cowburn, Trotobas, and Gerson would become important SOE agents.

19/20 September

SOE agent Francis Basin arrived in France by clandestine boat and set up operations in Cannes on the French Riviera. He came into contact with an organization called Carte headed by an artist named André Girard who claimed to have organized a large group of resisters to German control. Basin's reports on Carte gave SOE hope that it could be used as the spearhead of a large resistance movement to the Germans.

=== October 1941 ===
20 October

In what was called the "mousetrap," Vichy Police learned of a Marseille safehouse called the Villa des Bois and arrested about 10 SOE agents who visited the Villa.

24 October

As part of the "mousetrap," Georges Bégué was arrested in Marseille and in an unrelated action, a routine document check, Michael Trotabas was arrested in Chateauroux. The arrests left Virginia Hall in Lyon as nearly the only SOE agent remaining at large in Vichy France and she had no wireless operator for communication with SOE headquarters.

=== November 1941 ===
17 November

In Paris Nazi spy catcher Sergeant Hugo Bleicher led German police in arresting members of a Franco-Polish resistance group, Interallié. Among those arrested was Mathilde Carré, nicknamed "the Cat." In exchange for money and freedom, Carré agreed to work for Bleicher and helped him arrest additional members of the group. Interallié was destroyed.

=== December 1941 ===
26 December

His wireless operator having been arrested, Pierre de Vomécourt had no means of communicating with SOE headquarters in London. In Paris he was introduced to Mathilde Carré who, unknown to him, had become a double agent, working for the Germans. She told him she had access to a wireless. The wireless was controlled by the Germans and they began transmitting, receiving, and reading Vomécourt's messages.

== 1942 ==
=== January 1942 ===
9/10 January

Peter Churchill landed by submarine at Miramar on the French Riviera, to evaluate the Carte network. Carte's leader, André Girard, claimed that his organization could, with SOE help, undertake sabotage and guerilla warfare and eventually field an army of 300,000 men to resist German control of France. Assistance to Carte became F Section's top priority in 1942.

=== February 1942 ===
11 February

Wireless operator Andre Bloch was executed by the Germans at Mont-Valérien, the first SOE agent in France to be executed. Pierre de Vomécourt said that it was obvious that Bloch was Jewish and sending him as an agent to France showed the ignorance of SOE about wartime life in France.

26/27 February

Pierre de Vomécourt and Mathilde Carré departed France by Royal Navy motor torpedo boat to return to England. De Vomécourt had realized she was a German agent and persuaded her to go to England with him. She gained the approval of her German handlers for the trip, because she would learn much about SOE and report to them upon her return to France. Instead, Carré was imprisoned in England for the remainder of the war.

=== April 1942 ===
25 April

Pierre de Vomécourt was arrested by Hugo Bleicher in Paris. He had been parachuted back into France on 1 April. Vomécourt persuaded the Germans to treat him and his followers as prisoners of war, rather than spies, and he spent the rest of the war imprisoned in Colditz Castle. His arrest, and the destruction of his Autogiro network, left SOE without any working networks in France, although Virginia Hall remained active in Lyon.

=== July 1942 ===
1/2 July

English painter Brian Stonehouse, a wireless operator, parachuted into occupied France near the city of Tours, Indre-et-Loire, in the Loire Valley. Stonehouse was captured in October 1942 along with courier Blanche Charlet, and spent the rest of the war in German prisons, including Natzweiler-Struthof concentration camp. Charlet later escaped and was evacuated to England.

15 July

Eleven SOE agents, including Michael Trotobas and Georges Bégué, escaped from a French prison in the Dordogne region. They made their way to Lyon where Virginia Hall helped them cross the border into Spain and return to England.

29/30 July

SOE F Section's second on command, Nicolas Bodington, landed on the French Riviera via clandestine boat. Landed with him was Carte's second-in-command, Henri Frager and courier Yvonne Rudellat. Bodington's task was to assess the viability of Carte as a resistance organization and the assistance needed from SOE. Ruddelat would become involved with the Prosper network as a courier and saboteur.

Claude de Baissac parachuted with Harry Peulevé near Nimes. Dropped from too low an altitude, Peulevé broke his leg. Despite a sprained ankle, de Baissac continued with his mission to set up the Scientist Network and to conduct espionage at Bordeaux. After a partial recovery, Puelevé, still limping, walked across the Pyrenees to Spain and returned to England in November.

=== August 1942 ===
27/28 August

John Starr arrived by parachute in a field near Valence, Drôme, in Vichy France on his first mission. Peter Churchill arrived by parachute near Montpellier on his third mission. His job was to liaison with Carte and his network was called Spindle. Both were highly regarded agents.

=== September 1942 ===
12 September

Nicolas Bodington returned to England from the French Riviera and presented a favorable report on the Carte network and its potential as a resistance organization. SOE began to plan to provide substantial assistance in money, arms, and supplies to Carte.

17/18 September

Michael Trotobas parachuted back into France, landing near Montargis. Trotobas went to Lille where he organized the Farmer network and led many sabotage missions.

25 September

Andrée Borrel and Lise de Baissac arrived in German-occupied France by parachute early in the morning of 25 September at a field near Mer, Loir-et-Cher (a parachute jump the previous night was aborted due to the signals in the drop zone being incorrect), after having left England late on the night of 24 September in an RAF Whitley. They were the first SOE female agents to be parachuted into France. Borrel went to Paris to become a key figure in the Prosper network. De Baissac went to Poitiers where, working mostly by herself, she supported several agents and networks.

=== October 1942 ===
1/2 October

Francis Suttill arrived by parachute near Vendôme and proceeded to Paris to establish the Prosper (also called Physician) network. Suttill was highly regarded by SOE. Prosper was to replace the now defunct Autogiro network as the most important SOE network in northern France. Andrée Borrel was Suttill's courier and his wireless operator was Gilbert Norman.

=== November 1942 ===
November

Poor security doomed the Carte network. Traveling by train to Paris, André Marsac's briefcase was stolen by a German agent. The briefcase contained the names and personal information about more than 200 Carte supporters. The Germans continued to observe Carte, but did not take immediate action to arrest those on the list.

3/4 November

George Starr and Odette Sansom arrived clandestinely by boat at night near Cannes, Alpes-Maritimes, on the Mediterranean coast of France. The return voyage carried John Starr out of France following his first mission, taking with him reports collected by Peter Churchill. George Starr would establish a network in southwestern France and Sansom would become Churchill's courier.

8 November

Allied forces invaded French colonies in North Africa and in consequence the Germans and Italians invaded and occupied previously un-occupied Vichy France. The German occupation made life for SOE agents in former Vichy France much more dangerous. However, most of Prosper's operations were in northern, occupied France.

13 November

Phillipe de Vomécourt was arrested by French police near Limoges and sentenced to 10 years in prison.

=== December 1942 ===
7/12 December

Claude de Baissac organized the Scientist network in Bordeaux with the all-important priority of gathering intelligence and carrying out sabotage against the submarine base there. De Baissac's planned sabotage was thwarted when British commandos simultaneously (without coordination within the British government) carried out Operation Frankton against the submarine base. Frankton was only partially successful, German security increased afterwards and sabotage by de Baissac became infeasible.

29/30 December

Jack Agazarian parachuted into France to join the Prosper Network as a second wireless operator. He was later joined by his wife Francine, a courier. They were one of only a few married couples working for SOE, but, although they both worked for Prosper, they had different jobs.

== 1943 ==
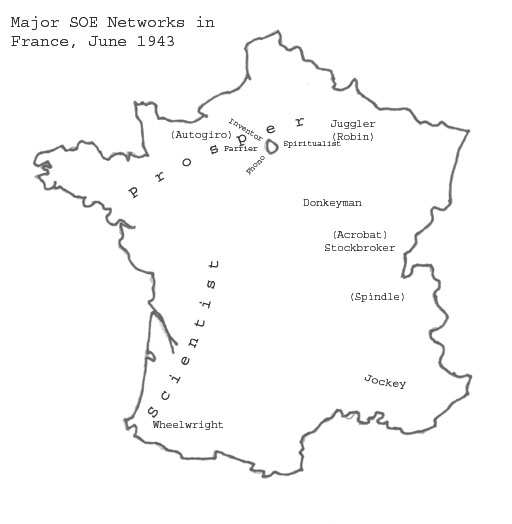
The most important networks of SOE in June 1943.

=== January 1943 ===
2 January

The Carte network was riven by internal controversy and finally split into factions headed by André Girard and Henri Frager. Peter Churchill, who was the liaison of Carte with SOE, favored Frager.

22 January

Henri Déricourt, a pilot, parachuted into France and went to Paris to work as the air movements officer for the Prosper and other networks. Based in Paris, Déricourt organized Lysander landings at clandestine air fields. Prior to World War II, Déricourt was friends with Nicolas Bodington who became SOE's Deputy Director and Karl Boemelburg who became the German Sicherheitsdienst (the SD, the SS security service) director in Paris.

=== March 1943 ===
23/24 March

Peter Churchill and Henri Frager of Carte returned to England for consultations with SOE by Lysander flight from near Compiègne. On the inward flight Francis Cammaerts arrived to take Churchill's place and was driven to Paris.

25 March

The German destruction of Carte commenced with the arrest of André Marsac in Paris which was followed by additional arrests. Francis Cammaerts, recently arrived, was appalled at the loose security of Carte and departed Paris for Annecy.

=== April 1943 ===
16 April

One day after Peter Churchill returned to France, he and his courier, Odette Sansom, were arrested by Hugo Bleicher in Saint-Jorioz near Annecy. Bleicher learned their location from arrested Carte members André Marsac and Roger Bardet. The Carte network in which SOE had invested so much hope was destroyed. The Prosper network of Francis Suttill became SOE's principal effort to foster resistance to the German occupation. Prosper was based in Paris. Churchill and Sansom would both survive the war in concentration camps.

18 April

With contacts from the ruins of the Interallié, Autogiro and Carte networks, Prosper had grown rapidly and its writ now extended "from the Ardennes to the Atlantic." However, in a first sign of worry, Prosper leader Francis Suttill sent a report to SOE saying that he distrusted former Carte official Henri Frager, now associated with Prosper.

22 April

The destruction of the Prosper network began with the arrest by the German SD of sisters Germaine and Madeleine Tambour in Paris. Both had been associated with Carte and also with Prosper. Francis Suttill attempted unsuccessfully to bribe the Germans for their release. Both were later executed. The sisters' apartment was a safe house and a letter box to pass along messages for SOE agents. A few days before the arrest, Benjamin Cowburn had commented to Suttill that too many people were going in and out of the apartment.

=== May 1943 ===
20/21 May

Francis Suttill returned to France after a week of consultations with SOE in London. He informed SOE that he believed the Germans had infiltrated the Prosper network because of the large number of arrests taking place. His mood was described as "jaded," a "show of nerves," and antagonistic about what he considered the failings of SOE headquarters.

=== June 1943 ===
15/16 June

Noor Inayat Khan, Diana Rowden, and Cecily Lefort arrived by air at a location north-east of Angers, Maine-et-Loire, in the Loire Valley, where they were met by Henri Déricourt. Inayat Khan would work with the Prosper network in Paris. Jack Agazarian left on the return flight to England. Agazarian had been accused by Suttill of being careless.

15/16 June

Canadian SOE agents Frank Pickersgill and John Kenneth Macalister had parachuted into France a few days earlier. They were met by Yvonne Rudelatt and Pierra Culioli, who were to drive them to Paris, but the two Canadians were taken into custody by the Germans in Dhuizon. After a car chase Rudelatt and Culioli were wounded and captured.

23 June

Andrée Borrel and Gilbert Norman, two of the three central figures of the Prosper network, were arrested by the Germans in Paris. Later that same day their leader Francis Suttill was arrested in a small hotel in Paris. Only Borrel and Norman were likely to have known his location.

In London temporarily, Jack Agazarian told SOE that Suttill believed the security of Henri Déricourt's air movements operation was poor. This was apparently the first of many reports by SOE agents expressing concern about Déricourt. Some reports called him a "traitor" although it was unclear to SOE in London whether that charge referred to Déricourt (code named "Gilbert") or Suttill's wireless operator, Gilbert Norman.

=== July 1943 ===
7 July

A wireless message ostensibly from Gilbert Norman in Paris confirmed that Suttill had been arrested. However, the message did not contain a secret security check inserted into all messages by operators to confirm their identity and to indicate they were not broadcasting under duress. Rather than question the provenance of the message, SOE commander Buckmaster replied, "You have forgotten your security check. Be more careful." The message had in fact been sent to SOE by the Germans.

Buckmaster's mistake permitted the Germans to play "funkspiel" (radio games) with Norman's wireless, receiving messages from SOE and sending false messages to SOE, a game they would play for the next few months with great success.

18 July

John Starr was wounded and captured by German Sicherheitsdienst (SD) in Dijon. He was tortured before being moved to Paris to SD headquarters at 84 Avenue Foch.

22/23 July

Nicolas Bodington and Jack Agazarian landed in France on a Lockheed Hudson airplane to investigate the fate of the Prosper network. SOE in London was aware that Suttill had been arrested but believed that his wireless operator Gilbert Norman was still at liberty. In reality, Norman was imprisoned and the Germans were using his radio to mislead the SOE.

30 July

In Paris, Bodington and Agazarian contacted Gilbert Norman to arrange a meeting. The Germans in control of Norman's radio told Bodington to meet Norman at an apartment near the Gare Saint-Lazare. However, instead of Bodington, Agazarian went to the apartment and was arrested by the Germans. Why Bodington did not go to the apartment rather than Agazarian has been disputed. Bodington's friend and double agent Henri Déricourt may have warned Bodington not to go to the rendezvous. Agazarian was later executed.

=== August 1943 ===
2 August

SOE agent and prominent Grand Prix motor racing driver William Grover-Williams was arrested by the Gestapo. He would later be executed.

16/17 August

Nicolas Bodington, Claude de Baissac, and Lise de Baissac returned to England via a Lysander that left England on the night of the 16th (landing in central France) and returned to England on the morning of the 17th.

=== September 1943 ===
15 September

Cecily Lefort was arrested by Gestapo in Montélimar, 26, Rhône-Alpes.

17/18 September

Yolande Beekman, Henri Derringer, Harry Despaigne and Harry Peulevé left England in a double Lysander mission and arrived in German-occupied France near Angers.

=== October 1943 ===
13 October

Noor Inayat Khan, the last remaining SOE wireless operator in the Paris area, was arrested. She apparently was betrayed by another woman to the Germans for money. The Germans also found her codes and security checks and used her wireless to mislead SOE, resulting in the arrest of more SOE agents and recovery of arms. Inayat Khan was imprisoned at 84 Avenue Foch, the SD (German counter-intelligence) headquarters in Paris.

30 October

Vera Leigh was arrested at a café near the Place des Ternes in Paris and taken to Fresnes prison in Val-de-Marne (near Paris).

=== November 1943 ===
18 November

Diana Rowden and John Young were arrested at Clairvaux-les-Lacs, 39 near Lons-le-Saunier.

19 November

Diana Rowden was taken to 84 Avenue Foch where she was interrogated for two weeks before being taken to Fresnes prison in Val-de-Marne near Paris.

25 November

Noor Inyat Khan, John Starr and Colonel Léon Faye escaped from 84 Avenue Foch but were quickly captured in the immediate vicinity.

26 November

Noor Inyat Khan and Leon Faye were sent to Germany after refusing to take an oath not to try to escape again. John Starr took the oath.

27 November

Michael Trotobas was killed in a gunfight with German soldiers in Lille.

== 1944 ==
=== January 1944 ===
3 January

In a jailbreak from Eysses prison, Philippe de Vomécourt and 52 other resistors escaped. Vomécourt made his way to Spain and to England and later in 1944 back to France where he led several sabotage operations.

13 January

Yolande Beekman and Gustave Bieler were arrested at the Café du Moulin Brulé in Saint-Quentin (Picardy).

=== February 1944 ===
28/29 February

SOE agents France Antelme, Madeleine Damerment, and Lionel Lee took off from RAF Tempsford airfield in a No. 161 Squadron Halifax aircraft late on 28 February and parachuted into a field near Chartres, Eure-et-Loir, early the next morning and were arrested by the Gestapo on their arrival. The Germans knew they were coming due to the wireless messages they had intercepted from the wireless machines they had captured during the destruction of the Prosper network. These three were among the 19 SOE agents captured on their arrival in France and executed. French helpers of the Prosper network who were deported to Germany totaled at least 167.

=== March 1944 ===
2-3 March
Eileen Nearne landed near Les Lagneys, Indre.

21 March
Harry Peulevé and Louis Bertheau were arrested in Brive-la-Gaillarde.

=== April 1944 ===
April

Maurice Southgate was arrested.

April 5

Lilian Rolfe was dropped near the city of Orléans, 45, to work with the "Historian" network run by George Wilkinson

April 29

John Hind Farmer and Nancy Wake of the "Freelance" network parachuted into Auvergne to liaise between London and the local Maquis.

=== May 1944 ===
May 13

Vera Leigh, Andrée Borrel, Odette Sansom, Diana Rowden, Yolande Beekman, Eliane Plewman and Madeleine Damerment were taken from Fresnes prison, 94, to 84 Avenue Foch, where they were joined by Sonya Olschanezky. They were all then moved to the civil prison at Karlsruhe in Germany.

=== June 1944 ===
June 6

The D-Day landings occurred in Normandy.

=== July 1944 ===
July

Eileen Nearne arrested.

July 2

Henri Frager was arrested by Abwehr sergeant Hugo Bleicher at a rendezvous arranged by Roger Bardet.

July 6

Diana Rowden, Vera Leigh, Sonya Olschanezky, and Andrée Borrel were shipped to the Natzweiler-Struthof, Bas-Rhin, concentration camp in the Vosges Mountains of Alsace (France) where they were injected with phenol and disposed of in the crematorium. Their arrival at the camp was witnessed by Brian Stonehouse.

Christine Granville arrived by parachute in France, joining the Jockey network led by Francis Cammaerts.

July 31

Lilian Rolfe was arrested in Nargis, 45 and taken to Fresnes prison, 94.

=== August 1944 ===
August

Lilian Rolfe was shipped to Ravensbrück concentration camp.
John Starr was sent to Sachsenhausen concentration camp.

8 August

Harry Peulevé, Maurice Southgate, Élisée Allard, Denis Barrett, Robert Benoist, Jean Bouguennec, Pierre Culioli, Angehand Defendini, Julien Detal, Henri Frager, Emile-Henri Garry, Frank Pickersgill, Pierre Geelen, Marcel Leccia, John Macalister, James Mayer, Pierre Mulsant, Charles Rechenmann, Roméo Sabourin, Arthur Steele and George Alfred "Teddy" Wilkinson were sent to Neue Bremm transit camp at Saarbrücken.

16 August

Harry Peulevé, Maurice Southgate, Eliseé Allard, Denis Barrett, Robert Benoist, Jean Bouguennec, Pierre Culioli, Angehand Defendini, Julien Detal, Henri Frager, Emile-Henri Garry, Frank Pickersgill, Pierre Geelen, Marcel Leccia, John Macalister, James Mayer, Pierre Mulsant, Charles Rechenmann, Roméo Sabourin, Arthur Steele and George Wilkinson arrived at Buchenwald concentration camp.

17 August

SOE Agent Christine Granville bribed the Gestapo for the release from prison of SOE Agents Francis Cammaerts and Xan Fielding who had been arrested earlier in August and were to be executed. Granville's feat was later portrayed fictionally in the television series Wish Me Luck.

25 August

General von Choltitz the German Military Commandant in Paris, formally signed an Act of Surrender to the Provisional Government of the French Republic, although some German strongholds remained in the city.

27 August

John Kenneth Macalister, Frank Pickersgill and Roméo Sabourin, were shipped to Buchenwald concentration camp.

=== September 1944 ===
6 September

Gilbert Norman was executed at Mauthausen concentration camp

13 September

Yolande Beekman, Madeleine Damerment, Noor Inayat Khan, and Eliane Plewman were executed, each by a single shot to the head, and their bodies cremated at Dachau concentration camp.

c.14 September

Sixteen SOE agents and associates of Robert Benoist were executed at Buchenwald concentration camp. SOE agents executed in addition to Benoist were Eliseé Allard, Angehand Defendini, Julien Detal, Emile-Henri Garry, Frank Pickersgill, Pierre Geelen, Marcel Leccia, Ken Macalister, James Mayer, Charles Rechenmann, Roméo Sabourin and Arthur Steele.

=== October 1944 ===
5 October

Denis Barrett, Henri Frager, Pierre Mulsant and George Alfred Wilkinson were executed at Buchenwald concentration camp.

== 1945 ==
=== February 1945 ===
c.February 5

Lilian Rolfe, Violette Szabo, and Denise Bloch were executed by being shot in the back of the neck at Ravensbrück concentration camp.

February 17

John Starr was sent to Mauthausen concentration camp.

=== March 1945 ===
29 March

Jack Agazarian was executed at Flossenbürg concentration camp. Just prior to his execution Agazarian tapped out in Morse code on the wall of his cell a message to his wife. The Danish prisoner who received the message later delivered it to SOE and Agazarian's wife.

=== April 1945 ===
April 11

Harry Peulevé escaped from Schönebeck concentration camp.

April 29

Brian Stonehouse was liberated from Dachau concentration camp by American troops.

=== May 1945 ===
May 4

Peter Churchill was liberated in Austria by American troops.

May 7

Nazi Germany surrendered to the Allies.

== 1946 ==
15 January

SOE was officially dissolved.
