= Germaine Tambour =

French Resistance fighter

Germaine Tambour (14 October 1903 – 2 March 1945) was a French resistance fighter during World War II.

== Biography ==
=== Family background ===
Germaine Louise Tambour was born on (October 14, 1903 in Paris 7th. She is the daughter of Alcide Tambour and Anne-Marie Tambour, born Aubin in 1873.

=== Civilian life ===
Before the war, she was secretary to André Girard.

=== Active resistance ===
Germaine Tambour successively belonged to several Resistance networks (code name “Annette”):

- Combat with Henri Frenay
- CARTE network, with André Girard, a painter and poster artist for whom she had been the secretary before the war
- DONKEYMAN network, attached network Special Operations Executive (SOE), and whose head was Henri Frager
- Prosper - PHYSICIAN network, of the Special Operations Executive (SOE), headed by Francis Suttill "Prosper".

Her apartment at 38 avenue de Suffren, Paris XVe, where she lived with her sister Madeleine, served as a mailbox and safe house for a large number of Special Operations Executive agents in late 1942 and early 1943, starting with Andrée Borrel and Francis Suttill upon their arrival in France.

=== In the hands of the Germans ===
Prefiguring the general collapse of the Prosper network at the beginning of the summer, she was arrested, along with her sister Madeleine, on April 22, 1944, then interned in Fresnes.

Worried, Francis Suttill and members of his management team (Armel Guerne, Jean Worms, Jacques Weil) set up an operation to try to get them to escape by bribing a French policeman. But the operation fails: instead of freeing the Tambour sisters, the policeman delivers them two prostitutes.

A new attempt is made by Suttill, on his return from England where he was recalled (from May 15 to 20). This time, instead of the sisters, it was the Abwehr agents in uniform who showed up where the handover was to take place. Francis Suttill and Gilbert Norman flee. It is a definite failure.

When the Prosper network collapsed in June–July 1943, Germaine Tambour was detained in Fresnes.

Testimony of Germaine Tambour collected in prison by Mrs. Flamencourt

Mrs. Flamencourt heard the testimony of Germaine Tambour in prison: "She told me how painfully surprised she had been during the interrogation to be put in the presence of Gilbert Norman, who seemed to enjoy a diet of favor, serving tea to the Germans and showing them, on a map spread out on the table, the airdrop sites and the arms depots.

During the interrogation, when Germaine tried to evade the questions, so as not to implicate people who were still free, Gilbert said: "But, Germaine, you don't say this, you don't say that, compromising at each times new groups". (File Pierre Culioli, call number 109.)

Germaine and her sister Madeleine were sent to Romainville, then to Compiègne.

They were finally deported together to the Ravensbrück camp where they arrived on April 1, 1944.

A year later, on March 2, 1945, for Germaine (Registration number 27551 KZ) then on March 4, 1945, for Madeleine (Registration number 27552 KZ), they were executed in the gas chamber.

== Acknowledgement ==
A plaque affixed to the facade of the building at 38, avenue de Suffren pays homage to her, as well as to her sister Madeleine and to Marie-Louise Monnet.

== Decoration ==
- Medal of the French Resistance posthumously (decree of March 11, 1947)

== Sources and external links ==
- Richard Seiler, La tragédie du réseau Prosper, avril-août 1943, Pygmalion, 2003.
- Henri Noguères, Histoire de la résistance en France de 1940 à 1945, Famot, 1982.
- Jean Lartéguy et Bob Maloubier, Triple jeu, l'espion Déricourt, Robert Laffont, 1992.
- Dimitri Vicheney, Une page de la Résistance dans le XVe arrondissement. Les réseaux du S.O.E. article in Bulletin de la société historique et archéologique du XVe arrondissement de Paris, numéro18, automne 2001, p. 5-17.
