= Frank Pickersgill =

Canadian spy (1915–1944)

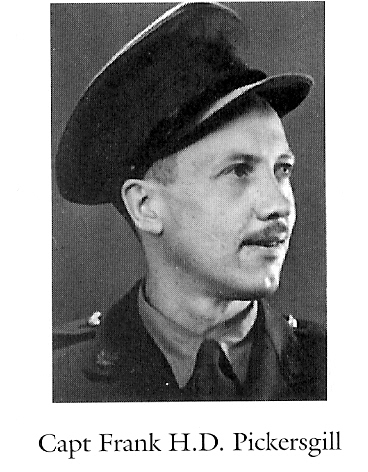

Frank Herbert Dedrick Pickersgill (May 28, 1915 – September 14, 1944), code named Bertrand, was a Canadian agent of the United Kingdom's clandestine Special Operations Executive (SOE) organization in World War II. The purpose of SOE in occupied France was to conduct espionage, sabotage and reconnaissance. SOE agents allied themselves with French Resistance groups and supplied them with weapons and equipment parachuted in from England. Pickersgill was captured by the Germans shortly after his arrival in France, imprisoned, and later executed.

== Early life ==
Born in Winnipeg, Manitoba, Pickersgill graduated from Kelvin High School in that city. Holding an English degree from the University of Manitoba and a Master's degree in classics from the University of Toronto, Pickersgill set out to cycle across Europe in 1934, then returned to Europe in 1938 to work as a freelance journalist for several Canadian newspapers. During his travels he met Jean-Paul Sartre, whose work he hoped to translate into English, though the oncoming war distracted him from the project.

Frank Pickersgill was the younger brother of Jack Pickersgill, a member of the House of Commons of Canada and a Cabinet minister.

== World War II ==
Pickersgill spent the first two years of World War II imprisoned by the Germans in Saint-Denis Internment Camp (Stalag 220) as an enemy alien. He escaped by sawing out a window with a hacksaw blade smuggled into the camp in a loaf of bread. Pickersgill made his way to the American Consulate in Lyon, France. The United States still had diplomatic relations with Vichy France, not yet occupied by Nazi Germany. On arrival in Lyon, American diplomat Constance Ray Harvey described him as lean, hungry, and with practically no clothes. He helped the Americans write a newsletter in French describing events in the war while he waited for them to arrange an exit permit from France for him. He made his way to neutral Lisbon where the U.S. Embassy had a fund to help escapees from Nazi-controlled Europe.

=== SOE agent ===
Once Pickersgill was safely back in Britain, he rejected the offer of a desk job in Ottawa and instead received a commission in the newly created Canadian Intelligence Corps. Because he was fluent in German, Latin, Greek and especially French, he became an agent of the British Special Operations Executive (SOE).

Together with fellow Canadian, Ken Macalister, Pickersgill was parachuted into occupied France during the night of June 15/16, 1943. Pickersgill was to be the organiser (leader) of a new SOE network called Archdeacon, to be located in northeastern France in the Ardennes. Three days prior to their scheduled arrival, French SOE agent Pierre Culioli had requested the operation be cancelled because of many German soldiers in the drop area. His SOE leader, Francis Suttill, declined the request and the two Canadians parachuted into France as planned.

Both men were met when they landed by Culioli and SOE agent Yvonne Rudellat (codename 'Jacqueline'). They stayed a few days with Rudellat and Culioli near Romorantin to get their French identity papers in order. On June 21, Culioli and Rudellat drove the Canadians toward Beaugency but they were stopped at a German checkpoint in Dhuizon. The four were ordered out of the car for questioning and for their papers to be examined. Rudellat and Culioli were cleared and returned to the car but the Germans were suspicious of the Canadians, possibly because their French was not of native speaker quality. While they were waiting for the Canadians to be released, a German soldier ordered Culioli and Rudellat to get out of the car for more questioning. Instead, Culioli sped away, chased and shot at by Germans in another car. Rudellat was seriously wounded and they were captured when they ran into another checkpoint about 10 kilometres away. Rudellat subsequently died in Bergen-Belsen; Culioli survived the war.

Pickersgill was imprisoned for several months in Fresnes Prison near Paris, then taken to a prison at Ravitsch (now Poland). In poor physical condition, he was returned to 84 Avenue Foch, the headquarters of the Sicherheitsdienst (SD), the German intelligence Service, in Paris. Josef Kieffer, the SD leader in Paris, wanted to use Pickersgill in the funkspiel (radio game) in which the Germans were using captured SOE radios to deceive SOE headquarters in London and capture agents and equipment on their arrival in France. Pickersgill, in May 1944, attempted to escape, attacking his guards with a broken bottle, killing one or two of them, and jumping out of a second story window, breaking an arm. A soldier fired at him. He was hit twice by bullets and recaptured.

On 8 August 1944, with the allied armies advancing on Paris Pickersgill and 36 other SOE agents, including three women, were loaded onto buses, given Red Cross parcels containing food, and taken to the railroad station where they boarded a train for Germany. The allied armies were approaching Paris and would capture the city on 25 August. During the trip, the train was attacked and disabled by allied fighter planes, although none of the prisoners were hurt. The prisoners were loaded onto trucks and continued their journey to Neue Bremm a concentration camp near the city of Saarbrücken. Some of the prisoners wanted to attempt an escape, but others disagreed and forced the abandonment of the escape plan. The prisoners opposing the escape attempt harbored the thought that they would be treated as prisoners-of-war rather than spies. After a few days of brutal treatment, all 34 of the male prisoners were loaded into trucks and taken to Buchenwald concentration camp. The three women were sent to Ravensbrück, a camp for women.

On 9 September at Buchenwald, the camp commandant received an order to give 16 of the prisoners "special treatment." At Buchenwald that meant execution by being choked to death while suspended above the floor on a meat hook. Pickersgill was among the 16 executed on or about 14 September 1944.

After the war, SOE's Vera Atkins interviewed Kieffer who named Pickersgill as one of three captured SOE agents who successfully resisted all German efforts to obtain information from them. The two other successful resistors he named were Noor Inayat Khan and France Antelme.

Posthumously, the government of France awarded Pickersgill the Legion of Honour, and he is listed as one of the SOE agents who died for the liberation of France on the "Roll of Honour" on the Valençay SOE Memorial in Valençay in the département of the Indre. He is commemorated by an obelisk at Romorantin-Lanthenay, where he is one of 4 members of SOE to be listed. He is also honoured on the Groesbeek Memorial in the Groesbeek Canadian War Cemetery in the Netherlands. The University of Toronto designated a Pickersgill-Macalister Garden on the west side of the "Soldiers' Tower" monument, but later the plot was rededicated "in memory of those tho gave their lives for peace and freedom", though there is still a plaque saying that it was originally dedicated to Macalister and Pickersgill.
