= Francis Suttill =

British espionage agent (1910–1945)

Francis Alfred Suttill DSO (born, France, 17 March 1910 – executed 23 March 1945), code name Prosper, was an agent of the United Kingdom's clandestine Special Operations Executive (SOE) organization in World War II. Suttill was the creator and organiser (leader) of the Physician or Prosper network (or circuit) based in Paris, France, from October 1942 until June 1943. The purpose of SOE in France was to recruit resistance groups and supply them with arms and material in order to carry out sabotage against Nazi Germany.

Under Suttill's leadership the Prosper network was SOE's most important network in France, notable for its rapid growth, wide circle of contacts and collaborators, and the geographical reach of its operations "from the Ardennes to the Atlantic." It has been suggested that the network was too large and diverse, and that security was lax.

In what has been called SOE's "catastrophe of 1943," Suttill was captured by the Germans on 24 June 1943 and later executed. By the end of August 1943, the Germans had captured many of the nearly 30 SOE agents associated with him and hundreds of local French people working with or cooperating with SOE. Many were killed, executed, or died in concentration camps.

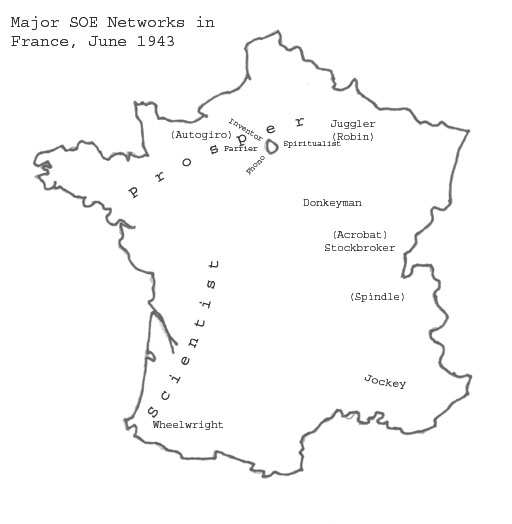
SOE networks (or circuits) in France, June 1943.

== Early years ==
Suttill was born in Mons-en-Barœul near Lille, France, to an English father, William Francis Suttill, and a French mother, Blanche Marie-Louise Degrave. His father managed a textile manufacturing plant in Lille. Suttill studied at Stonyhurst College, Lancashire, England until he was 16 when he contracted poliomyelitis. His doctors thought he would never walk again but he recovered with one leg shorter than the other. For the school year 1927/8, he attended the College de Marcq in Mons-en-Barœul, gaining his Baccalauréat. He then read law at the University of Lille and was accepted as an external student at University College London. In 1931, he moved to London to continue his studies and eventually became a barrister at Lincoln's Inn. He married Margaret Montrose in 1935 and had two sons.

== World War II ==
=== Prosper Network ===
Prosper was magnificent, strong, young, courageous and decisive, a kind of Ivanhoe; but he should have been a cavalry officer, not a spy.

— Henri Déricourt

In May 1940, Suttill was commissioned into the East Surrey Regiment of the British Army. He was recruited and trained by SOE during the summer of 1942. Charismatic and a natural leader, Suttill was considered by SOE to be "highly resourceful, and smarter than most" and thus chosen for its "most challenging job: to establish a circuit in Paris, covering a vast chunk of central France." His network was named Physician, although more commonly was called by his code name of Prosper.

Earlier SOE networks, Carte and Autogiro, led by Frenchmen André Girard and Pierre de Vomécourt respectively, had been destroyed by the Germans. With the allied invasion of North Africa approaching, and tentative plans for an invasion of France in 1943, Suttill's job was to build a network to replace them in northern France. SOE Section F (France) leader Maurice Buckmaster in London envisioned a strong resistance network based in Paris to harass the German occupiers of France.

On 24 September 1942, Suttill's courier, Andrée Borrel, code names Denise and Monique, parachuted into France to prepare for his arrival. He himself left England on the night of 1 October 1942 on a No. 138 Squadron RAF Halifax aircraft and parachuted into France near La Ferté-sous-Jouarre with a Deputy Lt. James Frederick Amps. Suttill was fluent in spoken French, but had an accent and he relied on Borrel, already experienced in the resistance, for much of his communication. After meeting in Paris, Suttill and Borrel took a month long trip around central France, exploring the potential for setting up resistance networks. They posed as an agricultural salesman and his assistant. Their early successes and high level of activity led SOE to send them two wireless operators, Gilbert Norman (Archambaud) in November, and Jack Agazarian (Marcel) in December. Most SOE networks had only one wireless operator.

During late 1942 and the first half of 1943, the Prosper network grew rapidly, covering a large part of northern France, and involving hundreds of locally recruited agents and some 60 sub-networks. SOE headquarters in London was both surprised and elated at the rapid progress of Prosper, although concerned about its connections with the communists who were especially powerful in the northern suburbs of Paris. SOE, Suttill, and the French Resistance groups had the expectation that an allied invasion of France would occur in fall 1943. The efforts of Prosper and its sub-networks were directed toward becoming a potent resistance force to aid the proposed invasion. Suttill stockpiled arms and ammunition parachuted in from England to that end.

=== Air operations ===
Parachute drops of weapons and supplies arranged by Suttill began in November 1942. Parachute reception teams and drop areas were in the Ardennes in Belgium, near Falaise in Normandy, three areas around Le Mans and two around Troyes, soon to be taken over by the Tinker network. Also, both the Privet network around Nantes and the Musician network around Saint-Quentin, Aisne were originally part of the Physician network. There were two main clusters: one in the Vernon/Beauvais/Meru triangle to the northwest of Paris and the other between Tours, Orléans and Vierzon, an area known as the Sologne between the rivers Loire and Cher.

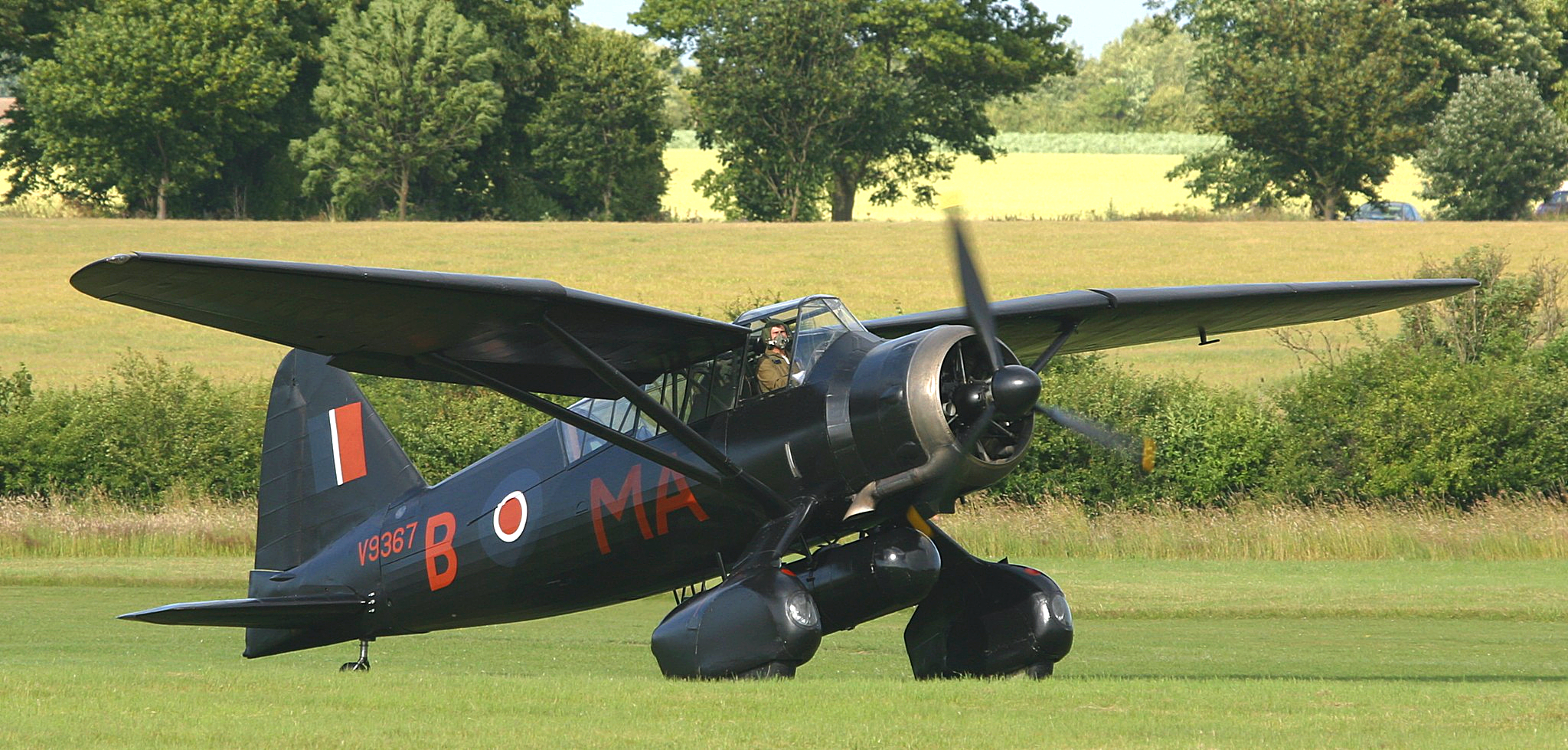
The Westland Lysander was one of the aircraft that ferried agents back and forth to England. An extra fuel tank beneath the fuselage allowed for those long range flights.

Whilst parachute drops were organised by circuit leaders, pick-up operations were organised by a specialist. On the night of 22/23 January 1943, a much-travelled French pilot named Henri Déricourt, code named Gilbert, was parachuted into France, landing about 80 kilometres (50 miles) south of Paris. As the air movements officer for SOE's French Section, Déricourt was charged with finding farm fields in northern France suitable for landing small aircraft from England and arranging for the embarkation or disembarkation of SOE agents. He also collected mail and reports, often written in plain text rather than coded, from the agents and delivered messages to them. He accomplished the dangerous tasks of arranging clandestine aircraft landings and the reception and departure of agents without many problems.

=== Security ===
In April 1943, Benjamin Cowburn, an experienced and careful agent, delivered radio crystals to Suttill in Paris. Cowburn described Suttill as having a "dynamic personality" and said that "the small world of the resistance rallied to a strong personality." He also saw problems with security and remarked that a large number of SOE agents and their French contacts were going in and out of the same apartment. Suttill responded that SOE headquarters kept sending people to him who needed help and that the address of the apartment had been passed around by agents. He had in fact cancelled this letter box in February and did so again during his visit to London in May 1943. The size and scope of Prosper violated SOE doctrine that agents in different networks should have no contact with each other and even that agents in the same network should rarely meet, but rather communicate through intermediaries or letter-drops. However, the shortage of wireless operators in France resulted in agents from several other circuits having to contact his operators to communicate with London. This made the circuit more vulnerable but despite the German Gestapo and Abwehr becoming more expert at rooting out SOE agents and their French collaborators, this was not the reason for the capture of Suttill and many of his agents and the destruction of the Prosper network.

=== German destruction of Prosper ===
The truth is that Prosper's downfall, tragic as its consequences were, was brought on in spite of their bravery by the agents' own incompetence and insecurity...The real wonder is not that Suttill and his friends were caught, but that it took so long for so many Germans to catch them.

— M. R. D. Foot

On 22 April 1943, the Tambour sisters, Germaine and Madeleine, long-time members of the French Resistance were arrested in Paris. Suttill, through an intermediary, attempted to buy their release with a one million franc bribe, but the Germans deceived him by releasing two prostitutes rather than the Tambour sisters. The danger of the arrest to Prosper was that ten of its agents had used the house as a letter-box and meeting place, far more than was prudent.

On 15 May 1943, Suttill returned to London for unknown reasons. He was parachuted back in France near Chaumont-sur-Tharonne on 21 May with another SOE agent, France Antelme. On his return, his confidence seemed shattered due to the ignorance of SOE personnel in London about the conditions he faced in the field. On 19 June, Suttill sent a bitter message to London blaming SOE for directing newly arrived wireless operator Noor Inayat Khan to a compromised letter-box. He cancelled all passwords and letter-boxes.

On the night of 15–16 June, two SOE agents, Canadians John Kenneth Macalister and Frank Pickersgill, were dropped to one of sub-network leader Pierre Culioli's reception sites. On the morning of 21 June, Culioli and his courier, Yvonne Rudellat, set off by automobile with the two Canadians to catch a train to Paris, unaware that the Germans had set up extensive roadblocks. They were caught, and the Germans found packages of letters and instructions and radio crystals in the car, two of which were clearly labelled "For Archambaud". This led the Germans to Archambaud (Gilbert Norman, Suttill's wireless operator) because, as Culioli admitted after the war, he had the address of Archambaud in his briefcase when he was caught. Shortly after midnight of 23 June, a German officer pretending to be one of the recently parachuted Canadian agents came to the apartment where Norman was staying, and he and Andrée Borrel were arrested. The apartment was full of identification cards and other documents. The Germans learned, probably from the documents, where Suttill was, and he was arrested mid-morning on 24 June at a cheap hotel where he was staying.

The arrests continued. On 1 July Jean Worms, head of the Juggler Network, and Armel Guerne, one of Suttill's locally recruited seconds-in-command, were arrested in a Paris cafe where Worms ate lunch every day. Over the next three months, hundreds of local agents associated with Prosper were arrested, of whom 167 are known to have been deported to Germany, where about one-half were executed, killed, or died in concentration camps. The communists in the Paris suburbs with whom Suttill worked mostly survived the debacle because of their rigid security practices and their dependence on SOE only for arms and money, not guidance and communications. The survivors of the Prosper Network were mostly in the sub-networks of Prosper in north-eastern France.

=== Norman's messages ===
On 25 June, an agent in Paris radioed SOE headquarters in London that Suttill, Norman, and Borrel "had disappeared, believed arrested." Soon after his arrest, Norman decided that it would be worth contacting London under German control so that he could warn them that he had been arrested by leaving out a security check. It seems that he may have sent three such messages in the five days following his arrest, two of which were repeats of messages he had already sent. In order to be allowed to send these, he had to reveal his codes. This enabled the Germans to decode his back messages which Norman did not realise had all been recorded during May and June but which had not been understood until he had revealed his codes. Reading these messages gave the Germans detailed locations, dates and quantities of material of almost every drop received over the last two months and it was this that persuaded Norman that he might as well cooperate in an attempt to save lives. London was surprised by the mistakes in Norman's messages as he had a high reputation for efficiency and accuracy and SOE's French section leader, Maurice Buckmaster, refused to believe that he had been captured. He sent back a message to Norman's radio saying, "You have forgotten your double security check. Be more careful next time." but this was after Norman had decided to cooperate.

Dr. Josef Goetz was the wireless expert at 84 Avenue Foch in Paris, the headquarters of the Sicherheitsdienst (SD), the security service of the German SS. When wireless operator Gilbert Norman was captured on 23 June, the Germans also captured his wireless set. When Goetz realised from Buckmaster's response that London thought that Norman was still free, they attempted to continue to send messages that London would believe were being sent to Norman. They succeeded at first and were able to trick wireless operator Jack Agazarian into a meeting in July where he was arrested but this resulted in their game being exposed and communication with Norman's radio ceased.

=== Cooperation with the Germans ===
Some authors report that after their arrest Suttill or Norman or both made a pact with SD head Josef Kieffer. The terms were that, if Suttill or Norman told the Germans where their caches of arms were located, they and the local people involved would not be tried by tribunal but simply sent to a concentration camp. Whether such a pact existed has been debated by historians. A SOE agent, Marcel Rousset (one of the few SOE agents captured by the Germans who survived), told SOE that he had met Norman at 84 Avenue Foch and Norman told him that both he and Suttill had made a pact with Kieffer to tell everything to save their lives. Norman advised Rousset to do the same. SOE's Vera Atkins interviewed Kieffer after the war while he was on trial for war crimes. Atkins' report did not confirm that such a pact existed. She was vague about this all-important question. Atkins reported only that Kieffer said that Suttill "did not want to make a statement" and not whether or not he did. She also reported that Kieffer said that Norman "had not the character of" Suttill, which gives the impression that Norman was the more malleable of the two. Author Helm speculated that Atkins manipulated and concealed information to coverup SOE's mistakes. At the time of this interview in 1947, accusations were being made by the French that Suttill had sold out his French followers. Atkins and SOE neither confirmed nor denied this accusation. Suttill's family was bitter at the lack of support they received from SOE.

There is however evidence that Suttill did not agree to cooperate with his captors. This is a deposition by Maurice Braun who was a member of Marcel Fox's Publican circuit. He records that in September 1943 he was for a short while placed in a cell in Fresnes with Fox, Jean Worms and two agents of Prosper whose names he did not know. Fox and Worms told him that it was Norman who had sold them out and that there was no point in hiding anything as Norman had told them everything. This was confirmed by the two Prosper agents who added that Norman had given the Prosper circuit and, ‘that he had assisted at the interrogation of Prosper which lasted without interruption for several days and several nights and that little by little Norman completed or made Prosper give up the details that the latter wished to hide’.

=== The role of Déricourt ===
The role of Henri Déricourt, the French Section's air movements officer in northern France, in the destruction of the Physician/Prosper network is much debated. Déricourt, as mentioned above, arranged for the arrival and departure of SOE agents by air and collected their mail, including their uncoded reports, for transmittal to London. He was highly successful in these duties, but doubts about him began to be expressed in June 1943, at about the same time that Germans had begun destroying the Prosper network. Several SOE agents communicated that "Gilbert is a traitor," but it is unclear whether they were talking about Déricourt, code named Gilbert, or Gilbert Norman who had been captured by the Germans. In October 1943, Henri Frager, a veteran resistance leader, flew to London specifically to denounce Déricourt as a traitor. Déricourt, however, enjoyed the support of SOE French section leader Buckmaster and his deputy, Nicolas Bodington.

What Déricourt appears to have done was to copy the letters and reports which agents gave him for transmittal by airplane to England and give them to the Germans. The Germans learned about part of the Prosper network, which facilitated the arrests of locally recruited agents and the destruction of their groups. Moreover, interrogators such as Kieffer were able to weaken the resolve of captured SOE agents by revealing how much the Germans knew about them personally.

== Conspiracy theories ==
An oft-cited theory is that Suttill and his Prosper colleagues were deliberately sacrificed by the British to mislead the Germans about allied plans for the invasion of Nazi-occupied Europe. The British reasoning behind the deception was that if the Germans anticipated an invasion of France in 1943, they would maintain or expand their occupation forces in western Europe, rather than sending resources east to combat the advancing Soviet Army. According to the theory, Suttill, during his mysterious visit to London in May 1943, was told or given the impression that the invasion of Europe would still take place in 1943. Thus, on Suttill's return to France the Prosper network accelerated its efforts to organize resistance to the German occupation. The British betrayed Suttill and his SOE associates, the theory goes, because, after being captured and tortured, the British anticipated that Suttill and other SOE agents would tell the Germans that a 1943 allied invasion of Europe was imminent. British Secret Intelligence Service (SIS) deputy leader Claude Dansey, who was known to oppose the existence of SOE, has been suggested as the perpetrator of the deception scheme and alleged betrayal.

The conspiracy theory was debunked by Foot and by Suttill's son, Francis J. Suttill. The SOE historian, M.R.D. Foot said, "if you can believe that, you can believe anything." He said the theory was implausible. Suttill concludes that "the arrest of my father was the consequence of a series of unfortunate events, not the result of any betrayal as part of a deception plan."

== Execution and honours ==
After his capture on 24 June 1943, Suttill was imprisoned and interrogated at Sicherheitsdienst (SD) headquarters at 84 Avenue Foch in Paris and later sent to Sachsenhausen concentration camp near Berlin where he was held in solitary confinement in the prison block until he was shot on 23 March 1945. He was awarded the Distinguished Service Order posthumously. Francis Suttill is honoured on the Commonwealth War Graves Commission Memorial at Groesbeek in the Netherlands and also on the Roll of Honour on the Valençay SOE Memorial in Valençay, in the Indre department of France. A biography of Suttill titled Shadows in the Fog: The true story of Major Suttill and the Prosper French Resistance Network by his son, Francis J. Suttill, was published by The History Press in 2014. A revised and updated edition was published by The History Press in 2018 titled Prosper: Major Suttill's French Resistance Network.

== See also ==
- Timeline of SOE's Prosper Network
