= Benjamin Cowburn =

British clandestine agent

Benjamin Cowburn MC*
- Born: Benjamin Hodkinson Cowburn; 13 March 1909; Lancashire, England
- Died: 17 December 1994 (aged 85); Boulogne-Billancourt, France
- Military career
- Allegiance: United Kingdom
- Branch: British Army; Special Operations Executive
- Service years: 1941–1944
- Rank: Major
- Service number: 183828
- Conflicts: World War II
- Awards: Military Cross and Bar; Croix de Guerre; Chevalier of the Legion of Honour

Benjamin Hodkinson Cowburn MC*, Croix de Guerre, Chevalier of the Legion of Honour (1909–1994), code named Benoit and Germain, was an agent of the United Kingdom's clandestine Special Operations Executive (SOE) organization during World War II. He was the creator and leader of the Tinker network (or circuit) which operated in the area of Troyes, France. The purpose of SOE was to conduct espionage, sabotage, and reconnaissance in countries occupied by the Axis powers, especially Nazi Germany. SOE agents allied themselves with resistance groups and supplied them with weapons and equipment parachuted in from England.

Cowburn was sent into occupied France on four different missions during World War II. He was the longest serving F-Section (French Section) SOE agent. He was never captured by the Germans. Of the more than 400 SOE agents who worked in France during World War II, M. R. D. Foot, the official historian of the SOE, named Cowburn as one of SOE's half-dozen "best men." Cowburn was a prudent and practical agent, much concerned with the security of the French people with whom he worked.

== Biography ==
Cowburn was born on 13 March 1909. He had arrived in Paris with his parents, aged eight, and studied at a British school in Boulogne-sur-Seine and then at a Lycée. He later studied electrical engineering and worked for the American firm, Foster Wheeler, building distillation plants for oil refineries all over France.

In the task of passing as a Frenchman, Cowburn had some difficulty. During his time in France, three different people asked him innocently if he were English as he spoke French with an accent. Cowburn was described by author Clare Mulley as short, stocky, and taciturn, "the very picture of a 'dour north-countryman.'" Moreover, he was blunt spoken with a "directness of manner" that was "disconcerting." He was known for his fondness of telling off-color ("blue") stories which made him popular in the officer's mess while in England. In early 1944, in Algiers, he was in charge of training SOE agent Christine Granville to be deployed in France but the charismatic "diva" and Cowburn, the "great performer," did not get along. M.R.D. Foot later said that Cowbourn's outspokenness probably prevented him from getting the honors that many of his peers in the SOE received, although some of them were "not half his worth."

== Special Operations Executive ==
Recruited in 1941 into SOE's 'F' (French) Section, Cowburn was trained at Wanborough Manor in the spring of 1941.

=== First mission ===
Cowburn, code named Benoit, first parachuted into Vichy France near Châteauroux from a Whitley bomber on the night of 6/7 September 1941. He was part of a group of six agents who were met by wireless operator Georges Bégué (the first SOE agent in France) and French Resistance member Max Hymans. Cowburn first journeyed to Paris, crossing clandestinely on foot from Vichy France into occupied France and due to the danger involved in the crossing he resolved to find a better way in the future. On his next and subsequent border crossings he conspired with cooperative railway workers to cross the border by lying in a space beneath the tender of a locomotive where he was invisible to routine inspections of the train.

Cowburn's first task was to set up a resistance network ("reseau") in the Paris area and to look for targets for sabotage. He worked with Pierre de Vomécourt, an aristocratic resistance leader. He got tangled up in the delicate dance between Vomécourt and double (and triple) agent Mathilde Carré ("The Cat") and attempted to return with them to Britain by boat. Failing in that but feeling the necessity of returning to inform SOE headquarters in London of the treachery of Carré, he undertook a long difficult journey, crossing the Pyrenees on foot into Spain and arriving in Britain in March 1942. De Vomécourt's brother Philippe de Vomécourt in Limoges and the American Virginia Hall in Lyon helped him during his flight from France.

Cowburn's perceptiveness and caution is illustrated by his comment about German spycatcher Sergeant Hugo Bleicher who posed as a German colonel during the Carré affair. Cowburn doubted that Bleicher was a colonel because "he wore such cheap shoes."

While in Paris, Cowburn learned that German soldiers paraded down the Champs-Élysées every day shortly after noon. That information permitted the RAF to mount a propaganda mission. On 12 June 1942, a Bristol Beaufighter piloted by Ken Gatward dropped a French flag on the Arc de Triomphe, flew down the length of the Champ-Èlysées at an altitude of 12 metres (39 ft), fired cannons at the German High Command headquarters, and returned to England safely.

=== Second mission ===
Cowburn's second mission was more ambitious, albeit still more exploratory than operational, than his first. He arrived 1/2 June 1942 by parachute with an assistant, American-born Edward Wilkinson ("Alexandre"), plus luggage on an additional parachute. They were dropped in Vichy France (still unoccupied by the Germans) 65 kilometres (40 miles) distant from their intended spot but met each other by pre-arrangement in Tarbes. They traveled first to Lyon to meet with Virginia Hall, an SOE agent, and find a wireless operator, Denis Rake, and then onward to Paris in occupied France, crossing the border using Cowburn's under-the-tender technique. Rake and Wilkinson, however, were captured by the Germans on 15 August and Cowburn was left to fend by himself, maintaining contact with SOE headquarters in London through Hall. He received two air drops of sabotage supplies and persuaded French friends in Chateauroux to introduce abrasives into the production line for manufacturing aircraft engines and to destroy high-tension electrical lines at the Eguzon power station, interrupting power transmission for a few hours. He returned to London along with Georges Duboudin ("Jean") from a clandestine airfield by Westland Lysander on 26 October 1942.

=== Third mission ===
Cowburn adopted the code name Germain for his third mission. He parachuted near Blois on 11/12 April 1943 along with a wireless operator, Denis John Barrett (Honore). The two were met on the ground by Pierre Culioli of the large, important, and ill-fated Prosper Network. Cowburn was a believer that SOE networks should avoid contact with each other for reasons of security as many SOE agents were being captured by the Germans. However, he was asked to deliver wireless crystals to Francis Suttill, the leader of Prosper in Paris. Cowburn delivered the crystals, but expressed concern to Suttill about the number of people involved with Prosper. He continued on to Troyes where he set up his own autonomous network called Tinker.

In addition to Barrett, Cowburn's key recruits in Troyes were Pierre Mulsant, who became his deputy, and Yvonne Fontaine, his courier. He took as much of the risk of capture as possible on himself, securing a house by himself and storing weapons and preparing plastic explosives for use. On the night of 3/4 July he and three men he had recruited slipped into the railway roundhouse and destroyed with explosives six locomotives and damaged another six. In a bit of irony, the Germans, now conscious of the need of security for the railway, bought lumber to erect barriers from Pierre Mulsant, who owned a lumber company.

In the crackdown following the destruction of the locomotives, the Germans learned from an informer of Cowburn's arms depot. He quickly removed all the arms and explosives to another location. As the situation in Troyes was becoming untenable, Cowburn returned to England by Lysander on 17 September 1943. Mulsant, Barrett, and Fontaine, for their own safety, followed in November.

=== Fourth mission ===
Disaster struck in July 1944. Pierre Mulsant and John Barrett of Cowburn's Tinker network had returned to France. They rushed to rescue a British commando team of the SAS which radioed that were in trouble in the Forest of Fontainebleau. The SAS team escaped, but Mulsant and Barrett were captured by the Germans. Benjamin Cowburn parachuted into France on 30 July in a vain attempt to free Mulsant and Barrett but both were later executed. Cowburn and Yvonne Fontaine, the fourth member of the Tinker team, continued work with the Resistance until the liberation of the area from German control in late August 1944 and then returned to England. On her return to England, Fontaine was outspoken in blaming SOE for the capture of Mulsant and Barrett.

== After the war ==
After World War II, Cowburn married a French woman who had been the secretary of Prime Minister Georges Bidault. In 1958, Cowburn's book, No Cloak, No Dagger, describing his experiences, was first published. Author Sebastian Faulks said he didn't know of a better SOE memoir. Foot said the book stands "the test of verification by official sources particularly well."

== Decorations ==
- Military Cross and Bar
- Croix de Guerre (French)
- Legion of Honour

== Books ==
- No Cloak, No Dagger: Allied Spycraft in Occupied France (1958)
