= Ken Macalister =

Canadian spy

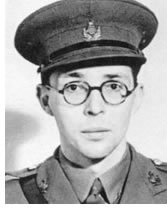
Captain John K. Macalister

John Kenneth Macalister (July 19, 1914 – September 14, 1944) was a Rhodes Scholar and a Canadian agent of the United Kingdom's clandestine Special Operations Executive (SOE) organization in World War II. The purpose of SOE in occupied France was to conduct espionage, sabotage and reconnaissance. SOE agents allied themselves with French Resistance groups and supplied them with weapons and equipment parachuted in from England. Macalister was captured by the Germans shortly after his arrival in France. The Germans also captured his wireless and used it to deceive SOE headquarters in London and to capture agents and military equipment. Macalister was imprisoned and later executed.

== Biography ==
Born in Guelph, Ontario, Canada, Ken Macalister graduated from the Guelph Collegiate Vocational Institute (GCVI) and from the University of Toronto, where he studied law and won first-class honours in every subject in every year. From Toronto, he was elected as one of Ontario's two Rhodes scholars in 1937, and studied at the New College, Oxford until 1939, graduating with one of the six first-class honours degrees awarded in a cohort of 200.

He was expanding his education further at the Institute of Corporate Law in Paris, France when World War II began in 1939. When he took the bar exam, Macalister placed first among over 150 candidates in the British Empire. Macalister tried to join the infantry but his eyesight was such that he needed thick glasses and as such could not be placed on active duty. However, fluent in French, Macalister volunteered for the Special Operations Executive (SOE) F Section where as an agent in France, his thick glasses would actually add to his disguise.

Together with fellow Canadian, Frank Pickersgill, Ken Macalister was parachuted into occupied France during the night of June 15/16, 1943, to work as the wireless operator for the "Archdeacon" network in the Ardennes area. Three days prior to their scheduled arrival, French SOE agent Pierre Culioli had requested the operation be cancelled because of many German soldiers in the area. His SOE leader, Francis Suttill, declined the request and the two Canadians parachuted into France as planned.

Both men were picked up by Culioli and the agent Yvonne Rudellat (codename 'Jacqueline'). They stayed a few days with Rudellat and Culioli near Romorantin to get their French identity papers in order. On June 21, Culioli and Rudellat drove the Canadians toward Beaugency but they were stopped at a German checkpoint in Dhuizon. The four were ordered out of the car for their papers to be examined. Rudellat and Culioli were cleared and returned to the car, but the Germans were suspicious of the two Canadians. While they were waiting for the Canadians to be released, a German soldier ordered Culioli and Rudellat to get out of the car for more questioning. Culioli sped away, chased and shot at by Germans in another car. Rudellat was seriously wounded and they were captured when they ran into another checkpoint about 10 kilometres away. Rudellat subsequently died in Bergen-Belsen; Culioli survived the war.

The Germans took Macalister and Pickersgill captive and also captured Macalister's wireless and coding information. In a process the Germans called funkspiel, they impersonated Macalister in wireless communications and misinformed London by claiming that the two Canadians had cultivated the incipient local resistance to German occupation in northwestern France and created a resistance network called Archdeacon. German agents posed as the two SOE agents and infiltrated the resistance movement. They confiscated fifteen large drops by parachute of arms and supplies. Six SOE agents were air-dropped to assist Archdeacon and were immediately captured and imprisoned by the Germans.

On 8 August 1944, with the allied armies advancing on Paris, Macalister and 36 other SOE agents, including three women, were loaded onto buses, given Red Cross parcels containing food, and taken to the railroad station where they boarded a train for Germany. The allied armies were approaching Paris and would capture the city on 25 August. During the trip, the train was attacked and disabled by allied fighter planes, although none of the prisoners were hurt. The prisoners were loaded onto trucks and continued their journey to Neue Bremm a concentration camp near the city of Saarbrücken. Some of the prisoners wanted to attempt an escape, but others disagreed and forced the abandonment of the escape plan. The prisoners opposing the escape attempt harbored the thought that they would be treated as prisoners-of-war rather than spies. After a few days of brutal treatment, all 34 of the male prisoners were loaded into trucks and taken to Buchenwald concentration camp. The three women were sent to Ravensbrück, a camp for women.

On 9 September at Buchenwald, the camp commandant received an order to give 16 of the prisoners "special treatment." At Buchenwald that meant execution by being choked to death while suspended above the floor on a meat hook. Macalister was among the 16 executed on or about 14 September 1944.

Captain Ken Macalister is honoured on the Brookwood Memorial, Surrey in Brookwood, Surrey, England and as one of the SOE agents who died for the liberation of France, he is listed on the "Roll of Honour" on the Valençay SOE Memorial in the town of Valençay, in the Indre département of France. He is commemorated by an obelisk at Romorantin-Lanthenay, where he is one of 4 members of SOE to be listed. In Guelph, there’s a park named after him with a maple tree representing his time in Canada, an oak his British sojourn, and a linden his time in France. The University of Toronto has designated a Pickersgill-Macalister garden on the west side of the "Soldiers' Tower" monument.
