= Yvonne Rudellat =

British secret agent

- Born: Yvonne Claire Cerneau; 11 January 1897; France
- Died: 23 or 24 April 1945; Bergen-Belsen concentration camp, Germany
- Spouse: Alex Rudellat
- Military career
- Allegiance: France; United Kingdom
- Branch: Special Operations Executive, FANY
- Service years: 1942–1945
- Rank: Ensign
- Nickname: Jacqueline
- Unit: Physician/Prosper

Yvonne Claire Rudellat, MBE, (née Cerneau; 11 January 1897 – 23 or 24 April 1945), code name Jacqueline, was an agent of the United Kingdom's clandestine Special Operations Executive (SOE) organization in World War II. The purpose of SOE in occupied France was to conduct espionage, sabotage and reconnaissance. SOE agents allied themselves with French Resistance groups and supplied them with weapons and equipment parachuted in from England.

Rudellat was the first female SOE-trained agent to go to France (although preceded by Virginia Hall who as an American entered Vichy France legally as a journalist). She worked as a courier for the Prosper or Physician network (or circuit) from August 1942 until June 1943, when she was captured by the Germans and imprisoned. She died of typhus in Bergen-Belsen concentration camp a few days after the liberation of the camp by the allies.

The official historian of the SOE, M.R.D. Foot, described Rudellat as "cheerful" and "fluffy" and with "steady nerves and good sense." As a courier she traveled widely around the Loire river valley to deliver messages and to participate in sabotage operations against facilities important to the Germans. She was "fast becoming a demolition expert" at the time of her capture.

== Early life ==
Yvonne Rudellat was born Yvonne Claire Cerneau on 11 January 1897 at Maisons-Lafitte, near Paris, France. She was the second youngest of ten children. Her eight older siblings had died in infancy; her younger brother Jean lived to age 18. Her father was a horse-dealer for the French Army and, when her domineering mother would allow it, Yvonne accompanied him on buying trips. After his death, Yvonne found it difficult to live with her mother, so she moved to London and got a job as a saleswoman at Galeries Lafayette then in Regent Street. However, her mother followed her and they lived together in Pimlico.

At least partly to get away from her mother, Yvonne married 32-year-old Alex Rudellat on 16 October 1920. Alex was an Italian national, an ex-cavalryman and undercover agent in the Italian army, but now a head waiter at the Piccadilly Hotel, also in Regent Street. Unfortunately for Yvonne, Alex, following Italian tradition, invited his widowed mother-in-law to stay with them, which she did for a number of years before returning to France. The Rudellats had one child, Constance Jacqueline, who was born in 1922. They stayed at a number of addresses around Pimlico in houses bought by Alex as an investment; they let rooms not used by themselves. Latterly they occupied the basement at 146 Warwick Way, letting the rest of the rooms. During this period a young Joan Littlewood let one of the rooms, while studying at RADA.

In 1935 Yvonne and Alex separated after Yvonne had an affair but Alex refused to divorce her and they continued jointly to bring up their daughter. Yvonne moved out and went into property management in her own right, but in 1938 she got into financial difficulties, sold out and moved back in with Alex, but in separate rooms, in the basement of 146 Warwick Way. With the outbreak of war, her daughter Constance joined the Auxiliary Territorial Service (ATS), met a sergeant in the Royal Army Pay Corps, Ronald Pepper, and married him on 12 December 1939. Ronald, too, moved into 146 Warwick Way. Constance had a child which made Rudellat a 45-year old grandmother. She was described at this time as "attractive, physically tough, with greying touseled hair."

== Involvement with SOE ==
Yvonne became quite depressed about the capitulation of France. She used to frequent a pâtisserie run by a long-term friend who was an ardent Gaullist in Baker Street. The pâtisserie was also frequented by personnel from nearby SOE headquarters and Yvonne developed the ambition that she should parachute into France to "do something for France". She would tell this to anyone she met.

On the night of 16–17 April 1941, near the end of The Blitz, 146 Warwick Way was damaged beyond repair by bombing. The Rudellats lost everything except a cache of money Alex had buried in the basement. Soon after, Yvonne's latest love affair came to an end. She felt that she had nothing left to live for and decided to take her own life by jumping into the River Thames. At the last minute she changed her mind and decided to make something of her life. She enrolled at a Pitman's training school to improve her typing skills and through the school soon got a job as a secretary at Ebury Court, a small hotel and drinking club in Ebury Street.

By chance, Ebury Court was also frequented by SOE personnel. She (and her ambition) came to the notice of Captain Selwyn Jepson, recruitment officer for the French (F) Section of SOE. Jepson interviewed her and as a result she left Ebury Court and was sent to Wanborough Manor, near Guildford, for preliminary training, vetting and selection. She passed this and was accepted into SOE on 15 May 1942.

She was then sent to Garramor, an SOE training establishment in a large house a little south of Morar in the West Highlands. In charge of instruction was Gavin Maxwell. There she trained on assault courses and learned the military aspects of being an agent such as the use of small arms and explosives. In order to gain protection under the Geneva Convention it was advisable for her to be a member of a uniformed organisation, so on 1 June 1942 she was commissioned as an ensign in the First Aid Nursing Yeomanry (FANY). However, given that the FANY was a civilian, not military, organisation there is doubt that this ruse could be relied upon.

She then went to Boarmans, one of ten houses on the Beaulieu Estate in Hampshire that had been taken over by SOE. There she learnt how to live clandestinely in enemy territory and the skills required in her role as a courier, such as the use of ciphers, radio, and boîtes aux lettres for leaving messages securely. She also learnt how to resist interrogation.

She passed out on 21 June 1942; confusingly her report is in the name of Mademoiselle [sic] Rudellat. There was however disappointment for her: she was too old to learn to parachute, so that aspect of her ambition was not to be fulfilled. She instead arrived in France by boat on the night of 30 July 1942.

== Wartime work ==
In France, Yvonne was to work in the Resistance under organiser Francis Suttill (code name Prosper) in his Physician network, although this was commonly called Prosper after its leader; many sources therefore refer to it as Physician/Prosper. Yvonne's cover name was Jacqueline Gautier: Jacqueline after her daughter, Gautier because it was a common French surname and would attract little attention. Her field name, used in wireless messages, was Suzanne. From then on, although she was to change her surname a number of times, she was always known as Jacqueline. Her cover story was that she was from Brest but had been bombed out. Following SOE practice, this was based as far as possible on the truth as she was able to use her experience at Warwick Way to provide realistic details.

Operation Sassafras saw Jacqueline leave by air for Gibraltar on 18 July 1942, accompanied by three male agents. Her cover name for the journey was Soaptree, so she was temporarily known as Jacqueline Viallet, viallet being the French for soaptree. They were surprised by German seaplanes off Ushant and their Whitley aircraft suffered some damage but the pilot managed to out-fly the Germans. On 20 July they boarded Seadog, a felucca, which took them from Gibraltar to a rocky stretch of coast in the Golfe-Juan, a few kilometres east of Cannes. They arrived on 30 July 1942, to be met by L'Équipe Renaudie, a Resistance offshoot of the CARTE network named after its leader Roger Renaudie, and known to SOE as 'Capitaine Yvon'. This made Jacqueline the first female SOE-trained agent to go to France.

Jacqueline was taken to Cannes station where she boarded a train for Lyon. There she took a train to Paris. This involved crossing the Demarcation Line between occupied and Vichy France; because of an alert over escaped prisoners she had to be smuggled across hidden in the tender of the locomotive. From Paris she went on to Tours where, she joined the Monkeypuzzle circuit, run by Raymond Flower. She was involved in the management of drop zones for agents and supplies and in the distribution of the latter around the area, using a bicycle.

Through Monkeypuzzle Jacqueline met Pierre Culioli. Because of animosity between Flower and the two of them they started working together to the exclusion of Flower and when Monkeypuzzle faded in the spring of 1943 they formed a circuit of their own, Réseau Adolphe (officially Réseau Sud-Touraine, a minor offshoot of Prosper circuit), with Suttill's blessing. Both adopted the surname Leclaire as a married couple was less conspicuous. They continued to organise parachute drops and to store and distribute arms and other supplies, pending the Allied invasion of France, which they expected in 1943. They established and trained other sub-circuits, the largest (with 80 members) being at Romorantin, now Romorantin-Lanthenay, in the Loire Valley. They also took part in minor acts of sabotage, mainly of trains and electric power lines.

On 19 June 1943 Jacqueline and Pierre, now using Pierre's surname, Culioli, picked up two Canadian agents, John Kenneth Macalister and Frank Pickersgill who had parachuted in a few days earlier. They were to take the Canadians by car to Beaugency station and from there accompany them to Paris where they would meet Suttill. With them in the car they had a parcel containing incriminating material: wireless telegraphy equipment brought by the Canadians and unencrypted messages addressed to members of the Prosper circuit by their code names. The parcel was disguised as a Red Cross parcel addressed to a fictitious prisoner of war.

They were stopped at a road block in Dhuizon. The Germans ordered the two Canadians out of the back of the car; two Germans got in and ordered Pierre to drive to the mairie. There Jacqueline and Pierre passed inspection of their papers; the parcel was queried but not inspected. They were given a laissez passer. They waited in the car outside in case the Canadians also got free. There were shouts for them to come back, so they shot off, Germans following in three cars. They came to a barricade near Braciuex (10 kilometres from Dhuizon) and drove straight at it. The Germans manning the block opened fire as they approached, shattering the windscreen. Jacqueline, who was looking out of the rear window for following Germans, was hit in the back of the head. Assuming Jacqueline was dead, Pierre, not having his suicide capsule, tried to kill himself by steering the car into a wall but it bounced off harmlessly. Pierre was uninjured but was subsequently shot in the leg by a German while trying to get killed resisting arrest.

== Imprisonment and death ==
Jacqueline was seriously injured. She was taken to Blois hospital. There the surgeon, Dr Luzuy, diagnosed that the bullet had stopped short of fatally entering her brain but she could expect some loss of brain functionality. He decided to leave the bullet in her head. Plans to rescue her from the hospital came to nought as she was moved from Blois to Hôpital de la Pitié in Paris. The Germans attempted to interrogate her but learnt nothing because of her confusion, real or exaggerated. In late September she was transferred to Fresnes prison, though still gravely ill. There she was classified as NN (Nacht und Nebel), meaning that she was liable for deportation to Germany and then to vanish without trace. Meanwhile, the Germans gave up on interrogation and her health slowly improved.

About the end of July 1944, Jacqueline was transferred to Fort de Romainville prison. There, confused as to what her surname was, she acted on the suggestion of another prisoner to adopt the common surname Gautier. By coincidence this was the name she had had on entering France, although it is unclear whether she remembered this.

Later that summer Jacqueline was transferred to the Ravensbrück concentration camp for women. There she wore a red triangle on her left sleeve, denoting that she was a political prisoner. She was recognised at Ravensbrück by a group of women from the Physician/Prosper circuit whom she had worked with in France. They tried to make contact and offered help but she appeared not to know them saying she had a different name.

In early 1945, probably through her confusion, Jacqueline got mixed up with a group being collected for transportation elsewhere and on 2 March 1945 she arrived at Bergen-Belsen concentration camp in the middle of a typhus epidemic which killed around 20,000 prisoners in that month alone. The camp was liberated by the Allies on 15 April 1945 but nearly 14,000 more died thereafter. Jacqueline contracted typhus and dysentery and became very weak. On 23 April, she was due to be moved to a hospital set up adjacent to the camp. She died shortly after arrival there on 23 or 24 April. She was buried in a mass grave with 5000 others.

It was impossible to keep records of all the dead, so Jacqueline's fate was not discovered until July 1946 when Vera Atkins, who was trying to find out what happened to missing SOE agents, traced her through a fellow Bergen-Belsen prisoner, who remembered her as Jacqueline Gautier.

== Honours and commemorations ==
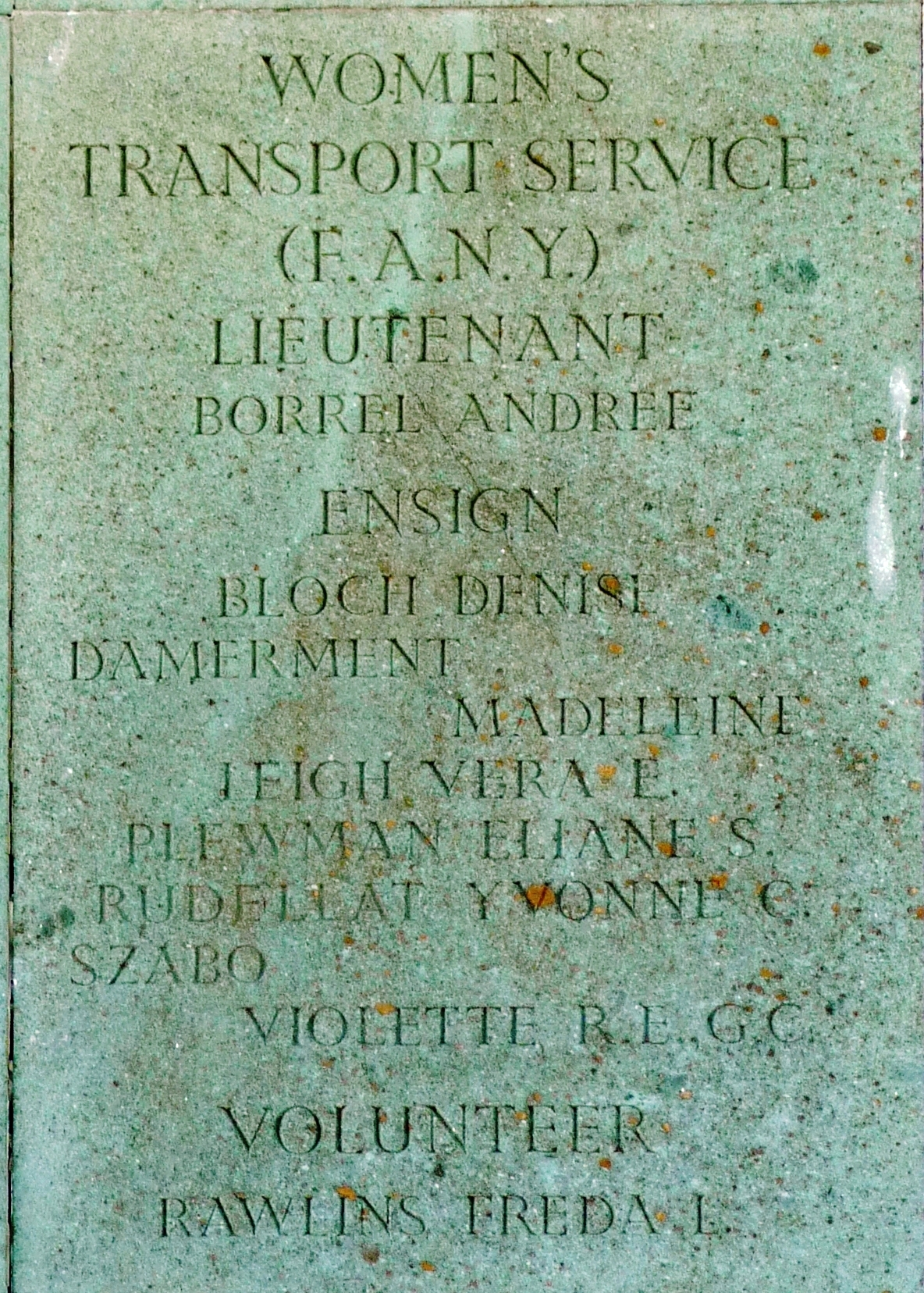
FANY (SOE) memorial, Brookwood Military Cemetery, 5 July 2017

Yvonne Rudellat was recommended for the Military Cross, probably at the instigation of Suttill when he visited London in April 1943. She is the only female officially recorded as having merited it during World War II, but she was ineligible as at that time it was not awarded to women. A citation in French dated 15 March 1945 recommended her for an OBE or George Medal "when she is liberated". She was later made an MBE, honorary because she was not a British citizen. Because the award is not given posthumously, it was backdated to 23 April 1945, the last day she was known to be alive.

Yvonne Rudellat is commemorated by an obelisk at Romorantin-Lanthenay, where she is one of four members of SOE to be listed. She is also commemorated on a plaque at the Valençay SOE Memorial, along with 91 men and 13 female SOE agents who were killed or died while working for SOE in France. In the UK she is commemorated on a marble plaque on the wall of St Paul's Church, Knightsbridge, London, one of 52 members of FANY who gave their lives in the war. She is also commemorated in column 3 of panel 26 of the Brookwood Memorial as one of 3,500 "to whom war denied a known and honoured grave".

== Confusion over spelling of surname ==
Yvonne's married surname was Rudellat, but her death certificate is in the name of Ruddelat. The Ruddelat spelling was followed on the war memorial in Romorantin, and also on the Brookwood Memorial until her daughter got it changed. The citation for her MBE refers to her as Mademoiselle (sic) Ruddelat. Other misspellings have also arisen, e.g. Rudelatt, Rudelat etc.

Her alias, Gautier, adopted when she first went to France and readopted after her capture by the Germans, is sometimes spelt Gauthier.

== Sources ==
King, Stella, 'Jacqueline', Pioneer Heroine of the Resistance, Arms and Armour Press, 1989.

Helm, Sarah, If This is a Woman, Inside Ravensbrück: Hitler's Concentration Camp for Women, Little, Brown, 2015

Helm, Sarah, A Life in Secrets: The Story of Vera Atkins and the Lost Agents of SOE, Little, Brown, 2005

Binney, Maurice, The Women Who Lived for Danger, The Women Agents of SOE in the Second World War, Hodder and Stoughton, 2002
