= James Mayer (spy) =

James Mayer (1920–1944) was a Mauritian secret agent during World War II.

== See also ==
- SOE F Section timeline
