= Funkspiel =

Radio-based counterintelligence operations in World War II

Funkspiel (German: radio game) was a German term most used referring to counter-intelligence operations in France against the Special Operations Executive during World War II. SOE was a British organisation formed in 1940 to conduct espionage, sabotage and reconnaissance in Axis occupied countries and to aid local resistance movements.

The Germans used captured wireless operators and their wirelesses (radios) to send false information to SOE headquarters in London and to intercept and act on SOE messages to agents in the field. A similar operation in the Netherlands was called Englandspiel (England game). The results of the two operations were that dozens of SOE agents were captured and executed, networks were destroyed, and the Germans confiscated tons of weapons and military equipment.

In both cases, SOE headquarters was slow to react to signs that its communications had been compromised. Funkspiel and Englandspiel are regarded as the worst disasters that SOE suffered during World War II.

== Background ==
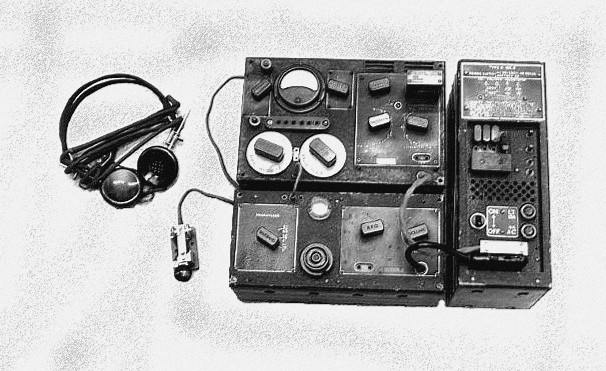
The B2 radio weighed a cumbersome 15 kg (33 lb) and required a long exterior aerial to transmit. A radio operator had the most dangerous of SOE jobs in France.

During World War II in Nazi-occupied Europe, the Abwehr and the Sicherheitsdienst (SD), German intelligence agencies, countered the attempts of agents of the British Special Operations Executive (SOE) to organize and arm resistance to the German occupation. The capture of wireless operators and their wireless sets (radios) was a high priority of the Germans as the captured radios could be used to gather information on SOE operations, capture agents and military equipment, and communicate misinformation to SOE headquarters in London.

Two success stories of German counter-intelligence were the Englandspiel in the Netherlands and the Funkspiel in France. They resulted in the capture and execution of dozens of SOE agents and the disruption of attempts by SOE to organize and lead resistance movements.

== France ==
=== Capturing radios ===
Funkspiel began in April 1943 when the SD captured SOE agent Marcus Bloom and his radio. The SD wireless expert, Josef Goetz, sent messages to London posing as Bloom but SOE headquarters perceived that the messages were bogus. In June 1943 the Germans captured newly-arrived SOE agent Ken Macalister, his radio, and the codes he would be using for transmittal or receipt of messages to and from SOE headquarters. Goetz at the time was on leave when the radio was captured, but he was called back to duty at SD headquarters in Paris to exploit the radio. On 20 July Goetz sent his first message to London posing as Macalister.

The SD gained another SOE radio when it captured Gilbert Norman and his radio on 23 June. Norman worked for the Prosper network, SOE's most important network in France. In late June the Germans began arresting the many SOE agents and French associates working for Prosper. The objective of funkspiel was to ensure that SOE in London believed that Prosper was still in operation and continue to send agents, money, and military equipment to France into the arms of the awaiting Germans.

SOE headquarters disregarded signs that Prosper and its agents were in serious difficulty. Three days after Norman's capture, an agent in France notified SOE that Norman and other Prosper personnel were missing. On 29 June SOE received a wireless message, ostensibly from Norman, but it was missing the secret "true check" that an agent was supposed to insert into every message. If the true check was missing, it meant that the agent was either not the transmitter of the message or was transmitting the message under duress. Instead of believing what the missing check signified, SOE instead responded by chastising Norman for forgetting to insert the true check and telling him to do better next time. The SD quickly pressured Norman into revealing his "true check." Funkspiel was underway.

The last remaining SOE wireless operator in Paris was Noor Inayat Khan. She was betrayed and captured on 13 October along with her radio. The SD now had three SOE radios and controlled the communications of Prosper's agents in northern France with SOE headquarters. The SD acquired additional SOE radios and wireless operators as it destroyed Prosper outside Paris.

=== Playing the game ===
The Germans capture of the three SOE radios and their operators gave the Germans the capability to deceive SOE headquarters and to anticipate SOE operations inserting agents and military equipment into the country. The Germans captured agents and confiscate arms and military equipment parachuted into France, and broke up networks of French people resisting the German occupation of their country. Macalister's radio, for example, was used to misinform London by claiming that its agents had created an active resistance network called Archdeacon in northwestern France. German agents impersonated SOE agents and infiltrated the resistance movement. The Germans confiscated fifteen large drops by parachute of arms and supplies. Six SOE agents were air-dropped to assist Archdeacon and were immediately captured and imprisoned by the Germans.

The consequences of funkspiel on the Archdeacon network were duplicated over other areas of northern France. In total, between October 1943 and May 1944, the Germans carried out 150 successful operations against SOE capturing large amounts of arms and equipment, more than eight million francs, and nineteen agents, all of whom were executed in German concentration camps. One hundred and sixty seven French citizens who were working with SOE are also known to have been captured and sent to concentration camps, of whom less than one-half survived the war. Many other French citizens were arrested, but not sent to concentration camps, and most probably survived.

=== British response ===
By late July 1943, SOE headquarters had accepted the fact that many Prosper agents, including its leaders, had probably been captured. SOE F (French) Section sent its second in command, Nicolas Bodington, to Paris to ascertain Prosper's situation. Jack Agazarian, an experienced wireless operator, accompanied Bodington. "Gilbert Norman," impersonated on the radio by Goetz, invited the two of them to meet him at an apartment. Agazarian went to the meeting and was captured and later executed by the Germans. Bodington remained in Paris and was in contact with Noor Inayat Khan among others, attempting to put together the fragments of Prosper. He returned safely to London in August. SOE agents had voiced suspicions that Henri Déricourt, SOE's air operations officer in France, was a double agent working for the Germans. Bodington knew Déricourt, had met with him in France, and defended him. It was learned later that Déricourt had indeed given the Germans much information about the arrival and departure of SOE agents.

Encouraged that Bodington had learned that Khan and other SOE agents were still free, SOE continued to drop agents and supplies to networks scattered across France. Often they were captured or confiscated on their arrival. Unknown to the British, Noor was captured in October 1943. The Germans continued to play funkspiel with her radio and additional captured radios giving SOE the impression that SOE networks in northern France were still in operation.

In February 1944, SOE parachuted one of its best agents, France Antelme, into France to investigate the status of SOE agents and networks. Accompanying Antelme were wireless operator Lionel Lee and courier Madeleine Damerment, also experienced. The trio was captured on arrival as was Lee's radio. The Germans explained the subsequent lack of action and communication by Antelme by fabricating a story using Lee's radio that he had been injured on arrival and later died. Lee, however, misinformed the Germans about how he formatted his messages and SOE perceived that they were not authentic. Antelme, Lee, and Damerment were executed.

A factor in SOE's refusal to believe that its agents and networks in northern France were mostly destroyed may have been the precarious existence of the organization. SOE was the brainchild of Prime Minister Winston Churchill. Its creation was opposed by the British intelligence agency MI-6 and the Royal Air Force was unenthusiastic about diverting some of its air resources to supporting SOE operations. An acknowledgment that Prosper was defunct might also have given its many enemies in the British government the ammunition to ensure the demise of the organization. SOE continued to send agents and arms to France and to build on what remained of Prosper.

=== End of funkspiel ===
SOE headquarters slowly became aware of the extent of the compromise of the Prosper Network. On 27 March 1944, a captured radio responded to an SOE message with the words "Happy New Year." The correct response was "Merry Xmas. This latest indication that something was rotten in France inspired SOE official Gerry Morel to propose a test. Morel instructed SOE agent Frank Pickersgill, suspected to have been captured, to be at a certain place on 8 May to participate in an S-Phone conversation. The S-Phone was a newly-developed, short-range walkie-talkie which enabled a person on an airplane to have a voice conversation with a person on the ground. Pickersgill was in a concentration camp in what is now Poland. The SD had him returned to Paris, but Pickersgill was uncooperative, attacking and killing at least one guard and attempting to escape.

The SD chief in Paris, Josef Kieffer, had nobody on his staff who was a native English speaker, so he enlisted imprisoned SOE agent John Starr to imitate Pickersgill on the S-Phone call. Starr seemed to agree, but at the last minute declined and Kieffer had to use one of his men, who spoke imperfect English, to pose as Pickersgill. Morel on the airplane immediately perceived that the man on the ground he was speaking to was not Pickersgill.

SOE then tried another test by asking field agents to respond to personal questions, the answers to which the Germans were unlikely to know. Kieffer gathered together five captured SOE agents, plied them with alcohol and promised them pleasant accommodations if they would respond to the questions. All five declined. Three or four of the five were later executed. One of them, Marcel Rousett, escaped.

On 28 May 1944, the last SOE parachute drop was made to a compromised network. Funkspiel was dead. The Germans could not resist taunting SOE headquarters. Kieffer was ordered to send a message to his opposite number, Maurice Buckmaster, at the SOE. Kieffer said:

We thank you for the large deliveries of arms and ammunition which you have been kind enough to send us. We also appreciate the many tips you have given us regarding our plans and intentions which we have carefully noted. In case you are concerned about the health of some of the visitors you have sent us you may rest assured they will be treated with the consideration they deserve.

== Other uses ==
A similar Funkspiel technique, called Operation Scherhorn, was executed by the Soviet NKVD against Nazi secret services from August 1944 to May 1945.

Funkspiel also referred to a technique used by U-boat radio operators in which the frequency of transmission was changed consecutively to confuse Allied intelligence with the objective of picking up enemy transmissions on the original channel.

== See also ==
- Englandspiel, a similar radio game played by the Nazis with success in the Netherlands
