= France Antelme =

Member of Special Operations Executive

Major Joseph Antoine France Antelme OBE (12 March 1900 – 1944), no. 239255, was one of 14 Franco-Mauritians who served in the Special Operations Executive (SOE), a World War II British secret service that sent espionage agents, saboteurs and guerrilla fighters into enemy-occupied territory.

After being involved in undercover operations in Vichy-held Madagascar ahead of the allied landings there in May 1942, Antelme joined the SOE F (France) section in England. He undertook two missions in occupied France. On this third mission, early on 29 February 1944, he, along with SOE operatives Lionel Lee and Madeleine Damerment, parachuted under cover of darkness to a reception committee composed of the German Gestapo, and were captured. In accordance with Adolf Hitler's "Nacht und Nebel" directive regarding irregular combatants, he and 18 other captured SOE officers were executed at the Gross-Rosen concentration camp in Lower Silesia in July or August 1944.

== Early life ==
France Antelme was born on 12 March 1900 in Curepipe, British Mauritius, to an influential family of planters and politicians. After attending the Royal College Curepipe, he embarked on a career as broker and trader, travelling extensively between Mauritius, Réunion, Madagascar and South Africa. In 1932, he settled in Durban, Union of South Africa, as Madagascar's trade representative in South Africa. The following year he married Doris O'Toole. They had two sons, Michel and Gaston.

== Todd mission ==
Antelme was recruited by the SOE in November 1941 in Durban, South Africa where he was serving with the South African artillery. He formed part of the Todd mission, led by Lt. Col. J.E.S. Todd, whose task it was to gather intelligence on Madagascar and to try to win political leaders to the allied cause ahead of Operation Ironclad, the British landing at Diego Suarez, on 5 May 1942. He was landed by boat near Majunga (Mahajanga), Madagascar on 8 February 1942, and brought back political and military intelligence from the island, where he had many contacts. After serving at the Todd mission's operational headquarters in Dar es Salaam, Antelme was sent to England where he joined the SOE F section on 1 July 1942. He underwent training at Beaulieu and at Arisaig, Scotland.

== Missions to France ==
On his first mission to France, from November 1942 to March 1943, Antelme organized the BRICKLAYER circuit and established contacts with political circles and leading French civil servants with a view to supplying the allied expeditionary forces with food and currency. He was back in France in May that year, carrying messages from Winston Churchill to former French prime ministers Édouard Herriot and Paul Reynaud, inviting them to come to England. The mission started well with the demolition of the locomotive turntables at Le Mans. But when his fellow SOE officer and associate, Francis Suttill, was arrested on 23 June and his PROSPER circuit destroyed, Antelme was on the run.

He managed to evade the Gestapo for a month, being extracted from France by a Lysander aircraft on 20 July. He had failed to meet Herriot and Reynaud, but he learned that they were willing, though unable, to act. They were too well guarded for their extraction to be feasible. He nevertheless took back with him a valuable recruit — the well connected international lawyer, Maître W. J. Savy. Savy later returned to France and organized the WIZARD network that provided the intelligence leading to the destruction by the Allies of 2,000 V1 rockets.

While Antelme was in France, Noor Inayat Khan landed on 17 June 1943 as wireless operator to the PHONO circuit that he had set up. Antelme put Henri Garry in charge as sub-organiser for Francis Suttill's PROSPER circuit. Shortly after she arrived, PROSPER was betrayed and the Germans seized Suttill and his friends. Inayat Khan evaded capture, sending more than 20 messages on the run until she was betrayed by Garry's sister, Renée, four months later and arrested in her apartment. Garry was captured by the Gestapo shortly afterwards.

== Betrayal, capture and death ==
The seizure of Inayat Khan's wireless set and code-books enabled the Germans to play back false messages to London. Despite the growing certainty that the PHONO circuit was in German hands, Major Antelme volunteered to be dropped to a PHONO reception committee. He, his radio-operator, Captain Lionel Lee, and courier Madeleine Damerment — three of the SOE's best agents — took off from RAF Tempsford airfield in Bedfordshire late on 28 February 1944. Early the following morning, they parachuted into a field near the village of Saintville, some 50 km east of Chartres. The Gestapo was waiting for them. Reportedly in a towering rage, Antelme was taken to Gestapo headquarters at 84 Avenue Foch in Paris. Captured SOE agents were usually taken to 84 Avenue Foch for interrogation by German intelligence officer Josef Kieffer. Kiefer later said that only three of many captured SOE officers successfully refused to give him information: Inayat Khan, Canadian Frank Pickersgill, and Antelme.

Antelme was one of 18 SOE agents who were parachuted directly into enemy hands. Eleven of them, including Antelme, were dropped in February and March 1944 — despite strong evidence that the Germans had gained control of the SOE circuits with whom the drops were arranged.

Three weeks earlier another SOE team, consisting of Capt. J.P.H. Ledoux, Capt. F.A. Deniset, Lt. R.E.J. Alexandre, a Canadian arms instructor for Garry's circuit, and the Canadian radio operator, Lt. R. B. Byerly, had also been dropped to a German controlled PHONO reception. Shortly afterwards transmissions were received from Bylery's set, but they failed to contain the special messages that confirmed their authenticity.

The men of both teams died at the Gross-Rosen concentration camp in what is today the town of Rogoźnica in Lower Silesian Voivodeship, Poland. Madeleine Damerment was shot at the Dachau concentration camp on 13 September 1944 with fellow SOE agents Noor Inayat Khan, Yolande Beekman and Eliane Plewman.

== Memorials and decorations ==
Antelme is commemorated on the roll of honour of the Valençay SOE Memorial in France, on the Brookwood Memorial in Surrey, England, on the Cenotaph in Durban, South Africa and on a memorial at the Gross-Rosen concentration camp to the SOE officers who died there.

His decorations include the military OBE, Croix de Guerre avec Palme (France) and the chevalier de la Légion d'honneur.

== See also ==
- British military history of World War II
- Military history of France during World War II
- Resistance during World War II

== Bibliography ==
1. Service Record:Major Joseph Antoine France Antelme, no.239255, U.K. National Archives, Kew, Surrey
2. Basu, Shrabani (2007) Spy Princess - The life of Noor Inayat Khan, Omega, ISBN 978-0-930872-78-6
3. Foot, M.R.D. (1984) SOE: The Special Operations Executive 1940-46, Mandarin
4. Foot, M.R.D. (2004) SOE in France, Whitehall history publishing, ISSN 1474-8398
5. Grehan, J. and Mace, M. (2012) Unearthing Churchill’s Secret Army: The Official List of SOE Casualties and Their Stories, Pen and Sword, ISBN 978-1848847941
6. Harrison, E.D.R. (1999) British Subversion in French East Africa, 1941-1942: SOE's Todd Mission
7. Helm, Sarah (2007) A Life in Secrets, Anchor Books, ISBN 978-1-4000-3140-5
8. Marks, Leo (1998) Between Silk and Cyanide: A codemaker's war, 1941-1945, Touchstone books, ISBN 0-684-86422-3
9. Overton Fuller, Jean (1989) Dericourt: The Chequered Spy, Michael Russell (1989), ISBN 0-85955-149-0
10. Paturau, J. Maurice Agents secrets mauriciens en France
11. Suttill, Francis J. (2014), Shadows in the Fog: The True Story of Major Suttill and the Prosper French Resistance Network, The History Press, ISBN 978-0-7509-5591-1
12. Verity, Hugh (1978) We landed by Moonlight, Ian Allan, ISBN 978-0-947554-75-0
13. Vigurs, Kate (2021) Mission France: The True History of the Women of SOE, Yale University Press, ISBN 978-0-300-20857-3
