= Pierre Culioli =

Pierre Culioli (1912–1994), was a French tax officer who, during the World War II, led the ADOLPH resistance network in the triangle of land between Tours, Orléans and Vierzon. In late 1942 this was attached to the PHYSICIAN-Prosper group founded by Francis Suttill, which was part of section F (French Section) of SOE.

He was arrested by the Germans in Dhuizon on 21 June 1943 at the beginning of the collapse of the Prosper network and was deported and held in various places, including Buchenwald, but managed to escape.

== Biography ==
Culioli was born in Brest in 1914 and in 1938 married Ginette Dutems, a mayor's daughter from Mer who died in June 1940, a victim of a bombing raid. In appearance he was unprepossessing—a small, slight wiry man with a nervous manner, horn-rimmed spectacles, and a toothbrush moustache, allegedly grown in derision of Hitler's own.

He was the son and the grandson of French Army officers and himself became a regular French infantry lieutenant. He took part in the disastrous summer campaign of 1940, and was taken prisoner; however, he was soon repatriated on medical grounds and following his wife's death devoted himself to anti-Nazi activity in the middle Loire Valley.

Culioli and agent Yvonne Rudellat (code name Jacqueline) first worked for Raymond Flower, SOE's first organiser in his neighbourhood. Flower came to believe that Culioli was a double agent for the Germans and requested a poison pill to kill him. Culioli was furious that his loyalty had been questioned and he and Rudellat broke off relations with Flower (who was later recalled to Great Britain). Culioli and Rudellat created a sub-section of the vast Prosper Network which reached from the Belgian border to the Atlantic coast. His group settled in the Sologne, where it was known as the Reseau Adolphe, the 'Adolph Network'. Culioli posed as a forestry official, and settled down in a woodland cottage near Romorantin, now Romorantin-Lanthenay, in the Loire Valley, with his cover 'wife', Yvonne Rudellat, who acted as a courier. They ran an efficient small circuit, preparing for an expected major Allied invasion of France.

In mid-June 1943 they received a pair of Canadian SOE officers, John Kenneth Macalister and Frank Pickersgill, and all four of them set off on 21 June, in a car driven by Culioli, to catch a train from Beaugency to Paris where they were to meet Francis Suttill, who was by then organising the Prosper network. In the town of Dhuizon they were stopped at a temporary check point. Between Culioli and Rudellat on the front seat of the car lay a parcel containing incriminating material: wireless telegraphy equipment brought by the Canadians and unencrypted messages addressed to members of the Prosper network by their code names. The parcel was disguised as a Red Cross parcel addressed to a fictitious prisoner of war. The Germans ordered the two Canadians out of the back of the car; two Germans got in and ordered Culioli to drive to the mairie. There Culioli and Rudellat passed inspection of their papers; the parcel was queried but not inspected. They were given a laissez passer. They waited in the car outside in case the Canadians also got free. There were shouts for them to come back, so they shot off, Germans following in three cars. They came to a barricade near Braciuex (10 kilometres from Dhuizon) and drove straight at it. The Germans manning the barricade opened fire as they approached, shattering the windscreen. Rudellat, who was looking out of the rear window for following Germans, was hit in the back of the head. Assuming she was dead, Culioli, not having his suicide capsule, tried to kill himself by steering the car into a wall but it bounced off harmlessly. Culioli was uninjured but was subsequently shot in the leg by a German while trying to get killed resisting arrest.

Culioli survived Buchenwald, and managed to escape from captivity whilst being transferred from one camp to another at the end of the war. (Note: Rudellat died of typus in Bergen-Belsen concentration camp just after it was liberated by the Allies. She had been incarcerated under a false name and was buried in a mass grave.)

In 1947-49 Culioli became the centre of a cause celebre; he was accused of having betrayed the whole Prosper network which had been rolled up immediately after his arrest. This was on the strength of some information Culioli had given to the Germans, which had betrayed about half the supplies sent to the group. Found guilty at his first trial, Culioli was acquitted at his second in 1949.

He never fully recovered from his spell in Buchenwald, or from his post war experiences. In 1950 he was the subject of a book written by Abbé Guillaume, La Sologne au temps de l'heroisme et de la trahison which served to clear his reputation as far as the general public was concerned, and he became viewed as a war hero. He died near Blois 8 August 1994.

== Sources ==
- M. R. D. Foot SOE: an Outline History of the Special Operations Executive, 1940-1946. London: British Broadcasting Corporation, 1984 ISBN 978-0-7126-6585-8
- M. R. D. Foot, Obituary in The Independent newspaper, 5 September 1994.
- King, Stella, 'Jacqueline', Pioneer Heroine of the Resistance, Arms and Armour Press, 1989
