= Avenue de Suffren =

Avenue in Paris, France

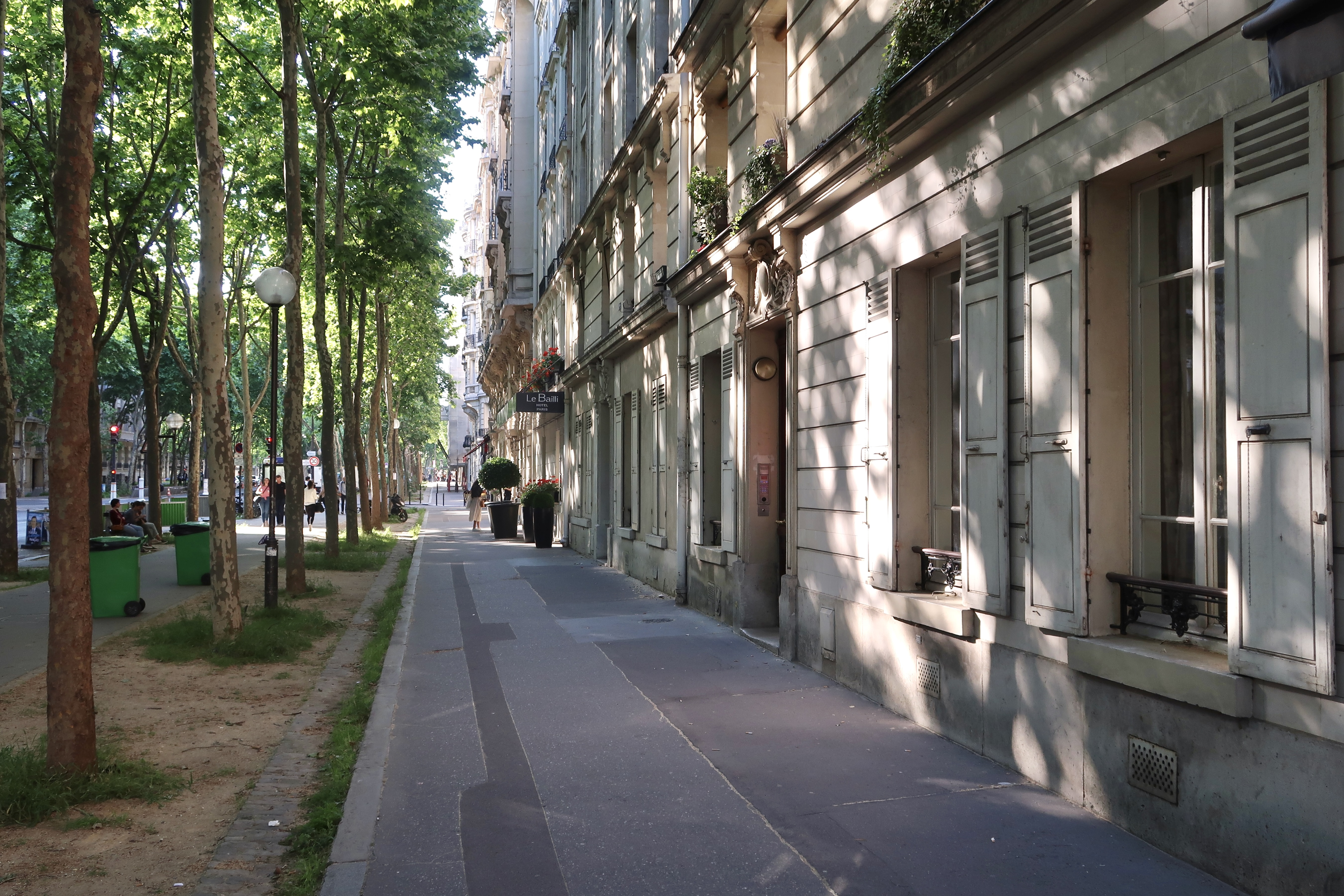
- Avenue de Suffren near Ségur Métro station

- Location within Paris
- Length: 1,850 m (6,070 ft)
- Width: 25 m (82 ft)
- Arrondissement: 7th, 15th
- Quarter: Palais Royal. Place Vendôme. Gaillon.
- Coordinates: 48°51′06″N 2°18′01″E

Construction
- Completion: 1867

The Avenue de Suffren is an avenue situated between the 7th and 15th arrondissements of Paris. It is named for the 18th-century admiral Pierre André de Suffren.

== Location and access ==
The Avenue de Suffren has one of its extremities at the Quai Branly and the others at the Boulevard Garibaldi near the Place de la République-de-Panama. It intersects the avenues La Motte-Picquet, Lowendal, Ségur and Rue Pérignon.

The Rue de Buenos-Aires, Avenue Octave-Gréard, Rue Jean-Rey, Rue du Général-Lambert, Rue Desaix, Avenue Joseph-Bouvard, Rue Jean-Pierre-Bloch, Rue Champfleury, Rue de Presles, Avenue du Général-Détrie, Rue de la Fédération, Rue Jean-Carriès, Rue Dupleix, Avenue de Champaubert, Rue du Laos, Rue de l'Abbé-Roger-Derry, Rue Mario-Nikis, Rue Chasseloup-Laubat, Rue Valentin-Haüy, Rue Bellart, Rue Rosa-Bonheur, and Rue Barthélemy have an extremity at the Avenue de Suffren.

Metro station Ségur on Paris Métro Line 10 is at the intersection of the Avenue de Suffren and the Rue Pérignon.

== History ==
The avenue was opened between what is now the Quai Branly and the Avenue de Lowendal when the Champ de Mars was built, around 1770. In 1838, the Minister of Finances transferred authority on the avenue to the City of Paris.

In 1867, it was decided to prolongate the avenue up to the Rue Barthélémy and the Boulevard de Grenelle (now the Boulevard Garibaldi). The Abattoirs de Grenelle slaughterhouse had to be destroyed to allow the project to proceed.

== Significant spots ==
- No 74 : location of the Grande Roue de Paris, built for the Exposition universelle of 1900 and dismantled in 1937.
- No 78 : Village suisse.
- Nos 92–94 : building designed in 1929 by architects Jean Boucher and Paul Delaplanche, ornated with sculptures by F.-P. Joyeux.
- No 106 : formerly a brothel. During the Occupation, it was popular among officers of the Wehrmacht, and thus became target of a bombing by a group of Resistants under Pierre Georges (later known as Colonel Fabien), along with Georges Tondelier, Gaultier and another member of the Bataillons de la jeunesse known only as "Paul". The spot is now a modern building.
- No 120 : Henri Michaux lived there between 1968 and his death in 1984.
- No 125 : entrance of the conference centre of the World Heritage Centre where general conferences of UNESCO are held.
- No 145 : Embassy of Panama in France.
- No 158 bis : birthplace of Robert Wogensky (painter, 1919–2019).
- At the angle with the Avenue de Ségur, the Caisse autonome nationale de sécurité des mineurs. The building was designed in 1922 by architects Davidson and René Patouillard-Demoriane.
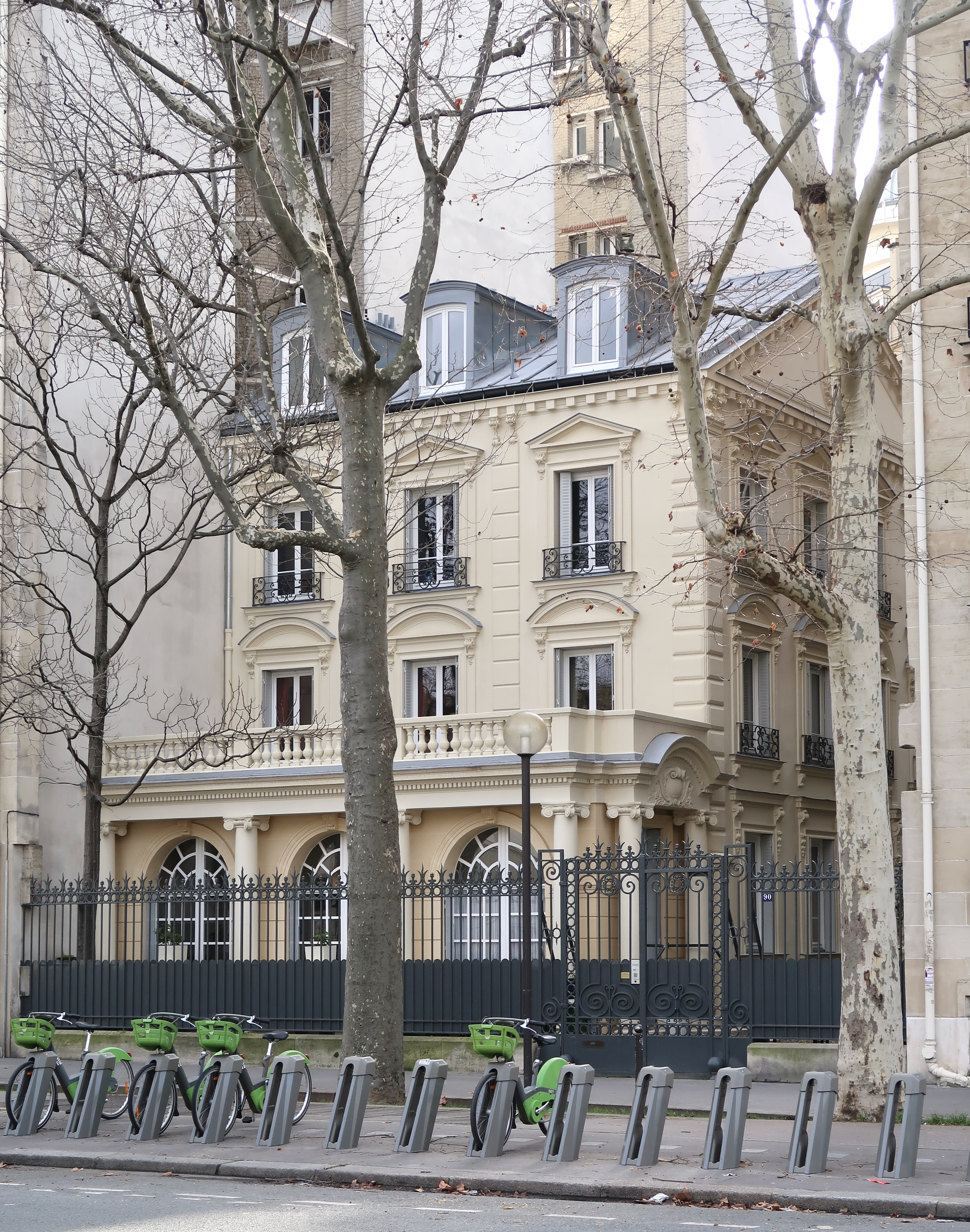
No. 90

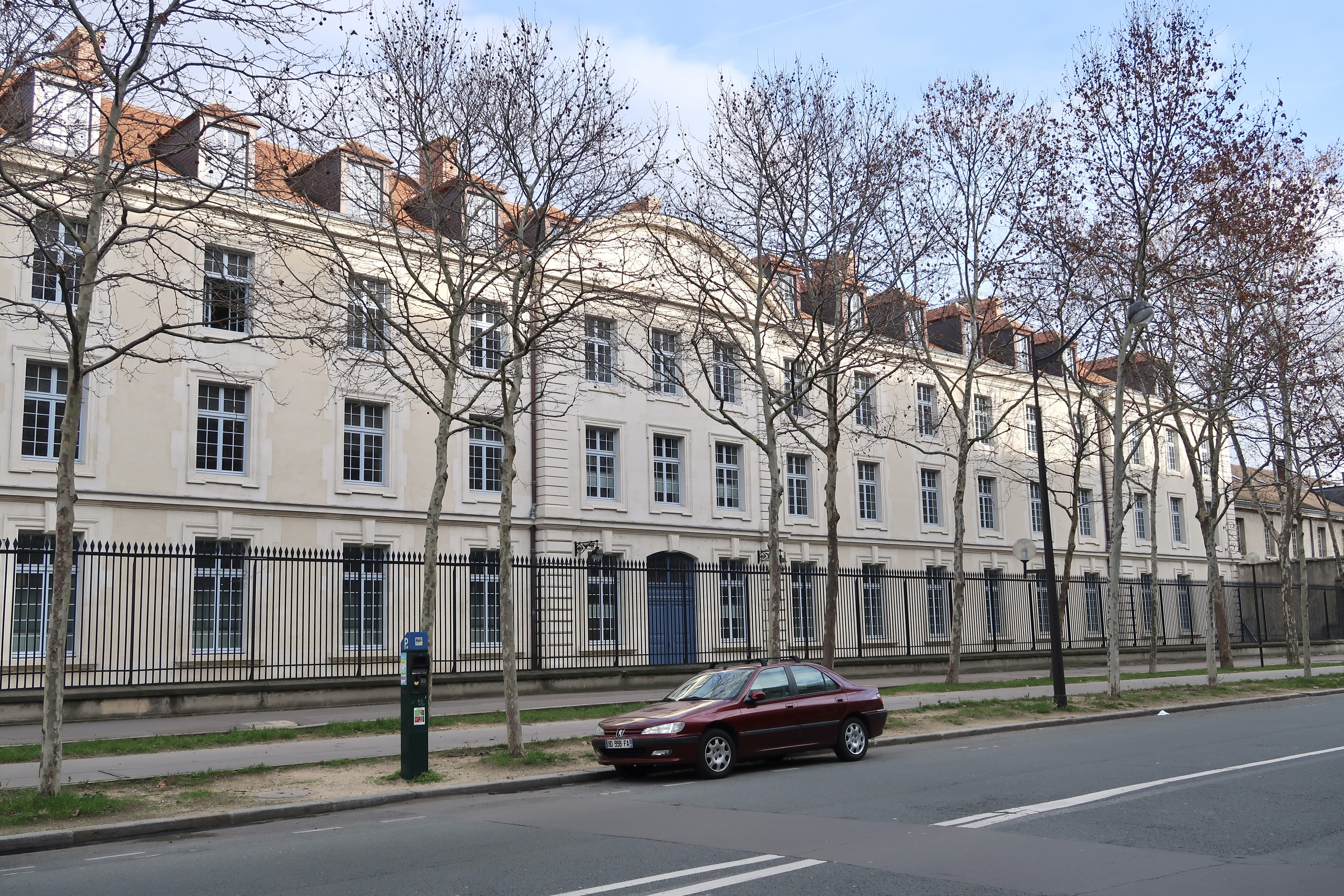
South façade of the École militaire

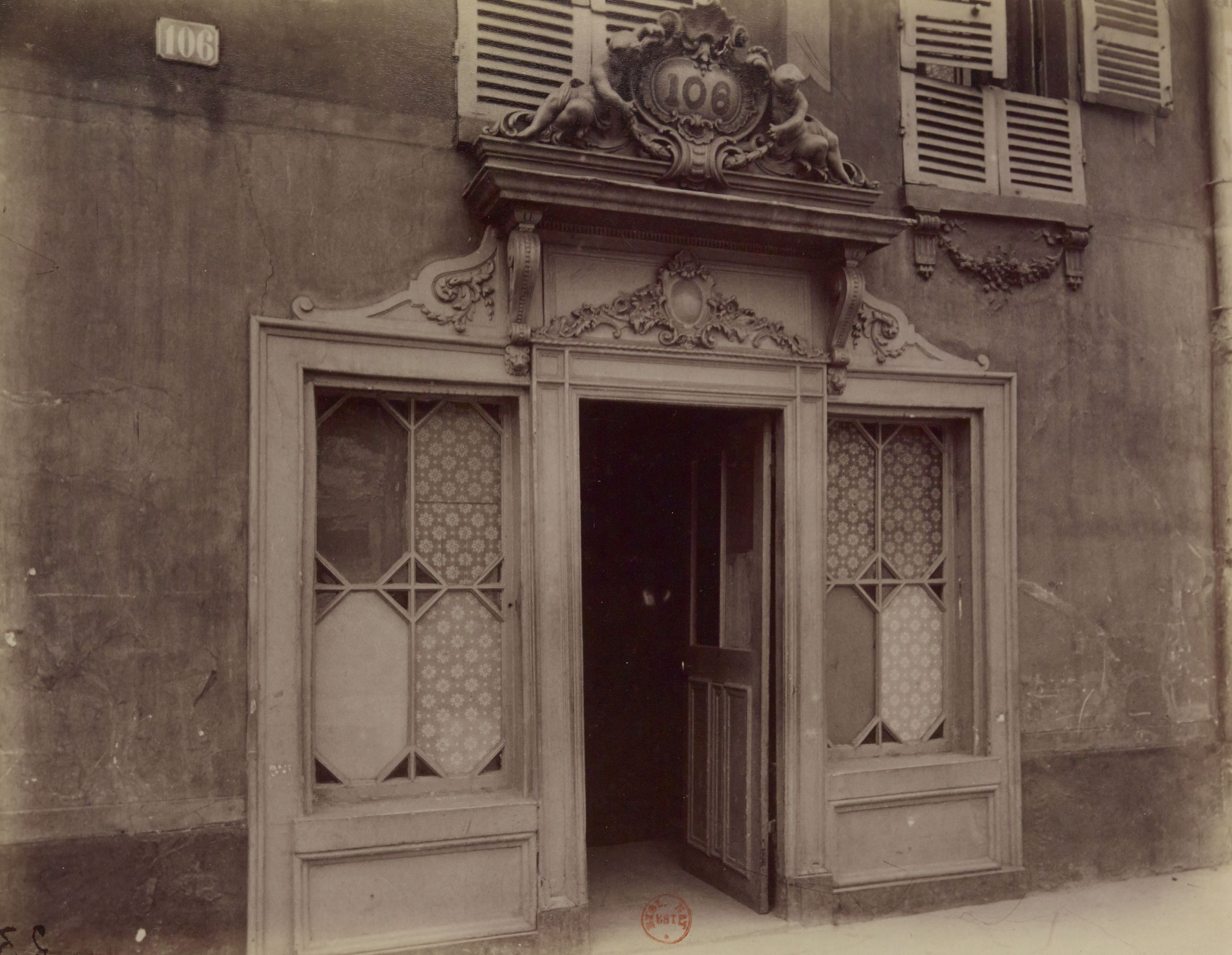
Façade of the brothel at no. 106, photographed between 1910 and 1912 by Eugène Atget

== Bibliography ==
- Hermann, Brigitte; Sophie-Marguerite (2010). Paris 15^{e}. Balades et bonnes adresses (in French). Paris: Christine Bonneton éditeur. p. 224. ISBN 978-2-86253-492-3..

== See also ==
- 7e arrondissement de Paris
- 15e arrondissement de Paris
