= 84 Avenue Foch =

Head office of the Sicherheitsdienst in Paris

Coordinates: 48°52′21″N 2°16′41″E

- Vierundachtzig Avenue Foch

General information
- Location: 84 Avenue Foch, Paris, France

84 Avenue Foch (German: Avenue Foch vierundachtzig) was the Parisian headquarters of the Sicherheitsdienst (SD), the counter-intelligence branch of the SS during the German occupation of Paris in World War II.

Avenue Foch is a wide residential boulevard in the 16th arrondissement that connects the Arc de Triomphe with the Porte Dauphine on the border with the Bois de Boulogne. During the German occupation of Northern France, the buildings at numbers 82 and 86, either side of 84, were also commandeered by the German occupation forces.

== Counter-espionage activities ==
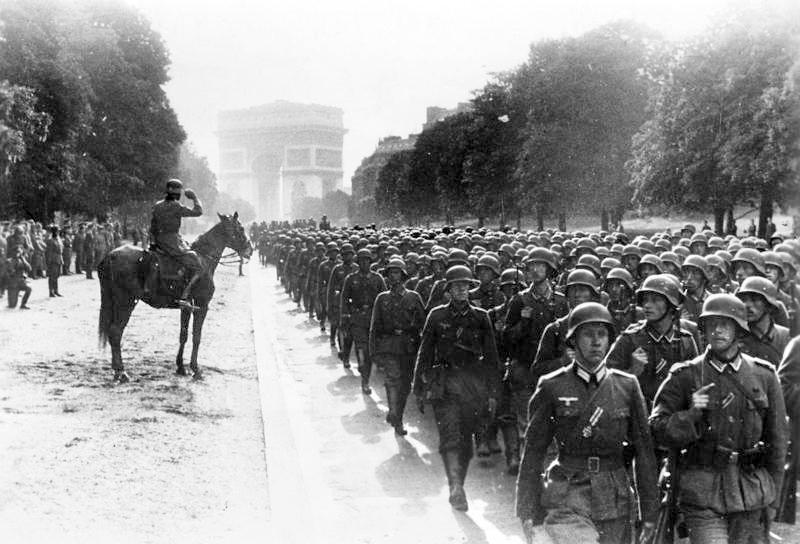
Wehrmacht troops of the 30th Infantry Division marching on Avenue Foch on 14 June 1940

Number 84 was used for the interrogation of allied SOE agents captured in France (including, for example, Frank Pickersgill, Diana Rowden, and Violette Szabo). Prisoners were regularly brought to the building from Fresnes prison on the outskirts of the city.

The second floor was used by the SD's Wireless unit known as Section IV. It was under the control of Dr. Josef Goetz. The SD used captured allied wireless sets to transmit bogus coded messages in attempts to flush out resistance groups. The operation was colloquially known as Funkspiel (the 'radio game').

The third floor was used by SS-Standartenführer Helmut Knochen, who was appointed as senior commander of security in Paris in 1940. In 1942, Knochen's jurisdiction stretched from northern France to Belgium. He was involved in the deportation of French Jews to concentration camps.

The fourth floor was used by SS-Sturmbannführer Josef Kieffer, the commander of number 84, as an office and private quarters. His assistants, SS officer's Ernst Misselwitz and Heinrich Meiners, also had an office on this floor.

On the fifth (top) floor contained a guardroom, an interpreter's office, and cells for prisoners under interrogation.

A senior interrogator at number 84 was Ernest Vogt, a Swiss-German civilian who since 1940 had been attached to the SD as a civil auxiliary in the capacity of translator and interpreter.

== See also ==
- Pierre Brossolette, a notable French Resistance leader, killed himself by leaping from the sixth floor of 84 Avenue Foch.
- Carlingue, French auxiliaries working for the RSHA
- Peter Churchill, a British secret agent was tortured and held here.
- Harold Cole, a British traitor who served the SD and Gestapo in occupied France.
- Ernst Misselwitz, Head of Gestapo - Reich Security Main Office (RSHA) at 84 Avenue Foch.
- Frank Pickersgill, a Canadian Special Operations Executive agent, attacked a guard and leaped from a second-storey window, but was shot and recaptured.
- Rue des Saussaies - Paris Head quarters of the Gestapo.
