= Pierre de Vomécourt =

French SOE agent (1906-1986)

Pierre de Crevoisier de Vomécourt (1 January 1906, Chassey-lès-Montbozon, Haute-Saône – 1986), code names Etienne, Lucas, and Sylvain, was an agent of the United Kingdom's clandestine Special Operations Executive during World War II. The purpose of SOE was to conduct espionage, sabotage and reconnaissance in occupied Europe against the Axis powers. SOE agents allied themselves with French Resistance groups and supplied them with weapons and equipment parachuted in from England (weapons also arrived by sea and SOE was responsible for ensuring that the resistance supported the allied strategy coordinated from London).

Vomécourt founded and headed SOE's first Resistance network (also called circuit) in occupied France. His AUTOGIRO network operated in and around Paris from May 1941 to April 1942. He was captured by the Germans in April 1942. After nearly a year of mostly solitary confinement in Fresnes Prison near Paris, he spent the rest of the war imprisoned in Nazi Germany in Colditz Castle, a POW camp for military officers. He was freed by the allied armies in April 1945.

In the estimation of the official historian of SOE, M. R. D. Foot, Vomecourt was SOE's "first important agent in France." Vomécourt's "early role was of essential importance" in establishing the framework for British assistance to French groups resisting the German occupation. The first of many hundreds of SOE airdrops of arms and equipment for the French Resistance was arranged by Vomécourt and his wireless operator, Georges Bégué. Vomécourt also unmasked the double agent Mathilde Carré, "the Cat." His older brother, Philippe de Vomécourt, was also an important resistance leader.

== Early life ==
The Vomėcourts were an aristocratic family from Lorraine, on the border with Germany. Pierre's great-grandfather was killed in the War of 1870 with Germany and his father was killed in 1914 in World War I. He had two older brothers, Jean and Philippe, both of whom also worked in the French Resistance. Pierre was educated at Beaumont College in Old Windsor, England. Vomécourt was married to Micheline Sally, and had two daughters.

Vomécourt was "a vigorous, talkative, good-looking man in his middle thirties, a good shot, a fast thinker, full of energy and enthusiasm."

== World War II ==
At the beginning of World War II in 1939, Vomécourt joined the French army and became a liaison officer and interpreter with the Scottish Rifles. He was evacuated with British forces from Dunkirk in June 1940. His family remained in France, living in Paris. In London, he tried unsuccessfully to interest the Free French Forces of Charles de Gaulle in supporting his plans for resistance to the German occupation of France. He then met the leaders of SOE, and was recruited into their F (French) section for training, with the codename of Lucas.

=== SOE ===
On the night of 10/11 May 1941 Vomécourt was parachuted into France near Châteauroux. Roger Cottin soon followed, parachuting into France on the night of 13/14 May. Vomécourt and Cottin were the second and third SOE agents to enter France. He was met by radio operator, Georges Bégué, who was the first SOE agent to parachute into France. Pierre recruited his brothers to work in the Resistance and the three Vomécourt brothers met at Philippe's estate near Limoges and divided up resistance zones among themselves. Jean chose to work in eastern France, based in Pontarlier; Philippe chose Limoges as his base; and Pierre along with Cottin and Bégué would work in the north and set up a resistance network, called AUTOGIRO, based in Paris.

On 13 June 1941, SOE airdropped two CLE Canisters onto Bas Soleil, Philippe de Vomécourt's estate 15 kilometres (9.3 miles) east of Limoges, France. The canisters were dropped by an Armstrong Whitworth Whitley bomber and contained sub-machine guns, explosives, and other materials. Pierre and wireless operator Bégué arranged for the airdrop. These canisters were the first of nearly 60,000 canisters loaded with supplies and arms which SOE air-dropped to agents and resistance groups during World War II.

=== Pierre and the Cat ===
Vomécourt's wireless operator Georges Bégué was arrested in October 1941 and his replacement, André Bloch, was arrested by the Germans in November. Vomécourt was scathing about SOE's "incredible ignorance of local (i.e. anti-Semitic) conditions" in sending Bloch to France. Vomécourt reported that Bloch was denounced as a Jew and arrested, at which point it was discovered that he was an SOE radio operator. Bloch was executed three months later.

Without a wireless operator, Vomécourt had no means of communicating with London. His immediate need was money. He had financed nearly all the expenses of the network from his own pocket. Through an attorney in Paris, he was introduced on 26 December 1941 to a 32-year-old woman named Mathilde Carré who was a leader of a Franco/Polish espionage network known as INTERALLIÉ. She was nicknamed La Chatte, i.e. "the Cat"); her code name was Victoire and she was also called Lily. She said she had access to a wireless and could arrange for the transmittal of messages from Voméecourt to London. He was initially suspicious and tested her with a message to London asking SOE in London for money. Two days later SOE responded and Carré told him a British agent would give him the money in Vichy. Vomécourt went to Vichy and received the money. SOE headquarters was aware of Interallié and had been working with them.

What neither SOE headquarters nor Vomécourt knew was that Interallié was "burned" and that Carré was working for the German intelligence agency, the Abwehr. In October 1941, the Interallié had come to the attention of the Germans and a sergeant who spoke French, Hugo Bleicher, was tasked with infiltrating the network. A captured agent gave Bleicher names and addresses of Interallié members. In November, twenty-one members of Interallié were arrested by the Abwehr in Cherbourg and on 17 November the leaders, including Carré, were arrested in Paris. The Germans also captured four radio transmitters. Bleicher persuaded Carré, with the option of being executed otherwise, to work for the Germans. Carré introduced Bleicher to Vomécourt as "Jean Castell," a Belgian resistance leader. Carré also became Bleicher's lover.

Vomécourt was still suspicious of Carré and in January 1942, his suspicions were heightened. He asked her to procure forged identity cards and she complied quickly, too quickly in his opinion and the cards were too good. Challenged, she admitted she was working for the Germans. Vomécourt then hatched a plan for Carré to persuade the Germans that she should go to SOE headquarters in London with him. Carré persuaded the Germans that she could return to France with valuable information about SOE. The Abwehr accepted her story and in early February, sent a message to London, supposedly from Vomécourt, requesting immediate evacuation from France of Vomécourt and Carré, saying their lives were in danger. After many misadventures, the two reached England by boat on 27 February. This was the end of Carré's career as a double and triple agent. She was interrogated and imprisoned for the remainder of the war.

=== Return to France and capture ===
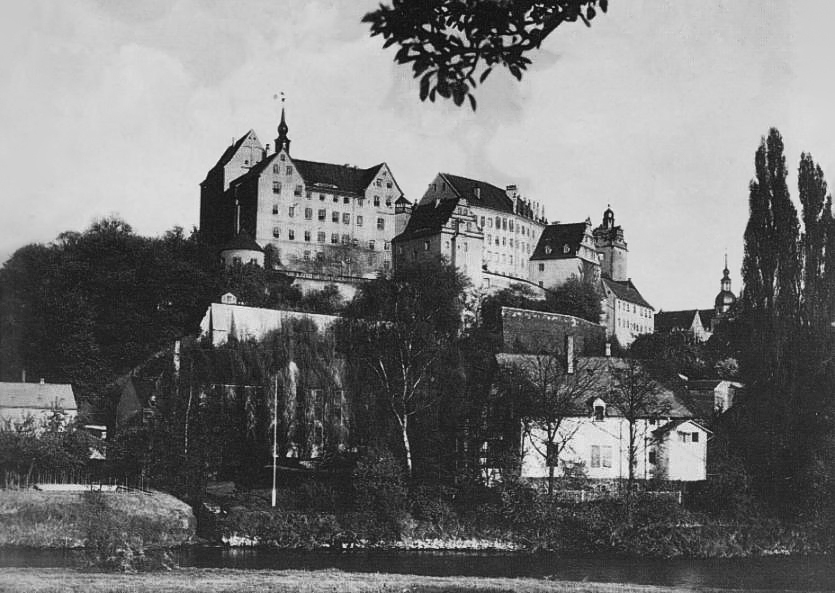
Colditz Castle POW camp in 1945.

In London, Vomécourt met with the highest levels of the British government, including War Secretary Anthony Eden and Field Marshal Alan Brooke, and gave them his assessment of the German army in France, the Resistance, and the SOE's work. He wanted to return to France as soon as possible and proposed a plan of returning with Carré and, among other things, assassinating Bleicher. His plans were turned down and on 1 April 1942, he was parachuted blind (no reception party) onto his brother Philippe's estate near Limoges. He took on a new code name, Sylvain. The Germans were apparently still unaware that Carré was now working with the British.

The arrival of a new wireless operator for Vomécourt was delayed and he was forced to use a courier who carried messages to SOE agent Virginia Hall, an American in Vichy France. His courier was captured and the papers he carried were confiscated. Hugo Bleicher recognized Vomécourt's handwriting on one of the documents and realized he was back in France. Bleicher began arresting known associates of Vomécourt and learned from one of them of a meeting at a Paris cafe that Vomécourt was to attend. Vomécourt was arrested at the cafe on 25 April. After his arrest, Vomécourt and Bleicher had an amiable meeting at which both bemoaned their betrayal by "the Cat."

With the arrest of Vomécourt and his associates the pioneering Autogiro network was destroyed. The men were initially held in Fresnes Prison in Paris. Put on trial near the end of 1942, Vomécourt persuaded the judges "by a final effort of personality" to give him and his associates the protection of the Geneva Convention as prisoners of war (POWs), thereby avoiding the fate of being sent to a Nazi concentration camp and executed. Vomécourt and his associates were transferred to the relative comfort of a POW camp for officers at Colditz Castle. Allied forces freed him on 15 April 1945.

Pierre de Vomécourt's brother Jean was captured and executed by the Germans during the war. His brother Philippe was captured by French police in 1942, but escaped in 1944, and returned to working with the Resistance and SOE.

== Sources ==
- Michael Richard Daniell Foot, SOE in France. An account of the Work of the British Special Operations Executive in France, 1940–1944, London, Her Majesty's Stationery Office, 1966, 1968; Whitehall History Publishing, in association with Frank Cass, 2004.
- (in French) Benjamin Cowburn, Sans cape ni épée, Gallimard, 1958.
