= Neue Bremm =

Coordinates: 49°12′40″N 6°57′56″E

- Gestapo concentration camp
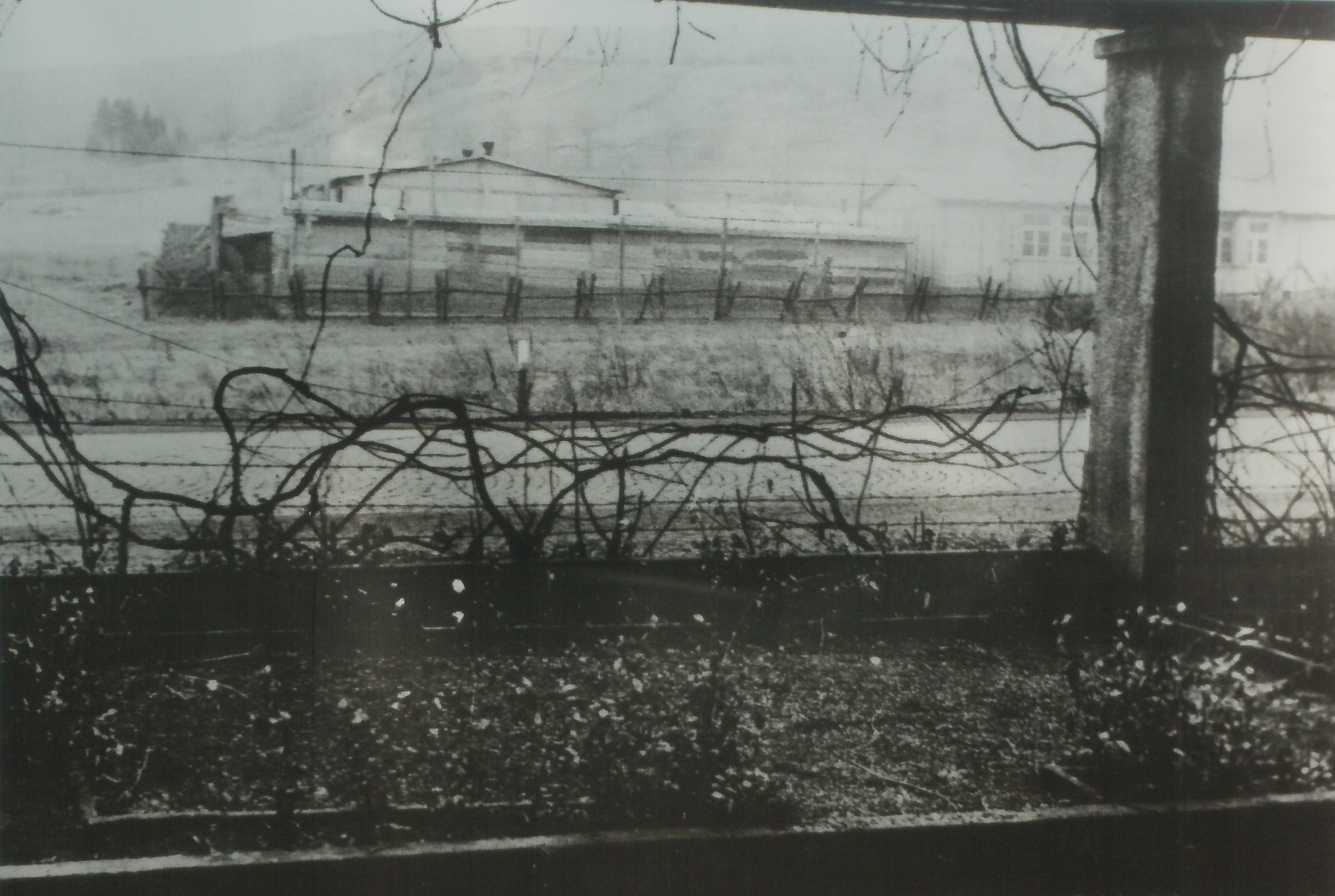
- Barracks of Neue Bremm at Saarbrücken

Operation
- Period: Beginning of 1943 until the end of 1944

Prisoners
- Total: 20,000 (cumulative number)
- Victims: Unknown

Neue Bremm (German: Gedenkstätte Gestapo-Lager Neue Bremm) was a Nazi torture camp in Saarbrücken, set up in 1943 by the Gestapo intentionally with no oversight from other institutions. It was designed to break prisoners who were not destined for immediate death. Some prisoners were held only for a few weeks, others, much longer; both men, and women. During that time they were put to work in slave-labour commandos and broken. Those who survived purposeful starvation were sent on to Nazi concentration camps such as Buchenwald. Approximately 20,000 men and women passed through Neue Bremm, including Jews from occupied Eastern Europe as well as Frenchmen, Belgians, Britons and Italians. However, the total number of casualties remains unknown.

Short term torture camps like Neue Bremm were called Straflager. The torture is reported to have included hopping crouched for 6 to 8 hours a day. Further, they were starved and deprived of sleep. The Straflager camps held the same pains as the other Nazi concentration camps in German-occupied Europe but with corporal punishment compacted into just days.

After the war, the French military put dozens of Neue Bremm personnel, including the commandant, Fritz Schmoll, on trial for war crimes. A number of them, including Schmoll, were found guilty and executed. Others were given prison sentences.
