= Dhuizon =

- Commune
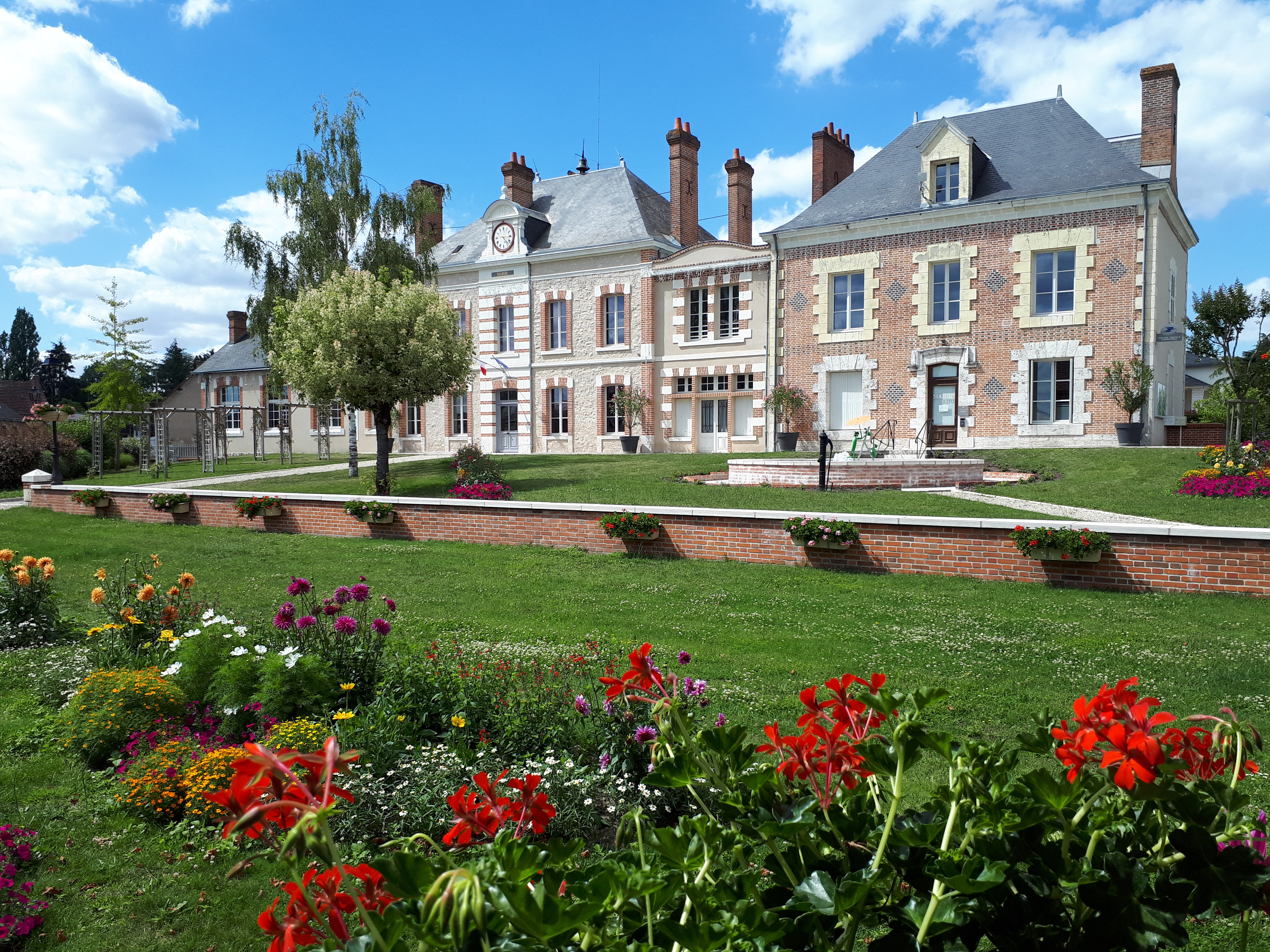
- Town hall of Dhuizon
- Location of Dhuizon
- Location within France Location within Centre-Val de Loire
- Coordinates: 47°35′21″N 1°39′32″E
- Country: France
- Region: Centre-Val de Loire
- Department: Loir-et-Cher
- Arrondissement: Romorantin-Lanthenay
- Canton: Chambord
- Intercommunality: Sologne des étangs

Government
  - Mayor (2020–2026): Michel Buffet
- Area^{1}: 43.34 km^{2} (16.73 sq mi)
- Elevation: 115 m (377 ft)
- Highest elevation: 132 m (433 ft)
- Lowest elevation: 86 m (282 ft)
- Population (2023): 1,195
  - Density: 27.57/km^{2} (71.41/sq mi)
- Time zone: UTC+01:00 (CET)
  - Summer (DST): UTC+02:00 (CEST)
- INSEE/Postal code: 41074 /41220
- ^{1} French Land Register data, which excludes lakes, ponds, glaciers > 1 km^{2} (0.386 sq mi or 247 acres) and river estuaries.

Dhuizon (pronounced [dɥizɔ̃]) is a commune in the Loir-et-Cher department in the region of Centre-Val de Loire, France.

It is located about 27.5 km (17.1 mi) from Romorantin.

== Population ==
Historical population
Year	Pop.	±% p.a.
1968	1,063	—
1975	1,086	+0.31%
1982	1,057	−0.39%
1990	1,100	+0.50%
1999	1,254	+1.47%
2007	1,382	+1.22%
2012	1,323	−0.87%
2017	1,233	−1.40%
2023	1,195	−0.52%
Source: INSEE

== See also ==
- Communes of the Loir-et-Cher department
