= Duel of Wits =

1953 book by Peter Churchill

- Author: Peter Churchill
- Language: English
- Genre: Non-fiction
- Publisher: Hodder and Stoughton
- Publication date: 1953

Duel of Wits is a book written by Peter Churchill, DSO, Croix de Guerre, published in 1953. It was the second of three books describing his wartime experience in the French section of the Special Operations Executive in which he was infiltrated four times into occupied France and spent 225 days behind enemy lines before he was captured.

== Synopsis ==
Duel of Wits was the second of three books describing his wartime experience in the French section of the Special Operations Executive.

He describes his second mission in April 1942 which was to deliver two SOE wireless operators in Antibes by submarine and then a further SOE wireless operator and another SOE agent on a special mission to organise the VIC Escape Line, who were dropped off nearby at the Pointe d’Agay. He then returned to the UK.

In his third mission he was parachuted near Montpellier in August 1942 to organise and coordinate the SOE F Section "Spindle" Network. During this time he developed a close relationship with his French courier Odette whom he was to marry after the war. In November 1942 Germany occupied the southern zone of France and it became to too dangerous to continue living and working in the French Riviera and Churchill relocated the Spindle network to St Jorioz, on the shore of Lake Annecy. Difficulties flared up in the leadership of the CARTE network, and its leader, André Girard, and Churchill were ordered to fly to the UK for talks, but a succession of pickup attempts by the RAF failed. Eventually Girard was flown back to London, and Churchill and the CARTE chief of staff, Henri Frager, were flown back at the fifth attempt. On 15 April 1943 Churchill was then parachuted back to St Jorioz where he was met by Odette Sansom, but they were both arrested the following day by Abwehr spycatcher, Hugo Bleicher.

In The Spirit in the Cage, the last book of this trilogy, Churchill describes his captivity and subsequent liberation at the end of the war, and also the terrible torture endured by Odette.
