= Peter Churchill =

British SOE officer (1909 – 1972)

Peter Morland Churchill
- Born: 14 January 1909; Amsterdam, Netherlands
- Died: 1 May 1972 (aged 63); Le Rouret, France
- Spouse(s): Odette Sansom (m. 1947; div. 1956) Irene Hoyle (m. 1957)
- Relatives: Walter Churchill (brother); Oliver Churchill (brother)
- Military career
- Allegiance: United Kingdom
- Branch: British Army
- Service years: 1940–1945
- Rank: Captain
- Service number: 162707
- Units: Army Intelligence Corps; Special Operations Executive
- Conflicts: Second World War
- Awards: Distinguished Service Order; Croix de Guerre (France)

Peter Morland Churchill, DSO Croix de Guerre (14 January 1909 – 1 May 1972) was a British Special Operations Executive (SOE) officer in France during the Second World War. His wartime operations, which resulted in his capture and imprisonment in German concentration camps and his subsequent marriage to fellow SOE officer Odette Sansom, received considerable attention after the war, including a 1950 film.

On 29 December 2024 he was inducted into the Spengler Cup Ice Hockey Hall of Fame in Davos, Switzerland, in recognition of his exceptional ice hockey playing in the 1930s and will be represented in the ice hockey museum there.

== Early life ==
He was born in Amsterdam on 14 January 1909, the son of William Algernon Churchill (1865–1947), a British Consul who served in Mozambique, Amsterdam, Pará in Brazil, Stockholm, Milan, Palermo, and Algiers, and Violet Myers (1875-1943). His father was also an art connoisseur, and author of what is still the standard reference work on early European paper and papermaking, Watermarks in Paper,. He was a brother of Walter Churchill DSO DFC, a Royal Air Force pilot during the war, and Oliver Churchill DSO MC, also an SOE officer.

== Education and career ==
He was educated at Malvern School from 1923–27, then spent 18 months at Chillon Castle, then went on to Geneva University. From 1929–32, he read Modern Languages at Gonville and Caius College, Cambridge. In addition to his native English, he was bilingual in French and fluent in Spanish and Italian. He also excelled in sports – he had the reputation of being one of the finest ice-hockey blues the university had produced. Churchill was Captain of the Cambridge University Ice Hockey Club in 1932 and won 15 international caps. He was proficient at exhibition diving, a first-class skier, and played golf off a six handicap.

He moved into the British diplomatic service and served as British Vice-Consul in the Netherlands from 1934–5, and Pro-Consul in Oran, Algeria from 1935–6. From September 1939 to August 1940, he was Under Secretary to Sir Norman Birkett in the Home Office Advisory Committee, and later became President of the Committee.

== Wartime activities ==
At the outbreak of the Second World War, he was commissioned into the Intelligence Corps and also underwent commando training. In April 1941, joined the Special Operations Executive as one of its early recruits and assigned to the French Section in June 1941. He was infiltrated into France four times, twice by submarine and twice by aircraft, and spent 225 days behind enemy lines.

=== First mission ===
In Operation WILLOW, his mission was to inspect three SOE networks in the south of France, evaluate their strengths and weaknesses, assess their needs, and give them instructions. He was also given two million francs (equivalent to approximately £480,000 / €500,000 in 2019) to distribute between the three networks, with 400,000 francs for Francis Basin «Laurent» of the URCHIN network in Antibes, 300,000 francs for Georges Duboudin «Charles» of the SPRUCE network in Lyon, and 300,000 francs for Ted Coppin «Olivier» of the DONKEYMAN network in Marseille. The other million francs was destined for Colonel Deprez in Marseille to facilitate the release of 10 French patriots from Fort St Nicholas prison in Marseille.

On 1 January 1942, submarine P36 took him 2 miles offshore Miramar (Théoule-sur-Mer) from where he paddled to the shore by canoe at night. The next morning he walked 25 km to Antibes where he met his first contact, Dr Élie Lévy «Louis», who introduced him to Baron d'Astier de la Vigerie «Bernard», head of Lyon resistance group known as ‘The Last Column’.

Using false identity papers of an Argentinian journalist, he then travelled by train with «Bernard» to Lyon to meet Virginia Hall «Germaine», an American agent, who put him in contact with Duboudin. He then went by train to Marseille where Hall introduced him to Ted Coppin and Colonel Deprez.

Having completed his mission, Churchill returned to the UK. Travelling as a couple to reduce suspicion, Hall accompanied him on a train to Perpignan, and with a guide he crossed the Pyrenees overnight on foot and walked about 80 km to Bañolas near Figueras. He was then driven to Gibraltar, crossing the Spanish border hidden in the car’s boot, and on 14 February 1943 was flown back to London for debriefing.

=== Second mission ===
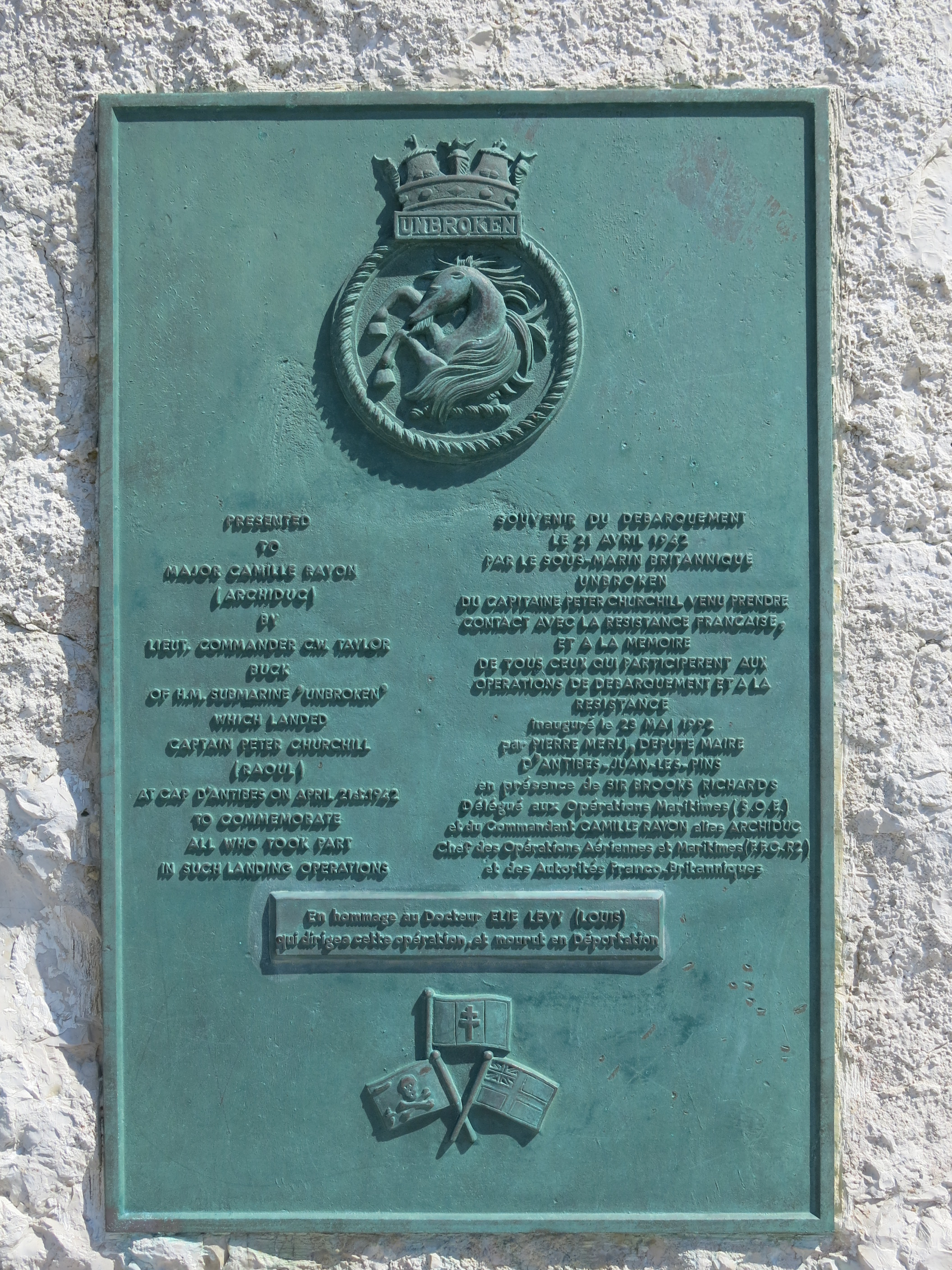
Monument commemorating the landing of Capt. Peter Churchill from HMS Unbroken at Cap d'Antibes on 21 April 1942

Operation DELAY II was a brief mission to deliver four SOE agents by submarine to the French Riviera.

In April 1942, Churchill travelled from Gibraltar in HM Submarine P 42 "Unbroken" with three radio operators, Isidore Newman «Julien» for the URCHIN network and Edward Zeff «Matthieu» for the SPRUCE network, Marcel Clech «Bastien» for the AUTOGIRO network, and Victor Gerson «René», an SOE agent on a special mission to organise the VIC Escape Line On the night of 21 April, Churchill led Newman and Zeff by canoe to the shore at Antibes with their radios and took them to the house of Dr Élie Lévy, who asked him to take «Bernard» back with him to the UK. Churchill returned to the submarine with «Bernard», after which Clech and Gerson were dropped off by canoe at the Pointe d’Agay and Churchill returned to the UK.

==== Proposed next mission ====
On his return Col Buckmaster gave Churchill his next mission which was to blow up a powerful radio transmitter at Sainte-Assise near Fontainebleau which the Nazis were using to direct their U-boat campaign, and was so powerful that the U-boats could pick up its messages without having to surface. He was to be accompanied by 'The Twins' (SOE agents Alfred and Henry Newton) but, just as they were about to undertake the mission, a failed attempt by a French agent resulted in significantly increased security and Churchill’s mission was called off.

=== Third mission ===
His third mission was to organise and coordinate the SOE F Section "Spindle" Network in Cannes which directed the delivery of supplies to support the CARTE Organisation run by André Girard.

On 27 August 1942, he was parachuted near Montpellier and went to Cannes where he learned that Francis Basin had just been arrested. Churchill planned to rescue him when he was being transferred by train to Lyon but this attempt was called off, apparently at Basin’s request.

Among his couriers was Odette Sansom «Lise», with whom he was to develop a close relationship and subsequently marry after the war. Adolphe Rabinovitch «Arnaud» was his wireless operator. Churchill arranged an arms drop for General de Lattre de Tassigny, Commander of one of the sole French Divisions still in existence, based in Montpellier, and another for the Maquis des Glières, who operated near Lake Annecy in Haute-Savoie.

Several attempts were made to fly him back to the UK to report on his activities. The first attempt was for a Hudson bomber to land at Vinon near Aix-en-Provence to collect Churchill, Giraud and five French generals, however the terrain had not been surveyed properly by the French resistance and the runway proved inadequate, so Churchill aborted the landing.

Returning to Cannes, Churchill was informed that two police inspectors had called at his accommodation searching for him, and he had to change lodgings immediately. On 8 November 1942 Hitler ordered the occupation of Vichy France and as a result of increased security activities in Cannes, Giraud moved his CARTE operations to Arles.

In November 1942, a CARTE courier, André Marsac, was arrested in Paris by Abwehr intelligence officer Hugo Bleicher and his interrogation in Fresnes prison led to the arrest of another CARTE member, Roger Bardet. Bardet was interrogated in Fresnes, became a double agent, and released. From information provided by Marsac and Bardet, Bleicher came to know all about the SPINDLE network, including the names of Churchill and Sansom, and believed Marsac’s false claim that Churchill was related to Winston Churchill.

A second attempt from Arles in late December 1942 was unsuccessful due to the heavy presence of German soldiers.

In January 1943, Girard was dismissed as head of the CARTE Organisation, and Henri Frager «Paul» and André Marsac «End» were made Joint Commanders. The third attempt was on a small abandoned airfield near Tournus between Mâcon and Chalon-sur-Saône in January 1943 to collect Churchill and take Frager to London to clear up the confusion over the CARTE question and have a definite ruling on the matter from HQ. The Germans had obstructed the planned landing strip to prevent a landing and these obstacles had to be cleared quickly. The Hudson bomber collected 10 men, but it turned out that some of De Gaulle’s agents had planned this landing at the same time, and Churchill and Frager were not collected.

Churchill and Sansom returned to Cannes for the last time, and he arranged a further attempt for a Lysander to land near Périgueux. This entailed a journey of over 800 kilometres through German occupied France, changing trains at Marseille and Toulouse. The landing had to be aborted when it was realised that the Germans were lying in wait, and Churchill, Frager, Sansom and the others escaped on foot, narrowly missing capture.

Churchill and Sampson left Périgueux by train for Toulouse where they were provided accommodation in a safe house and informed that all passengers on an earlier train from Périgueux had been met by the Gestapo and questioned, and that his flat in Cannes has been raided and people arrested. He decided it was too dangerous to remain in Cannes and relocated the SPINDLE network to Saint-Jorioz on Lake Annecy in Haute-Savoie, and changed his cover name.

A further attempt was made to land a Lysander at Tournus north of Lyon, but the aircraft did not arrive. On 22/23 March 1943, a Lysander piloted by Hugh Verity landed at Estrées-Saint-Denis near Compiègne exfiltrated Churchill and Frager, while bringing Francis Cammaerts «Roger» to take over the SPINDLE network in his absence.

=== Fourth infiltration ===
On 14/15 April 1943, he returned by parachute onto the mountains above Saint-Jorioz where he was met by Sansom, and they stayed in the Hotel de la Poste in Saint-Jorioz.

=== Arrest and imprisonment ===
Later that morning Bleicher arrested Churchill and Sansom in their hotel. He claimed he was related to Winston Churchill and that they were a married couple to make themselves seem more valuable prisoners and less likely to be executed as spies.

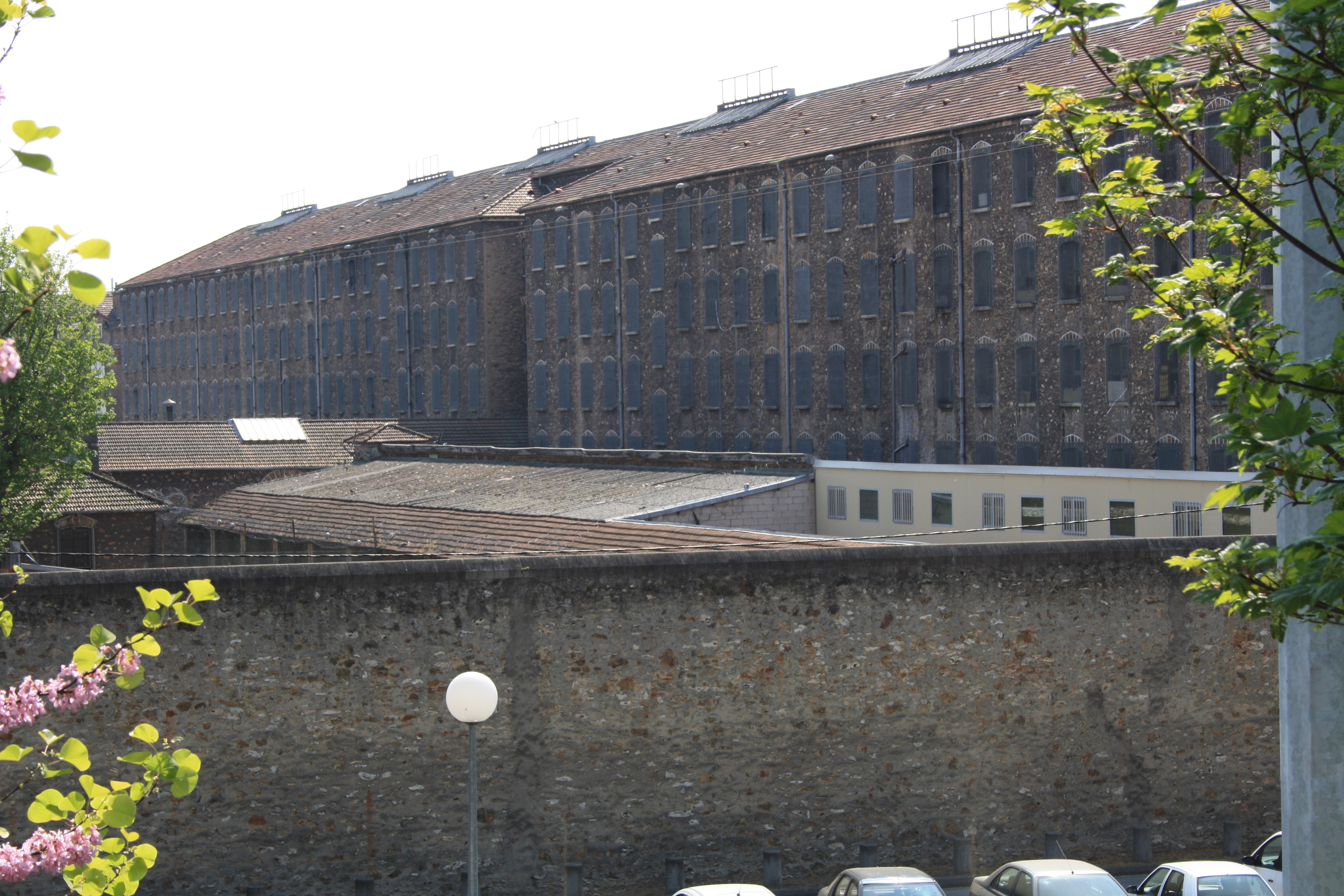
Fresnes Prison

They were sent to Fresnes Prison and then different concentration camps where each was sentenced to death, but both escaped execution, unlike the majority of captured SOE agents. Odette endured terrible torture but revealed nothing to her captors.

Churchill was initially taken under Italian custody to the barracks in Annecy, where he was badly beaten after an unsuccessful escape attempt during which he assaulted an Italian guard. He was then transferred to German custody and moved to Fresnes Prison near Paris where he was questioned by Bleicher, who believed Marsac’s false claim that Churchill was a nephew of the British Prime Minister and discussed a prisoner swap with Rudolf Hess.

On 13 February 1944, he was transferred to Berlin for questioning, and on 2 May sent to Sonderlager “A” Sachsenhausen, where he was held in solitary confinement for 10½ months.

On 1 April 1945, he was moved by train to Flossenbürg, 50 miles south-east of Bayreuth, where he was held for 3–4 days before being taken by truck on a 30-hour trip to Dachau where, rather than being taken to the notorious concentration camp, he was lodged in a former brothel along with 30 other officers. As an officer he was given better treatment than most of the 22,000 inmates of Flossenbürg, who were forcibly evacuated on the 200 km death march to Dachau concentration camp, during which one third died. The next day, as the Americans were approaching Dachau, he and 30 other officers were taken by bus to Innsbruck, where he was held in the Straflager. They were joined by over 100 other Prominenten (notable prisoners), including former heads of state and high-ranking military personnel.

On 24 April, Churchill was taken from Dachau over the Brenner Pass to Villabassa (Niederdorf in the Tyrol), together with many other prominent concentration camp inmates from different countries, where the SS left the prisoners behind as American forces were approaching.

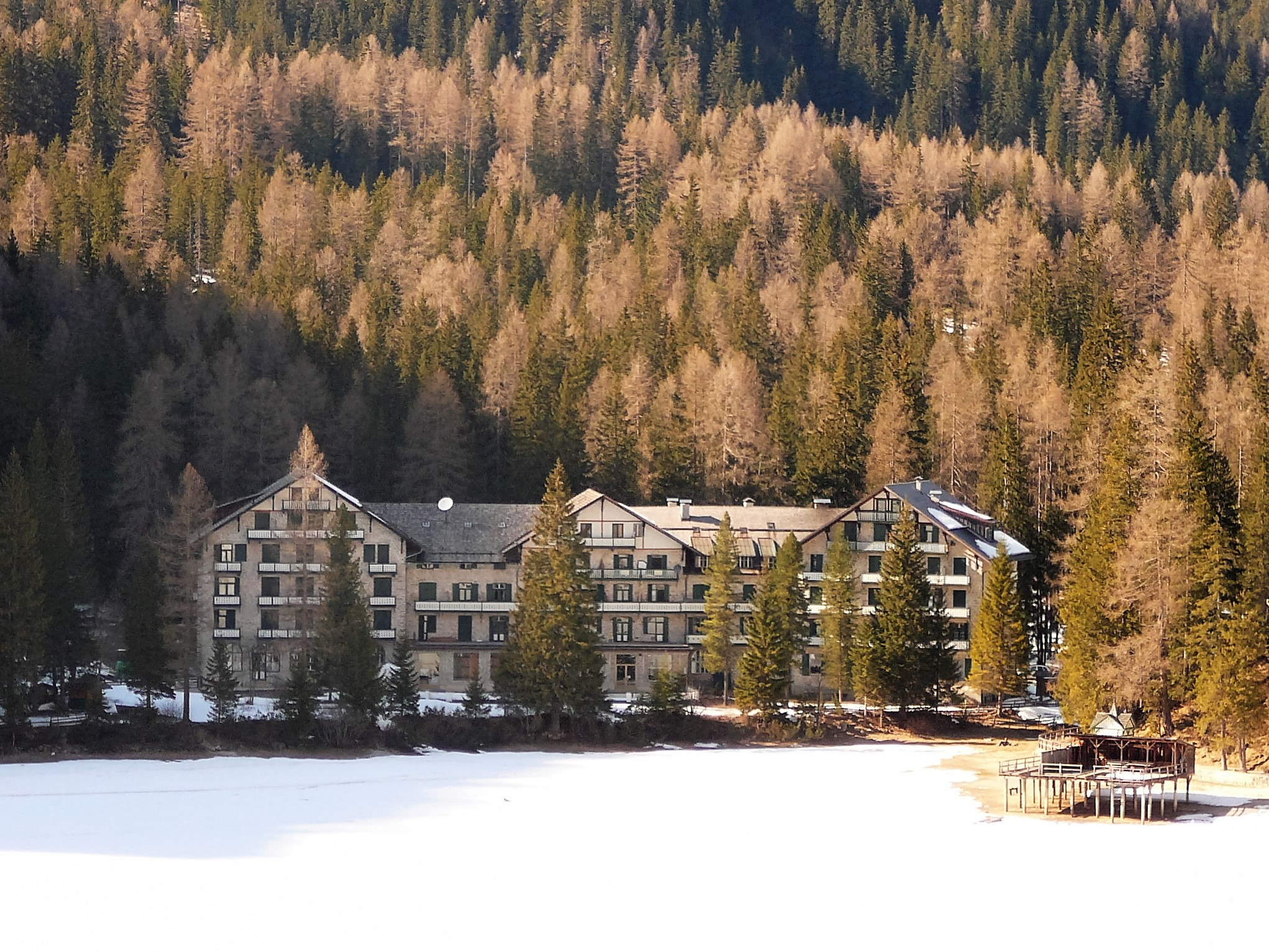
Hotel Pragser Wildsee

On 27 April, he was taken 15 miles to the south to Pragser Wildsee, where on 4 May he was liberated by the Fifth United States Army. He was taken to Naples for debriefing by officers from the Crimes Investigations Departments and testified against his former captors, and on 12 May was flown back to England in the private plane of Air Marshal Garrow.

This officer carried out four clandestine missions into France between the end of 1941 and the spring of 1943. He was first landed by submarine in the south of France in December 1941 with the mission of contacting the principal organisers in the unoccupied zone, to bring them directives, remedy their various difficulties, improve communications and arrange help for arrested members of the organisation. This involved much travel and dangerous liaisons activity, but CHURCHILL carried out the mission with complete success and return to England in early February 1942.

His second mission was to organise the infiltration of a number of agents by sea into the South of France. Although this involved a short stay in France, it was nevertheless a delicate and hazardous task. It was mainly due to CHURCHILL's courage and resourcefulness that the operation was successfully carried out.

In April 1942, he was parachuted into France as chief liaison officer to a large resistance group in the south. He worked here for several months organising parachute dropping operations and the reception of agents by sea on the Mediterranean coast. His operations were always well organised and he took great personal risks to ensure the safe disposal of infiltrated agents.

In March 1943, Capt. Churchill paid a short visit to England for consultation. Two months after his return to France in May 1943, he was arrested. By that time, he had decentralised the organisation to such an extent that his work could be continued by others. He was released by Allied troops in Germany in May 1945.

Capt. Churchill worked tirelessly and unselfishly over a long period in very trying conditions, showing outstanding courage, leadership and organising ability, which earned him the respect and admiration of all who came in contact with him. It is strongly recommended that he is appointed a Companion in the Distinguished Service Order.

— Maj. Gen. C. McV. Gubbins – Recommendation for DSO

=== Post-war ===
Peter Churchill and Odette Sansom married in 1947. In the 1950 film Odette, which recounted their wartime exploits, Anna Neagle played the title role and Churchill was played by Trevor Howard.

He wrote three books about his exploits in SOE, and a further fictitious book about the French resistance movement in Haute Savoie.

Some years after the war Peter and Odette Churchill met up with Hugo Bleicher, after inviting him to the UK.

Peter and Odette divorced in 1956, and the following year he married Australian Irene Hoyle, a former model, in Nice. He continued to live in France after the war, settling in Le Rouret near Cannes, where he worked in real estate, and lived there until his death on 1 May 1972.

== Legacy ==
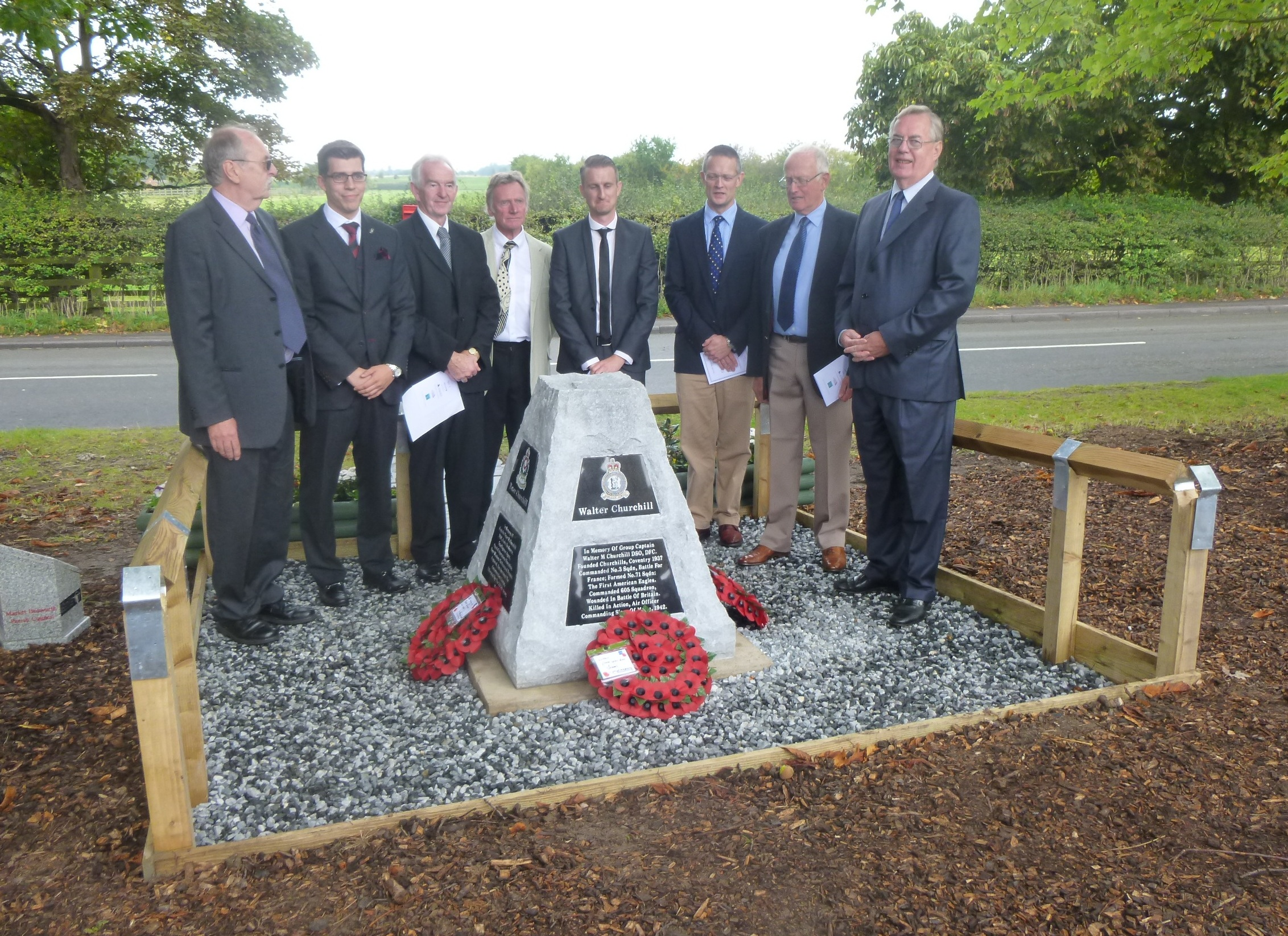
Memorial to the three Churchill Brothers

Peter's brother, Walter, relocated his engineering business, JJ Churchill, from Coventry to Market Bosworth during the war. After the Market Bosworth Historical Society became aware of the wartime gallantry of not just Walter, but also of his brothers Peter and Oliver, it decided to fund a Memorial Cairn. The granite Cairn is located in front of the JJ Churchill factory, and was unveiled in autumn 2015.

Three of the four sides commemorate each of the Churchill brothers, while the fourth side commemorates the factory’s relocation from Coventry to Market Bosworth and Walter landing his Hurricane in the field opposite while overseeing the factory’s move.

== Books by Peter Churchill ==
- Of Their Own Choice, Hodder and Stoughton, 1952
- Duel of Wits, Hodder and Stoughton, 1953
- The Spirit in the Cage, Hodder and Stoughton, 1954
- By Moonlight, Hale, 1958
- All About the French Riviera, Vista books, 1960
