= Roger Bardet =

WWII French double agent (1916–1972)

Roger Julien Bardet (14 March 1916 – 7 April 1972) was a member of the French resistance organisation known as CARTE, based in Cannes, organised by André Girard. He was betrayed by a fellow agent and became a double agent.

In November 1942 CARTE courier André Marsac was arrested in Paris by German intelligence officer ‘Colonel Henri’ Hugo Bleicher who put him in Fresnes prison, where he convinced Marsac that he was an anti-Nazi German officer and could help release him, but this would require the help of a fellow agent. Marsac wrote a letter to Roger Bardet asking him to visit him in prison to discuss his escape. Armed with this letter and another to Marsac's wife, Bleicher set off for Saint-Jorioz on the banks of Lake Annecy where Peter Churchill had relocated the SPINDLE network, to meet Mme Marsac and persuaded her to come to Paris. He also met Bardet and Odette Sansom «Lise».

London's response to Bardet's request for air transport for Marsac and ‘Colonel Henri’ was to refuse outright and insist that he immediately break off contact with Marsac and ‘Colonel Henri’, however Bardet ignored the orders and returned to Paris where he, along with a number of other agents, was arrested by Bleicher and placed in Fresnes prison. Bardet became a double agent and released from prison. He became second in command to Henri Frager in the DONKEYMAN network, resulting in Frager's arrest and compromise of the network.

There were strong suspicions in the SPINDLE network that Bardet had betrayed André Marsac, and Adolphe Rabinovitch «Arnauld» was only dissuaded by Sansom from shooting him out of hand.

After a series of casual daily talks in Marsac's cell, Bleicher knew just about all there was to know about the SPINDLE group in St Jorioz, including the names of Churchill and Sansom. In April 1943 he returned to Saint-Jorioz where he arrested them and transferred them to Fresnes prison, where they were interrogated before being transferred to concentration camps. Churchill and Sansom were condemned to death but survived, whereas the majority of captured SOE F Section agents were executed.

Bardet betrayed the INVENTOR network, leading to the arrests in October/November 1943 of its organiser Sidney Jones, wireless operator Marcel Clech, and courier Vera Leigh, all of whom were executed, and resulting in the collapse of the network.

Bardet also betrayed Henri Frager, another former Carte member who had been commissioned by the SOE as leader of its Donkeyman circuit, whom Bleicher arrested in July 1944, and Frager was subsequently executed.

He may have betrayed the PRUNUS network in Toulouse leading to the arrest of Maurice Pertschuk, organiser; Marcus Bloom, wireless operator; and several of their key colleagues, resulting in the collapse of the network.

Having obtained his liberty and sensing that Germany would lose the war, Bardet eventually rejoined the resistance movement. Bardet was captured by the Allies after the war and condemned to death as a traitor by a French court, but was subsequently reprieved and released.
