= Carte network =

The Carte network or Carte circuit or Carte organization was an early and illusory attempt at organizing French resistance to the occupation of France by Nazi Germany during the Second World War. The creator of Carte, André Girard, claimed to have "plans in hand for preparing first sabotage teams, then larger guerrilla groups, and finally a private army some 300,000 strong" to liberate France. Girard's army existed mainly on paper and in the minds of a community of artists, musicians, and students living on the French Riviera. Girard persuaded the United Kingdom's clandestine organization, the Special Operations Executive, (SOE) that his plan merited British help. Carte was eventually suppressed by the Germans and many of its members ended up in concentration camps or were executed.

== Carte and SOE ==
The Carte network was the brainchild of André Girard, an artist living in Antibes on the French Riviera in 1941. Girard took the code name Carte which also became the name of his resistance network. In April 1941, he persuaded Henri Frager, an architect, to be his second in command and the pair set about recruiting intellectuals, soldiers, and others to become members of the network. Girard envisioned the recruitment of an army from anti-Nazi officers and men serving in the army of Vichy France to rise up against the German occupiers of France. For SOE headquarters in London it seemed "that they had found what they were looking for; a ready-made secret army which only needed arms and orders before it was ready to co-operate in throwing the Germans out of France."

SOE agent Francis Basin made a first contact with Girard in late fall 1941 and agent Peter Churchill was sent to Antibes in January 1942 to assess Girard's claims and the viability of Carte. Based on the reports by Basin and Churchill, in July 1942 Nicolas Bodington, second in command of SOE's F section, landed in Vichy France. In September Bodington filed a report confirming his favourable opinion of the network. Maurice Buckmaster, leader of the French section of SOE, proposed an expansion of SOE to deal with Carte and approved a contribution of supplies and equipment. The potential of Carte was a "dominating influence" over the work of SOE's French section in 1942, work that would come to naught.

The official historian of the SOE, M.R.D. Foot said that Girard "combined an ingenious administrative talent with a total ignorance of security." The ignorance of security was soon demonstrated. Girard drew up in his Antibes apartment a list of more than 200 supporters or potential supporters of Carte. The list included their names, addresses, and other information. In November 1942, an assistant of Girard named André Marsac was carrying the list by train from Marseille to Paris to give it to SOE agent Francis Suttill. While Marsac slept on the train, an agent of Abwehr (German military intelligence) stole the briefcase which contained the list. The Germans did not immediately take action against Carte and the people on the list.

The danger to Carte and SOE in southern France increased when Germany occupied Vichy France in November 1942. Carte, however, fragmented prior to a German crackdown. Girard and his assistant Henri Frager quarreled, the final fracture between the two coming on January 2, 1943. SOE agent Peter Churchill had earlier arrived in southern France to evaluate the usefulness of the Carte network. He was impressed by the people he met but the disagreement between Girard and Frager made it necessary for SOE to choose between them. Churchill, having chosen Frager as preferable, took him to London in March 1943 to be briefed by SOE on his future role. After his arrival in France in March 1943, SOE agent Francis Cammaerts subsequently made a much more realistic appraisal of Carte. "What I found," said Cammaerts, "was musical comedy stuff: no concept of security whatsoever and wildly over-ambitious."

=== Downfall ===
Carte was doomed by its quixotic nature and the list of supporters the Germans had in their possession. German suppression of Carte began in March 1943 with a complicated plot. André Marsac, from whom the Carte list had been stolen by the Abwehr, was arrested near the Champs Élysées by Hugo Bleicher, a sergeant in the Abwehr, and incarcerated in Fresnes prison. Bleicher, posing as an anti-Nazi German colonel, told Marsac that he wished to defect, and the pair concocted an elaborate scheme involving the co-operation of Marsac's assistant Roger Bardet, who was persuaded by letter to visit Marsac in prison. The outcome of Bleicher's deception was the arrest on 16 April 1943 of Churchill and his courier, Odette Sansom. A bonus was provided by Marsac, who supplied Bleicher with the addresses of some twenty clandestine networks in Bordeaux, Strasbourg and Marseille.

Henri Frager had returned to France to assume leadership of the new SOE Donkeyman circuit built on the remnants of Carte. Bardet, having been persuaded to betray Frager, was allowed to 'escape' German control. Frager was taken in by the escape story. He also fell for Bardet's offer to provide new forged identity papers for the British SOE agents working with him, and allowed photographs of the agents to be supplied to Bardet for that purpose. One of the agents was Vera Leigh. The 'forged' papers were provided by the Germans. On 2 July 1944 Frager attended a rendezvous with Bleicher (again posing as the anti-Nazi colonel), and was arrested. The meeting had been arranged by Bardet. Having obtained his liberty and sensing that Germany would lose the war, Bardet eventually rejoined the resistance movement.

The Abwehr's acquisition of Girard's list in November 1942 would have further implications for other SOE agents not directly involved with Carte. Carte had given Francis Suttill, an SOE agent, a list of contacts which he used. He instructed his courier Andrée Borrel to contact two sisters, Geraldine and Madeleine Tambour in Paris. The sisters were known to several members of Suttill's Prosper network who used them to pass on letters and held meetings in their Paris apartment. The sisters were arrested by the Gestapo in April 1943 which was the beginning of the destruction of the Prosper network and the execution of Suttill, Borrel, Gilbert Norman, and other members of the Prosper network.

== Bibliography ==
- Flames in the Field, by Rita Kramer, first published in 1995 by Michael Joseph Ltd, London. ISBN 0-7181-3881-3
