= Ted Coppin =

British espionage agent

Ted Coppin MBE CdG (20 May 1915 – 23 April 1943) was a British agent of the Special Operations Executive during the Second World War.

== Biography ==
Edward Cyril Coppin was born in Essex on 20 May 1915.

He joined the Special Operations Executive, Section F, with the rank of Lieutenant.

On 11/12 June 1942 he landed by boat in France to join the DONKEYMAN network of Henri Frager in Marseille. He trained a sabotage group comprising a small but efficient team of railway workers, ensuring a satisfactory increase in the rate of accidents in marshalling yards and making good use of abrasive grease to cause damage.

Ten months after his arrival, he was arrested on 23 April 1943, with his courier "Gisele", and executed in captivity on 27 September 1943, aged 28.

== Recognition ==
=== Awards ===
- United Kingdom: MBE, Mentioned in Despatches.
- France: Croix de Guerre with a vermeil star.

=== Monuments ===
- He is honoured at The Valençay SOE Memorial, Indre, as one of the 104 agents of section F who lost their lives for France’s liberation.
- Brookwood Memorial, Surrey.
