= Hugh Verity =

British RAF fighter then SOE pilot (1918-2001)

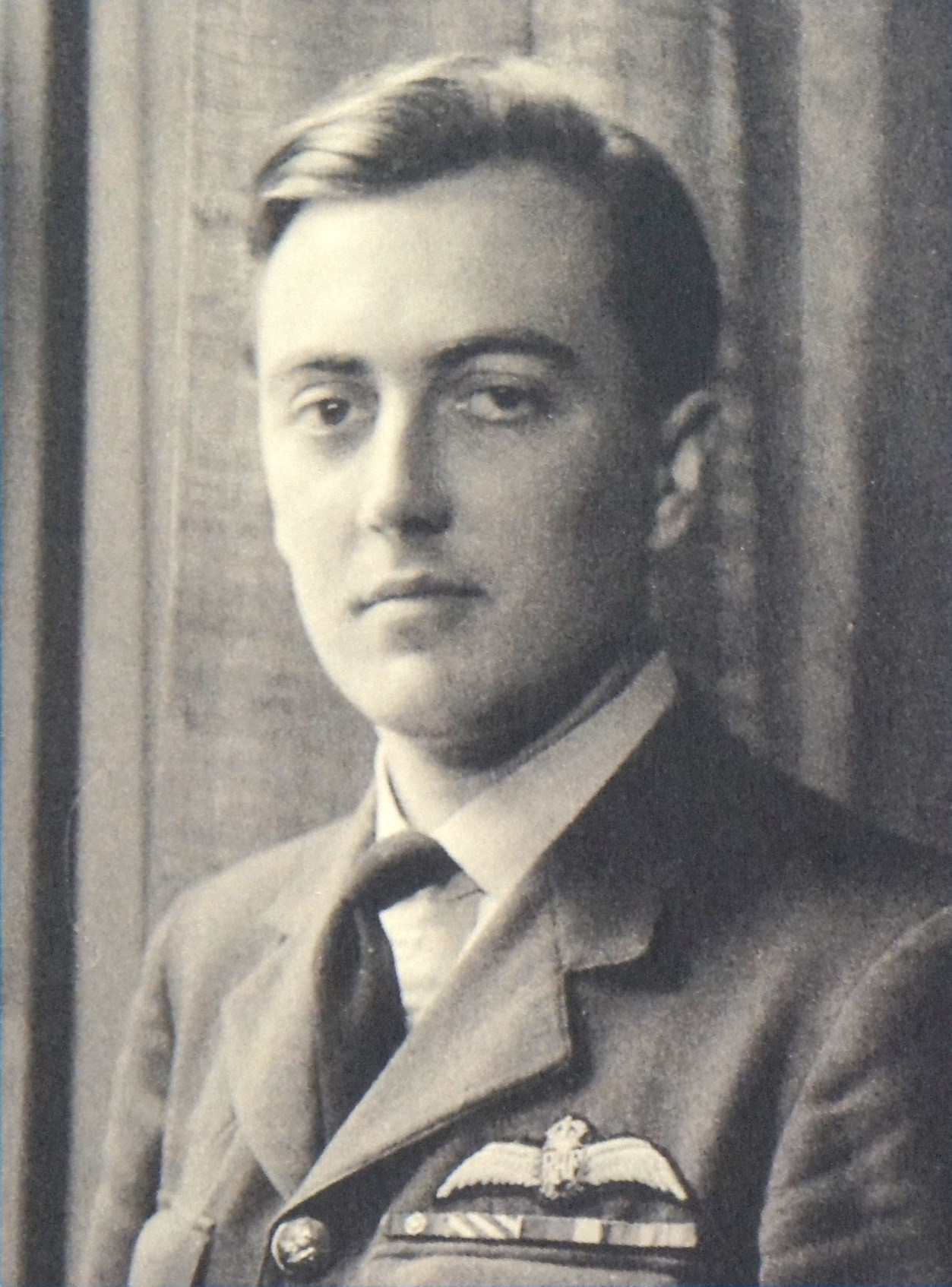
- Hugh Verity – a late-wartime or postwar photograph
- Born: 6 April 1918; The Rectory, Halfway Tree, Jamaica
- Died: 14 November 2001 (aged 83); Hounslow, England
- Spouse: Audrey (née Stokes)
- Military career
- Allegiance: United Kingdom
- Branch: Royal Air Force
- Service years: 1938–1965
- Rank: Group Captain
- Service number: 72507
- Units: No. 608 Squadron RAF; No. 252 Squadron RAF; No. 29 Squadron RAF; No. 161 Squadron RAF
- Commands: No. 541 Squadron RAF; No. 96 Squadron RAF
- Conflicts: Second World War
- Awards: Distinguished Service Order & Bar; Distinguished Flying Cross; Officer of the Legion of Honour (France); Croix de guerre (France)

Hugh Verity, DSO*, DFC (6 April 1918 – 14 November 2001) was a Royal Air Force fighter pilot and later a "special duties" squadron pilot working with the Special Operations Executive (SOE) during World War II. He landed many times at clandestine airfields in occupied France to insert and extract SOE agents. He was decorated for gallantry five times.

== Early life ==
Verity was born in Jamaica, the son of Dorothy and the Reverend George Beresford Verity. Pre-war, he was a frequent traveller by sea between England, Kingston, Jamaica, Bermuda and South America, where he spent some time and learned to speak Spanish. He was educated at Cheltenham College and Queen’s College, Oxford, where he joined Oxford University Air Squadron. After graduation, he taught in schools in Northern Ireland. He joined the Royal Air Force Volunteer Reserve and was commissioned as a pilot officer on 8 November 1938.

== Royal Air Force ==
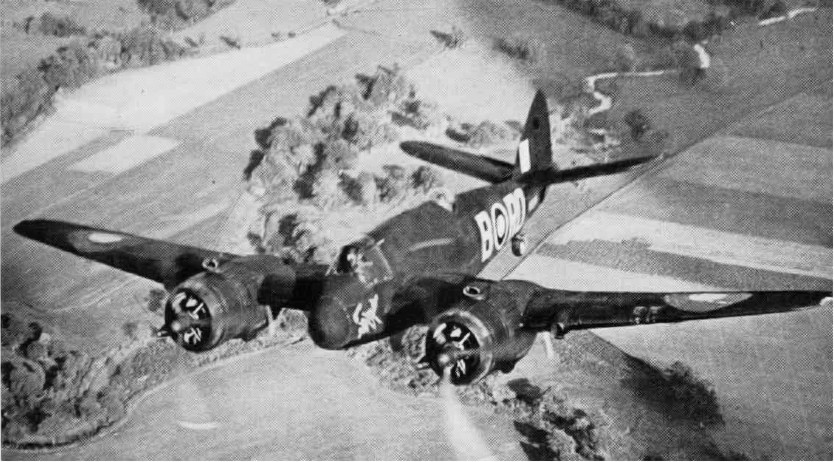
Beaufighter Mk IF (B-RO) of No. 29 Squadron.

On 8 May 1940 he was promoted flying officer, and in September 1940 was serving with No. 608 Squadron RAF flying Avro Ansons and Blackburn Bothas primarily in a general reconnaissance role. He joined No. 252 Squadron RAF in February 1941 as it re-equipped with Bristol Beaufighters and served on Malta. In late 1941 returning to England in very poor weather he force-landed in Ireland, at Leopardstown Racecourse. He was interned by the Irish, then escaped with help from British Military Intelligence MI9 about five weeks later. After his return to England, Verity wrote to the officer in charge of the camp from which he escaped, to thank him for "looking after us so fairly . . . I always found the Irish army extremely courteous and considerate and extremely impartial . . . I will be delighted to tell my friends over here how well we were fed and housed."

Promoted flight lieutenant on 6 November 1941 he served with No. 29 Squadron RAF at the end of 1941 flying night fighter operations before becoming Staff Officer (Night Operations) at No. 11 Group RAF and then Staff Officer (Night Operations) at HQ RAF Fighter Command.

== Special Operations ==
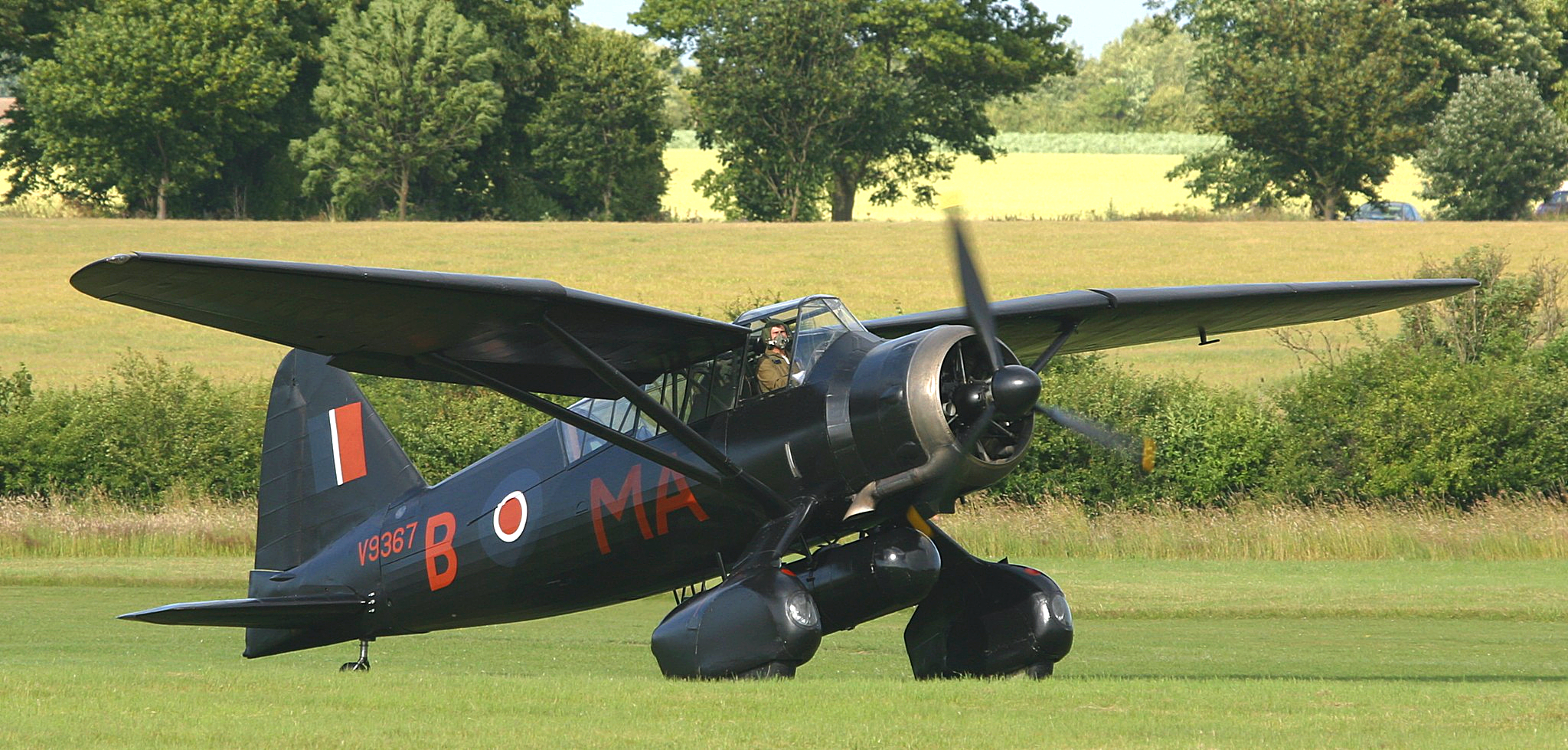
Westland Lysander Mk III (SD), the type used for special missions into occupied France during World War II.

Verity was promoted temporary squadron leader on 1 June 1942. In his role as Night Operations Officer he learned of the use of the Westland Lysander in the Royal Air Force Special Duty Service. He arranged an interview with P. Charles "Pick" Pickard, the new commanding officer of No. 161 Squadron RAF. In October 1942 he was given command of A-Flight, which used the Lysander aircraft for SOE missions into occupied France, inserting and extracting agents, resistance members and Allied prisoners. Verity noted he had to lead an eclectic group of pilots, all of whom were very capable, including Frank Rymills, Peter Vaughan-Fowler and Jim McCairns.

His first flight for SOE was on 23 December 1942 in a Lysander. The mission was to France, but he had to return empty handed due to heavy fog in the landing area. Verity undertook at least 29 and possibly as many as 36 night flights into France, perhaps the most of any RAF pilot. His role was to drop off and pick up resistance workers, SOE agents and other figures at secret locations inside France. Records from the Imperial War Museum indicate Verity flew Westland Lysander Mark IIIA (SD), (serial number "V9673" with squadron fuselage codes 'MA-J') bearing the nose-art of 'Jiminy Cricket' for 20 operations to occupied France while serving with No. 161 Squadron at RAF Tempsford, Bedfordshire.

Verity was instrumental in introducing the larger Lockheed Hudson into pick-up operations. With Pickard, he worked out the operating procedures that enabled this twin-engined aircraft to operate from French occupied fields, giving them the ability to carry in and bring out more people in one mission.

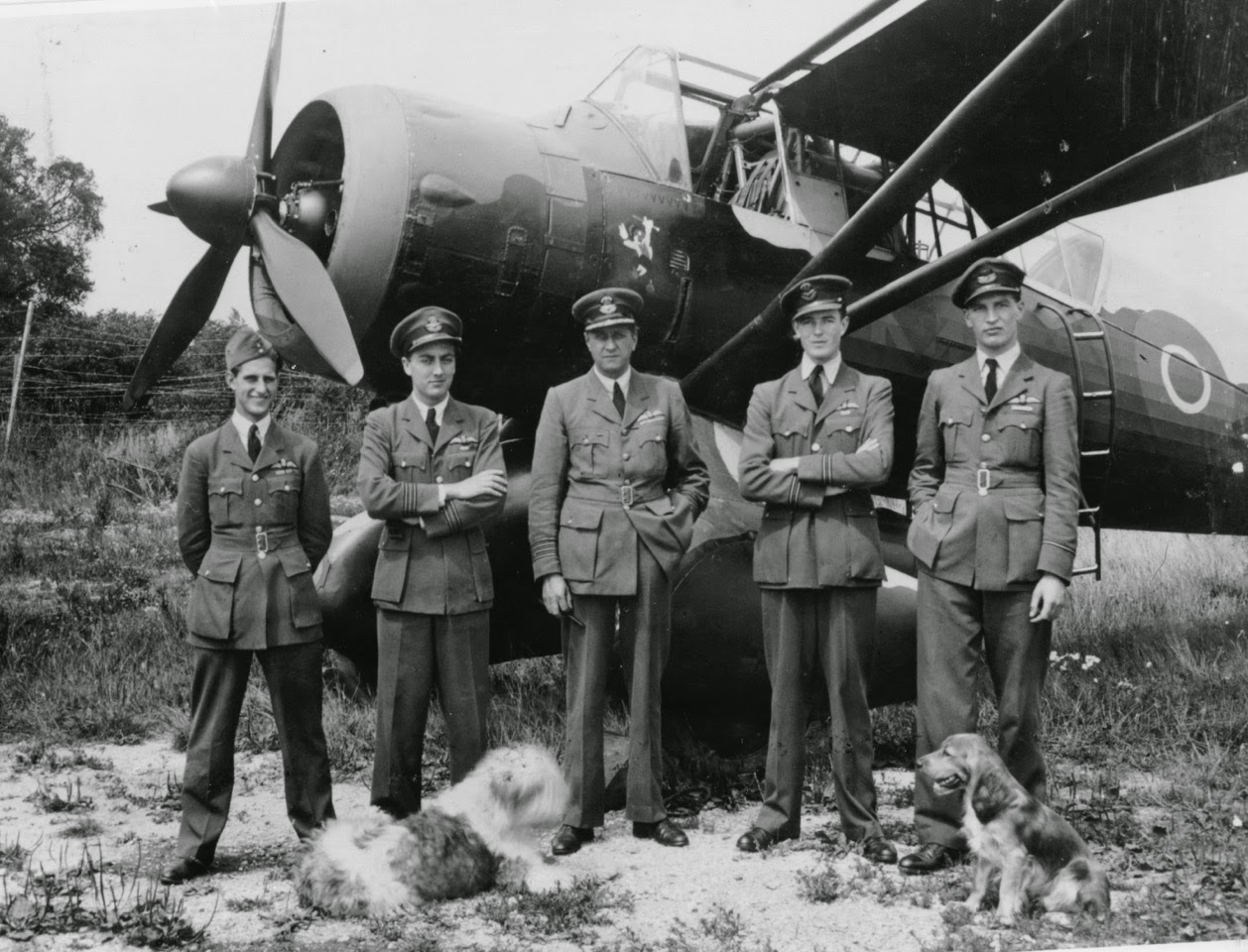
Jim McCairns, Hugh Verity, Percy Pickard, Peter Vaughan-Fowler and Bunny Rymills with Verity's Lysander in 1943.

On 25 May 1943 he was awarded the Distinguished Flying Cross, and on 31 August 1943 the Distinguished Service Order. His record of successful operations continued to grow. Most of his flights were in Lysanders, but he worked out with Pickard the use of the Hudson for the same purpose. Though larger and heavier, the Hudson could carry more passengers. Among his passengers were Jean Moulin, Nicolas Bodington, Peter Churchill, Henri Frager, Jean de Lattre de Tassigny and future president of France, François Mitterrand. His last special operation was on the night of 16–17 November 1943. On 14 January 1944 he was awarded a Bar the Distinguished Service Order, and promoted squadron leader on 14 March 1944.

Later in the war he performed the role of SOE air operations manager for western Europe and Scandinavia, coordinating the SOE requirement for air support with the available pilots and aircraft of primarily No. 138 Squadron RAF and No. 161 Squadron. In late 1944 Verity was commanding SOE air operations in south east Asia and following the end of hostilities served with the Recovery of Allied Prisoner-of-War and Internees Organisation.

== Postwar service ==
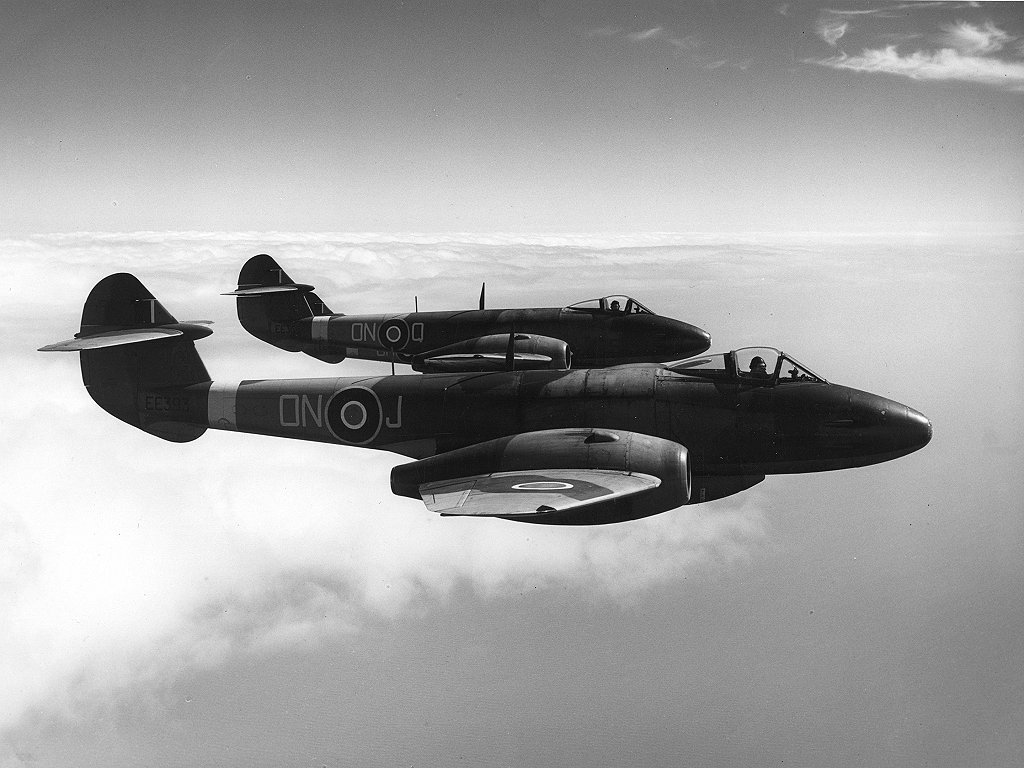
Gloster Meteor jet fighters

Verity was granted a permanent commission as squadron leader on 25 March 1947. Verity served on staff at the Army Staff College, Quetta until being invalided home with polio. From 1948 to 1949 he commanded No. 541 Squadron RAF flying the Supermarine Spitfire Mark XIX photo reconnaissance variant and then served as wing commander (weapons) at the Central Fighter Establishment 1949 to 1951. He was promoted full wing commander on 1 July 1951, serving at Joint Services Staff College until appointed wing commander (flying) at RAF Wahn from 1954 to 1955. Verity commanded No. 96 Squadron RAF flying Gloster Meteor jet night fighters in 1955 and was appointed group captain on 1 July 1958 ready for a series of postings as Staff Officer (Bomber Operations) at the Air Ministry, a posting to Turkey and commanding RAF Akrotiri in Cyprus and then Staff Officer (Special Duties) back at the Air Ministry. Verity requested retirement and was released from the service on 2 June 1965 to take up a position with the Printing and Publishing Industry Training Board. In 1978, Verity's history of all the RAF's secret landings in France, 1940–1944, was published as We Landed By Moonlight (Shepperton: Ian Allan Ltd, 1978). A revised edition appeared in 1995 (Airdata Pubns Ltd) and this was later updated (Manchester: Crecy Publishing, 2000, ISBN 0-947554-75-0).

== Awards ==
- Distinguished Service Order as squadron leader commanding "A-Flight" of No. 161 Squadron.
- Bar to the Distinguished Service Order as squadron leader commanding "A-Flight" of No. 161 Squadron.
- Distinguished Flying Cross as squadron leader commanding "A-Flight" of No. 161 Squadron.
- Officier de la Légion d'honneur (France) – 1946.
- Croix de Guerre avec palme (France).

== Notes ==
Verity flew a number of his SOE operations from RAF Tangmere where the museum has unveiled a bust of him.

Verity married on 27 August 1940 at All Saints' Church, Bisley, Audrey Geraldine Northcliffe Stokes, who was, as Verity had been, a student at Oxford. They had three daughters and two sons.

== Bibliography ==
- Hunt, Leslie (1992). Twenty-one Squadrons: the history of the Royal Auxiliary Air Force. London: Crecy. ISBN 0947554262.
- Verity, Hugh (2013). We Landed by Moonlight. Crecy Publishing. ISBN 9780947554750.
- M. R. D. Foot (2006). SOE in France. Routledge. ISBN 0415408008.
- Hearns, Doug (2011). The Distinguished Service Order 1920–2006. Uckfield: Naval & Military Press. ISBN 978-1781519639.
