= Mathilde Carré =

French resistance agent (1908–2007)

Carré at her 1949 trial

Mathilde Carré (30 June 1908 in Le Creusot, France – 30 May 2007), née Mathilde Lucie Bélard and known as "La Chatte" ("The Cat"), was a French Resistance agent during World War II who betrayed the Franco-Polish resistance organization, Interallie, and, as a double agent, was responsible for the arrest of dozens of Interallié operatives by the German occupiers of France. French Resistance leader Pierre de Vomécourt persuaded her to leave France with him and become an agent for the British. Upon arrival in Britain she was interrogated and imprisoned for the remainder of the war. After the war she was deported to France and convicted of treason and sentenced to death. The sentence was later reduced and she was released from prison in 1954.

== Early life ==
Carré was born in Le Creusot, Saône-et-Loire. In the 1930s she attended Sorbonne University and became a teacher. After her marriage, she moved to Algeria with her husband, Maurice Carré, who was later killed in World War II, during the Italian campaign.

== World War II ==
Carré returned to France, worked as a nurse and witnessed her country fall to the Germans. In 1940, she met Polish Air Force Captain Roman Czerniawski, whose cryptonym was "Walenty" to the Poles and "Armand" or "Victor" to the French. Carré, who had contacts with the Vichy Second Bureau, joined the headquarters section of his Franco-Polish Interallié network, a Franco/Polish espionage network based in Paris under the cryptonym "Victoire" (as all of the headquarters section staff had "V" initial names in a network that named its agents and their sectors or areas of coverage for given names grouped by the letters of the alphabet), but she was nicknamed La Chatte, ("The She-cat") for her feline predatory and stealthy propensities.

In October 1941, the Interallié had come to the attention of the Germans and Abwehr's Sergeant Hugo Bleicher was tasked with infiltrating the network. A captured agent gave Bleicher, names and addresses of Interallié members. In November, twenty-one members of Interallié were arrested by the Abwehr in Cherbourg and on 17 November the leaders, including Czerniawski and Carré, were arrested in Paris. After her arrest, according to Bleicher, Carré immediately gave him the names of everyone in Interallié. The information she provided enabled the Germans to destroy Interallié. She was released a day later and subsequently lived with Bleicher. She accompanied the Germans on raids to arrest Interallié agents. As a German double agent she continued to use the codename Victoire. The Germans also captured four radio transmitters which would be used to send false messages to SOE in London. Interallié was destroyed.

Pierre de Vomécourt, an agent in France of the Special Operations Executive (SOE) of Great Britain, had no wireless operator, and no means of communicating with SOE headquarters in London. He needed money as he had financed nearly all the expenses of his activities from his own pocket. Through an attorney in Paris, he was introduced on 26 December 1942 to Carré. Carré introduced Bleicher to Vomécourt as "Jean Castell," a Belgian resistance leader. What neither SOE headquarters nor Vomécourt knew was that Interallié was "burned" and that Carré was working for the German intelligence agency, the Abwehr. She said she had access to a wireless (one of those captured by the Germans) and could arrange for the transmittal of messages from Vomécourt to London. He was initially suspicious and tested her by having her send a message to London asking SOE for money. Two days later SOE responded and Carré told him a British agent would give him the money in Vichy. Vomécourt went to Vichy and received the money. SOE headquarters had been working with Interallié so it accepted the message sent to them by the Germans as genuine.

Despite SOE's confidence in Interallié, Vomécourt was still suspicious of Carré and in January 1942, his suspicions were heightened. He asked her to procure forged identity cards and she complied quickly, too quickly in his opinion and the cards were too good. Challenged, she admitted she was working for the Germans. Vomécourt then hatched a plan for Carré to persuade the Germans that she should go to SOE headquarters in London with him. Carré said she persuaded Bleicher and the Germans that she could return to France with valuable information about SOE. The Abwehr accepted her story and in early February, sent a message to London, supposedly from Vomécourt, requesting immediate evacuation from France of Vomécourt and Carré, saying their lives were in danger. After many misadventures, the two reached England via a British naval vessel on 27 February. This was the end of Carré's career as a double and triple agent. She was interrogated and imprisoned for the remainder of the war.

== Postwar ==
After the war, Carré was deported to France where she faced charges for treason. At the trial, which started on 3 January 1949, the prosecution read from her diary: "What I wanted most was a good meal, a man, and, once more, Mozart's Requiem." She was sentenced to death on 7 January 1949. Three months later, the sentence was commuted to life imprisonment and later further reduced. Carré was released in September 1954. She published an account of her life in J'ai été "La Chatte" (1959; revised in 1975 as On m'appelait la Chatte ["I Was Called the Cat"]). She died in Paris at the age of 98.

== Sources ==
- Jacques Baumel, Résister (mentions the betrayal )
- Macintyre, Ben (2012). Double Cross: The True Story of The D-Day Spies. London: Bloomsbury. ISBN 978-1408819906.
- Young, Gordon (1957). The Cat with Two Faces. Putnam. Based on extensive interviews London and Paris.
- Paine, Lauran (1976). Mathilde Carré: Double Agent. London: Hale; ISBN 978-0-7091-5511-9.
- Perrin, Nigel (2026). The Spy Who Betrayed: The Treachery of Mathilde Carré, Codenamed The Cat. Barnsley: Pen and Sword; ISBN 978-1-0361-4455-5.
