= Henri Frager =

French Resistance (1897-1944)

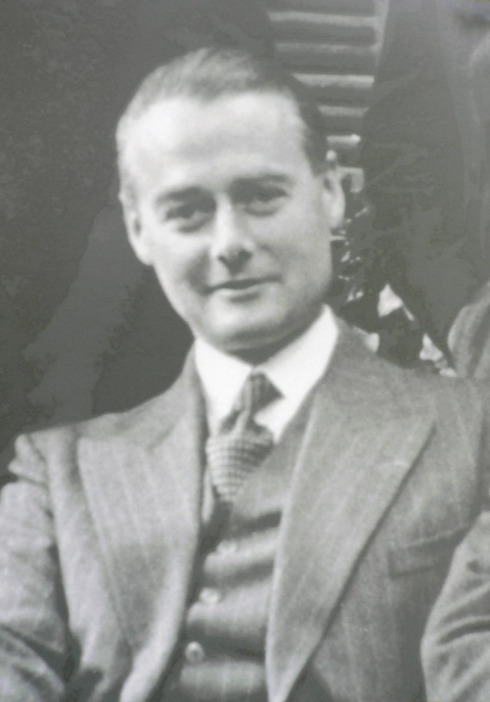
- Henri Frager in around 1935
- Born: 3 March 1897; Paris, France
- Died: 5 October 1944 (aged 47); Buchenwald concentration camp, Nazi Germany
- Occupation(s): Architect, French Resistance fighter

Henri Jacques Paul Frager (3 March 1897 – 5 October 1944) was a member of the French Resistance during World War II . He was second in command of the CARTE network (under André Girard), then head of the SOE (F section) network DONKEYMAN, rising to the rank of major within SOE. SOE was a secret British organization. Its objectives were to conduct espionage, sabotage, and reconnaissance in occupied Europe and Asia against the Axis powers, especially Nazi Germany. SOE agents in France allied themselves with resistance groups and supplied them with weapons and equipment parachuted in from Britain. In 1944, Frager was betrayed to the Germans, deported and executed.

== Early life ==
Henri Jacques Paul Frager was born in France on 3 March 1897, the son of Alphonse Jean Frager and Eugénie Louis Adolpine Frager, née Sauvier. He married the Russian-born Louba Frager and worked as an architect in Nice in civil life. On 25 November 1940 he dined with André Girard in a restaurant in Antibes. Girard wanted to develop a network to resist the occupation and influence of Nazi Germany, whereas Frager was then preparing to get to London via Algeria. He reached Algeria in December that year but, after several failed attempts to get from there to London, returned to Antibes in April 1941 and got back in contact with Girard, who recruited him into CARTE as his second in command under the codename Louba. With André Gillois and Colonel Vautrin, Girard and Frager recruited others for the growing network, and on 19 September 1941 Girard had his first meeting with an SOE agent, Francis Basin (codename Olive).

== Wartime activities ==
Exploring the possibilities for CARTE–SOE cooperation, SOE summoned Girard or any other officer of CARTE to come to London. Not wanting to go himself, Girard sent Frager and, on 30 June 1942, the Polish trawler Tarana took on Frager and brought him to Gibraltar, from where he flew to England by plane. In London that July, at Orchard Court, he met SOE's chiefs (Maurice Buckmaster, Nicholas Bodington, and probably Charles Hambro and Colin Gubbins). In Girard's name, Frager set out CARTE's needs (means of communication, arms, etc.). Wanting to know more, SOE sent him back to France with Bodington (codename Jean-Paul or PROFESSOR) to study the possibilities of cooperation, clarify the confused situation in the Lyon region and organised possible parachute drop-zones (SPRUCE). They were landed at Cap d'Antibes on the night of 29/30 July 1942 from the boat Seadog, with agents Harry Despaigne (MAGNOLIA) and Yvonne Rudellat (SOAPTREE), and on 12 September Bodington returned to England to make a highly favourable report on CARTE.

In November 1942, however, major disagreements broke out between Girard and Frager. The Germans having occupied the previously unoccupied zone of France, SOE wanted to review its plans with CARTE and demanded in a message on 12 November (received via Adolphe Rabinovitch, radio operator of the SPINDLE network) that Girard return to London. Several pick-up attempts that December failed and Frager prepared a report criticising Girard, to be transmitted to London, but Girard found out and also noted the good relations between Frager and Peter Churchill. In January–February 1943, Girard put off his departure for London indefinitely, before finally being picked up by a Hudson on the night of 21/22 February. Frager and Churchill were picked up by Lysander on the night of 23/24 March (landing at Estrées-Saint-Denis near Compiègne, piloted by Hugh Verity, flying in Francis Cammaerts and Georges Duboudin) and joined Girard in London. However, Girard refused to meet them and SOE distanced itself from Girard, opposing his return to France and warning Frager that he would have to lead what remained of the CARTE network against Hugo Bleicher (known as "colonel Henri") .

On the night of 14/15 April 1943 Frager was returned to France by Lysander (BRONCHITE drop zone, near Tours) and welcomed back by Henri Déricourt (GILBERT). He flew to London again on 20/21 October 1943 (in a Hudson, from the ACHILLE landing strip near Angers), but his pick-up had been organised by Déricourt, now under surveillance by the Sicherheitsdienst (SD), the German intelligence agency.. An altercation occurred before this between Frager and Déricourt over breakfast in a café facing Angers' train station. Frager had brought along his substitute and friend, Roger Bardet (in fact released from prison by Bleicher in exchange for Bardet feeding him information, a promise Bardet seems to have kept), to assist in his departure for London, but Déricourt forbade him from doing so. Frager also believed Déricourt to be a Gestapo agent and Déricourt suspected that Frager thought as much. Hugo Bleicher wrote in his book of his recruitment of Roger Bardet as V-Mann, and how Bardet had got into Frager's good books by revealing to him that Déricourt was a double agent working for Kieffer. There was no sympathy between Bleicher (and the Abwehr) and Josef Kieffer (of the SD). Hugh Verity gives Bleicher's account thus:

Paul (Frager) once more took the plane to London. He hoped to return about 15 days later. His visit was facilitated by Gilbert, who once more enjoyed the British's confidence and had become head of all personnel on the ground for secret flights and landings by SOE's French section. This made it hard for Paul to accept Gilbert as the organisor of his visit. On this occasion there was an argument between them that Roger told me about. Roger had accompanied Paul to the secret landing strip. They had scarcely arrived when Gilbert told Roger to accompany Paul to London, telling him that the order came from F section in London. He opposed this order, and was embarked on the plane by force. Ignorant of all this, Paul also had his suspicions. I suppose Gilbert, who came into [SD leader] Kieffer's office daily and knew the SD officers well, had been informed by them of Roger's true role and he thus wanted to dispose of him by sending him to London with a denunciation on his head. If Gilbert had got there, Paul's position would have been shaken. There was a serious altercation between Paul and Gilbert. Only Paul's determination, threatening to use his pistol, prevented Roger from being kidnapped and transferred to London by force.

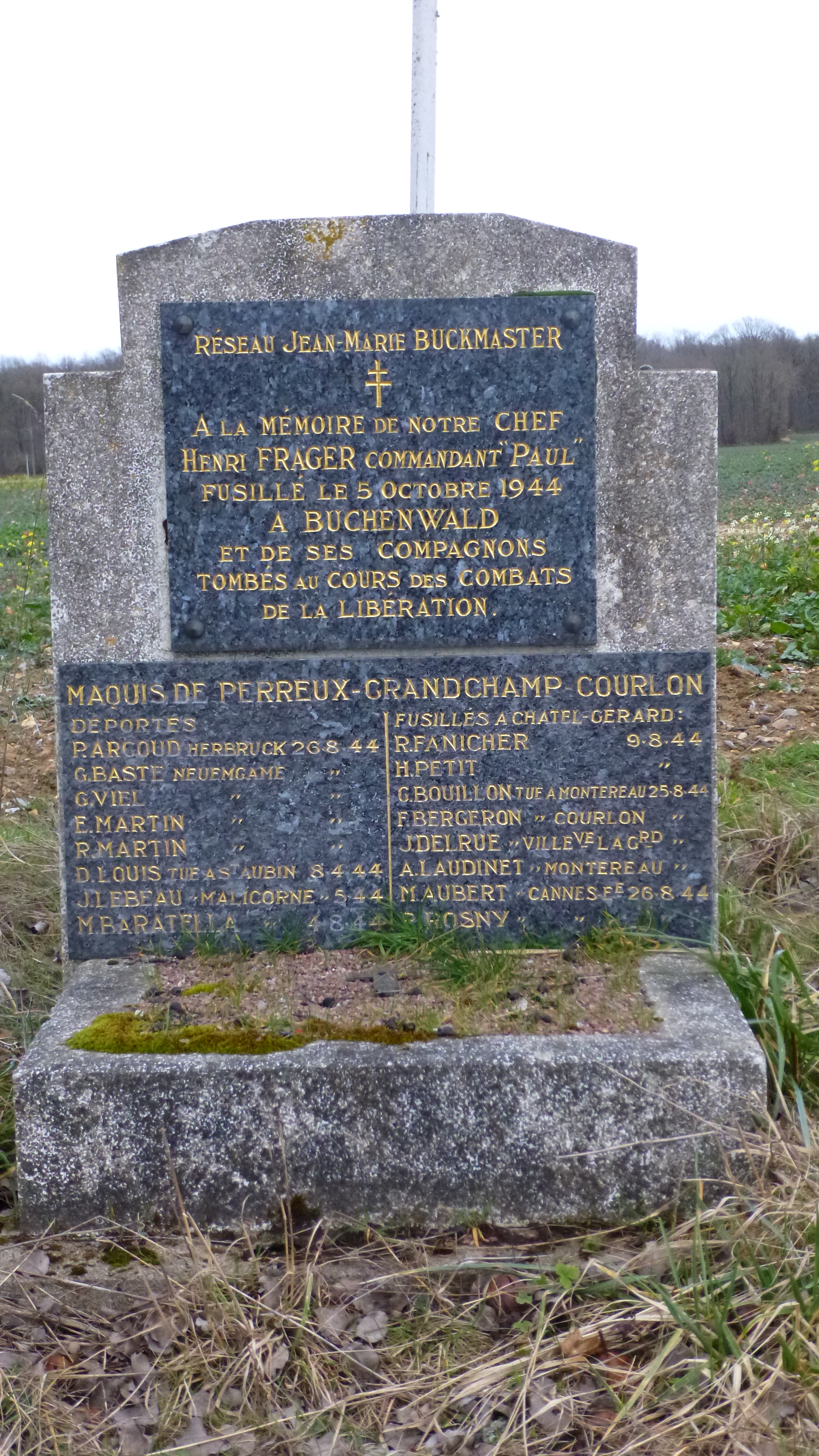
Memorial monument

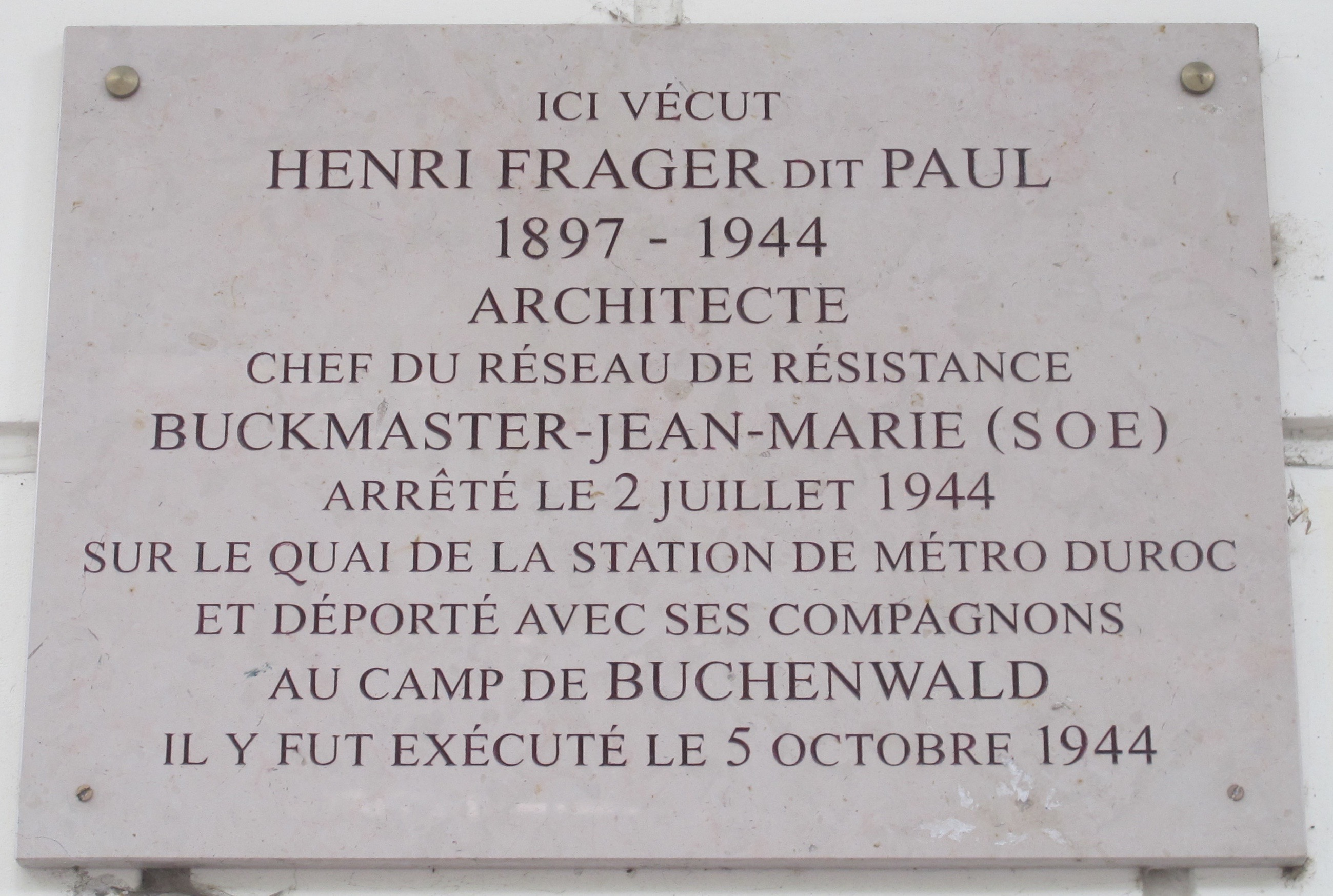
Henri Frager plaque in Boulevard du Montparnasse, Paris

On 29 February 1944 Frager was returned to France at Beg-an-Fry near Morlaix, under the codename Jean-Marie. He was sent as head of the DONKEYMAN network, with orders to develop Resistance groups in the Yonne and on the Côte d'Azur. His networks developed normally, one under Bardet and the other under Kieffer (Kiki). A group headed by Frager sabotaged the cellophane factory at Mantes, and reports and photographs of its missions were sent to London. Between June and August 1944, Frager's groups were supplied by 25 parachute drops, but Frager was betrayed by Bardet and arrested on 3 August 1944 and handed over to Bleicher on 8 August 1944. Deported to Buchenwald concentration camp, he was executed on 5 October that year.

== Recognition ==
=== Distinction ===
- UK : Mentioned in Despatches,
- France : Médaille de la Résistance (rosette).

=== Monuments ===
- As one of the 104 agents of SOE's F section F to die for France, Henri Frager is mentioned on the memorial at Valençay (Indre).
- Brookwood Memorial, Surrey, panel 21, column 3.

== Sources and external links ==
- Thomas Rabino, Le Réseau Carte, Perrin, 2008.
- Michael Richard Daniell Foot, SOE in France. An account of the Work of the British Special Operations Executive in France, 1940-1944, London, Her Majesty's Stationery Office, 1966, 1968; Whitehall History Publishing, in association with Frank Cass, 2004. Ce livre présente la version officielle britannique de l'histoire du SOE en France. Une référence essentielle sur le sujet du SOE en France.
- François Marcot (dir.), Dictionnaire historique de la Résistance, coll. Bouquins, Robert Laffont, 2006, ISBN 2-221-09997-4. Article "Vomécourt, Philippe de Crevoisier de" signé Michael R. D. Foot, pages 548-549.
- Hugh Verity, Nous atterrissions de nuit..., préface de Jacques Mallet, 5eme édition française, Éditions Vario, 2004.
- Sir Brooks Richards, Secret flotillas, 1996
