= Hugo Bleicher =

German WW2 Abwehr sergeant (1899–1982)

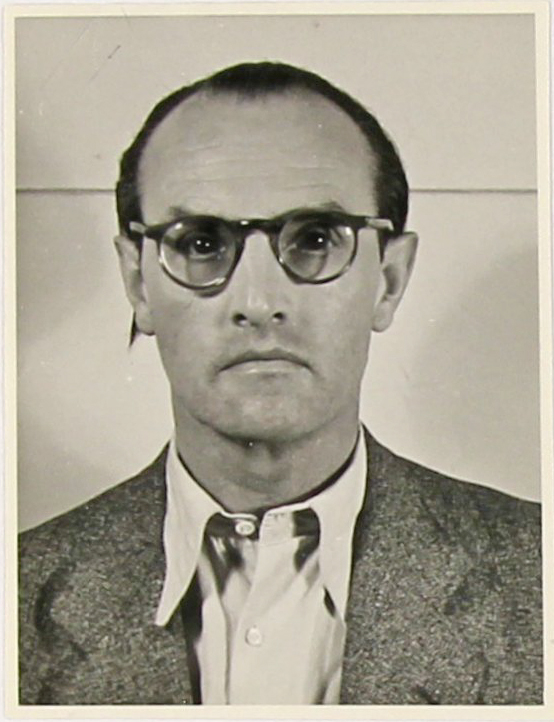
Hugo Bleicher

Hugo Bleicher (9 August 1899 – August 1982) was a sergeant in Nazi Germany's Abwehr (military intelligence agency) assigned to the Geheime Feldpolizei (secret field police) in German-occupied France during World War II. Described as a "super spy-catcher, Bleicher infiltrated resistance networks in France and was responsible for the arrest of more than one hundred French resisters and British Special Operations Executive (SOE) agents. Most of the SOE agents he captured were later executed. Bleicher was known by many aliases: Monsieur Jean, Jean Verbeck, Jean Castel, Colonel Henri, and Colonel Heinrich."

== Early life ==
Hugo Ernst Bleicher was born in Tettnang, Germany, on 9 August 1899. He was the son of a businessman. In World War I, he was drafted into the German army. He was captured by the British near the Somme River and interned as a prisoner of war. He escaped four times, but was recaptured each time. After the war he worked for an export company in Hamburg and from 1925 to 1928 in Morocco. On return to Hamburg, he lived the normal life of a businessman, marrying in 1929. The couple had a child in 1939. He was not involved in politics, but interested in languages.

== World War II ==
In August 1939, Bleicher responded to a newspaper advertisement asking for volunteers with language skills. Bleicher spoke fluent French and passable Spanish and English. He volunteered for what he thought was a civilian job, but in November 1939 he was called up to serve in the German military and sent for training as an undercover policeman. After the German conquest of France he was assigned by the Abwehr to Caen and later to Cherbourg.

=== Interallié ===
The resistance organization Interallié was founded by Polish soldiers stranded in France after its defeat and occupation by Nazi Germany in June 1940. Roman Czerniawski was the leader. A French woman, Mathilde Carré, called "the Cat" and "Lily," became prominent in the organization as Czerniawski's aide.

Pierre de Vomécourt was one of the earliest leaders of the French Resistance, but he lacked radio communications with the British SOE in London and needed money to continue building his resistance network. Unknown to Vomécourt and SOE, Interallié had been penetrated by Hugo Bleicher and the Abwehr. In October 1941, Bleicher had arrested an Interallié operative named Raoul Kiffer in Cherbourg. Threatened with being turned over to the Gestapo, Kiffer became an informant and the Abwehr began arresting Interallié members, including Carré who was working in Paris. Bleicher persuaded Carré to become a German agent by offering her money and luxurious accommodations. She became his mistress. In December 1941, Vomécourt contacted Interallié and Carré to use their radio link to SOE. Carré introduced Vomécourt to Bleicher who went by the alias of Jean Castell and portrayed himself as a Belgian resistance leader. Vomécourt, however, was wary and in January concluded that Carré was working for the Germans. Vomécourt confronted her and she confessed. He persuaded her to become a British agent and she persuaded Bleicher that she should accompany Vomécourt on a visit to London, the Germany theory being that she could gather information there about SOE and pass it along to the Germans after her return. However, in London Carré was interrogated and then imprisoned for the rest of the war.

Bleicher and the Abwehr had destroyed Interallié. Vomécourt returned to France on 1 April 1942. Bleicher captured one of his couriers and recognized Vomécourt's handwriting on a report the courier carried. Knowing Vomécourt was back in France, Bleicher found and arrested him on 24 April. Bleicher interrogated Vomécourt and the two of them had an amiable chat about both being deceived by Carré. Vomécourt and several of his associates spent the rest of World War II in a German prison camp, among the few SOE agents to survive being captured by the Germans. With the arrest of Vomécourt and the destruction of his Autogiro network, SOE had few resources left in France except for Virginia Hall in Lyon.

=== Carte and Spindle ===
With his success in destroying Interallié, the Abwehr gave Bleicher, still only a sergeant, considerable autonomy to do his job as he saw fit and to travel throughout France to search for and arrest SOE agents and French resisters and to break up resistance networks. Bleicher used a number of aliases such as Jean Castell, Monsieur Jean, and Colonel Henri. Bleicher did not rush into making arrests. He preferred to gather information that could be used to wipe out complete networks as compared to arresting a single agent or resister. On 21 March 1943, the Abwehr told Bleicher to arrest Frenchman André Marsac and use him, if possible, to infiltrate the remnants of the Carte network, now called Spindle.

Marsac was betrayed to the Germans by his lover, Helen James, an Irish woman. On 21 March 1943, Bleicher arrested Marsac at a Paris cafe and had him incarcerated in Fresnes Prison. Over the next few days Bleicher spent hours talking to Marsac. He portrayed himself as a German colonel who was dissatisfied with the Nazis and wanted to defect to England. He needed cooperation from Marsac or he would be forced to turn him over to the Gestapo. Marsac pledged his cooperation provided that Bleicher would help him escape. Together they hatched a plan to flee to England. Bleicher persuaded Marsac to write a letter to his second-in-command, Roger Bardet, introducing him as a potential defector who needed transportation to England.

Armed with a letter of introduction from Marsac and the blessing of Bardet, Bleicher traveled to the village of Saint-Jorioz. He met with SOE agent Odette Sansom. He asked her to arrange an evacuation flight for him and Marsac and said they would return on April 18 to depart France on the airplane. She wired SOE in London seeking advice and was told to break off all contact with "Colonel Henri" and go into hiding immediately. However, she and her organiser (leader) Peter Churchill did not move quickly enough. Not expecting Colonel Henri until 18 April, they stayed in Saint-Jorioz and were arrested by Bleicher on 16 April. Bardet, compromised by Bleicher, became a German agent and helped Bleicher destroy other SOE networks. Marsac and Bardet survived the war as did Sansom and Churchill.

Bardet helped Bleicher destroy the Inventor network, leading to the arrests in October/November 1943 of its organiser Sidney Jones, wireless operator Marcel Clech, and courier Vera Leigh, all of whom were executed, and resulting in the collapse of the network. Bardet also helped arrest Henri Frager, another former Carte member who had been commissioned by the SOE as leader of its Donkeyman circuit. Bleicher arrested Frager in July 1944 and Frager was subsequently executed.

== Postwar ==
In summer 1944, as the allied armies approached Paris, Bleicher requested that he and 10 agents be reassigned to Auxerre, which was further from the allied armies. His mistress, Suzanne Laurent, accompanied him to Auxerre. He was safe there for only a short time, fleeing with Laurent to Utrecht in the Netherlands. He refused to surrender when the Canadian army captured Utrecht and fled again to Amsterdam.

Hugo Bleicher, together with two of his French Abwehr agents Jean Rocquefort and Francois Barbier, was arrested in Amsterdam on 15 May 1945 by the Dutch NBS, who interrogated him for two weeks on his activities in the Netherlands before handing him over to the First Canadian Army, who interrogated him for a further period, also on his operations in the Netherlands, before handing him over to the British authorities, who transferred him on 16 June 1945 to the UK for longer term interrogation at Camp 020. He was handed over to the French government on 12 October 1945, and they also interrogated him. While imprisoned in Paris he met Bardet and told him he had planned to assassinate him on one occasion as Bardet knew too much against him. He visited the UK after the war, to testify against Abwehr colleague Robert Alesch during his trial in May 1948 as a double agent. He also visited Peter Churchill in France.

Bleicher's persuasiveness influenced even those who prosecuted him. He maintained that his job was to "arrest spies, imprison them, and then entertain them with Viennese waltzes." He denied mistreating prisoners. SOE agents captured by him said he was "extremely nice and polite" and his British and French counterparts respected him for his expertise. "At the end of the espionage intrigue," said author Larry Loftis, "the deft spy-catcher had once again proven his mastery of the game." According to author Sarah Helm, Bleicher was never charged with a crime. His imprisonment was for interrogation.

After being released from prison, Bleicher ran a tobacco shop in Tettnang. In 1954, he published his memoirs, Colonel Henri's story. He was decorated by the Abwehr with the War Merit Cross 1st Class for his services.

The character of Sergeant Gratz in the 1970 LWT television series Manhunt suggests that he is partly inspired by Bleicher.

== Bibliography ==
- Colonel Henri's story : the war memoirs of Hugo Bleicher former German secret agent. Hugo Ernst Bleicher, Ian Colvin, and Erich Borchers. London : William Kimber, 1954. OCLC Number: 220971979
