= By Moonlight =

1958 novel by Peter Churchill

- Author: Peter Churchill
- Publisher: Robert Hale
- Publication date: 1958

By Moonlight is a 1958 novel by British SOE officer Peter Churchill, DSO, Croix de Guerre. It is based on the true story of the Royal Air Force supplying arms and supplies to the Maquis des Glières, who were the first French resistance group to fight a pitched battle against the Germans in World War II. Churchill worked with the Maquis des Glières during his wartime activities in the French section of the Special Operations Executive.

== Synopsis ==
By Moonlight is a fictional book based on the true story of the RAF supplying arms and supplies to the Maquis des Glières, who were the first French resistance group to fight a pitched battle against the Germans. Their leader, Tom Morel, whittled down his numbers to 450 picked men of whom 50 were Spaniards, and made them all take an oath "Vivre libre ou mourir" (live free or die) to fight for their freedom. His motto is carved on the stone monument inside the Morette Cemetery on the Annecy-Thones road where 112 men, including their commanding officer, lie as a constant reminder of their epic battle in March 1944. Surrounded by 10,000 soldiers of a German Mountain Division armed with 88-millimetre guns and three-inch mortars, and battered in advance by two squadrons of Stuka Dive Bombers, this handful of men fought against 22 times their number. With the loss of only 12 men they killed 300 Germans before escaping over a snowbound pass. The other 100 graves in the cemetery are fighters were betrayed by the French Militia who recognised them later in the valley, and all were tortured before being executed.
