= André Marsac =

French Resistance

André Marsac was a member of the French resistance organisation known as the CARTE network or circuit, based in Cannes, organised by André Girard. Marsac acted as a courier.

In November 1942 Marsac was travelling on a train from Marseille to Paris carrying a briefcase containing a list prepared by Girard of 200 potential resistance fighters, with full descriptions of their identity and locations. His briefcase was stolen by an agent of the Abwehr while he dozed off, and the CARTE network was fatally weakened.

Marsac was arrested in Paris by German intelligence officer ‘Colonel Henri’ Hugo Bleicher who put him in Fresnes prison, where he convinced Marsac that he was an anti-Nazi German officer and could help release him, but this would require the help of a fellow agent. Marsac wrote a letter to Roger Bardet asking him to visit him in prison to discuss his escape. Armed with this letter and another to Marsac’s wife, Bleicher set off for Saint-Jorioz on the banks of Lake Annecy where Peter Churchill had relocated the SPINDLE network, to meet Mme Marsac and persuaded her to come to Paris. He also evaluated the rest of the resistance group, noting the inadequate security measures they adopted. On Bleicher’s return to Fresnes prison he was able to persuade Marsac to hand over a list of about 20 addresses of circuits in Bordeaux, Marseille, Strasbourg and elsewhere, which were previously completely unknown to the Germans.

London’s response to Bardet’s request for air transport for Marsac and ‘Colonel Henri’ was to refuse outright and insist that he immediately break off contact with Marsac and ‘Colonel Henri’, however Bardet ignored the orders and returned to Paris where he was arrested by Bleicher, along with a number of other agents.

After a series of casual daily talks in Marsac’s cell and information provided by Bardet, Bleicher knew just about all there was to know about the SPINDLE network, and in April 1943 he returned to Saint-Jorioz where he arrested Peter Churchill and Odette Sansom and subsequently transferred them to Fresnes prison, where they were subjected to brutal interrogation and torture before being transferred to concentration camps, but both were to survive the war, whereas the majority of captured SOE F Section agents were executed.
