= The Spirit in the Cage =

1954 book by Peter Churchill

- Title page for The Spirit in the Cage (1955)
- Author: Peter Churchill
- Genre: Memoir
- Publication date: 1954

The Spirit in the Cage is a book written by Peter Churchill, DSO, Croix de Guerre, published in 1954. It was the last of three books describing his wartime experience in the French section of the Special Operations Executive. It describes his captivity in France and Germany, and that of Odette Sansom, from April 1943 until the end of the war, when they were eventually released.

== Synopsis ==
The Spirit in the Cage describes the captivity of Peter Churchill and his courier, Odette Sansom, in France then in Germany. Churchill and Sansom claimed they were a married couple and related to Winston Churchill to make themselves seem more valuable as prisoners and less likely to be executed as spies. They were sent to different concentration camps, where they were sentenced to death, and Odette tortured, and but both escaped execution.

Churchill was initially taken to the German barracks in Annecy, then to Fresnes, where he remained until 13 February 1944, when he was transferred to Berlin for questioning. On 2 May, he was sent to Sonderlager “A” Sachsenhausen, where he was held in solitary confinement for 318 days out of 11 months. On 1 April 1945, he was moved by train to Flossenbürg, 50 miles south-east of Bayreuth, where he was held for 3–4 days before being taken by truck and Black Maria on a 30-hour trip to Dachau where he was lodged in the former official brothel at the Dachau concentration camp along with other officers of various nationalities. The next day, as the Americans were approaching Dachau, Churchill and 30 other officers were taken by bus to Innsbruck, where he was held in the Straflager. They were joined by 140 other notable prisoners (the Prominenten). On 24 April 1945, Churchill was taken from Dachau over the Brenner Pass to Villabassa (Niederdorf in the Tyrol), together with many other prominent concentration camp inmates from different countries, where the SS left the prisoners behind as American forces were approaching. He also excelled in sports – he had the reputation of being one of the finest ice-hockey blues the university had produced.

On 27 April, he was taken 15 miles to the south to Wildsee, where on 4 May he was liberated by the Fifth United States Army. He was taken to Naples for debriefing by officers from the Crimes Investigations Departments and testified against his former captors. On 12 May 1945, Churchill was flown back to England in the personal aircraft of Air Marshal Garrow.

Odette was sent to Ravensbrück, where she endured terrible torture, but revealed nothing to her captors.
