= Of Their Own Choice =

1952 book by Peter Churchill,

- Title page for Of Their Own Choice (1952)
- Author: Peter Churchill
- Genre: Non-fiction
- Publisher: Hodder and Stoughton
- Publication date: 1952

Of Their Own Choice is a book written by Peter Churchill, DSO, Croix de Guerre, published in 1952. It was the first of three books describing his wartime experience in the French section of the Special Operations Executive in which he was infiltrated four times into occupied France and spent 225 days behind enemy lines before he was captured.

== Synopsis ==
Of Their Own Choice was the first of three books describing his wartime experience in the French section of the Special Operations Executive.

He describes his initial training at Warnborough Manor, near Guildford, in sabotage, Morse code, use of firearms, bridge demolition, and French military drill; and then to the Scottish Highlands near Mallaig, for map reading, orienteering, weapons and explosives training, close combat, and physical training; and then parachute training at Ringway near Manchester. The final training was at the Finishing School at Beaulieu Abbey in the New Forest where he learnt railway sabotage, inconspicuous behaviour, codes, cover stories, how to build up networks, and how to behave under interrogation. Of 14 people who began the training, Churchill was one of only three who graduated.

He was assigned to the French Section in June 1941, and given his French identity card with a false identity. His first mission was to be infiltrated into the French Riviera by submarine in order to inspect three SOE networks in Antibes, Marseille and Lyon, evaluate their strengths weaknesses, assess their needs, and give them instructions. He was also to provide them with funds to continue their work. He was assisted by American agent, Virginia Hall. Having completed his mission he crossed the Pyrenees on foot and returned to the UK via Gibraltar to report back to SOE Headquarters.
