= Francis Cammaerts =

English espionage agent

Francis Charles Albert Cammaerts
- Born: 16 June 1916; France
- Died: 3 July 2006 (aged 90); Dio-et-Valquieres, Languedoc-Roussillon, France
- Spouse: Nancy Findlay (Nan)
- Children: 4
- Father: Émile Cammaerts
- Relatives: Marie Brema (maternal grandmother)
- Military career
- Allegiance: United Kingdom
- Branch: Resistance
- Service years: 1942–1945
- Rank: Lieutenant-Colonel
- Commands: Special Operations Executive: SW France
- Conflicts: World War II
- Awards: Distinguished Service Order, Legion d'honneur, Croix de Guerre, Medal of Freedom
- Other work: various, teaching

Francis Charles Albert Cammaerts, DSO (16 June 1916 – 3 July 2006), code named Roger, was an agent of the United Kingdom's clandestine Special Operations Executive (SOE) during World War II. The purpose of SOE was to conduct espionage, sabotage and reconnaissance in occupied Europe and Asia against the Axis powers, especially Nazi Germany. In France, SOE agents allied themselves with French Resistance groups and supplied them with weapons and equipment parachuted in from England. Cammaerts was the creator and the organiser (leader) of the Jockey network (or circuit) in southeastern France in 1943 and 1944.

At the beginning of World War II in 1939, Cammaerts declared himself a conscientious objector, but in 1942 he joined the SOE. He recruited and supplied with arms and training a large number of resistance networks and cells over an extensive area east of the Rhone River extending to the border with Italy and north from the Mediterranean Sea to the city of Grenoble. Despite being very careful in his work, Cammaerts was captured by the Germans in August 1944, but saved from execution by his courier, Christine Granville.

Of the more than 450 SOE agents who worked in France during World War II, M.R.D. Foot, the official historian of the SOE, named Cammaerts as one of the half-dozen best male agents. He was one of only three SOE agents to be promoted to the rank of Lt. Colonel, along with George Starr and Richard Heslop.

== Early life ==
Cammaerts was born in London and raised in Radlett in Hertfordshire, the son of Professor Emile Cammaerts, a Belgian poet, and Tita Brand, a successful actress. He was educated at Mill Hill School, where he was a contemporary of Francis Crick and Patrick Troughton. He became a pacifist in the 1930s while a student at St Catharine's College, Cambridge, where he read English and history and also won a hockey Blue. After university he briefly began a teaching career. He taught in Belfast before moving on to Beckenham and Penge County School for Boys, near London, where he taught with his close friend from university, Harry Rée who also joined the SOE.

In 1940, Cammaerts was refused registration as a conscientious objector by his Local Tribunal, but it was granted by the Appellate Tribunal, conditional upon him taking up agricultural work. He joined a farm training project at Holton cum Beckering, Lincolnshire. During this period he met Nancy Findlay (Nan), and they married on 15 March 1941. After the death of his brother Pieter while serving in the Royal Air Force, Cammaerts believed he could no longer stand aside from participation in the war, and, as a French speaker, he succumbed to the urging of Harry Rée to join SOE.

== SOE service ==
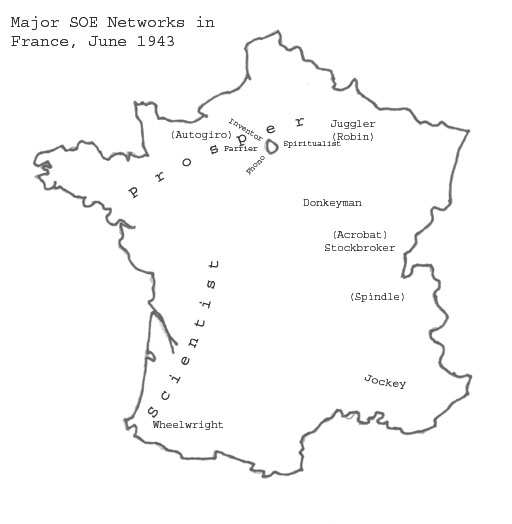
SOE networks in France, June 1943

=== A frightening beginning ===
Cammaerts began extensive training with SOE in October 1942. Training included fieldwork experience in the New Forest, Scotland and Manchester. Cammaerts was considered by some of his training officers to be lacking in physical skills, and 'more intellectual than practical'. Nevertheless, he was considered to be above average in all areas. He was given the rank of captain and the code name Roger, and flown into occupied northern France in March 1943. More than a dozen SOE circuits were active in France at that time. Cammaerts was assigned to the Donkeyman network or circuit, then operating in the upper Rhône Valley, but his reception party from Donkeyman and the Carte network drove him first to Paris, with a dangerous disregard for security that alerted him to the risks of such behaviour. Cammaerts concern was heightened by his appearance. He was 193 centimetres (6 ft 4 in) tall with feet so large his nickname in France was "Big Feet". He spoke French with a noticeable Belgian accent. Cammaerts' worries about security were confirmed one day after he arrived in Paris when Carte leader, André Marsac, was arrested by the Germans. Cammaerts fled Paris by train to Annecy

Near Annecy in the village of Saint Jorioz he met with Odette Sansom, Adolphe "Alex" Rabinovitch, and Auguste Floiras of the Spindle network. Once again his antenna warned him of the poor security of Spindle and he departed after two or three days for Cannes. Rabinovitch declined to work with Cammaerts because his "appearance was too English" and he spoke French with an "atrocious" accent, but gave him the address of a safe house in Cannes. Floiras would soon join Cammaerts and become his best friend and wireless operator; Sansom and several other members of the Spindle network were arrested and imprisoned shortly after Cammaerts departed Saint Jorioz. He spent a month in Cannes establishing his cover story as a teacher recovering from jaundice.

=== Security ===
Cammaerts worked primarily in rural areas. SOE networks were more secure in rural areas which had a much smaller presence of German soldiers and milice, the pro-German French militia, than large urban areas.

In the words of the official historian of the SOE M.R.D. Foot, impeccable security, the hallmark of the best SOE agents, characterized Cammaert's survival as an SOE agent for two tours totaling fifteen months, far longer than the average agent served or survived in France. Cammaerts never stayed in the same house for more than three or four nights, he avoided hotels as their registers were checked by German and French police, and he also avoided large train stations which frequently had check points. He never told anybody his plans, nor made appointments nor visited unknown addresses without careful reconnoitering. He did not communicate in writing or by telephone, nor did he know the real names of the people he worked with, only their field names. He had a squad of seven or eight men who followed and investigated potential recruits before they were contacted and he divided his recruits and associates into cells of no more than 15 persons each and discouraged contact between cells. Cammerts told his agents to always have a credible reason for being where they were if stopped by a German patrol.

While seeking air-tight security, Cammaerts said that he always informed the families in the places he spent nights, usually rural farmhouses or in villages, that he was English and left them no doubt of the danger they were in by hosting him. He was always received, he said, with "open arms". As in the case of others who operated in enemy-held territory for prolonged periods, he gave a great deal of credit to the ordinary French citizens who had provided him and his colleagues with safety and comfort. In the BBC TV series Secret Agent, broadcast in 2000, Cammaerts said, "The most important element was the French housewife who fed us, clothed us and kept us cheerful."

=== Jockey network ===
Disillusioned with what he had seen of the Carte Organization and the Spindle network, Cammaerts organised his own circuit (Jockey). He worked initially in the area of Montélimar. His first associate was wireless operator Auguste Fioras, a man as cautious as Cammaerts himself. The first message the pair sent to London was on 27 May 1943. Fioras would transmit 416 wireless messages to London during 1943 and 1944, a record for SOE wireless operators.

In the latter part of 1943, Cammaerts established several small semi-autonomous groups of resisters to the German occupation. They were located along the left bank of the Rhône between Vienne and Arles and eastwards through the hinterland and into the Alps. He traveled around on a motorbike visiting each group. By the end of 1943, Cammaerts had ensured that his Jockey circuit was ready to play its part in any sabotage that might be required. In November 1943 he was recalled to London for debriefing, and, while there, he raised the problems among the SOE agents working in France, often at cross-purposes, some under the command of General Charles de Gaulle's headquarters and others, many of them French citizens, under the command of SOE's French section.

On his return to France in February 1944, Cammaerts' aircraft crashed due to icing and an engine fire, although he was unhurt after bailing out along with the crew. He went on to check that his Jockey circuit was operational and later visited the 3,000+ group of Maquisards (young Frenchmen who had fled to the Vercors plateau to avoid being sent for forced labour in Germany). In April 1944, he informed SOE's London headquarters that the Vercors had a finely organised army, but they needed long-distance and anti-tank weapons. Cammaerts' Jockey circuit played its part following the Normandy Landings: they and the other SOE circuits cut railway lines and helped to severely hinder German troop and machinery movements. Cammaerts was appointed head of Allied missions in southeastern France. By this time he had built up an organisation of more than 10,000 people.

The situation in the area of the Vercors plateau did not fare so well, with London having refused Cammaerts' and others' requests to provide the Resistance with heavy weapons. Allied High Command felt, based on the Yugoslav experience, that guerrillas were not trained to stand and fight. Cammaerts understood and was even sympathetic to this view, but he had no control over the belief by French Resistance leaders that, with Allied landings taking place in the north, the war was coming to an end and the Germans were fatally weakened. In fact, Vercors was attacked by two German divisions complete with air support, and German reprisals were ruthless. It was a rout and the surviving Maquisards fled to whatever hiding places they could find, with an estimated 600-plus maquisards and civilians slaughtered.

=== Arrest and release ===
Despite his meticulous care for security, on 13 August 1944, two days before the Allied Operation Dragoon landings in southern France, Cammaerts, Xan Fielding, an SOE agent who had previously operated in Crete, and a French officer, Christian Sorensen, were arrested at a roadblock by the Gestapo at Digne-les-Bains. Cammaerts had received a large amount of money for operations which he divided among the three of them, an action that would prove a mistake. Entering Digne by automobile, they came upon a German checkpoint. Under questioning, Fielding denied knowing the other two, but a young German civilian examining their forged identity papers noticed that the serial numbers of the money each of them carried was in the same series, thus indicating a connection among them. The three were taken to Digne prison and roughly interrogated. They claimed they were involved in black marketing to account for the money. The Germans apparently did not know they had captured Cammaerts, the most important SOE agent in southeastern France, but decided to execute the three suspecting they were associated with the French resistance.

On August 17, Krystyna Skarbek, a.k.a. Christine Granville, a Polish-born SOE operative and Cammaerts' lover, managed to get Cammaerts and the others released. She confronted two collaborators, Albert Schenck, a French liaison officer to the Gestapo, and Max Waem, a Belgian interpreter for the Gestapo, telling them that American troops would arrive within hours and that if they did not co-operate she would ensure the pair were handed over to an avenging mob of French citizenry. The collaborators agreed to the release of Cammaerts, Fielding and their French colleague, on condition of the payment of a two million franc ransom, which Skarbek obtained by an airdrop from London. The three SOE agents were to be executed on the evening of the day that Skarbek negotiated their release. The rescue of Cammaerts is fictionalized in the last episode of the British television show Wish Me Luck.

=== Helping the allies ===
Digne was liberated by the American army two days after Cammaerts was released from prison. The maquis had cleared the way for the Americans and there was little opposition. On August 20, Cammaerts and Granville met the American commander, Brigadier General Frederic B. Butler, at Sisteron who dismissed them as "bandits". Leaving the American army behind, the two proceeded to Gap where the maquis had captured the German garrison. Several hundred Polish soldiers, soldiers in the German army, were among the captured Germans. Granville addressed the Poles with a megaphone and secured their agreement to join the Allied forces, provided that they shed their German uniforms. The Poles stripped off their uniforms. General Butler arrived and disapproved of the proceedings, threatening Cammaerts and Granville with arrest and court martial if they didn't leave. Author Arthur Funk said, "The historian can only wonder at Butler's short-sightedness in ignoring a British officer who knew a great deal about the terrain and the people in it." Later, Cammaerts and Granville received a better reception from Butler's superior officer, General Alexander Patch, who appointed them as the liaison for the Americans with the maquis. The couple continued northward to Lyon and Paris.

Cammaerts' time in occupied France ended in September 1944. He was promoted to lieutenant-colonel, awarded the Distinguished Service Order and the Legion d'honneur, Croix de Guerre and the American Medal of Freedom for his work in south-eastern France.

== SAARF and immediately post-war ==
In March 1945, when the Allies had crossed the Rhine, Cammaerts was asked to join the Special Allied Airborne Reconnaissance Force (SAARF). Many of the personnel were SOE or OSS agents. Their main objective was to help in the reconstruction work in Germany after the fall of Hitler. For Cammaerts, it primarily meant dealing with the appalling aftermath of the newly liberated concentration camps. Cammaerts visited Dachau, Belsen and Ravensbruck. He was appalled and felt impotent in the face of what he found. He later said "the SAARF period was blank and grey and one of those certain areas in my life when I didn't know what I was doing." The SAARF was disbanded in July 1945.

Cammaerts wanted to be transferred to work in the diplomatic world, but despite his extraordinary war record the Foreign Office considered Cammaerts to be a foreigner, as his father was Belgian, and so unable to work at the Foreign Office. In 1946, he was offered work in Brussels with the Inter-Allied Reparations Agency, and he was able to move with his family to Belgium for 18 months. In 1948, a daughter, Christine (named after Christine Granville), was born with multiple disabilities. For the remainder of her short life, Christine's circumstances played a large part in the decisions made by the Cammaertses about their own lives.

== Education work and retirement ==
In 1948, Cammaerts became the first Director of the Central Bureau for Educational Visits and Exchanges, which was a UNESCO agency and enabled him to undertake international trips including to the USA. In 1952, Cammaerts returned to teaching, with the encouragement of John Newsom and Ronald Gould. He later became the headmaster of Alleyne's Grammar School in Stevenage for nine years, at a time when Stevenage New Town was growing rapidly. Cammaerts was keen to implement the Labour Government's move towards comprehensive education, encouraged by Newsom. Alleynes enrolment increased from 170 to roughly 600 boys during Cammaerts' tenure, and new classroom blocks were added.

Cammaerts did not forget his wartime lover, Christine Granville. Following her murder in 1952, he became part of a group of men dedicated to ensuring that her name not be "sullied and succeeded in stopping several press reports and two books" to protect her from stories of her active and diverse sex life.

He was the subject of This Is Your Life in 1958 when he was surprised by Eamonn Andrews at the BBC Television Theatre. In 1959, he appeared for the defence in the notorious trial of Penguin Books over the publication of D.H. Lawrence's Lady Chatterley's Lover. The trial, at the Old Bailey was front-page news and Cammaerts' statement under cross-examination that he had let members of his 6th Form read the book and they did not appear to have been corrupted or become depraved, was widely reported. The publisher won the case.

He was Principal of the Leicester Teacher Training college in Scraptoft, between 1961 and 1966, overseeing a liberalising of the training methods used. He then moved to Kenya to help with the development of the country's education system in the immediate post-colonial period. Cammaerts became Professor of Education in Nairobi from 1966 to 1972. He later returned to England, to become head of Rolle College, a teacher training college at Exmouth, which later became part of University of Plymouth. In 1981, aged 65, he came out of retirement to start a teacher training college in Botswana. He had a major impact on the development of education on all levels in the country, which had the most advanced policies on the African continent. Cammaerts finally retired in 1987, returning to live in the south of France until his death in 2006.

Cammaerts' nephew, children's author Michael Morpurgo, in his novel, In the Mouth of the Wolf, wrote about Cammaerts' time in the Resistance.

== See also ==
- List of SOE agents
- SOE F Section networks
- SOE F Section timeline

== Sources ==
- Jenkins, Ray, A Pacifist at War: The Life of Francis Cammaerts, Hutchinson, 2009, ISBN 978-0-091-92557-4.
- Mulley, Clare (2012). The Spy Who Loved: The Secrets and Lives of One of Britain's Bravest Wartime Heroines. Macmillan. ISBN 978-1-4472-0118-2.
