= Odette Hallowes =

French resistance member (1912–1995)

Odette Sansom Hallowes
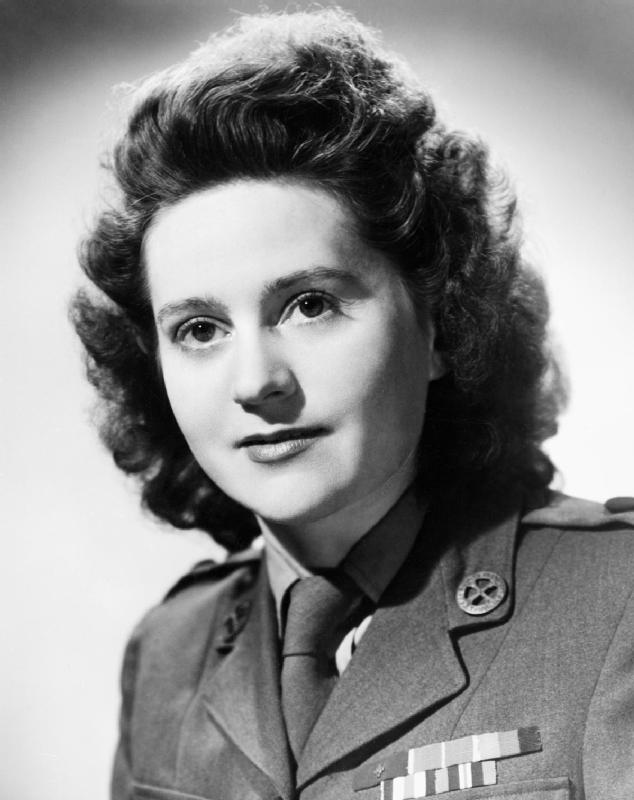
- Odette Hallowes in 1946
- Born: 28 April 1912; Amiens, France
- Died: 13 March 1995 (aged 82); Walton-on-Thames, Surrey, England
- Spouse(s): Roy Sansom (1931–46); Peter Churchill (1947–55); Geoffrey Hallowes (1956–95)
- Military career
- Allegiance: United Kingdom
- Branch: First Aid Nursing Yeomanry
- Service years: 1942–1945
- Rank: Lieutenant
- Units: Special Operations Executive; Spindle network
- Conflicts: Second World War
- Awards: George Cross; Member of the Order of the British Empire; Chevalier de la Légion d'honneur (France)

Odette Marie Léonie Céline Hallowes, GC, MBE (née Brailly; 28 April 1912 – 13 March 1995), also known as Odette Churchill and Odette Sansom, code named Lise, was an agent for the United Kingdom's clandestine Special Operations Executive (SOE) in France during the Second World War. She was the first woman to be awarded the George Cross by the United Kingdom and was awarded the Légion d'honneur by France.

The purpose of SOE was to conduct espionage, sabotage, and reconnaissance in occupied Europe against the Axis powers, especially Germany. SOE agents allied themselves with resistance groups and supplied them with weapons and equipment parachuted in from England.

Sansom arrived in France on the night of 3/4 November 1942 to work as a courier with the Spindle network (or circuit) of SOE headed by Peter Churchill (whom she later married). In January 1943, to evade arrest, Churchill and Sansom moved their operations to near Annecy in the French Alps. She and Churchill were arrested there on 16 April 1943 by spy-hunter Hugo Bleicher. She spent the rest of the war imprisoned in Ravensbrück concentration camp.

Her wartime experiences and endurance of a brutal interrogation and imprisonment, which were chronicled in books and a motion picture, made her one of the more prominent members of the SOE, and one of the few to survive Nazi imprisonment.

== Early years ==
Odette Marie Léonie Céline Brailly was born on 28 April 1912 at 208, rue des Corroyers in Amiens, France; the daughter of Emma Rose Marie Yvonne née Quennehen (Note: Born 16 Aug 1886 in Abbeville, France, moved to England with her daughter and died in 1960. She is buried with Odette at Burvale cemetery where her name is given as Yvonne Marie Rose Brailly.) and Florentin Désiré Eugène 'Gaston' Brailly, (Note: Born 26 Feb 1881 in Ivry-sur-Seine, France, died 14 Oct 1918 from wounds received on 26 September at the battle of Mesnil. He was awarded the Croix de Guerre with a bronze star.) a bank manager, killed at Verdun shortly before the Armistice in 1918 and posthumously awarded the Croix de Guerre and Médaille militaire for heroism. She had one brother. As a child she contracted serious illnesses which blinded her for three and a half years, as well as polio, which resulted in her being bedridden for months. She had a convent education and was considered difficult, perhaps because of her illnesses.

She met an Englishman, Roy Patrick Sansom (1911–1957), (Note: The son of Lillie née Parkington and Abbey Sansom of Colchester. After the war and his separation from Odette he married Carla Schmidt (1921–2004).) in Boulogne and married him in Boulogne-sur-Mer on 27 October 1931, moving with him to Britain. The couple had three daughters: Françoise Edith, born 1932 in Boulogne; Lily Marie, born 1934 in Fulham; and Marianne Odette, born 1936 in Fulham. Mr. Sansom joined the army at the beginning of the Second World War, and Odette Sansom and the children moved to Somerset for their safety.

== Second World War service ==
=== Recruited by SOE ===
In the spring of 1942, the Admiralty appealed for postcards or family photographs taken on the French coastline for possible war use. Hearing the broadcast, Sansom wrote that she had photographs taken around Boulogne, but she mistakenly sent her letter to the War Office instead of the Admiralty. That brought her to the attention of Colonel Maurice Buckmaster's Special Operations Executive.

As cover for her secret work, Sansom was enrolled in the First Aid Nursing Yeomanry, which supplied SOE with support personnel. She left her three daughters in a convent school, and was trained to be sent into Nazi-occupied France to work with the French Resistance.

Originally Sansom was considered too temperamental and stubborn by SOE, with an evaluation stating "She is impulsive and hasty in her judgments and has not quite the clarity of mind which is desirable in subversive activity. She seems to have little experience of the outside world. She is excitable and temperamental, although she has a certain determination." However, the evaluation noted "her patriotism and keenness to do something for France." Buckmaster allowed her training to continue regardless. A bad fall during training ruled out parachute entry into France.

=== Service in France ===
Sansom made a landing on a beach near Cassis on the night of 3/4 November 1942, and made contact with Captain Peter Churchill, who headed Spindle, an SOE network based in Cannes. Her code name was "Lise". Sansom's initial objective was to contact the French Resistance on the French Riviera, and then move to Auxerre in Burgundy to establish a safe house for other agents.

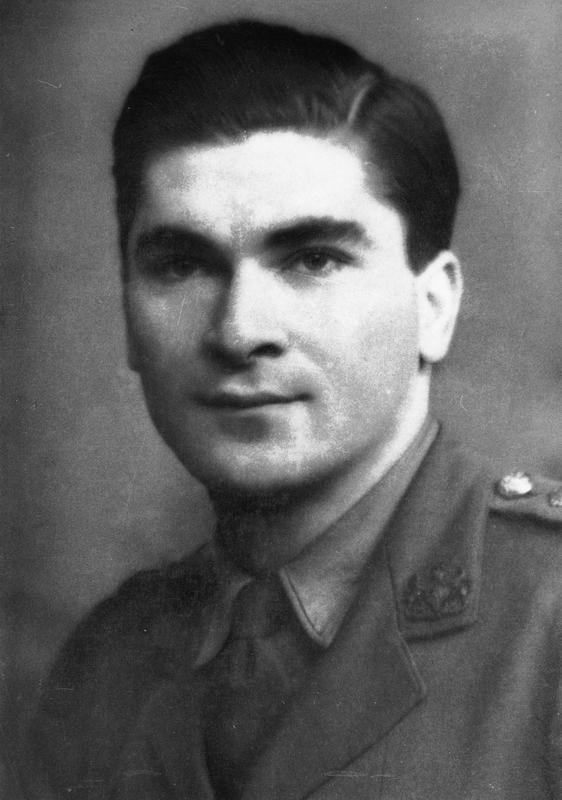
Adolphe Rabinovitch

At the time of her arrival in France, the Spindle network was beset by internal strife between the principal agent, André Girard, his assistant and the network's radio operator, Adolphe Rabinovitch. A list of 200 potential supporters, lost by André Marsac, a Girard courier, was obtained by the Germans. With Sansom stranded in Cannes, Churchill obtained Buckmaster's permission to scrap her original mission and for her to act as his courier. Sansom, posing as "Madame Odette Metayer", was required to find food and lodging for Rabinovitch, who was in France illegally and had no ration card, as well as to tend to air drops that were sometimes carelessly placed in dangerous areas. Her work brought her initially to Marseille, then considered a dangerous town because of its infiltration by German agents. Sansom was shocked by the lax attitude towards security by her French supporters. Sansom grew close to Churchill and to Rabinovitch, whom she liked and trusted. She later recalled that she had suspicions of disloyalty about other members of the Spindle network, but declined to identify whom she suspected.

=== Captured ===
In January 1943, the Spindle team of Churchill, Rabinovich, and Sansom, feeling vulnerable to German capture, moved north from the French Riviera to the quiet Italian-occupied Annecy area in the French Alps. Churchill and Sansom took up residence at the Hotel de la Poste in the village of Saint-Jorioz. They were joined there by several other members of the Carte network and SOE, a gathering which attracted the attention of the Italian fascist police and the Gestapo. SOE agent Francis Cammaerts visited Annecy briefly in March or early April 1943 and assessed the security of Churchill and Sansom's network as deficient and likely to be penetrated by the Germans.

Meanwhile, in Paris in mid-March, spy-catcher Hugo Bleicher, an Abwehr counterintelligence officer, arrested Marsac, persuading him and another Carte associate, Roger Bardet, that he was an anti-Nazi German colonel and that they should work together. He learned from Marsac the location of Churchill and Sansom, got a letter of introduction to them from him, and proceeded to Saint-Jorioz where he introduced himself to Sansom as "Colonel Henri". He spun a tale to her of them travelling together to London to "discuss means of ending the war." He then departed Saint-Jorioz with a plan to return and for them to leave France together clandestinely by aircraft on April 18. Sansom instructed Rabinovich to send a wireless message to SOE headquarters in London reporting the contact. London replied immediately: "Henri highly dangerous... you are to hide across lake and cut contacts with all save Arnaud [Rabinovich]..."

Churchill was in London consulting with SOE at the time of Bleicher's meeting with Sansom. He was warned to avoid contact with Sansom and 'Colonel Henri" on his return to France, but when he was parachuted back into the Annecy area on April 14/15, he was met by Sansom and Rabinovich. As Sansom did not anticipate Henri's return until April 18, she and Churchill proceeded to the hotel in Saint-Jorioz. At 2:00 a.m. on April 16, Bleicher, no longer in the guise of "Colonel Henri", appeared in the hotel with Italian soldiers and arrested Sansom and Churchill.

=== Imprisonment ===
==== Fresnes Prison ====
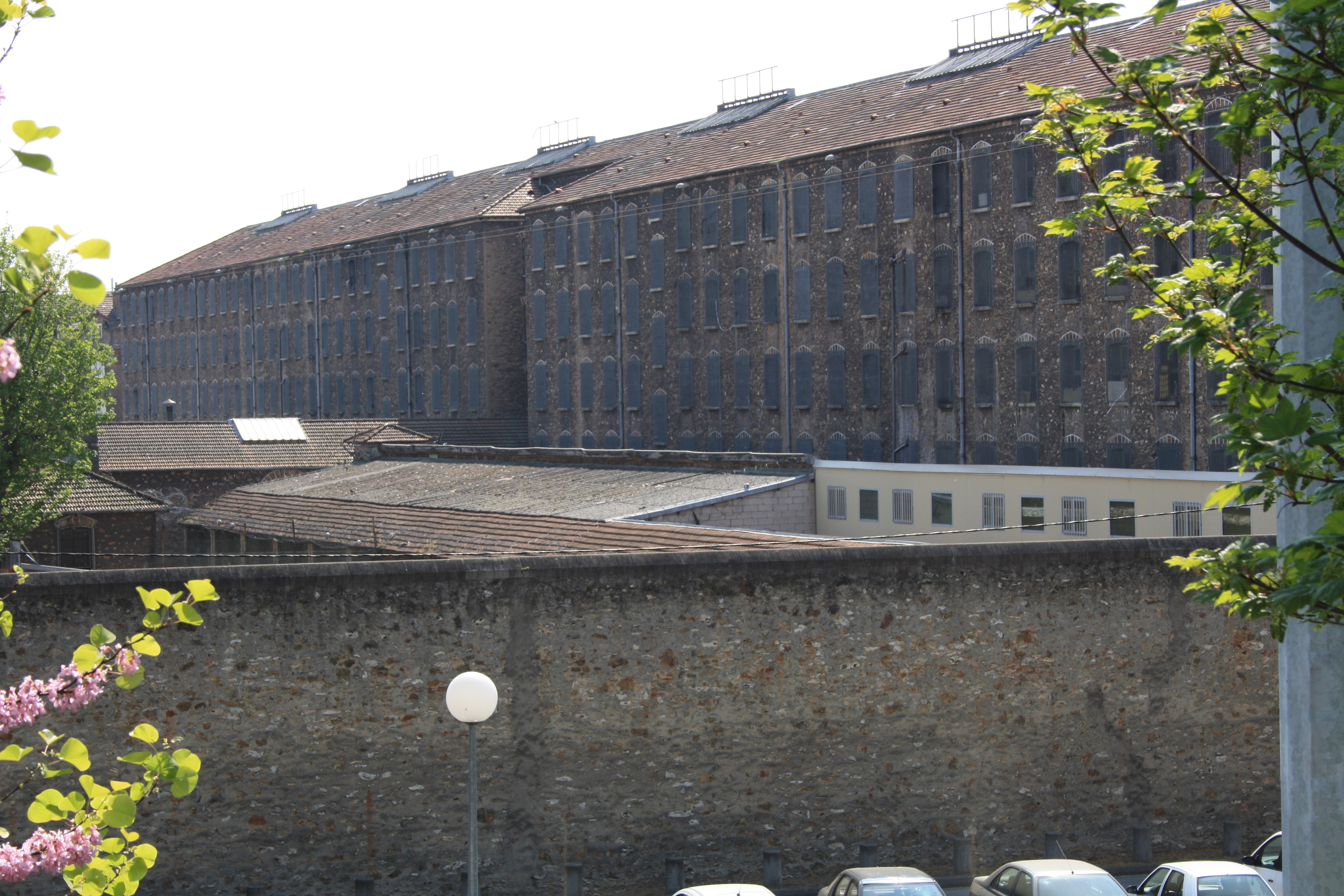
Fresnes Prison

At Fresnes prison, near Paris, Sansom was interrogated by the Gestapo fourteen times. She was subjected to torture. Her back was scorched with a red-hot poker and all of her toenails were pulled out. She refused to disclose the whereabouts of Rabinovitch and another British agent, stuck to her fabricated cover story that Churchill was the nephew of Prime Minister Winston Churchill, that she was his wife, and that he knew nothing of her activities. The hope was that, in this way, their treatment would be mitigated. Odette had calculated that, if the Germans thought she was related to the British Prime Minister, they would want to keep her and Peter alive as a possible bargaining tool.

Sansom succeeded in diverting attention from Churchill, who was subject to only two interrogations, and protected the identities of the two officers whose locations were known only to her. Bleicher occasionally appeared and suggested that they might go to concerts and visit restaurants together in Paris, in return for which he hoped she could be induced to talk. Sansom rejected the overtures.

In June 1943, Sansom was condemned to death on two counts, to which she responded, "Then you will have to make up your mind on what count I am to be executed, because I can only die once." Infuriated, Bleicher sent her to Ravensbrück concentration camp.

==== Ravensbruck concentration camp ====
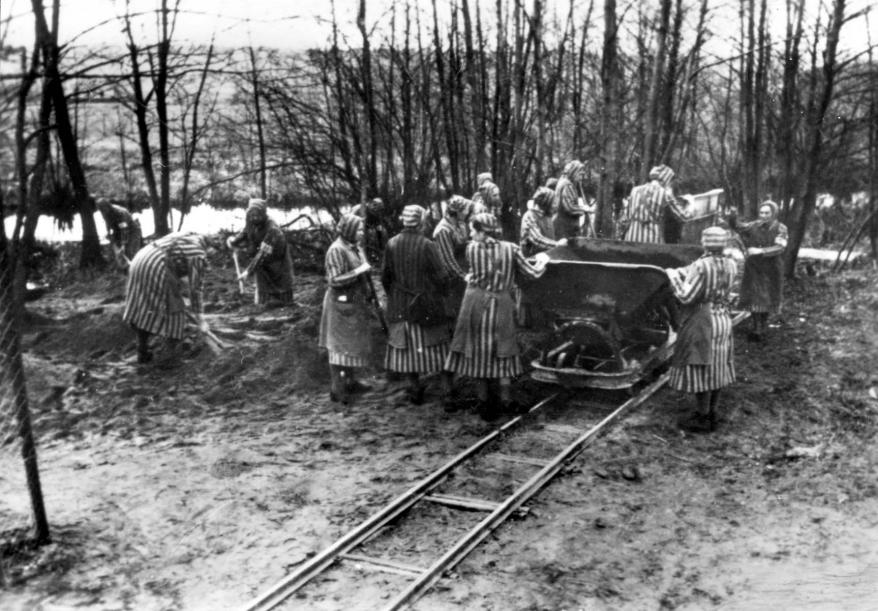
Ravensbruck inmates in 1939

In Ravensbruck, Sansom was kept in a punishment block cell, on a starvation diet, and could hear other prisoners being beaten.

After the Allied landings in the south of France in August 1944, on orders from Berlin, all food was withdrawn for a week, all light was removed from Sansom's cell, and the heat was turned up. Despite a report by the camp doctor that she would not survive such conditions for more than a few weeks, after being found unconscious in her cell, she was placed in solitary confinement. Her conditions only improved in December 1944, when she was moved to a ground floor cell. The cell was located near the crematorium and would be covered with burned hair from the cremations. At one point toward the end of the war, she witnessed an instance of cannibalism of a dead inmate by starving prisoners.

When the Allies were only a few miles from Ravensbrück, the camp commandant Fritz Suhren forced Sansom into his car and drove to the advancing Americans to surrender. He hoped that her supposed connections to the Prime Minister might allow him to negotiate his way out of execution. Sansom removed Suhren's pistol, which is now held in the Imperial War Museum.

Peter Churchill survived the war but Rabinovitch was executed by the Gestapo in 1944.

==== Survival methods ====
Sansom was aided in her endurance in prison by her early blindness and paralysis, and by the example of her grandfather, who "did not accept weakness very easily." She also accepted in advance that she might be captured by the Germans. She adopted an attitude of defiance, and found that this resulted in a degree of respect by her captors and helped her survive the imprisonment mentally.

Sansom said she believed she was "not brave, not courageous, but just made up [her] mind about certain things." She recalled in a post-war interview that while everyone has a breaking point, her feeling was that if she could "survive the next minute without breaking up, that is another minute of life. And if I can think that way instead of thinking what is going to happen in a half-hour's time," because of her past illnesses, she knew "I was able to accept this, and survive it." By accepting death, she felt that "they would not win anything. They'll have a dead body, useless to them. They won't have me. I won't let them have me." She described it as a "kind of bargaining."

The Germans generally found persons of the prisoners' own nationality to carry out the torture, she later recalled, so that one "could not say they were tortured by the Germans." Her torture was carried out by a "very good-looking young Frenchman" who she believed was mentally ill.

== After the war ==
Sansom testified against the prison guards charged with war crimes at the 1946 Hamburg Ravensbrück Trials, which resulted in Suhren's execution in 1950. Roy and Odette's marriage was dissolved in 1946 and she married Peter Churchill in 1947.

In 1951, her home was burgled and the George Cross stolen. After an appeal by her mother, it was returned with a note saying: "You, Madame, appear to be a dear old lady. God bless you and your children. I thank you for having faith in me. I am not all that bad — it's just circumstances. Your little dog really loves me. I gave him a nice pat and left him a piece of meat — out of fridge. Sincerely yours, A Bad Egg." In 1955, she co-founded the annual Women of the Year Lunch with Tony Lothian and Lady Georgina Coleridge (journalist and daughter of the Marquess of Tweeddale).

She was divorced from Churchill in 1955 and married Geoffrey Hallowes, a former SOE officer, in 1956.

She died on 13 March 1995 in Walton-on-Thames, Surrey, England, aged 82.

== Post war ==
Sansom, known as Odette Churchill after her marriage, gained considerable fame after the publication of a 1949 biography and a film on her war work and prison ordeal in 1950. She became what one biographer described as a "celebrated heroine on both sides of the Channel." However, her story was not without controversy. Some officials did not believe her story and cast doubt upon her integrity.

She was appointed a Member of the Order of the British Empire and was the first of three Second World War First Aid Nursing Yeomanry members to be awarded the George Cross (gazetted 20 August 1946), all for work with the SOE. She remains the only woman to have received the George Cross while alive, all other female awards to date being posthumous. She was also appointed a Chevalier de la Légion d'honneur for her work with the French Resistance.

Documents disclosed long after the war indicate that her superiors had to fight for Sansom's George Cross, because she was unable to prove that she had been tortured by the Nazis and that she had not betrayed her fellow agents. The medal was awarded after medical records and eyewitness testimony supported her case.

Her wartime record was the subject of a 1950 film, Odette, in which the title role was played by Anna Neagle and Trevor Howard played Churchill. Buckmaster played himself in the film, and Sansom, then known as Odette Churchill, wrote a personal message that appeared at the end of the film, which was well received. Odette Churchill had opposed making the film in Hollywood, for fear that the film would be fictionalised. The fame that the movie brought to Odette Sansom and Peter Churchill also brought criticism from their former associates in SOE and the French Resistance. A manifesto signed by about 20 former associates accused Churchill of being in France only to collect material for a book about his experiences and asked what acts of sabotage he and Odette had carried out.

She served as a technical advisor on a film on her fellow SOE agent Violette Szabo, Carve Her Name with Pride.

== Legacy ==
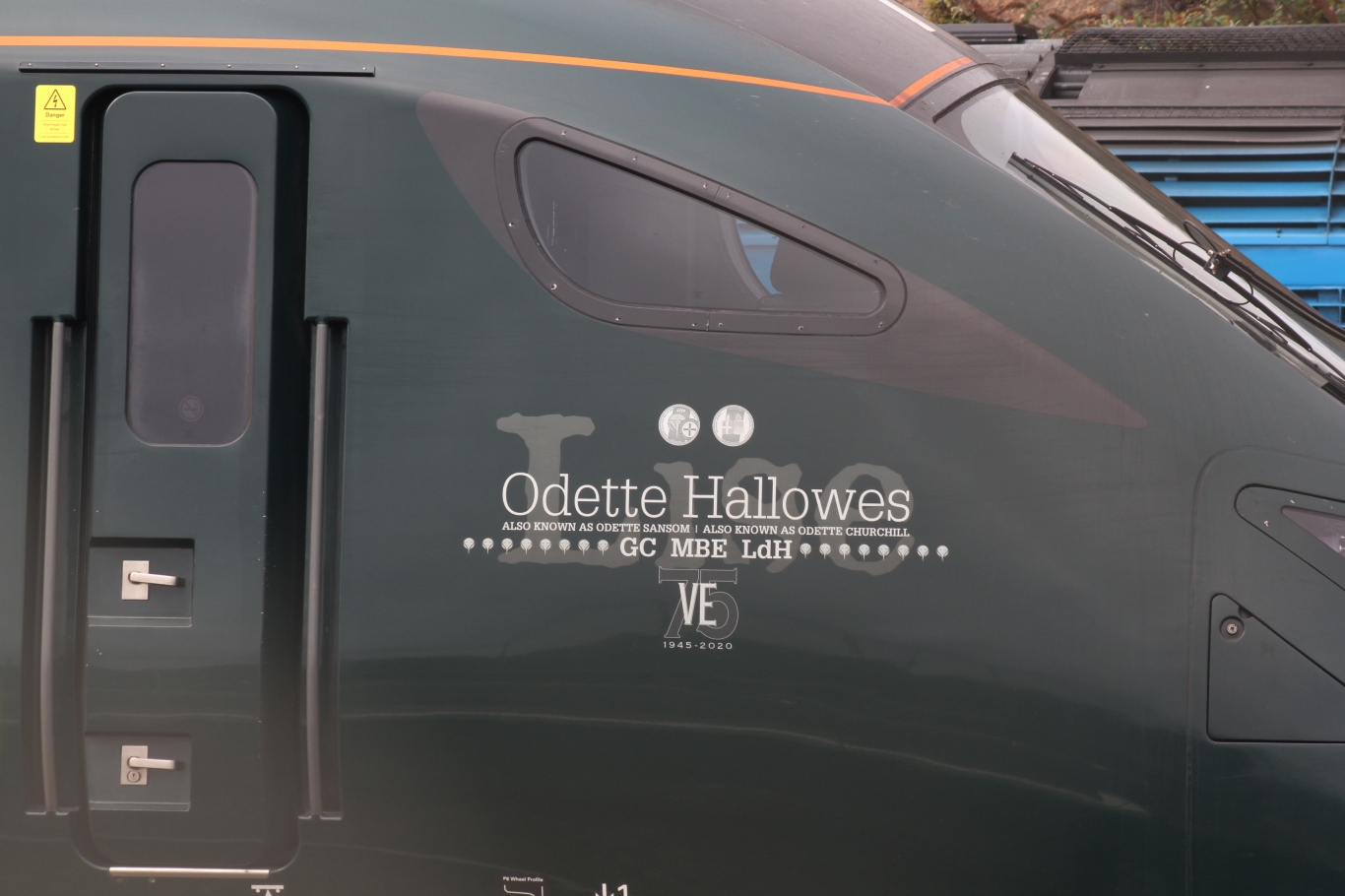
The Great Western Railway train carrying her name

On 23 February 2012, the Royal Mail released a postage stamp featuring Hallowes as part of its "Britons of Distinction" series.

On 6 March 2020 Great Western Railway named a Class 800 train after her; the ceremony in Odette's honour was held at Paddington Station in London and attended by Anne, Princess Royal.

A Blue Plaque was unveiled in Odette Sansom's memory in May 2025 by English Heritage. It was installed on 6 Lawrence Road, South Ealing, in West London, where she was living with her family when the Second World War broke out in 1939.

== Military honours ==
Her honours consisted of: (Note: Medal entitlement reflects medals Hallowes wore post-war.)

UK	George Cross
UK	Member of the Order of the British Empire (Civil)
UK	1939-45 Star
UK	Defence Medal
UK	War Medal 1939-45
UK	Queen Elizabeth II Coronation Medal
UK	Queen Elizabeth II Silver Jubilee Medal
France	Legion d’Honneur (Chevalier)

== Bibliography ==
- Escott, Beryl (2012). The Heroines of SOE: F Section: Britain's Secret Women in France. Stroud, UK: The History Press. ISBN 978-0752487298.
- Loftis, Larry (2019). Code name: Lise: The True Story of World War II's Most Highly Decorated Spy (Hardcover ed.). New York: Gallery Books. ISBN 9781501198656.
- Lovell, George (2000). Consultancy, Ministry & Mission by George Lovell. London, UK: Continuum. ASIN B01K93616E.
- Starnes, Penny (2010). Odette: World War Two's Darling Spy. London, UK: The History Press. ISBN 978-0752449722.
- Kramer, Rita (1966). Flames in the Fields. Penguin Books
- Salvesen, Sylvia (1947). Tilgi – men glem ikke (in Norwegian). Oslo: Aschehoug.
  - English edition: Forgive - but do not forget, London: Hutchinson, 1958, translated by Evelyn Ramsden, revised & edited by Lord Russell of Liverpool who also wrote the foreword.
- Tickell, Jerrard (1956). Odette: The story of a British agent. London, UK: Chapman & Hall. ASIN B0007K5U0I.
