= André Girard (1901–1968) =

French painter

André Girard (25 May 1901, Chinon, Indre-et-Loire – 2 September 1968, Nyack, New York) was a French painter, poster-maker and Resistance worker. During the Second World War he founded and headed the CARTE network, also taking "Carte" as his personal codename.

== Life ==
=== Prewar ===
He was the eldest child born to a pair of brewers, and attended the École des Beaux-Arts before his military service at Saint-Cyr. He developed friendships with both Georges Rouault and Pierre Bonnard. He became a painter, as well as a caricaturist and theatre set designer. He was one of the best known publicity poster designers in Paris during the 1930s. He set himself up in Venice in 1936–37 and in Manhattan in 1938.

=== 1939–45 ===
Having married Andrée Jouan (known as "la petite Andrée") and had 4 children (all daughters, including Danièle Delorme) before war broke out, he was not called up in 1939. He refused to see the Germans enter Paris after their success in the Battle of France, and departed in 1940 for the free zone of France, setting up at Antibes. There he painted his four daughters and founded the CARTE network. He was apolitical and tended towards recruitment and spying ready for an armed uprising against the Germans. At first hostile to Gaullism, he aroused the interest of the Special Operations Executive, who carried out a favourable evaluation of him and his network and then supplied him with arms, radio operators and money.

In July 1942 Nicholas Bodington, second in command of SOE's F section, landed in France to check on the value of reports about CARTE transmitted by agent Francis Basin, but on 12 September that year Bodington filed a report confirming SOE's highly favourable opinion of the network. However, security indiscretions and differences between Girard and his second in command Henri Frager weakened the network. For example, in November 1942 a suitcase containing a list of 200 CARTE members disappeared, either lost by André Marsac when he fell asleep on a train and finally falling into Abwehr hands, or being lost by Marsac in Marseille and coming into the hands of Dubois, police commissioner and head of security for CARTE, who then let the interested parties know of its loss via Bartroli de Mandres. Whichever account is true, no arrests resulted from the loss in the end, but CARTE was fatally weakened and the SOE network Prosper - PHYSICIAN largely took over its work (particularly using its important intelligence files).

In 1943 Girard refused to merge CARTE with COMBAT, feeling it to be too close to Gaullism, and on the night of 20/21 February that year flew to England on SOE orders, having been picked up by a Lockheed A-28 Hudson near Arles. SOE opposed his returning to France, even when he learned of his wife's arrest and deportation to Ravensbrück concentration camp (she was only released in 1945). He thus broke with SOE and went into self-imposed exile in the United States of America, where he remained until his death. There he gave conferences and wrote articles and books to vent his opposition to both the British and the Gaullists, thus pushing himself into relative obscurity.

=== Post-war ===
In New York, he produced several religious paintings (Stations of the Cross, Apocalypse, etc.) and in 1952 he decorated several churches in New York, California and Blessed Sacrament Catholic Church in Stowe, Vermont. In 1947 he published Peut-on dire la vérité sur la Résistance, in which he presented several important corrections to Bénouville's book Le Sacrifice du matin. He died and was buried in America in 1968.

== Recognition ==
He was awarded the American Legion of Merit.

== Works ==
- Bataille secrète en France, Brentano's, New York, 1944.
- Peut-on dire la vérité sur la Résistance ?, Éditions du Chêne, 1947.
- Hitler Staline et compagnie, Dessins politiques de 1934 à 1942, Buchet-Chastel 2005 (preface by Danièle Delorme, timeline and historical commentaries by Pascal Imaho)
