= Saint-Jorioz =

Saint-Jorioz San-Zhouryo (Arpitan)
- Commune
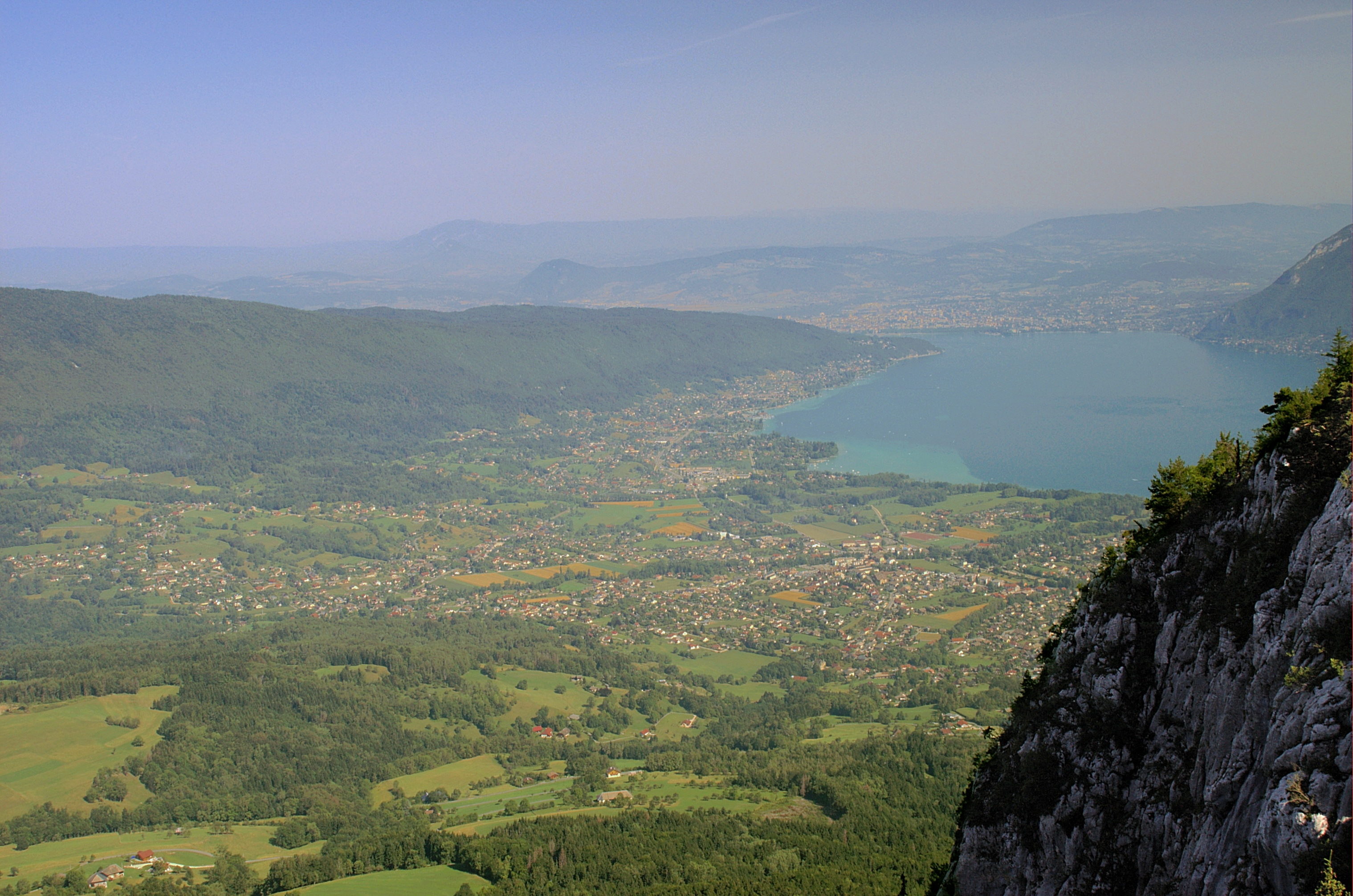
- The town seen from the Col de la Cochette

- Coat of arms
- Location of Saint-Jorioz
- Location within France Location within Auvergne-Rhône-Alpes
- Coordinates: 45°49′59″N 6°10′01″E
- Country: France
- Region: Auvergne-Rhône-Alpes
- Department: Haute-Savoie
- Arrondissement: Annecy
- Canton: Annecy-4
- Intercommunality: CA Grand Annecy

Government
  - Mayor (2020–2026): Michel Beal
- Area^{1}: 21.12 km^{2} (8.15 sq mi)
- Highest elevation: 1,657 m (5,436 ft)
- Lowest elevation: 443 m (1,453 ft)
- Population (2023): 6,390
  - Density: 303/km^{2} (784/sq mi)
- Demonym: Saint-Joriens / Saint-Joriennes
- Time zone: UTC+01:00 (CET)
  - Summer (DST): UTC+02:00 (CEST)
- INSEE/Postal code: 74242 /74410
- Website: Saint-jorioz.fr
- ^{1} French Land Register data, which excludes lakes, ponds, glaciers > 1 km^{2} (0.386 sq mi or 247 acres) and river estuaries.

Saint-Jorioz (French pronunciation: [sɛ̃ ʒɔʁjo]; Arpitan: San-Zhouryo), located on the western banks of lake Annecy, is a commune in the Haute-Savoie department in the Auvergne-Rhône-Alpes region in south-eastern France.

== Population ==
Historical population
Year	Pop.	±% p.a.
1968	1,831	—
1975	2,446	+4.22%
1982	3,344	+4.57%
1990	4,178	+2.82%
1999	5,002	+2.02%
2007	5,694	+1.63%
2012	5,752	+0.20%
2017	5,738	−0.05%
2023	6,390	+1.81%
Source: INSEE

== World Heritage Site ==
It is home to one or more prehistoric pile-dwelling (or stilt house) settlements that are part of the Prehistoric Pile dwellings around the Alps UNESCO World Heritage Site.

== See also ==
- Communes of the Haute-Savoie department
