= Vera Leigh =

British intelligence agent (1903–1944)

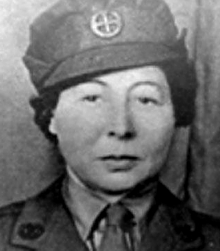
- In FANY uniform (circa 1943)
- Born: Vera Glass; 17 March 1903; Leeds, England
- Died: 6 July 1944 (aged 41); Natzweiler-Struthof, France
- Military career
- Allegiance: Britain, France
- Branch: French Resistance; Special Operations Executive
- Service years: 1940–1943 (French Resistance), 1943–1944 (SOE)
- Rank: Ensign (FANY)
- Nicknames: Simone, Almoner (SOE codenames), Suzanne Chavanne (alias while working as an SOE agent in France)
- Units: Donkeyman, Inventor (SOE)
- Conflicts: Second World War
- Awards: King's Commendation for Brave Conduct

Vera Leigh (17 March 1903 – 6 July 1944) was an agent of the United Kingdom's clandestine Special Operations Executive during World War II.

Leigh was a member of the SOE's Donkeyman circuit and Inventor sub-circuit in occupied France until she was arrested by the Gestapo. She was subsequently executed at the Natzweiler-Struthof concentration camp.

== Early life ==
Vera Leigh was born Vera Glass on 17 March 1903 in Leeds, England. She had been abandoned as a baby and adopted while still an infant by H. Eugene Leigh, a well-known American racehorse trainer with an English wife, who renamed his adopted daughter Vera Eugenie Leigh. After Mr Leigh's death, his wife married Albert Clark, whose son Victor Alexander Dalzell Clark became Leigh's step-brother and friend. When it came necessary to name a next-of-kin, Leigh chose Clark.

Vera grew up around the stables of Maisons Laffitte, the training centre and racing course near Paris. Clark later remembered that, as a child, she wanted to be a jockey when she grew up. In fact, she moved from the world of racing to the equally fashionable one of haute couture. After gaining experience as a vendeuse at the house of Caroline Reboux, she went into partnership with two friends to found the grande maison Rose Valois in the Place Vendôme in 1927, when she was only 24. In the pre-war decade, she moved into the sophisticated social scene of le Tout Paris.

== French Resistance ==
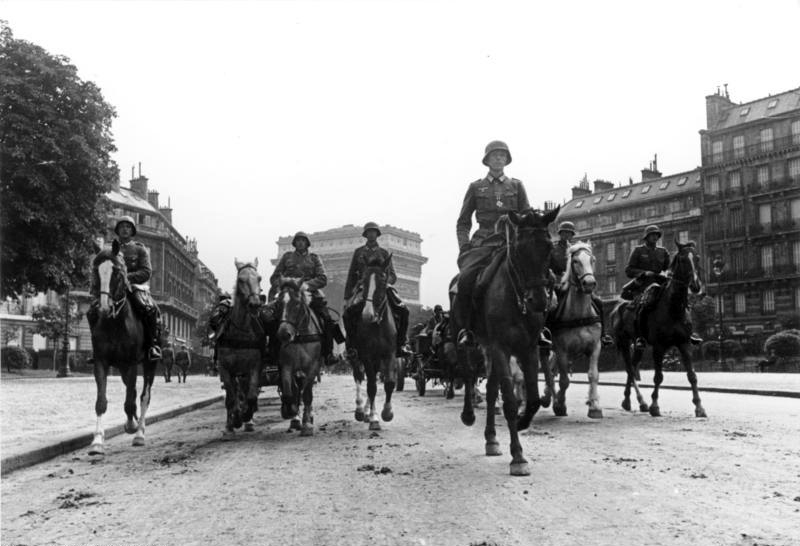
German troops in Paris (1940).

When Paris fell in 1940, she left for Lyon to join her fiancé of seven years, a man called Charles Sussaix, the managing director of a Portuguese-owned film company. She had intended to find a way, with his help, to get to England, but she became involved with the underground escape lines, guiding fugitive Allied servicemen out of the country, and it was not until 1942 that she herself took the route over the Pyrenees into Spain. As with many who made this journey, Spanish authorities put her in the internment camp at Miranda de Ebro, about 65 kilometres south of Bilbao. Through the efforts of a British embassy official, she was released, and helped to make her way to England via Gibraltar.

== Special Operations Executive ==
Leigh arrived in England at the end of 1942, with the intentions of offering her services for the war effort, and was soon identified by SOE. She struck her recruiter as "a smart businesswoman". The interviewer noted further, "It is clear that commerce is her first allegiance", but the authorities saw no reason to doubt her motives, while her pre-war life in Paris and her perfect French seemed to make her a natural for the job. She agreed to break off contact with Sussaix and began training.

Her preliminary training report described Leigh as supple, active and keen, confident and capable, "a very satisfactory person to teach" and one with "a very pleasant personality". Her commandant's report said she was "full of guts", had kept up with the men and was "about the best shot in the party". He found her "dead keen" and noted that she was greatly respected, had an "equable nature", and according to him was a "plumb woman for this work". One of her instructors later remembered that she had a hard time dealing with maps and diagrams, but was "extremely good with her fingers; she could do fiddling jobs with charges and wires and all that remarkably quickly and neatly". He speculated (correctly) that she might have been connected with the fashion business before the war. "She was very interested in clothes, and hated her hideous khaki uniform".

Leigh was 40 years old when she returned to France as Ensign Vera Leigh of the FANY, as it was common for such women to be nominally employed by the FANY while actually being SOE agents (as was Andrée Borrel and many other female SOE agents).

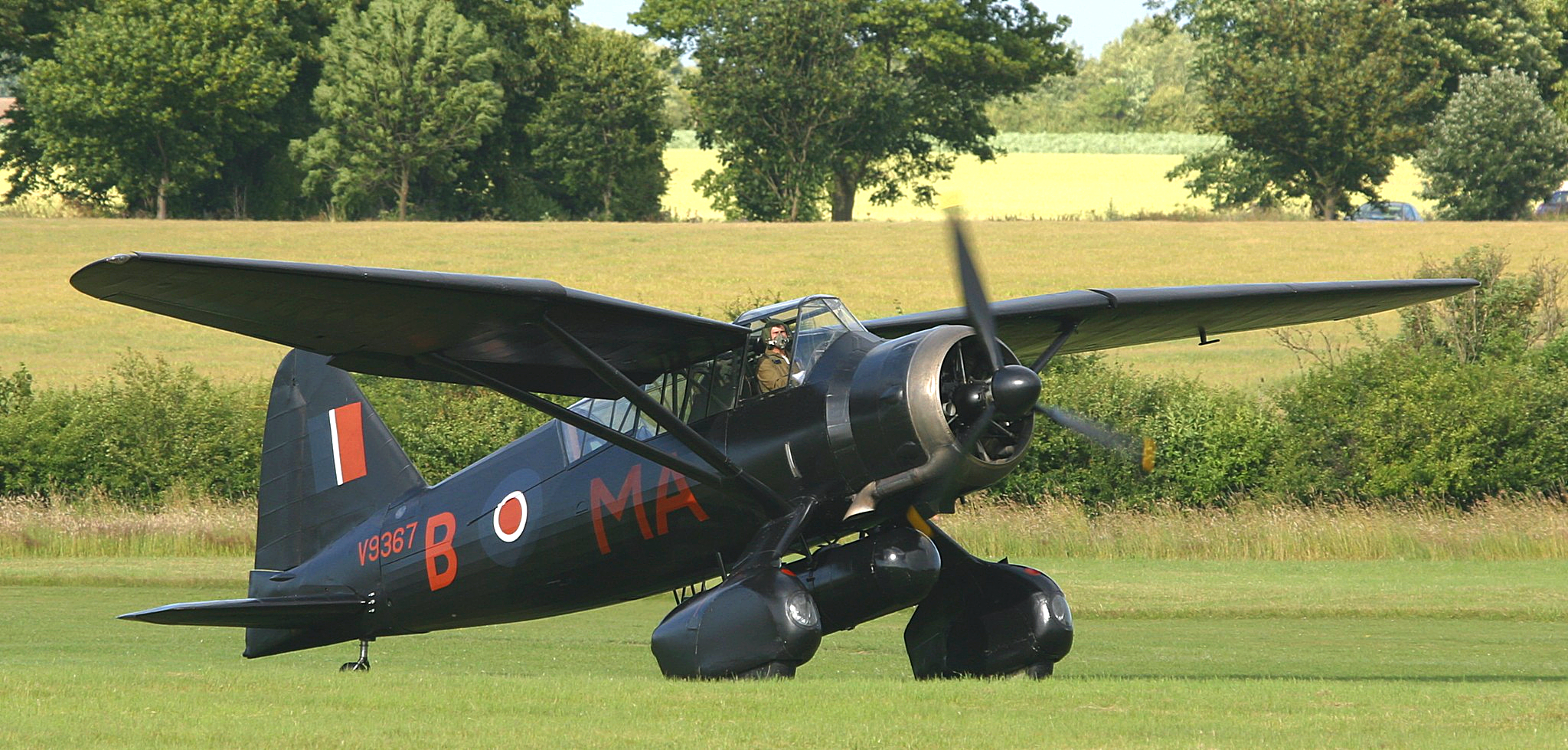
Westland Lysander Mk III (SD), the type used for special missions into occupied France during World War II.

Leigh returned to France on 13/14 May 1943, arriving in a Lysander at a field near Tours, and was one of four new arrivals that night who were received by F Section's air movements officer, Henri Déricourt. She arrived with Juliane Aisner (an old friend of Déricourt who would be a courier in his pick-up operation codenamed Farrier), Sidney Charles Jones (an organiser and arms instructor) and Marcel Clech (a W/T operator). Leigh was to be a courier and three of them (Leigh, Jones and Clech) were to form a sub-circuit known as Inventor, to work with the Paris-based Prosper circuit, and would later serve as the liaison officer of the Donkeyman circuit. Circuits were also known as networks.

Leigh's codename among fellow agents was Simone, and Almoner for radio communications with London; while her assumed identity in France was Suzanne Chavanne, a milliner's assistant. With papers in her assumed name, she moved around Paris and as far away as the Ardennes in the northeast, carrying messages from Jones to his various wireless operators and to Henri Frager (who headed a sub-circuit of the Prosper circuit). The reports she sent to her superiors in London were described as "extremely cheerful". She moved into an apartment in the elegant Sixteenth Arrondissement, made rendezvous routinely at cafés frequented by other agents, and took up life as a Parisienne again. Paris was remarkably calm under the German occupation with life continuing much as it had before despite rationing and the psychological stress many suffered in private, with few acts of resistance due to the savage reprisals the German invaders would inflict in response and the large number of Parisians willing to enrich themselves by becoming informants for the Gestapo. It caused Leigh to be less careful than she should have been, as evidenced by her decision to frequent the same hairdresser she had used before the war.

She came across her sister's husband and at first pretended not to know him, then threw her arms around him. This chance encounter led to the discovery that he, too, was involved in clandestine activity for the Allies by hiding fugitive Allied airmen and passing them on to an escape line that would try to get them over the Pyrenees across the frontier into Spain. In her spare time, she began escorting some of these downed fliers, who spoke no French, through the streets from the safe-house to their next point of contact on the escape line.

== Arrest and execution ==
=== Arrest ===
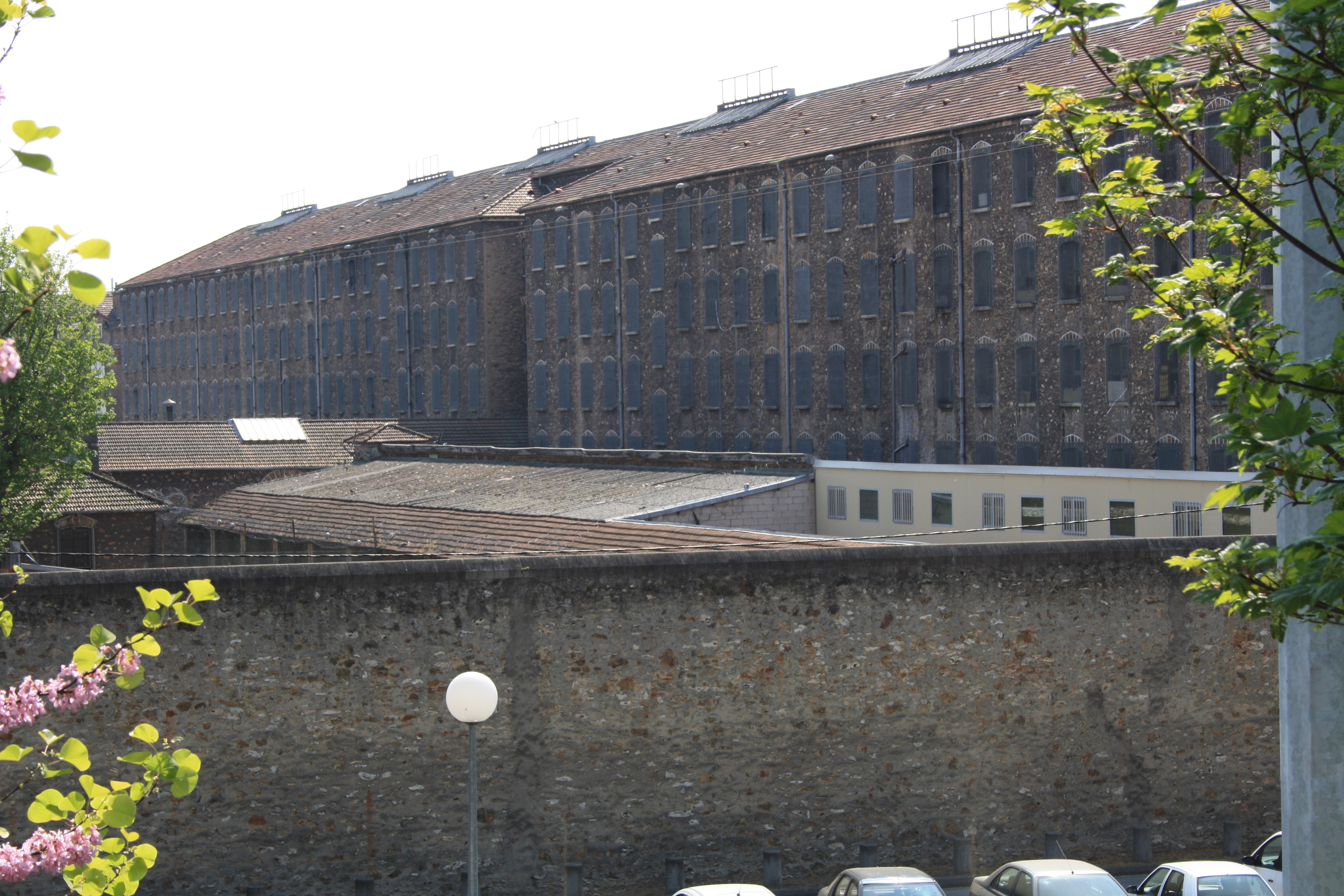
Fresnes Prison

She spent time with SOE agent Aisner in an imposing building in a courtyard off the Place des Ternes from which she ran her husband's business, an effective cover for Leigh's activity as Déricourt's courier. Leigh frequently met other agents at a café on the other side of the Place des Ternes, a short walk from the Place de l'Étoile in the Seventeenth. It was there in the Chez Mas, on 30 October 1943, in the company of Jones' bodyguard, that she was arrested. The INVENTOR network had been betrayed by double agent Roger Bardet, and subsequently collapsed. Taken to the Fresnes Prison several kilometres outside Paris, she was registered as Suzanne Chavonne and placed in Cell 410 of the Troisième Section Femmes. She had been taught in training to hold out for 48 hours after capture to give fellow agents a chance to vacate any premises and destroy any records she might be forced to reveal, but is almost certain she had no need to do so. There was nothing her captor didn't already know about her activities.

=== Moved to Germany ===
On 13 May 1944, Leigh together with three other captured female SOE agents, Andrée Borrel, Sonia Olschanezky and Diana Rowden, were moved from Fresnes to the Gestapo's Paris headquarters in the Avenue Foch along with four other women whose names were Yolande Beekman, Madeleine Damerment, Eliane Plewman and Odette Sansom, all of whom were F Section agents. Later that day, they were taken to the railway station, and each was handcuffed to a guard upon alighting the train. Sansom, in an interview after the war, said:

We were starting on this journey together in fear, but all of us hoping for something above all that we would remain together. We had all had a taste already of what things could be like, none of us did expect for anything very much, we all knew that they could put us to death. I was the only one officially condemned to death. The others were not. But there is always a fugitive ray of hope that some miracle will take place.

When the women arrived in Germany they were put into separate cells in the prison in Karlsruhe (Justizvollzugsanstalt Karlsruhe). The agents were treated no differently from other prisoners – markedly better than those in concentration camps – and were given manual work to do, peeling potatoes, sewing, etc., which helped pass the time. Occasionally, through the high bars, they could hear Allied bombers headed for targets within Germany, so on the whole, the situation looked promising for them, even if there was the possibility of dying in an air raid. They believed the war was coming closer to an end and they could reasonably expect to be liberated by the Allies before long.

=== Execution at Natzweiler-Struthof ===
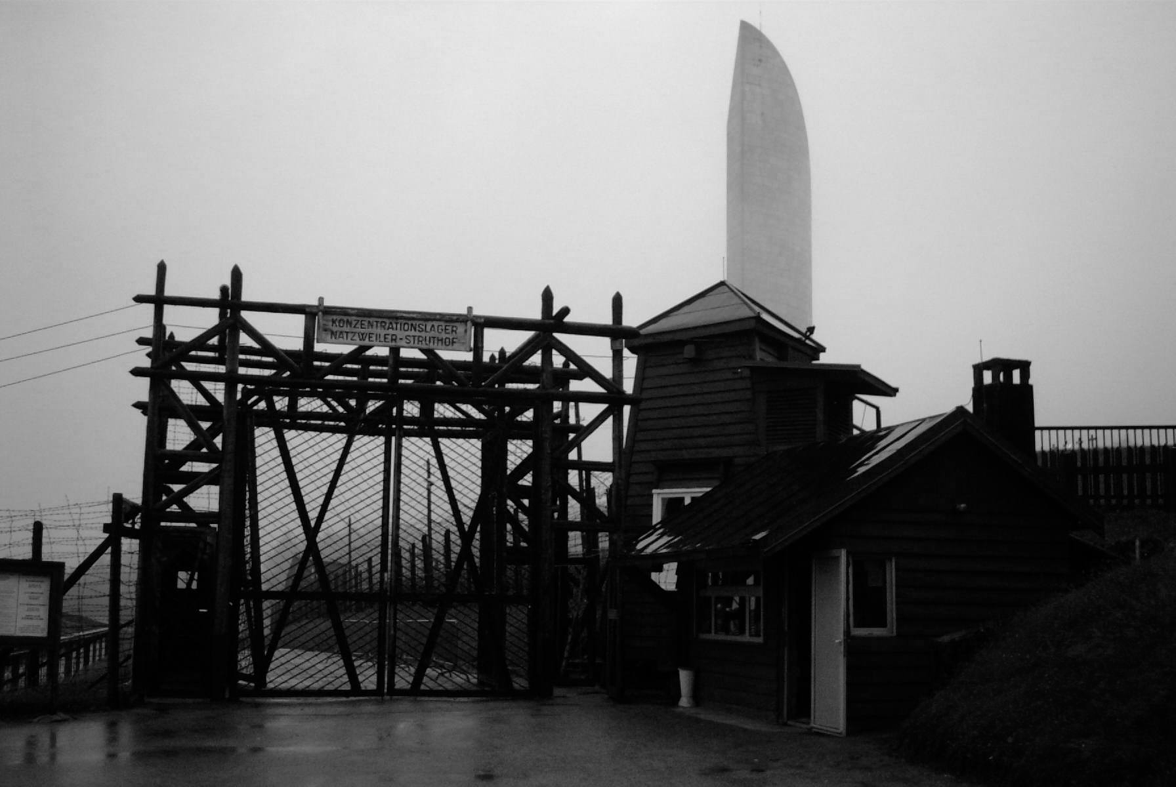
Natzweiler-Struthof camp entrance. Monument to the Departed in background.

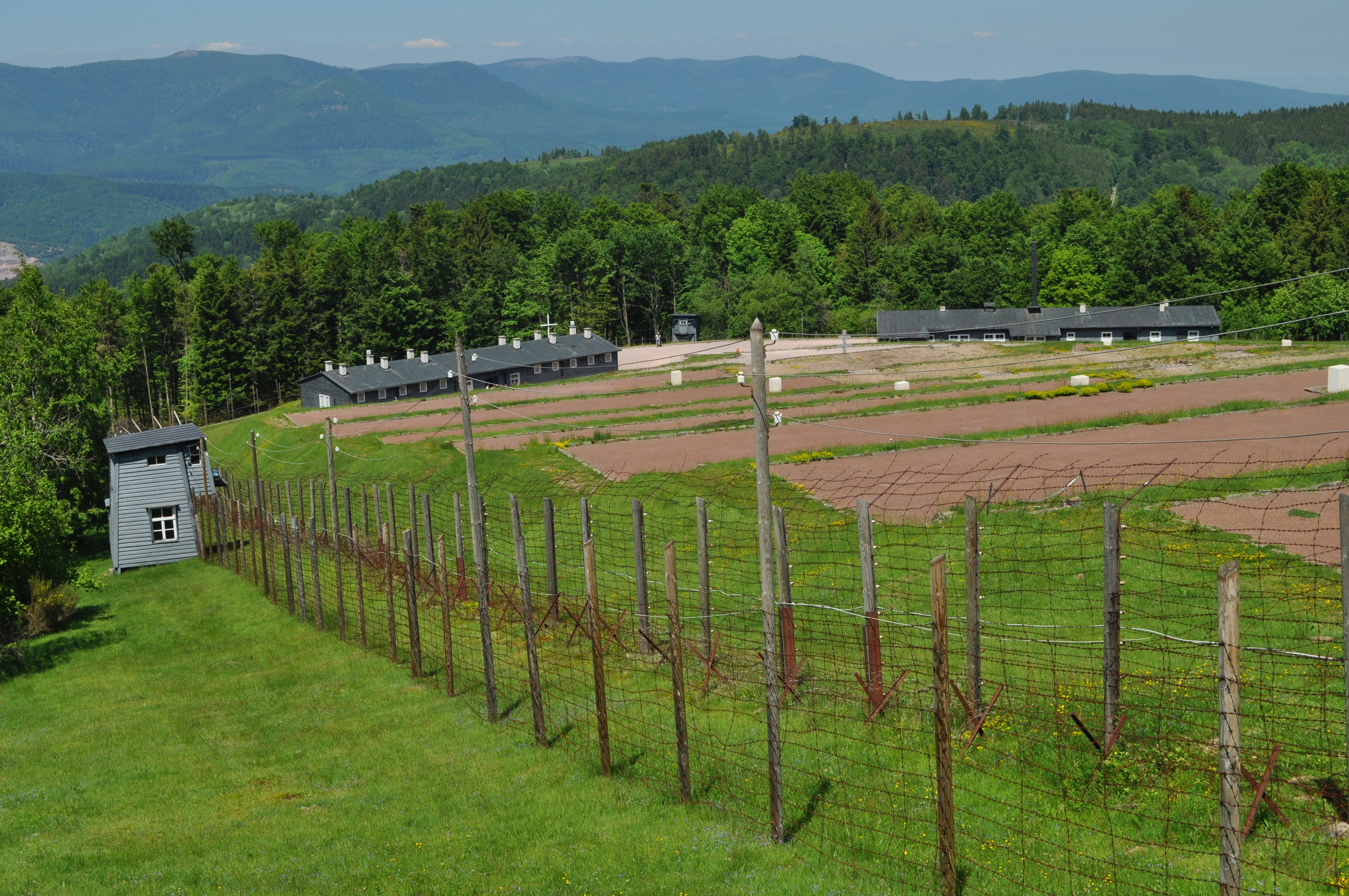
View of former Natzweiler-Struthof Concentration Camp in 2010. The cellblock is the building on the left and the crematorium is the building on the right.

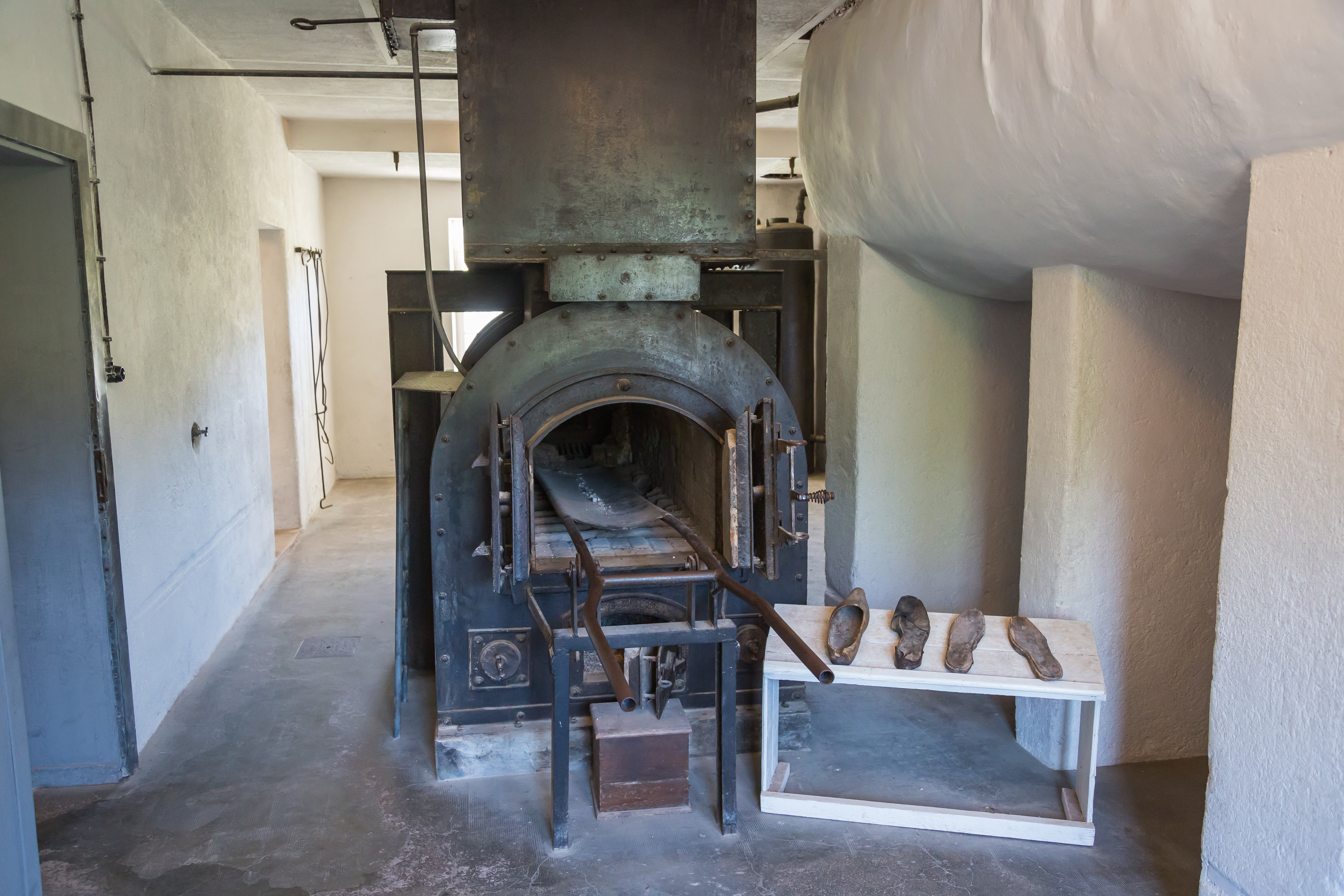
The crematorium at Natzweiler-Struthof

Some time between 5 and 6 a.m on 6 July 1944, not quite two months after their arrival in Karlsruhe, Borrel, Leigh, Olschanezky and Rowden were taken to the reception room, given their personal possessions, and handed over to two Gestapo men who then escorted them 100 kilometres south-west by closed truck to the Natzweiler-Struthof concentration camp in France, where they arrived around 3:30 p.m. The women's arrival was apparently unexpected as was the order by one of the women's escorts that the four women were to be executed immediately.

As women were a rarity in the camp, their presence immediately attracted attention from both German guards and prisoners. The four women were led through the center of the camp down to the cellblock at the bottom of the camp by SS men and held there until later that night. "One could see from their appearance that they hadn't come from a camp", said a French prisoner. "They seemed young, they were fairly well groomed, their clothes were not rubbish, their hair was brushed, and each had a case in their (sic) hand."

The four women were initially together but later put into individual cells. Through the windows, which faced those of the infirmary, they managed to communicate with several prisoners, including a Belgian prisoner, Dr Georges Boogaerts, who passed one of the women (whom he later identified as Borrel from a photograph) cigarettes through the window. Borrel threw him a little tobacco pouch containing some money.

Albert Guérisse, a Belgian army physician who had headed the Pat O'Leary escape line in Marseille, recognized Borrel as one of his former helpers. He exchanged a few words with another one of the women, who said she was English (Leigh or Rowden) before she disappeared into the cellblock building. At the post-war trial of the men charged with the execution of the four women, Guérisse stated that he was in the infirmary and had seen the women, one by one, being escorted by SS guards from the cellblock (Zellenbau) to the crematorium a few yards away. He told the court: "I saw the four women going to the crematorium, one after the other. One went, and two or three minutes later another went."

Inside the building housing the crematorium, each woman in turn was told to undress for a medical check and a doctor gave her an injection for what he told one of them was a vaccination against typhus, but was in fact a 10 cc dose of phenol, which the doctor believed was lethal. When the woman became unconscious after the injection, she was inserted into the crematorium oven. Guérrise said, "The next morning, the German prisoner in charge of the crematorium explained to me that each time the door of the oven was opened, the flames came out of the chimney and that meant a body had been put in the oven. I saw the flames four times."

The prisoner Guérisse referred to was Franz Berg, who assisted in the crematorium and had stoked the fire that night before being sent back to the room he shared with two other prisoners before the executions. The door was locked from the outside during the executions, but it was possible to see the corridor from a small window above the door, so the prisoner in the highest bunk was able to keep up a running commentary on what he saw. Berg said:

We heard low voices in the next room and then the noise of a body being dragged along the floor, and he whispered to me that he could see people dragging something along the floor which was below his angle of vision through the fanlight.

At the same time that this body was being brought past, we heard the noise of heavy breathing and low groaning combined.

…and again we heard the same noises and regular groans as the [next two] insensible women were dragged away.

The fourth, however, resisted in the corridor. I heard her say "Pourquoi?" and I heard a voice as I recognized as the doctor who was in civilian clothes say "Pour typhus". We then heard the noise of a struggle and the muffled cries of the woman. I assumed that someone held a hand over her mouth. I heard the woman being dragged away too. She was groaning louder than the others.

From the noise of the crematorium oven doors which I heard, I can state definitely that in each case, the groaning women were placed immediately in the crematorium oven.

When [the officials] had gone, we went to the crematorium oven, opened the door and saw that there were four blackened bodies within. Next morning in the course of my duties, I had to clear the ashes out of the crematorium oven. I found a pink woman's stocking garter on the floor near the oven.

More than one witness talked of a struggle when the fourth woman was shoved into the furnace. According to a Polish prisoner named Walter Schultz, the SS medical orderly (Emil Brüttel) told him the following: "When the last woman was halfway in the oven (she had been put in feet first), she had come to her senses and struggled. As there were sufficient men there, they were able to push her into the oven, but not before she had resisted and scratched [Peter] Straub's face." The next day, Schultz noticed that the face of the camp executioner (Straub) had been severely scratched.

The camp doctor (Werner Rohde) was executed after the war. Franz Berg was sentenced to five years in prison but received the death penalty in another trial for a different crime and was hanged on the same day as Rohde. The camp commandant (Fritz Hartjenstein) received a life sentence, while Straub was sentenced to 13 years in prison.

== Honours and awards ==
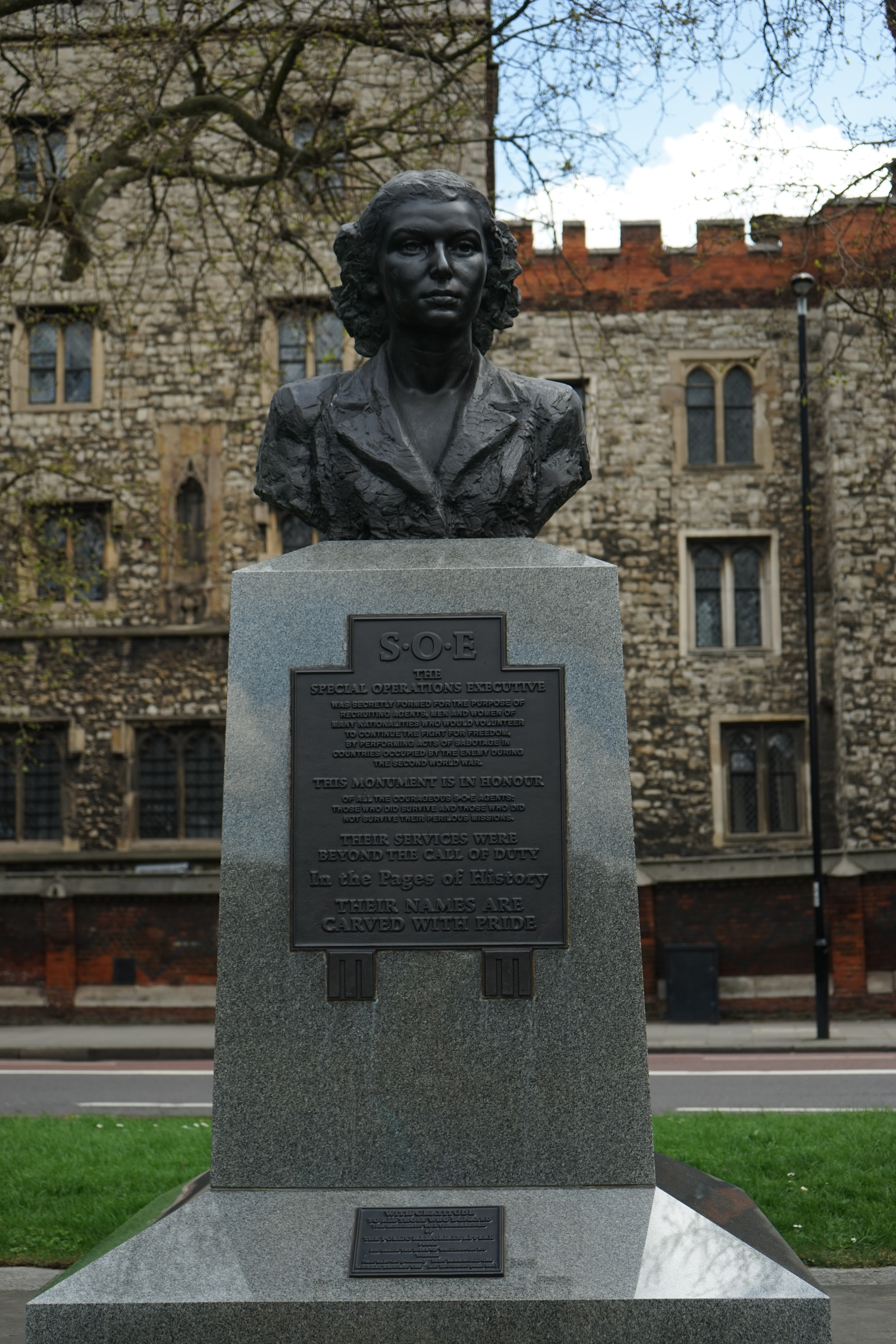
SOE Agents Memorial

Leigh posthumously received the King's Commendation for Brave Conduct. The concentration camp where she died is a now a French government historical site, where a plaque to Leigh and the three women who died with her is part of the Deportation Memorial on the site. As one of the SOE agents who died for the liberation of her country, Ensign Leigh is listed on the "Roll of Honor" on the Valençay SOE Memorial in the town of Valençay, in the Indre department of France. She is commemorated on the Tempsford Memorial in the village of Tempsford in the county of Bedfordshire in the East of England. A later memorial, the SOE Agents Memorial in Lambeth Palace Road (Westminster, London), is dedicated to all SOE agents. She is also commemorated in column 3 of panel 26 of the Brookwood Memorial as one of 3,500 "to whom war denied a known and honoured grave".

In 1985, SOE agent and painter Brian Stonehouse, who saw Leigh and the three other female SOE agents at the Natzweiler-Struthof concentration camp just before their deaths, painted a watercolour of the four women which now hangs in the Special Forces Club in London.

Leigh's name is one of those featured on the sculpture Ribbons, unveiled in 2024.

== Related cultural works ==
- Carve Her Name with Pride (1958)

Movie based on the book by R.J. Minney about Violette Szabo, starring Paul Scofield and Virginia McKenna.

- Churchill's Spy School (2010)

Documentary about the SOE "finishing school" on the Beaulieu estate in Hampshire.

- Les Femmes de l'Ombre (aka Female Agents) (2008)

French film about five SOE female agents and their contribution towards the D-Day invasions.

- Nancy Wake Codename: The White Mouse (1987)

Docudrama about Nancy Wake's work for SOE, partly narrated by Wake (Wake was disappointed that the film was changed from an 8-hour resistance story to a 4-hour love story).

- Now It Can Be Told (aka School for Danger) (1946)

Filming began in 1944 and starred real-life SOE agents Captain Harry Rée and Jacqueline Nearne codenamed "Felix" and "Cat", respectively. The film tells the story of the training of agents for SOE and their operations in France. The training sequences were filmed using the SOE equipment at the training schools at Traigh and Garramor (South Morar) and at Ringway.

- Odette (1950)

Movie based on the book by Jerrard Tickell about Odette Sansom, starring Anna Neagle and Trevor Howard. The film includes an interview with Maurice Buckmaster, head of SOE's F-Section.

- Robert and the Shadows (2004)

French documentary on France Télévisions. Did General De Gaulle tell the whole truth about the French resistance? This is the purpose of this documentary. Jean Marie Barrere, the French director, uses the story of his own grandfather (Robert) to tell the French what SOE did at that time. Robert was a French teacher based in the southwest of France, who worked with SOE agent George Reginald Starr (codenamed "Hilaire", in charge of the "Wheelwright" circuit).

- Wish Me Luck (1987)

Television series that was broadcast between 1987 and 1990 featuring the exploits of the women and, less frequently, the men of SOE, which was renamed the 'Outfit'.

== See also ==
- British military history of World War II
- Military history of France during World War II
- Resistance during World War II
