= Sonia Olschanezky =

French Resistance member

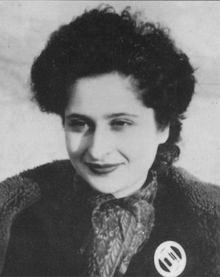
- Olschanezky during WW2
- Born: 25 December 1923; Chemnitz, Saxony, Germany
- Died: 6 July 1944 (aged 20); Natzweiler-Struthof, France
- Military career
- Allegiance: France
- Branch: French Resistance; Special Operations Executive
- Service years: 1940–1944
- Nicknames: Tania (SOE codename); Suzanne Ouvrard (SOE alias)
- Units: Juggler (SOE)
- Commands: Juggler circuit after the organizer (Jean Worms) was captured and the second in command (Jacques Weil) fled to Switzerland, while still serving as this circuit’s courier.
- Conflicts: Second World War

Sonia Olschanezky (25 December 1923 – 6 July 1944) was a member of the French Resistance and the Special Operations Executive during World War II. Olschanezky was a member of the SOE's Juggler circuit in occupied France where she operated as a courier until she was arrested by the Gestapo and was subsequently executed at the Natzweiler-Struthof concentration camp.

== Early life ==
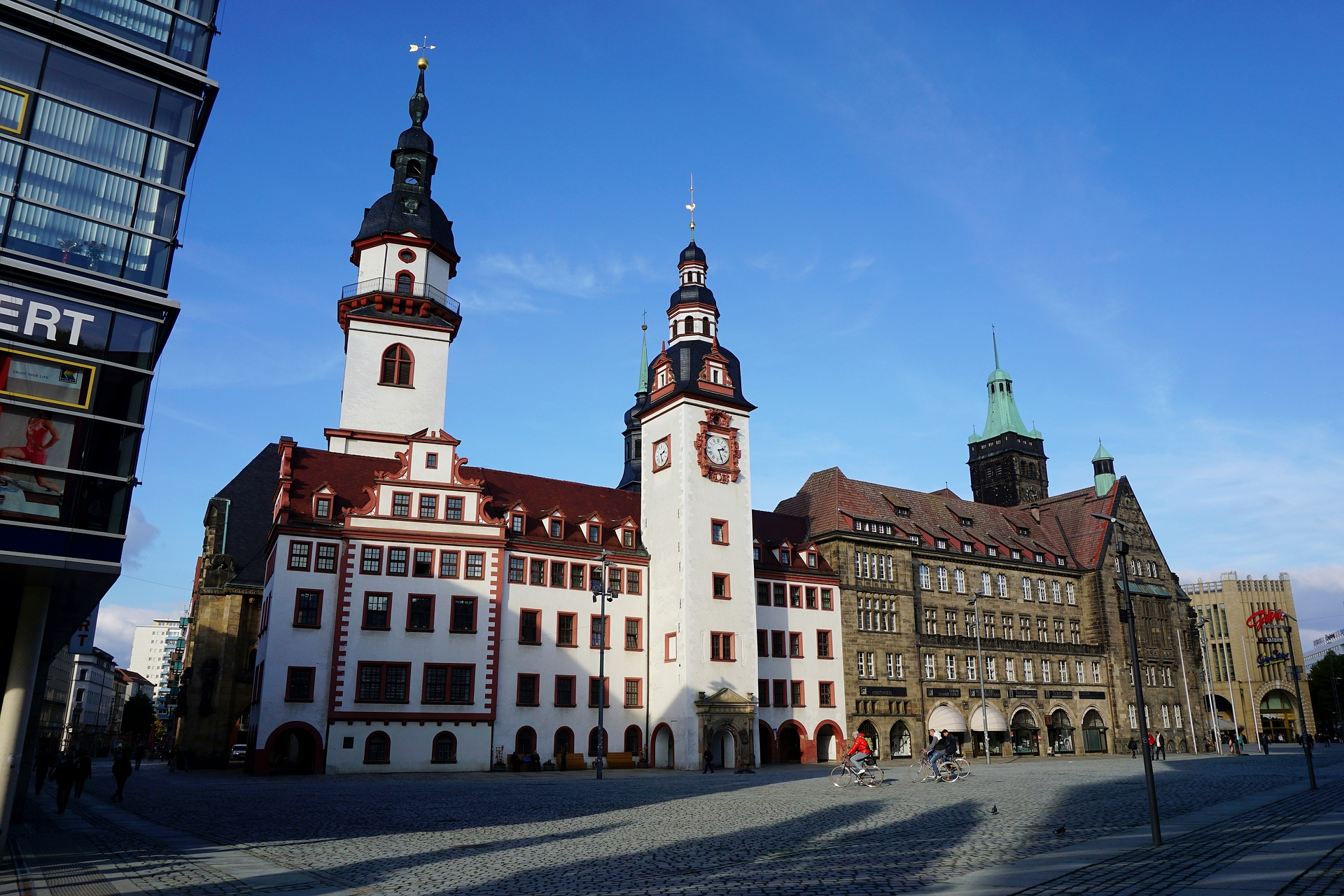
Old and new city hall in Chemnitz

Olschanezky was born in Chemnitz, Germany. Her father, Eli Olschanezky, was born in Odessa and came to Germany to study chemical engineering. He met Olschanezky's mother, Helene, at a dance given by the Jewish community in Leipzig. They were engaged on 1 August 1914, the day Germany declared war on Russia. Russian citizens in Germany were then subject to internment. Helene's father, a portrait painter from Minsk used his society contacts to arrange for Eli's release from internment after six months on condition that he report every week to the police station in Chemnitz. As an enemy alien, he was unable to work as a chemical engineer and took a job as a sales representative for a manufacturer of ladies' stockings.

In September 1916, Olschanezky's parents were married and set up house in Chemnitz where their three children were born. Enoch (25 September 1917 – 18 April 1944), Tobias (who later changed his name to Serge; March 1919) and Sonia (25 December 1923). The family lived a comfortable bourgeois life between the wars, with a chauffeur, a cook, and a governess for the children in their apartment on the Hellenenstrasse. As secular Jews, the Olschanezkys celebrated major Jewish holidays and contributed to Jewish charities including the Jewish National Fund.

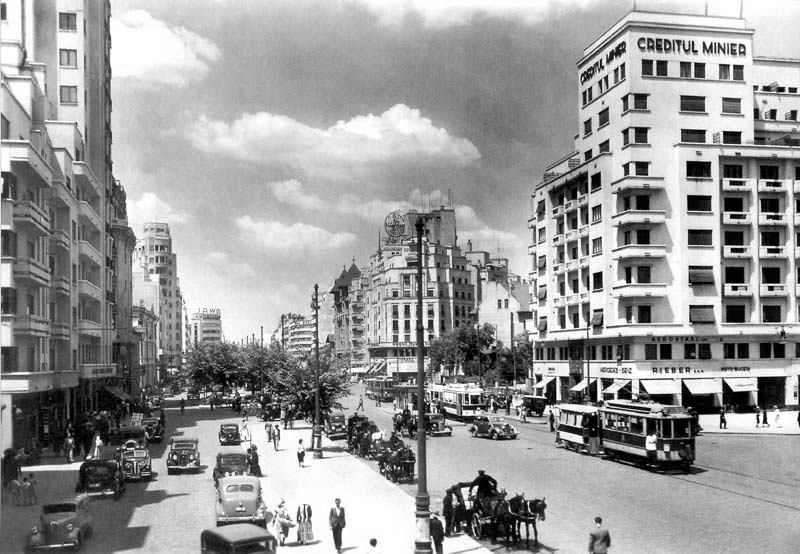
Bucharest in the 1930s.

In 1926 the family left Germany for Bucharest, where Eli Olschanezky had been invited to oversee the construction of, and then run, a factory producing silk stockings. After three years his partners stopped credit and the business failed, which resulted in the family villa and possessions being sold. The family moved to Paris in January 1930 and settled into a pension de famille in the Thirteenth Arrondissement. Eli Olschanezky tried to re-establish himself in business but found himself cheated of his money, which left him sick and demoralised, and the family moved to cheaper accommodation. Serge (formerly Tobias), then aged 15, left school and, along with his brother Enoch, got a job in a hotel.

In Paris, Olschanezky became a dance student, and when the manager of a children's theatre saw her in class one day she was asked to join the theatre company. Her parents said no at first, but she eventually won them over, and at the age of 10 she began performing with Le Théâtre du Petit Monde on Thursday afternoons, the school holiday. Through the influence of a distant relative she appeared on television in a demonstration of the new medium at the 1937 International Exposition in Paris. While still a schoolgirl, she worked as a performer, appearing at school dances and private affairs, using the professional name of Sonia Olys.

== Occupation and internment ==
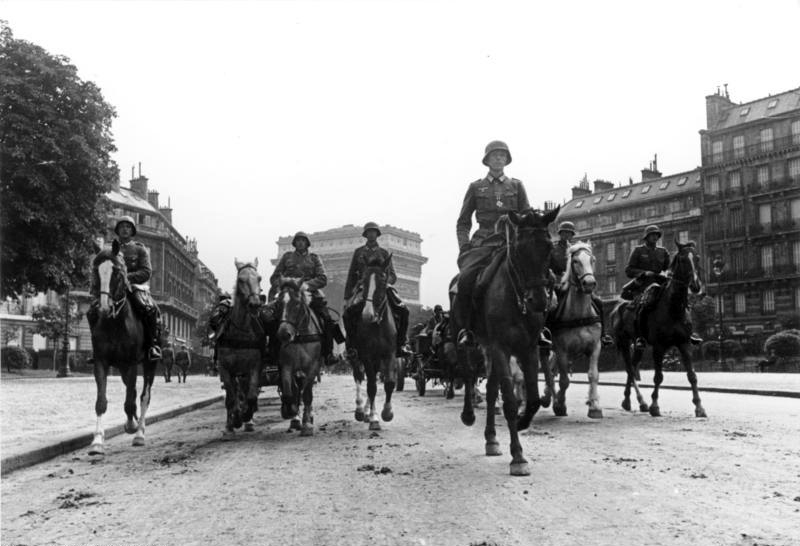
German troops in Paris (1940).

In May 1940, France was invaded by the German Army. After the French surrender, the new leader, Henri-Philippe Petain, cooperated in the persecution of the Jews in the country.

In May 1942, orders were given for all Jewish men, women and children to wear a six-pointed yellow star on their clothing. The following month, Olschanezky was arrested and sent to the Drancy deportation camp near Paris. Many of the prisoners in Drancy were subsequently sent to extermination camps operated by Nazi Germany.

Her mother contacted friends in Germany who managed to produce false papers that stated that Olschanezky had "economically valuable skills" needed for the war effort. On the production of the papers and the payment of money to a German official, Olschanezky was freed in the autumn of 1942. After her release she told her mother, that she felt she had to "do something to defend us. Others won’t do it for us. We must do it for ourselves." When her mother asked if she didn't think she had already lost enough, she replied that if everyone said that, no one would do anything. Through one of the families for whom she had worked, she met Jacques Weil, who would later become Olschanezky's fiancé, and found an opportunity to become a résistant.

== Special Operations Executive ==
Olschanezky was locally recruited by Jacques Weil to a small Jewish Juggler (also known as Robin) sub-circuit of SOE's Physician (also known as Prosper) circuit operating near Paris. The agents of Prosper circuit included Andrée Borrel (courier), Francis Suttill (organizer) and Gilbert Norman (W/T operator). Circuits were also known as networks. Olschanezky was stationed in Châlons-sur-Marne and spent much of her time as a courier between Châlons and their headquarters in the rue Cambon, near the Place de la Concorde, using the codename "Tania" and the alias "Suzanne Ouvrard". The long-awaited second-front in the form of a cross-channel invasion was expected in the 1943, and sabotage was stepped up through the spring.

One action in which Olschanezky took part succeeded in blowing up a munitions train at Melun, on the Seine south of Paris. To her mother and brothers she never denied the danger she was in. Her brother Serge said of her, "She was not one of those who reveled in it, she just accepted it." Serge escaped from a POW camp in Germany, with Enoch working for the Robin circuit. Enoch (25 September 1917 – 18 April 1944) was murdered at Auschwitz; no other details are known.

Unknown to London, Olschanezky had refused to follow Weill who had fled to Bern (Switzerland) in July 1943 after the arrest of the leader of Robin (Jean Alexandre Worms) following the collapse of Prosper the previous month, leaving her in charge of what was left of Robin and taking immense risks by running messages between different SOE groups that were likely compromised by this collapse.

== Arrest and execution ==
=== Arrest ===
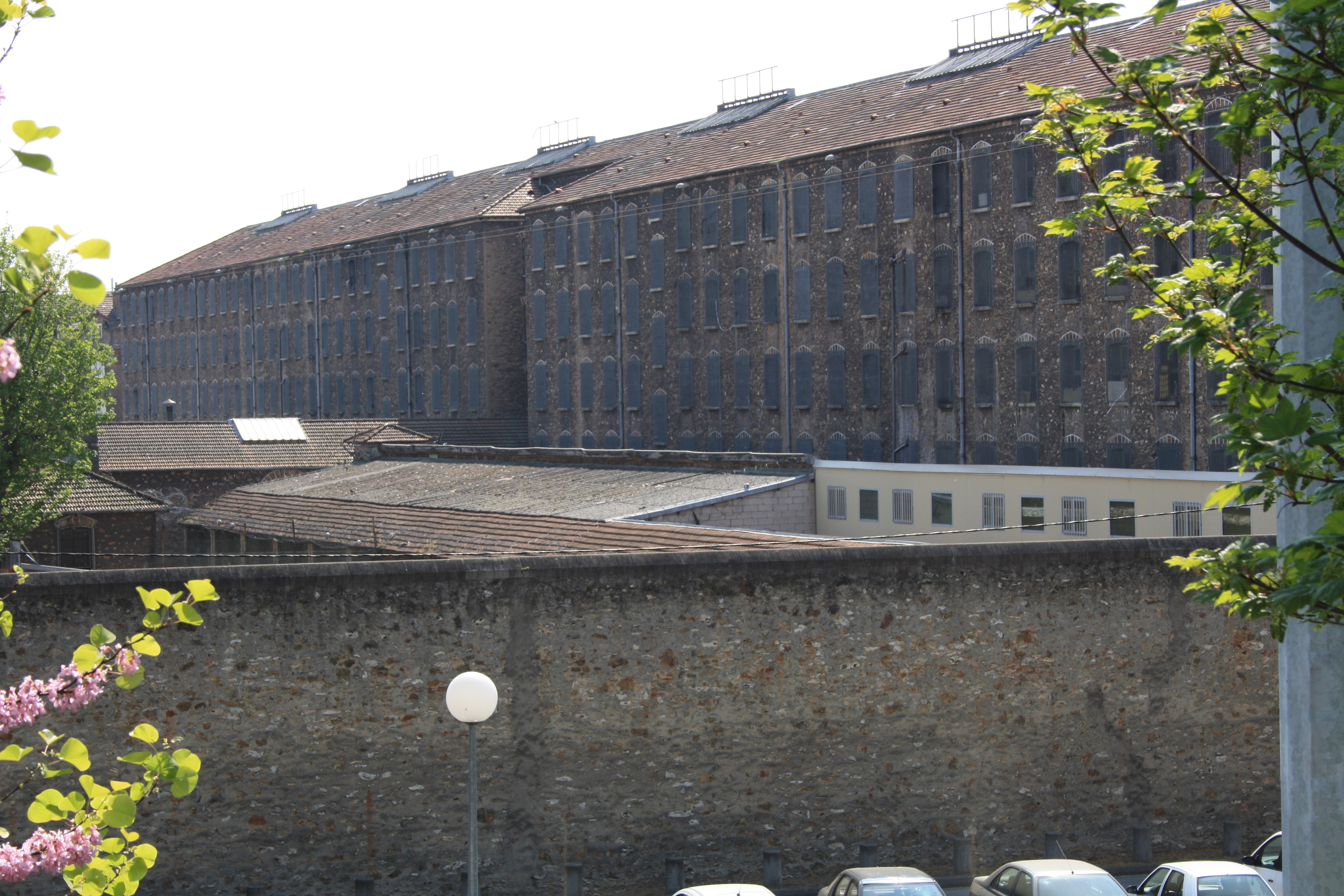
Fresnes Prison

Olschanezky remained free until her capture on 21 January 1944. After being interrogated by the Gestapo, she was imprisoned at Fresnes Prison. On 13 May 1944, Olschanezky together with three other captured SOE agents, Andrée Borrel, Vera Leigh and Diana Rowden, were moved from Fresnes to the Gestapo's Paris headquarters at 84 Avenue Foch along with Yolande Beekman, Madeleine Damerment, Eliane Plewman and Odette Sansom, all of whom were F Section agents. (Only Sansom would survive the war.) Later that day they were taken to the railway station, and each handcuffed to a guard on the train. Sansom, in an interview after the war, said:

We were starting on this journey together in fear, but all of us hoping for something above all that we would remain together. We had all had a taste already of what things could be like, none of us did expect for anything very much, we all knew that they could put us to death. I was the only one officially condemned to death. The others were not. But there is always a fugitive ray of hope that some miracle will take place.

The Germans transported Olschanezky and the seven other female agents – Beekman, Borrel, Damerment, Leigh, Plewman, Sansom, and Rowden – to a civilian prison for women in Karlsruhe prison where they were placed in separate cells. The agents were treated no differently from other prisoners and were given manual work. Occasionally, they could hear Allied bombers headed for targets within Germany as the war was apparently coming to its end and the prisoners could hope to be liberated in due course. There was some confusion as to what had happened to Olschanezky as she looked similar to another agent Noor Inayat Khan (Cinema circuit) who had also been arrested, and it was thought that Noor might have used Olschanezky's name as an alias.

=== Execution at Natzweiler-Struthof ===
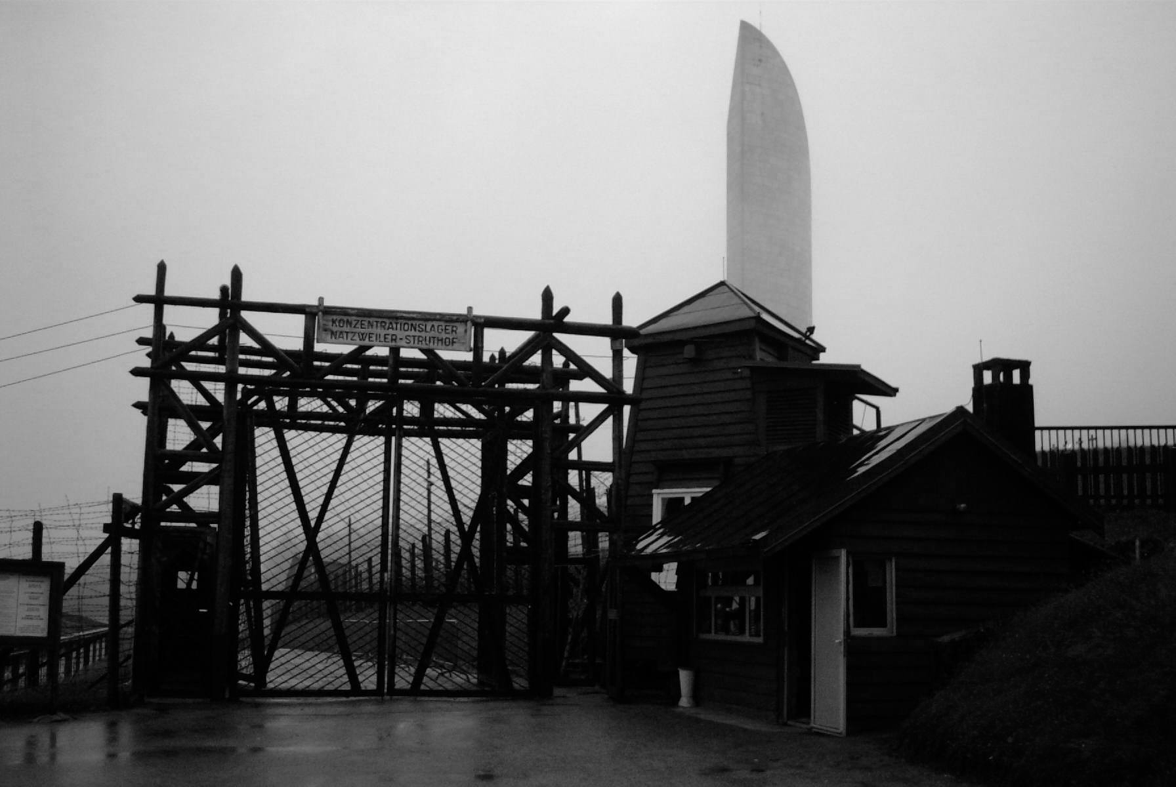
Natzweiler-Struthof camp entrance. Monument to the Departed in background.

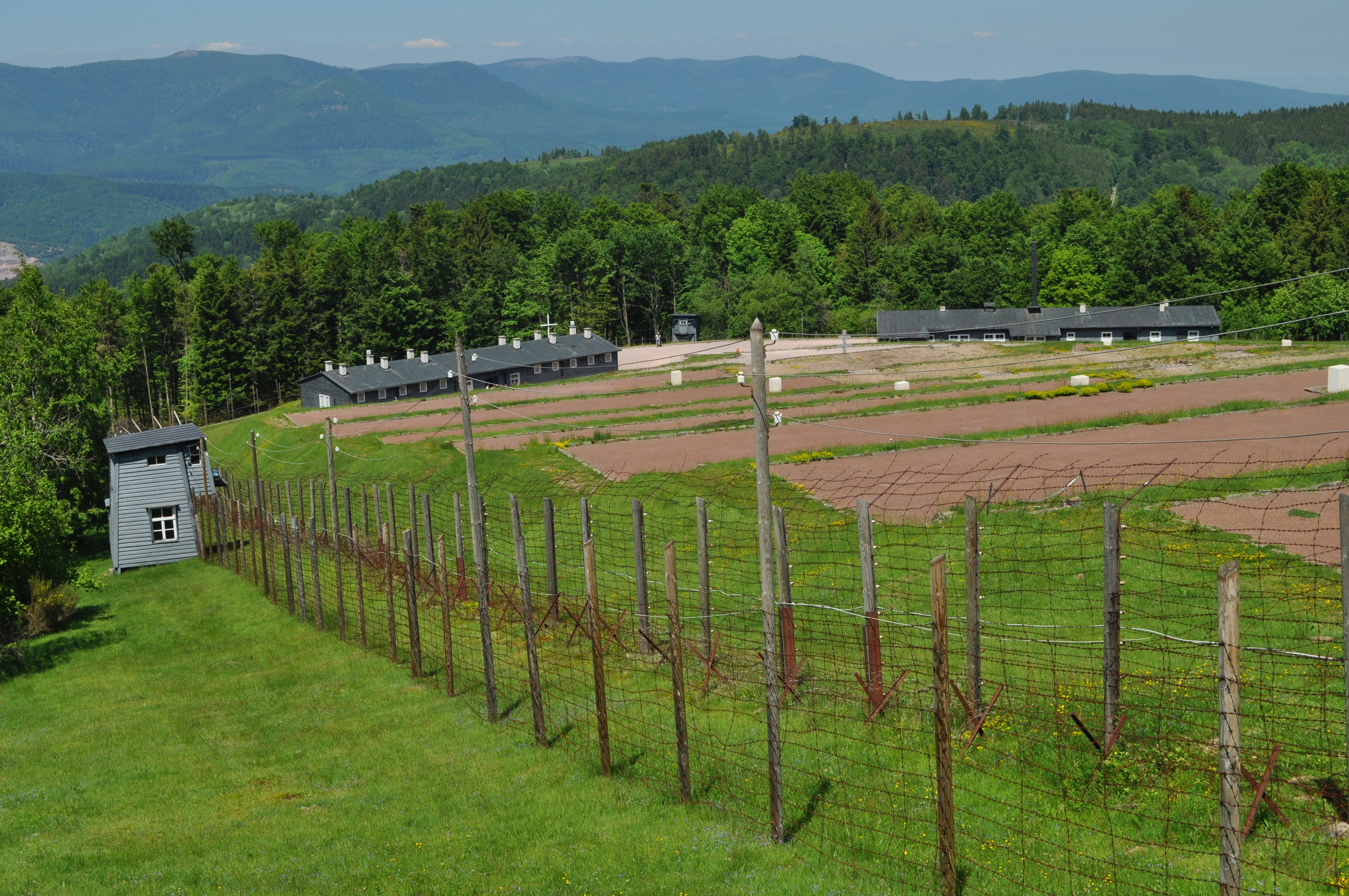
View of former Natzweiler-Struthof Concentration Camp in 2010. The cellblock is the building on the left and the crematorium is the building on the right.

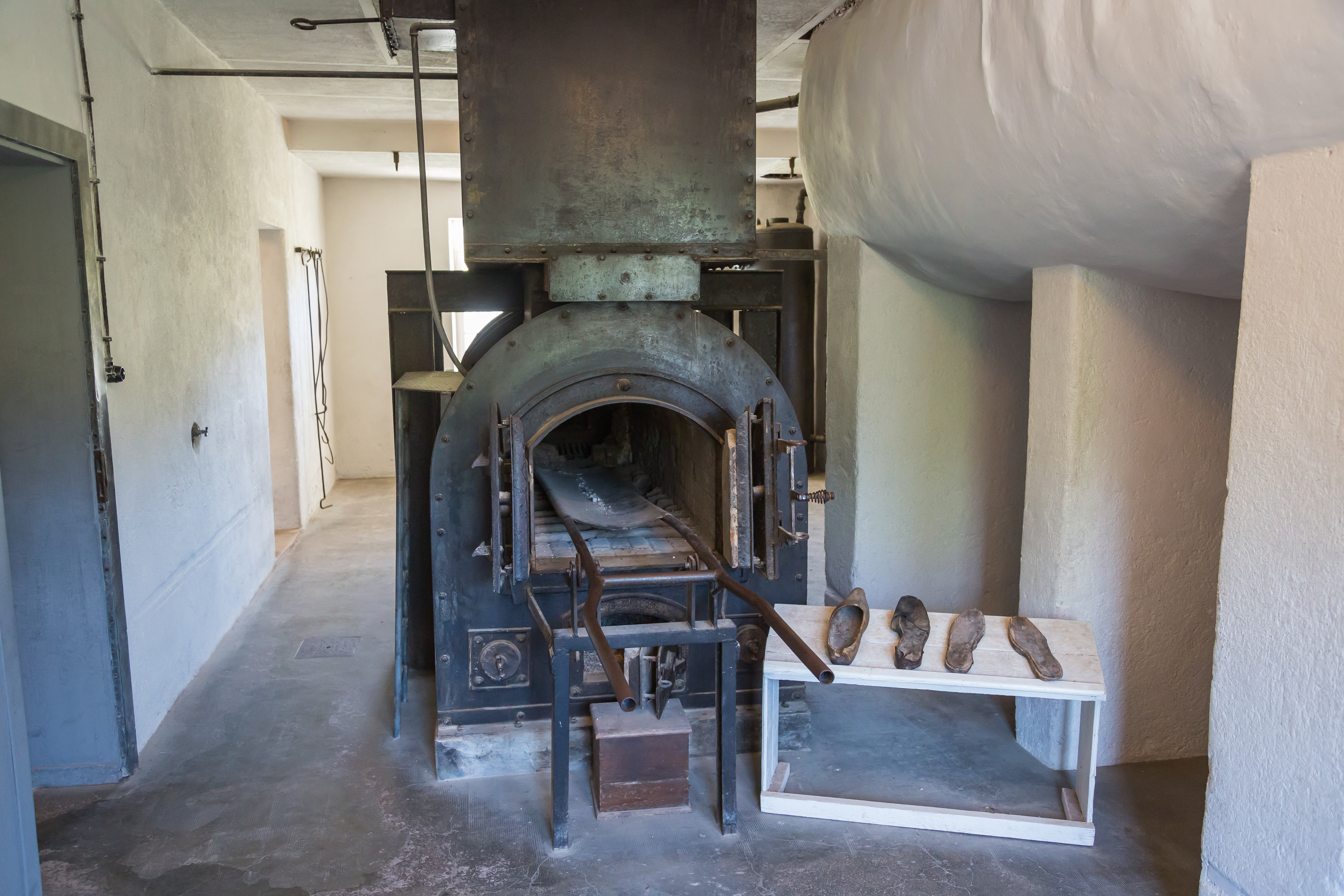
The crematorium at Natzweiler-Struthof

Some time between five and six in the morning on 6 July 1944, not quite two months after their arrival in Karlsruhe, Borrel, Leigh, Olschanezky and Rowden were taken to the reception room, given their personal possessions, and handed over to two Gestapo men who then escorted them 100 kilometres south-west by closed truck to the Natzweiler-Struthof concentration camp in France, where they arrived around three-thirty in the afternoon. The women's arrival was apparently unexpected as was the order by one of the women's escorts that the four women were to be executed immediately.

As women were a rarity in the camp their presence immediately attracted attention from both German guards and prisoners. The four women were led through the center of the camp down to the cellblock at the bottom of the camp by SS men and held there until later that night. "One could see from their appearance that they hadn't come from a camp," said a French prisoner. "They seemed young, they were fairly well groomed, their clothes were not rubbish, their hair was brushed, and each had a case in their (sic) hand."

The four women were initially together but later put into individual cells. Through the windows, which faced those of the infirmary, they managed to communicate with several prisoners, including a Belgian prisoner, Dr Georges Boogaerts, who passed one of the women (whom he later identified as Borrel from a photograph) cigarettes through the window. Borrel threw him a little tobacco pouch containing some money.

Albert Guérisse, a Belgian army physician who had headed the Pat O'Leary escape line in Marseille, recognized Borrel as one of his former helpers. He exchanged a few words with another one of the women, who said she was English (Leigh or Rowden) before she disappeared into the cellblock building. At the post-war trial of the men charged with the execution of the four women, Guérisse stated that he was in the infirmary and had seen the women, one by one, being escorted by SS guards from the cellblock (Zellenbau) to the crematorium a few yards away. He told the court: "I saw the four women going to the crematorium, one after the other. One went, and two or three minutes later another went."

Inside the building housing the crematorium, each woman in turn was told to undress for a medical check and a doctor gave her an injection for what he told one of them was a vaccination against typhus, but was in fact a 10cc dose of phenol which the doctor believed was lethal. When the woman became unconscious after the injection, she was inserted into the crematorium oven. Guérrise said, "The next morning the German prisoner in charge of the crematorium explained to me that each time the door of the oven was opened, the flames came out of the chimney and that meant a body had been put in the oven. I saw the flames four times." The door was locked from the outside during the executions, but it was possible to see the corridor from a small window above the door, so the prisoner in the highest bunk was able to keep up a running commentary on what he saw.

The prisoner Guérisse referred to was Franz Berg, who assisted in the crematorium and had stoked the fire that night before being sent back to the room he shared with two other prisoners before the executions. Berg said:

We heard low voices in the next room and then the noise of a body being dragged along the floor, and he whispered to me that he could see people dragging something along the floor which was below his angle of vision through the fanlight.

At the same time that this body was being brought past we heard the noise of heavy breathing and low groaning combined.

…and again we heard the same noises and regular groans as the [next two] insensible women were dragged away.

The fourth, however, resisted in the corridor. I heard her say "Pourquoi?" and I heard a voice as I recognized as the doctor who was in civilian clothes say "Pour typhus". We then heard the noise of a struggle and the muffled cries of the woman. I assumed that someone held a hand over her mouth. I heard the woman being dragged away too. She was groaning louder than the others.

From the noise of the crematorium oven doors which I heard, I can state definitely that in each case the groaning women were placed immediately in the crematorium oven.

When [the officials] had gone, we went to the crematorium oven, opened the door and saw that there were four blackened bodies within. Next morning in the course of my duties I had to clear the ashes out of the crematorium oven. I found a pink woman's stocking garter on the floor near the oven.

More than one witness talked of a struggle when the fourth woman was shoved into the furnace. According to a Polish prisoner named Walter Schultz, the SS medical orderly (Emil Brüttel) told him the following: "When the last woman was halfway in the oven (she had been put in feet first), she had come to her senses and struggled. As there were sufficient men there, they were able to push her into the oven, but not before she had resisted and scratched [Peter] Straub's face." The next day Schultz noticed that the face of the camp executioner (Straub) had been severely scratched.

The camp doctor (Werner Rohde) was executed after the war. Franz Berg was sentenced to five years in prison but received the death penalty in another trial for a different crime and was hanged on the same day as Rohde. The camp commandant (Fritz Hartjenstein) received a life sentence, while Straub was sentenced to 13 years in prison.

== Awards and honours ==
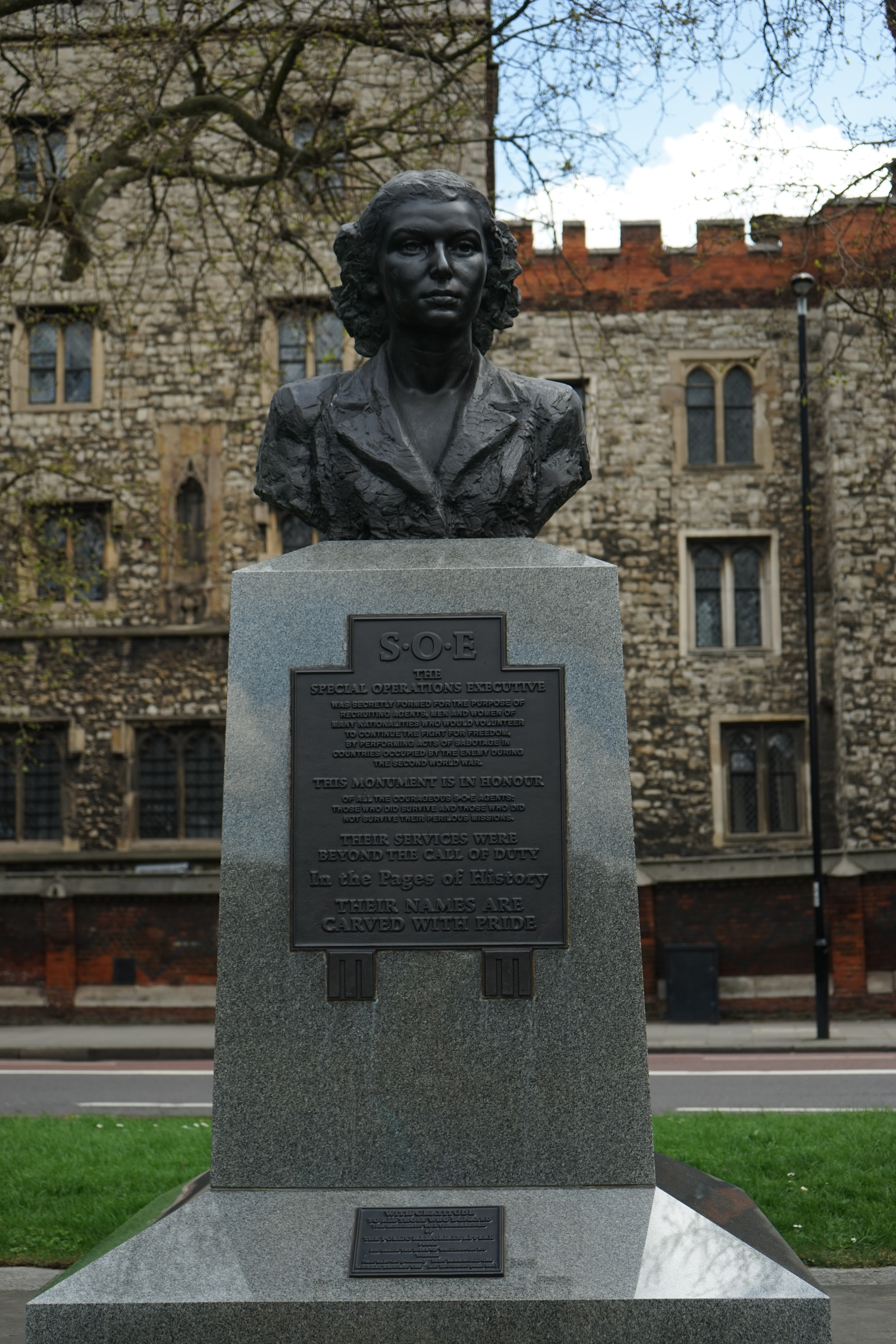
SOE Agents Memorial

In spite of the efforts of Vera Atkins (F Section's intelligence officer during the war), Olschanezky is not commemorated on the Valençay SOE Memorial in the Loire Valley, unveiled in 1991, which is dedicated to the 91 men and 13 women of F Section who were killed in action. Atkins was told by the memorial committee that Olschanezky was not eligible to be noted on the memorial as she was a locally recruited agent, not commissioned in the British armed forces. Nor was this German-born Jew honoured by the British or French governments with any medals or citations, despite her actions on behalf of these two nations.

A later memorial, the SOE Agents Memorial in Lambeth Palace Road, London, is dedicated to all SOE agents but does not list individual names, so is considered to include people like Olschanezky. Olschanezky is specifically commemorated with a plaque, along with the names of Noor Inayat Khan and Lilian Rolfe, on the Vera Atkins Memorial Seat in the Allied Special Forces Memorial Grove at the National Memorial Arboretum in Staffordshire. Her name is also on a stone plaque, along with the names of Diana Rowden, Andrée Borrel, and Vera Leigh, in the furnace room of the Natzweiler-Struthof crematorium.

In 1985, SOE agent and painter Brian Stonehouse, who saw Olschanezky and the three other female SOE agents at the Natzweiler-Struthof concentration camp just before their deaths, painted a poignant watercolour of the four women which now hangs in the Special Forces Club in London.

== Related cultural works ==
- Carve Her Name with Pride (1958)

Movie based on the book by R.J. Minney about Violette Szabo, starring Paul Scofield and Virginia McKenna.

- Churchill's Spy School (2010)

Documentary about the SOE "finishing school" on the Beaulieu estate in Hampshire.

- Les Femmes de l'Ombre (aka Female Agents) (2008)

French film about five SOE female agents and their contribution towards the D-Day invasions

- Now It Can Be Told (aka School for Danger) (1946)

Filming began in 1944 and starred real-life SOE agents Captain Harry Rée and Jacqueline Nearne codenamed "Felix" and "Cat", respectively. The film tells the story of the training of agents for SOE and their operations in France. The training sequences were filmed using the SOE equipment at the training schools at Traigh and Garramor (South Morar) and at Ringway.

- Odette (1950)

Movie based on the book by Jerrard Tickell about Odette Sansom, starring Anna Neagle and Trevor Howard. The film includes an interview with Maurice Buckmaster, head of SOE's F-Section.

- Robert and the Shadows (2004)

French documentary on France Télévisions. Jean Marie Barrere, the French director, uses the story of his own grandfather (Robert) to tell the French what SOE did at that time. Robert was a French teacher based in the southwest of France, who worked with SOE agent George Reginald Starr (codenamed "Hilaire", in charge of the "Wheelwright" circuit).

- Wish Me Luck (1987)

Television series that was broadcast between 1987 and 1990 featuring the exploits of the women and, less frequently, the men of SOE, which was renamed the 'Outfit'.

== See also ==
- British military history of World War II
- Military history of France during World War II
- Resistance during World War II
