= Yolande Beekman =

British SOE agent/wireless-operator (1911–1944)

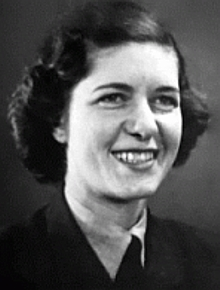
- In WAAF uniform during WW2.
- Born: 7 January 1911; Paris, France
- Died: 13 September 1944 (aged 33); Dachau concentration camp, Bavaria Nazi Germany
- Military career
- Allegiance: United Kingdom
- Branch: Special Operations Executive
- Service years: 1940-1944
- Rank: Ensign (Women's Auxiliary Air Force, WAAF)
- Nicknames: Mariette, Kilt (SOE codenames); Yvonne (SOE alias)
- Units: Musician (SOE)
- Conflicts: Second World War
- Awards: Croix de Guerre; Mentioned in Dispatches

Yolande Elsa Maria Beekman (7 January 1911 – 13 September 1944) was a British spy in World War II who served in the Women's Auxiliary Air Force (WAAF) and the Special Operations Executive. She was a member of SOE's Musician circuit in occupied France during World War II where she operated as a wireless operator until arrested by the Gestapo. She was subsequently executed at the Dachau concentration camp.

== Early life ==
Beekman was born Yolande Elsa Maria Unternährer to a Swiss father and an English mother in Paris. As a child, she moved to London and grew up fluent in English, German, and French. Young Yolande had a gentle disposition and liked to draw, so her family expected that she would become a designer or illustrator. After schooling in England she was sent to a Swiss finishing school.

== Wartime service ==
=== WAAF and SOE ===
When World War II broke out, Beekman joined the WAAF where she trained as a W/T operator. Because of her language skills and wireless expertise, Beekman was recruited by the SOE for work in occupied France, officially joining the SOE on 15 February 1943. She trained with Noor Inayat Khan and Yvonne Cormeau.

In 1943, Beekman married Sergeant Jaap Beekman of the Netherlands Army, whom she had met on the W/T operator's course, but a short time after her marriage she said goodbye to her husband and was flown behind enemy lines in France. Beekman was landed in France on the night of 17/18 September 1943, having been flown in a Double Lysander aircraft in operation Millner.

=== Lands in France ===
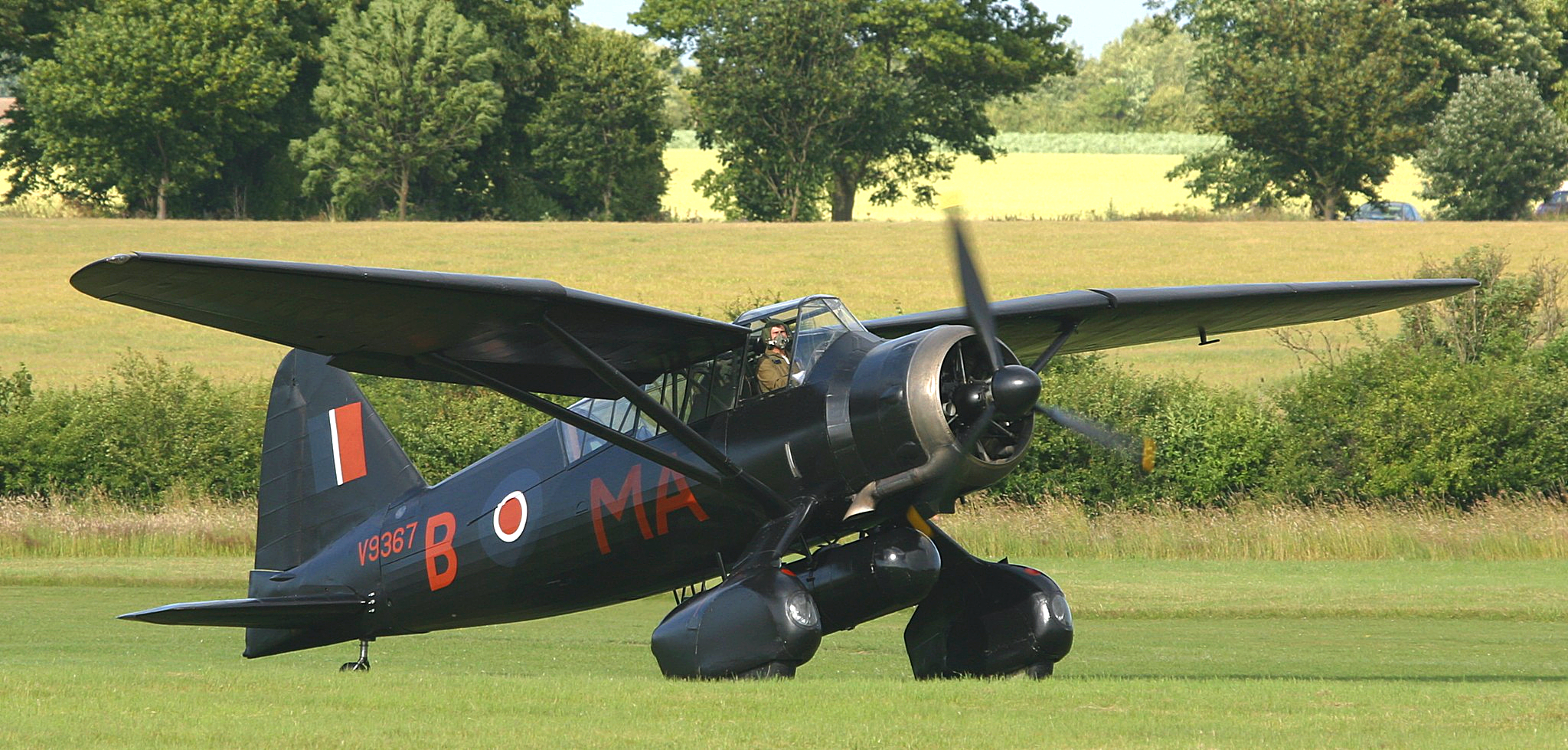
Westland Lysander Mk III (SD), the type used for special missions into occupied France during World War II

In France, Beekman operated the wireless for Gustave Biéler, the Canadian in charge of the Musician circuit at Saint-Quentin in the département of Aisne, using the codenames "Mariette" and "Kilt" (wireless codename), and the alias "Yvonne". She also transmitted messages for the adjacent Farmer network, headed by Michael Trotobas. Beekman became an efficient and valued agent who, in addition to her all important radio transmissions to London, took charge of the distribution of materials dropped by Allied planes.

Beekman's first lodgings were with a long serving résistant and schoolmistress, Mlle Lefevre, but this could only be a temporary stay. At the beginning of October, she moved to the house of Camille Boury, who worked at the Pharmacie Corteel, and lived on the corner of Rue Baudelaire. Odette Gobeaux, who worked with Boury at the pharmacy, offered Beekman the draughty attic of her house from which to transmit.

Beekman began quietly visiting Gobeaux's house in Rue de la Fère, letting herself in with her own key during the day, placing her set on a small table and passing the long aerial out through the window above. Interviewed after the war, Gobeaux remembered Beekman often waiting for the next transmission, lying on a divan with her head in a book, apparently unruffled by the possibility of arrest. Eugène Cordelette, one of MUSICIAN's lieutenants, later described Bieler and Beekman as being "both of the finest stuff imaginable", but her training should have left her more mindful of security.

Following her instructions from London, Beekman transmitted using a pre‐arranged schedule (or "sked"), sending messages at specific times and frequencies three times a week. This was standard practice for SOE wireless operators in France, though most would try and set up several sets at different safe houses, switching between them to avoid detection (some safety improvements such as more flexible transmission skeds were introduced only after Beekman was sent to France). Operating from a single static radio post greatly increased the chances of being hunted down by German direction finding (D/F) teams, which were known to prowl the streets of major towns and cities across the country, and it is not clear why Beekman apparently did not use additional hideouts – perhaps it was too difficult to find suitable locations in such a densely populated area, or she might have had technical problems with the wireless sets available.

Beekman's steadfast and fearless approach had proved invaluable to the circuit, but her work was becoming riskier every day. German interception of radio signals had become very efficient by this time, and the regular times of her transmissions was helping her pursuers to gradually narrow down the area of the source. Beekman and Bieler spent Christmas Eve at the Bourys' house; they listened to the BBC and did their best to be festive. On Christmas Day she made contact with London as usual, but the following week a direction finding van was seen passing the house, an ominous sign that the net was closing in. Beekman moved her set to the Boury house, where she was still living, but on 12 January Camille Boury noticed a man walking along the street, with his collar turned up and apparently listening to earphones. Beekman's radio signal had been traced to their block.

Beekman immediately packed up her set and moved again, this time to the Café Moulin Brulé, a lonely safe house on the north eastern edge of the city, on the northern bank of the canal. Shaken by her narrow escape, she could rely on the café owners sheltering her for the night.

== Arrest and execution ==
=== Arrest ===
The next day, on the morning of 14 January 1944, Biéler arrived at the café to discuss where she should go next, but the Gestapo were now ready to make their haul. Two men walked in and drew revolvers, arresting all those inside.

=== Prison ===
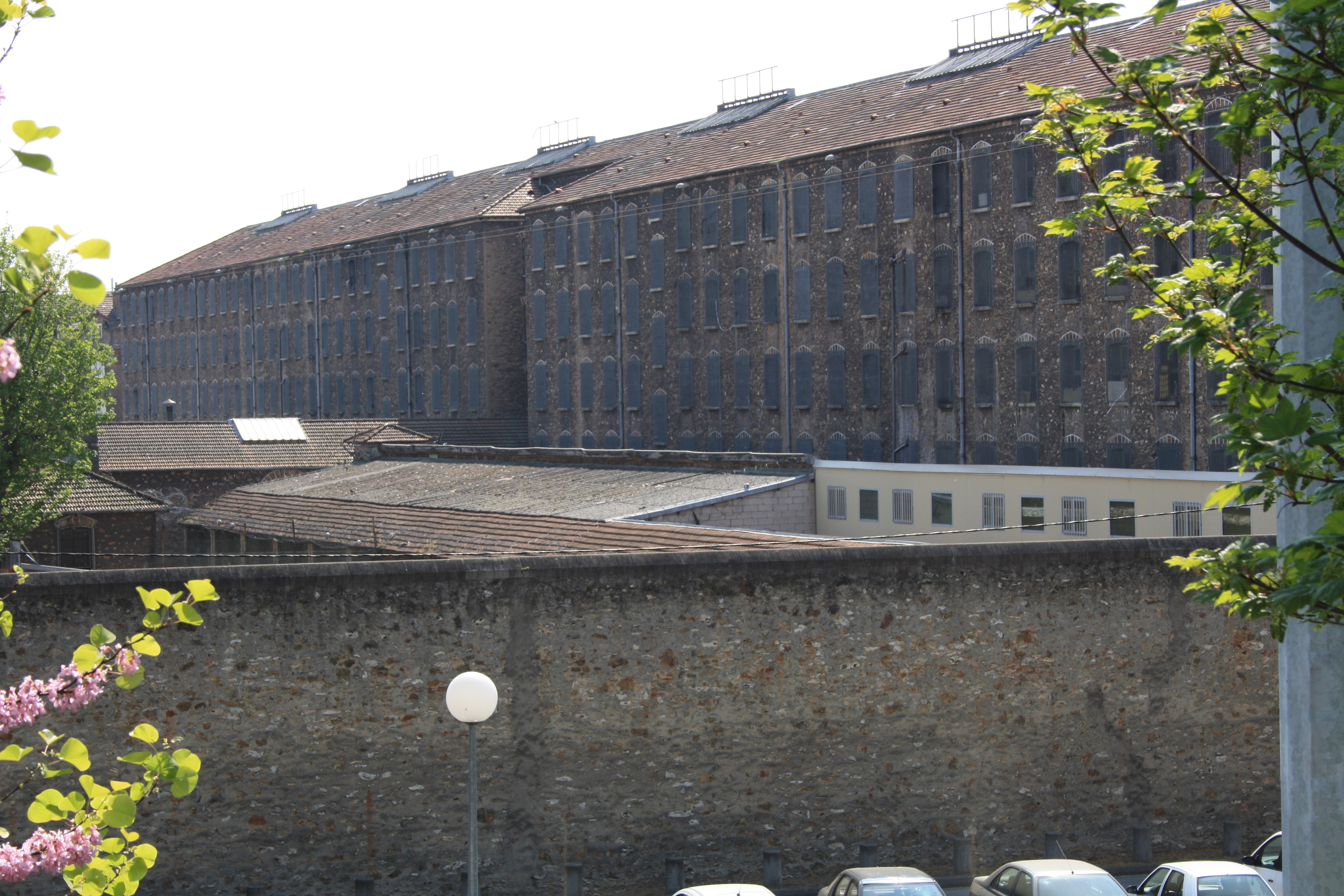
Fresnes Prison

Separated from Biéler, who was later executed, Beekman was transported to Fresnes Prison several kilometres outside Paris. Again she was interrogated and brutalized repeatedly. In May 1944, Beekman was moved with several other captured SOE agents to the civilian prison for women at Karlsruhe in Germany, where she encountered a prisoner named Hedwig Müller (a nurse arrested by the Gestapo in 1944). Müller said after the war that Beekman "didn't leave her cell much as she suffered badly with her legs." She was confined there until September 1944, sharing a cell with Elise Johe (a Jehovah's Witness), Annie Hagen (arrested for working as a black marketeer) and Clara Frank (jailed for slaughtering a cow on her family farm without permission). While imprisoned, Beekman drew and embroidered. She would take a needle and prick her finger to use the blood as ink and draw on toilet paper as there was no paper and pencils.

=== Execution at Dachau ===
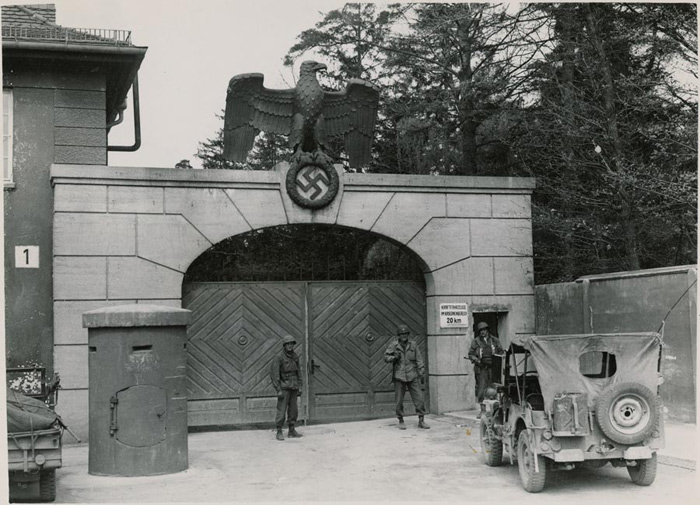
US troops guarding main entrance to Dachau after liberation, 1945.

Beekman was abruptly transferred to Dachau concentration camp with fellow agents Madeleine Damerment, Noor Inayat Khan, and Eliane Plewman. At dawn on the following morning, 13 September, the four women were executed by Wilhelm Ruppert.

A Gestapo man named Max Wassmer was in charge of prisoner transports at Karlsruhe and accompanied the women to Dachau. Another Gestapo man named Christian Ott gave a statement to American investigators after the war as to the fate of Beekman and her three companions. Ott was stationed at Karlsruhe and volunteered to accompany the four women to Dachau as he wanted to visit his family in Stuttgart on the return journey. Though not present at the execution, Ott told investigators what Wassmer had told him.

The four prisoners had come from the barrack in the camp, where they had spent the night, into the yard where the shooting was to be done. Here he [Wassmer] had announced the death sentence to them. Only the Lagerkommandant and the two SS men had been present. The German-speaking Englishwoman (the major) had told her companion of this death sentence. All four had grown very pale and wept; the major asked whether they could protest against the sentence. The Kommandant declared that no protest could be made against the sentence. The major had then asked to see a priest. The camp Kommandant refused this on the grounds that there was no priest in the camp.

The four prisoners now had to kneel with their heads towards a small mound of earth and were killed by the two SS, one after another by a shot through the back of the neck. During the shooting the two Englishwomen held hands and the two French-women likewise. For three of the prisoners the first shot caused death, but for the German-speaking Englishwoman [Beekman] a second shot had to be fired as she still showed signs of life after the first shot.

After the shooting of these prisoners the Lagerkommandant said to the two SS men that he took a personal interest in the jewellery of the women and that this should be taken into his office.

== Awards and honours ==
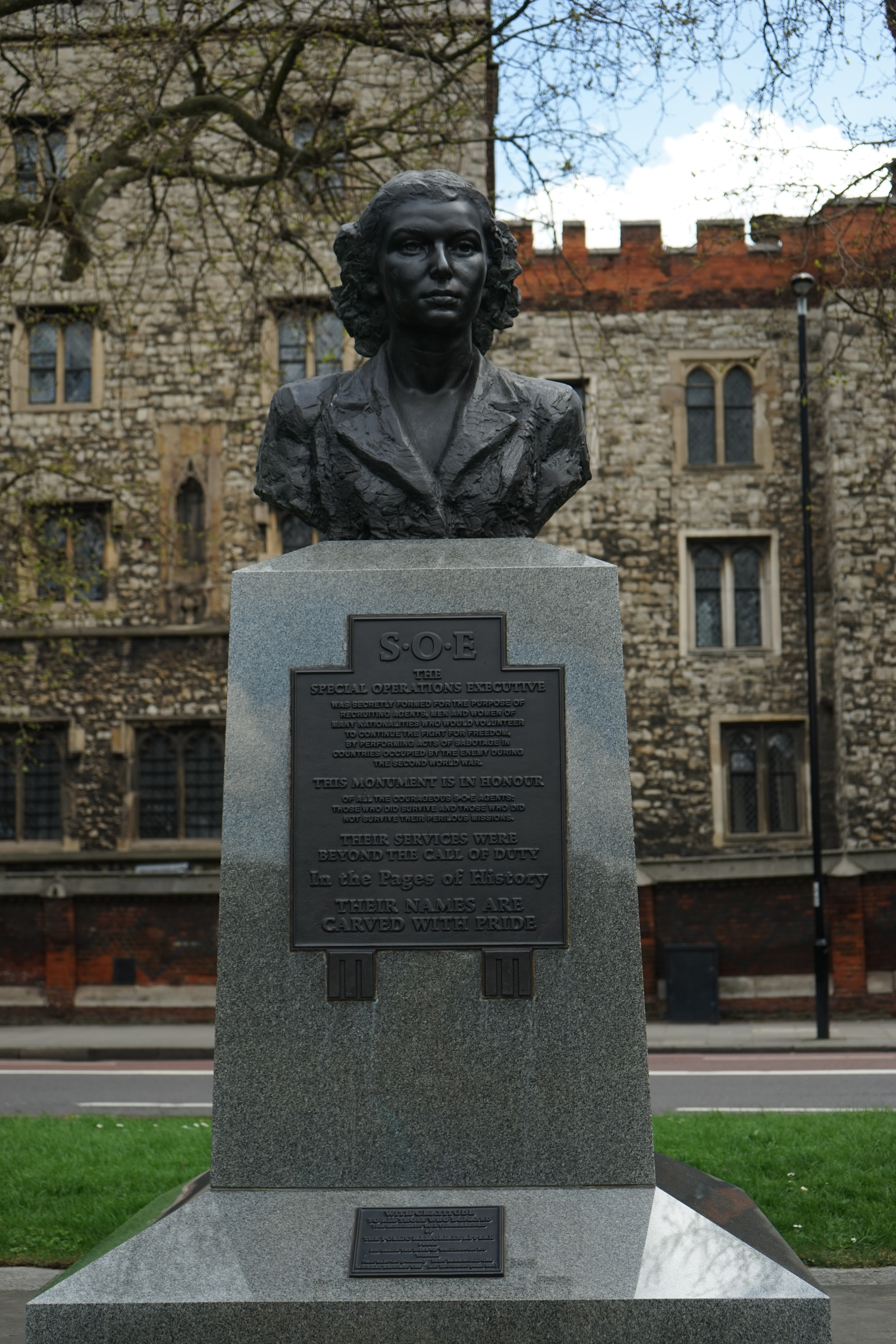
SOE Agents Memorial

Beekman's actions were recognized by the government of France with the posthumous awarding of the Croix de Guerre. In addition, she is recorded on the Runnymede Memorial in Surrey, England and as one of the SOE agents who died for the liberation of France, she is listed on the "Roll of Honour" on the Valençay SOE Memorial in the town of Valençay, in the Indre département of France. A later memorial, the SOE Agents Memorial in Lambeth Palace Road (Westminster, London), is dedicated to all SOE agents.

== Related cultural works ==
- Carve Her Name with Pride (1958)

Movie based on the book by R.J. Minney about Violette Szabo, starring Paul Scofield and Virginia McKenna.

- Churchill's Spy School (2010)

Documentary about the SOE "finishing school" on the Beaulieu estate in Hampshire.

- Les Femmes de l'Ombre (aka Female Agents) (2008)

French film about five SOE female agents and their contribution towards the D-Day invasions.

- Nancy Wake Codename: The White Mouse (1987)

Docudrama about Nancy Wake's work for SOE, partly narrated by Wake (Wake was disappointed that the film was changed from an 8-hour resistance story to a 4-hour love story).

- Now It Can Be Told (aka School for Danger) (1946)

Filming began in 1944 and starred real-life SOE agents Captain Harry Rée and Jacqueline Nearne codenamed "Felix" and "Cat", respectively. The film tells the story of the training of agents for SOE and their operations in France. The training sequences were filmed using the SOE equipment at the training schools at Traigh and Garramor (South Morar) and at Ringway.

- Odette (1950)

Movie based on the book by Jerrard Tickell about Odette Sansom, starring Anna Neagle and Trevor Howard. The film includes an interview with Maurice Buckmaster, head of SOE's F-Section.

- Robert and the Shadows (2004)

French documentary on France Télévisions. Did General De Gaulle tell the whole truth about the French resistance? This is the purpose of this documentary. Jean Marie Barrere, the French director, uses the story of his own grandfather (Robert) to tell the French what SOE did at that time. Robert was a French teacher based in the southwest of France, who worked with SOE agent George Reginald Starr (codenamed "Hilaire", in charge of the "Wheelwright" circuit).

- Wish Me Luck (1987)

Television series that was broadcast between 1987 and 1990 featuring the exploits of the women and, less frequently, the men of SOE, which was renamed the 'Outfit'.

== See also ==
- British military history of World War II
- Military history of France during World War II
- Resistance during World War II
