= Madeleine Damerment =

French resistance (1917–1944)

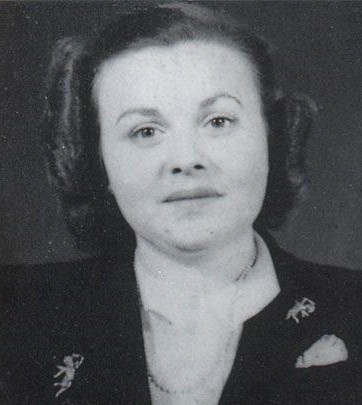
- Damerment during World War II.
- Born: 11 November 1917; Lille, France
- Died: 13 September 1944 (aged 26); Dachau concentration camp, Bavaria Nazi Germany
- Military career
- Allegiance: France, Britain
- Branch: French Resistance; Special Operations Executive
- Service years: 1943–1944 (SOE)
- Rank: Ensign (nominally for FANY while actually an SOE agent)
- Nicknames: Martine Dussautoy, Solange, Dancer, (SOE codenames)
- Units: Bricklayer (SOE)
- Conflicts: Second World War
- Awards: Légion d'honneur Croix de Guerre; Médaille de la Résistance; King's Commendation for Brave Conduct

Madeleine Zoe Damerment (11 November 1917 – 13 September 1944) was a French agent of the United Kingdom's clandestine Special Operations Executive (SOE) organization during World War II. The purpose of SOE was to conduct espionage, sabotage, and reconnaissance in countries occupied by the Axis powers, especially Nazi Germany. SOE agents allied themselves with resistance groups and supplied them with weapons and equipment parachuted in from England. Damerment was first involved in escape lines helping downed allied airmen escape occupied France. She fled France in March 1942 to avoid arrest. After arriving in Britain, she was recruited by the SOE. Damerment was to be a courier for SOE's Bricklayer circuit but was captured by the Gestapo on 29 February 1944 upon arrival in France. The Gestapo knew she was coming because they had captured SOE radios and were reading SOE radio messages. She was subsequently executed at the Dachau concentration camp on 13 September 1944 along with three other female SOE agents.

== Early life ==
Damerment was born in Tortefontaine, Pas-de-Calais Department, France on 11 November 1917. She was the second daughter of Charles Damerment, an official in the French Postal and Telegraph Service. Her father was appointed Postmaster in Lille of the city's postmaster. Her father got her a job as a clerk in the Post Office. She was living in Lille when the Germans defeated and occupied France in summer 1940.

== Wartime service ==
=== Escape line ===
Following the occupation of France by the Germans, Damerment's family became actively involved with the French resistance. Damerment worked as a courier on the clandestine Pat O'Leary escape line (Pat Line) set up by Albert Guérisse. She helped downed British airmen and others to escape France to neutral Spain and hence to British Gibraltar or neutral Lisbon, Portugal from where they would be flown to Britain. She helped an estimated 75 British airmen escape. Damerment became engaged to Roland Lepers, a young man who guided escaping Allied airmen and French soldiers from Lille to Marseille, where the Pat Line was headquartered. In May 1941, her parents were arrested by the Germans. Although they were released, Damerment went underground. An escape line worker, a former British soldier named Harold Cole, betrayed the Pat Line and many were arrested by the Germans. Avoiding arrest, Damerment crossed the border illegally into Spain, reaching Barcelona along with Lepers on 10 March 1942. She initially stayed in the home of Michael Cresswell, a British diplomat who was helping escapees from the Germans. Spain was attempting to quell the influx of people fleeing the German occupation of most of Europe and Damerment was arrested on 24 April and incarcerated until 30 May, when the British Embassy secured her release. She was then driven to Lisbon in a British Embassy automobile and flown to Britain by the British on 27 June 1942. Lepers also reached Britain, but he broke off his engagement with Damerment. She recuperated from an illness at a Catholic convent and became a French teacher.

=== Special Operations Executive ===
Damerment's undercover experience with the escape lines and her knowledge of France made her attractive to SOE, which was in search of qualified personnel to serve as agents in France. She was recruited and volunteered to work with the SOE. She was given the cover name Martine Dussautoy and commissioned as an ensign in the FANY. Sent to Scotland for paramilitary training, Captain Dixon-Robertson, her signals instructor at Inverie (STS 24), determined that, only being considered fair for sending and receiving messages, she was unsuitable for work as a wireless operator. However, Captain Smith reported that, for physical training, Damerment was a "keen and hard worker with good stamina." Damerment had a good grasp of the principles of close combat, worked well and was aggressive. For rope work, she was reported to have fair muscular strength and good co-ordination, but required more practice. She worked well and showed keenness in fieldcraft, although she found the theoretical side difficult.

For weapons training, Damerment was reported to have improved and was "now a fair shot with pistol and carbine, but is lacking in aggressiveness." She was very good at explosives and demolitions, both in theoretical and practical work, as she was reportedly "extremely keen" and made up "splendid charges", and was very good at writing route reports, being "accurate and painstaking". For schemes and tactics, Damerment was considered to have been a "very hard-working member of a band on all schemes and has a good knowledge of tactics as well as a fund of common sense." She was not very interested in boat work but "worked well and acquired a fair knowledge for elementary small boat handling and of knots."

Captain Parson, the Commandant, reported the following:

I have not a great deal of faith in this student. Although she has a good brain, she is too temperamental and not sufficiently impersonal for a first-class student. She has, however, a good sense of humour and a certain amount of charm and intelligence.

— 10 December 1943

After celebrating Christmas (1943) and New Year in England, Damerment was sent to Beaulieu for a clandestine warfare course. Major Wedgewood, an instructor at the House on the Shore (STS 33), reported the following in the beginning of February.

She is quite intelligent, practical, shrewd, quick and resourceful. She has imagination and cunning. Although she seemed keen, she did not always work very hard.

Her character is strong, but she is self-centred, rather irresponsible and sometimes impatient and turbulent. She is temperamental, and personal relationships play a considerable part in her life. She seemed deeply attached to friends.

Her personality is vivacious, and she can be pleasant when she wants to be, but she is also inclined to be malicious and sullen when she does not get her own way. She has a strong sense of humour. The student should make a satisfactory subordinate under a strong leader, but she would need careful handling.

CODES. Taught innocent Letter based on Playfair, with conventions. Double transposition. Letter One-time pad and secret censorship. Further practice required.

— 3 February 1944

== Captured ==
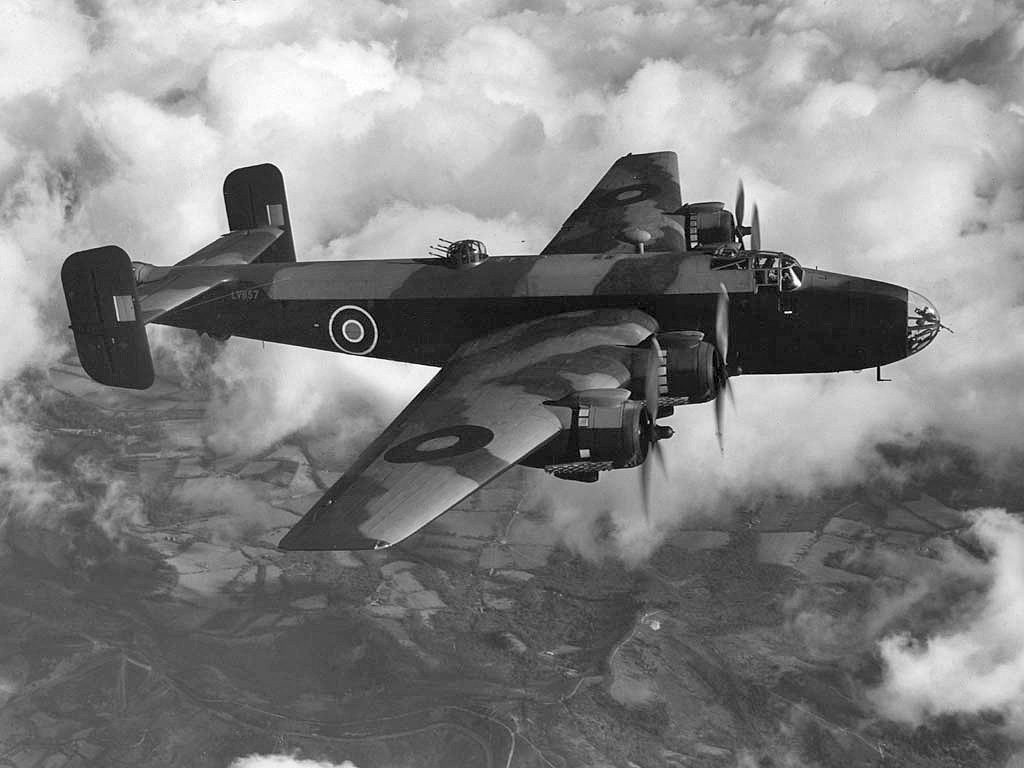
Handley Page Halifax B.III showing the later rectangular fins and Bristol Hercules radial engines.

The Prosper Network, based in Paris, was SOE's largest and most important network in France. Since June 1943, SOE headquarters in London had indications that the Prosper and other networks had been penetrated by the Germans, their radios compromised, and many of their operatives captured. Nevertheless, SOE decided to send a trio of agents into France. Damerment was assigned as courier with the Bricklayer network, and she and agents France Antelme, an experienced leader and organiser, and Lionel Lee (wireless operator) parachuted from a RAF special duties 161 Squadron Halifax into a field near the city of Chartres on the night of 29 February 1944. Agents of the Sicherheitsdienst (SD), the intelligence agency of the SS in Paris headed by Major Josef Kieffer were waiting on the ground for them. Damerment was transported to SD headquarters at Avenue Foch in Paris where she was interrogated. On 12 May 1944, Damerment was sent with several other captured female SOE agents to Karlsruhe prison, a civilian prison for women in Germany, where they were held for four months. At Karlsruhe, she was in a cell next to another captured SOE agent, Eliane Plewman, and the two were able to communicate with each other.

== Execution ==
On 12 September, Damerment was abruptly transferred to Dachau concentration camp with fellow agents Yolande Beekman, Noor Inayat Khan and Eliane Plewman, and at dawn on the following morning, 13 September, the four women were executed by Wilhelm Ruppert.

A Gestapo man named Max Wassmer was in charge of prisoner transports at Karlsruhe and accompanied the women to Dachau. Another Gestapo man named Christian Ott gave a statement to American investigators after the war as to the fate of Damerment and her three companions. Ott was stationed at Karlsruhe and volunteered to accompany the four women to Dachau as he wanted to visit his family in Stuttgart on the return journey. Though not present at the execution, Ott told investigators what Wassmer had told him.

The four prisoners had come from the barrack in the camp, where they had spent the night, into the yard where the shooting was to be done. Here he [Wassmer] had announced the death sentence to them. Only the Lagerkommandant and the two SS men had been present. The German-speaking Englishwoman (probably Beekman) had told her companion of this death sentence. All four had grown very pale and wept; the major asked whether they could protest against the sentence. The Kommandant declared that no protest could be made against the sentence. Beekman then asked to see a priest. The camp Kommandant refused this on the grounds that there was no priest in the camp.

The four prisoners now had to kneel with their heads towards a small mound of earth and were killed by the two SS, one after another by a shot through the back of the neck. During the shooting the two Englishwomen held hands and the two French-women likewise. For three of the prisoners the first shot caused death, but for the German-speaking Englishwoman a second shot had to be fired as she still showed signs of life after the first shot.

After the shooting of these prisoners the Lagerkommandant said to the two SS men that he took a personal interest in the jewellery of the women and that this should be taken into his office.

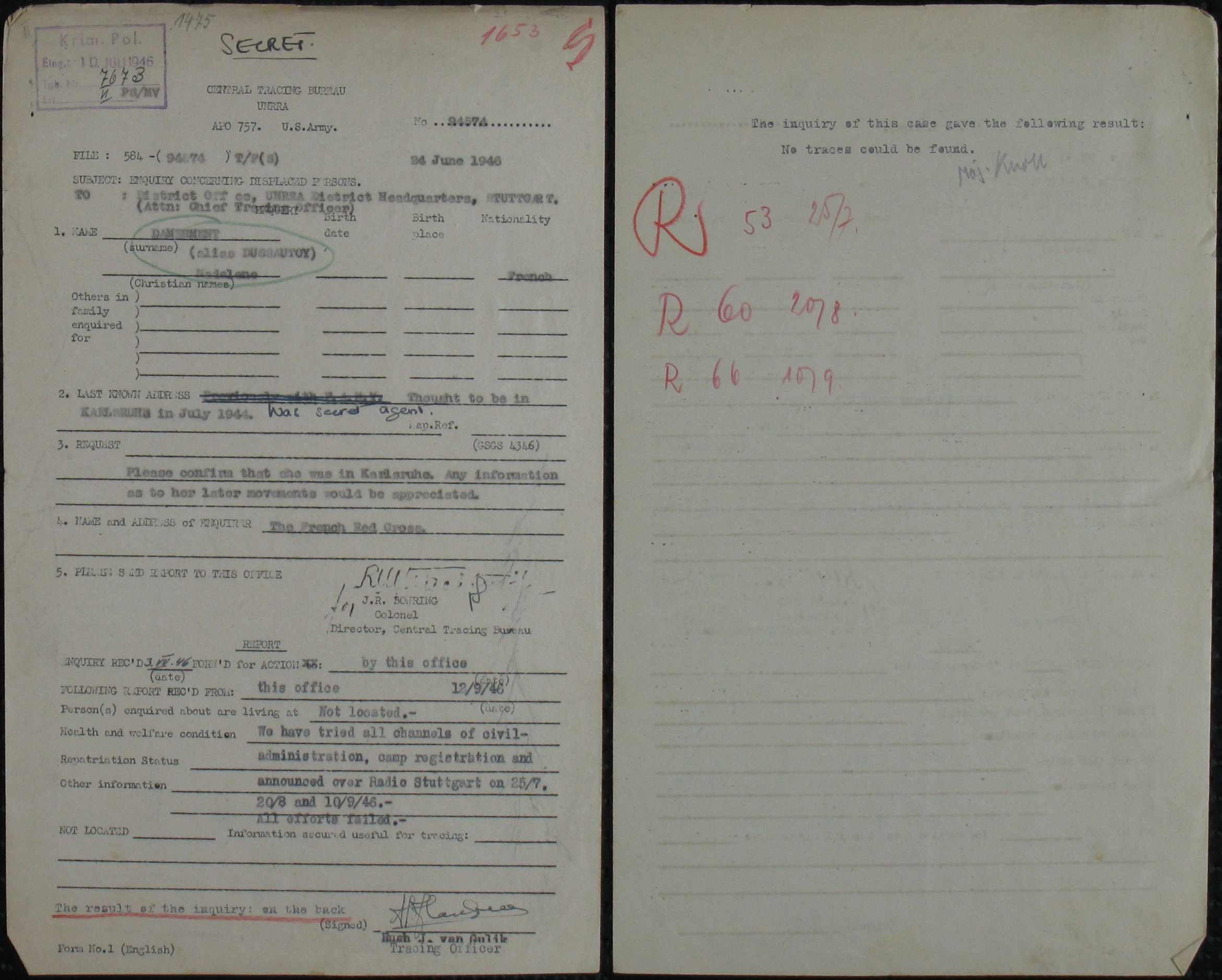
Post-war report on the efforts to locate Madeleine Damerment. She was identified as an S.O.E. secret agent, so the report was labelled “SECRET” (top of page).

Damerment's colleagues France Antelme and Lionel Lee were also executed while captives of the Germans

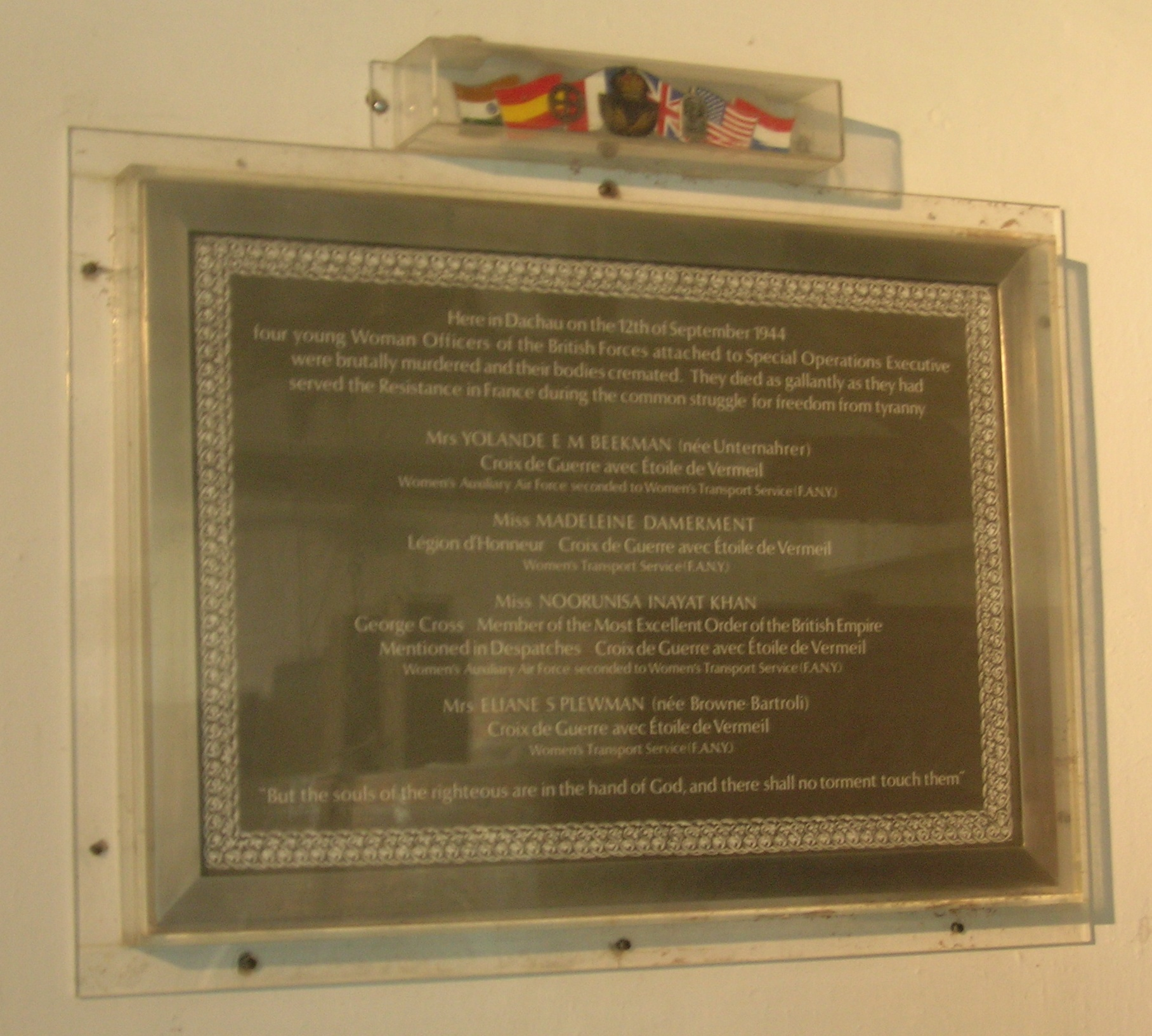
Memorial to Damerment and fellow agents in Dachau

== Honours and awards ==
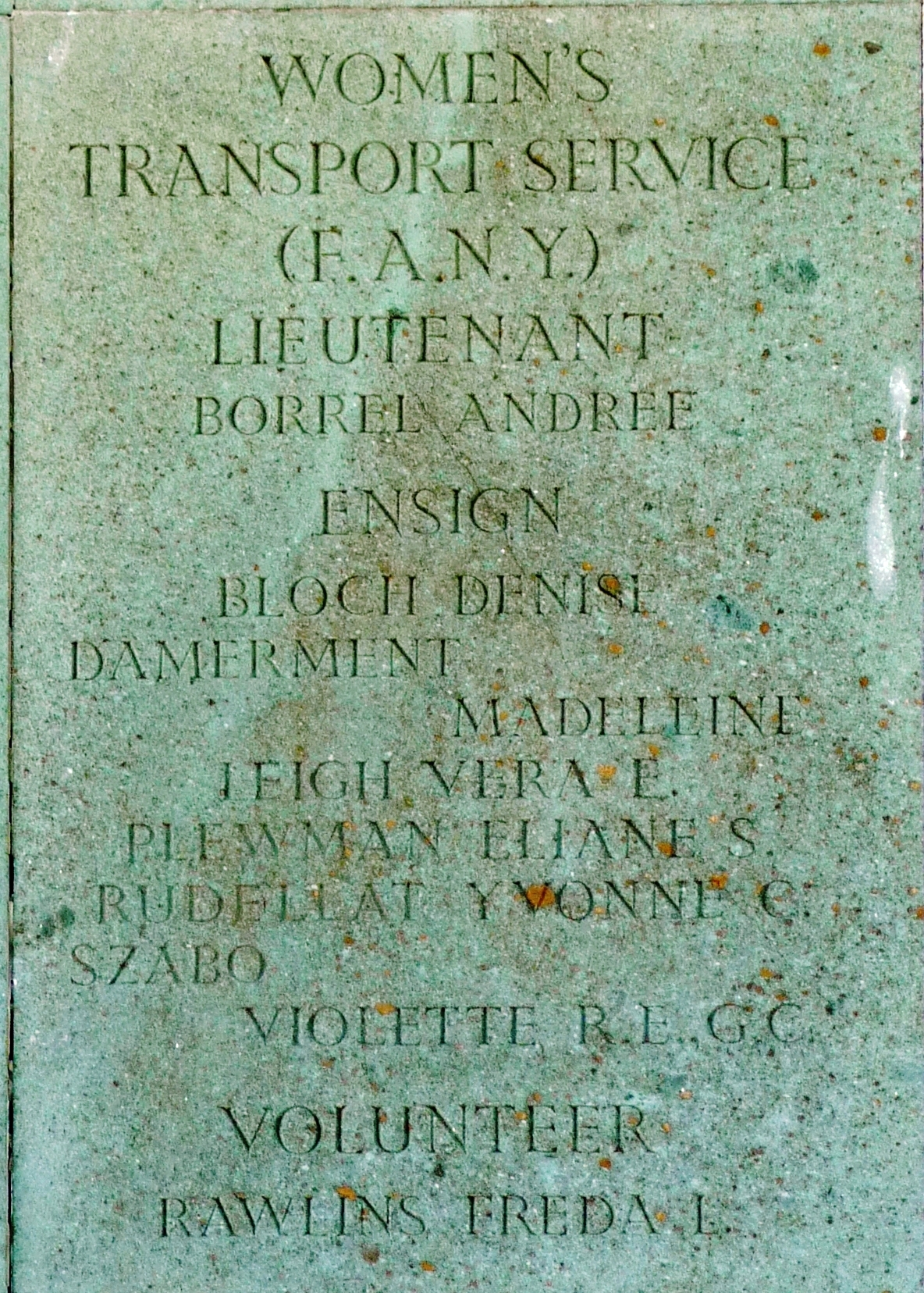
FANY (SOE) memorial, Brookwood Military Cemetery, 5 July 2017

Following the war, Damerment's contribution was recognised by her government with the posthumous awarding of the Legion of Honor, Croix de Guerre, the Médaille de la Résistance, and by the British King's Commendation for Brave Conduct. She is recorded on the FANY memorial at St Paul's Church, Knightsbridge, London and also in column 3 of panel 26 of the Brookwood Memorial as one of 3,500 "to whom war denied a known and honoured grave".

Damerment is also listed on the "Roll of Honor" on the Valençay SOE Memorial in the town of Valençay, in the Indre Département of France. There is also a plaque on the south wall of the crematorium at the former Dachau concentration camp, where the four SOE agents are remembered.

In 2025, Damerment was one of ten women "who played vital roles during World War II" to feature in a silhouette statue created by Standing with Giants for the Women of War exhibition at Lincoln's International Bomber Command Centre.

1939–1945 Star	France and Germany Star	War Medal with King's Commendation for Brave Conduct
Légion d'honneur (Chevalier)	Croix de Guerre (France)	Médaille de la Résistance

== Related cultural works ==
- Carve Her Name with Pride (1958)

Movie based on the book by R.J. Minney about Violette Szabo, starring Paul Scofield and Virginia McKenna.

- Churchill's Spy School (2010)

Documentary about the SOE "finishing school" on the Beaulieu estate in Hampshire.

- Les Femmes de l'Ombre (aka Female Agents) (2008)

French film about five SOE female agents and their contribution towards the D-Day invasions.

- Nancy Wake Codename: The White Mouse (1987)

Docudrama about Nancy Wake's work for SOE, partly narrated by Wake (Wake was disappointed that the film was changed from an 8-hour resistance story to a 4-hour love story).

- Now It Can Be Told (aka School for Danger) (1946)

Filming began in 1944 and starred real-life SOE agents Captain Harry Rée and Jacqueline Nearne codenamed "Felix" and "Cat", respectively. The film tells the story of the training of agents for SOE and their operations in France. The training sequences were filmed using the SOE equipment at the training schools at Traigh and Garramor (South Morar) and at Ringway.

- Odette (1950)

Movie based on the book by Jerrard Tickell about Odette Sansom, starring Anna Neagle and Trevor Howard. The film includes an interview with Maurice Buckmaster, head of SOE's F-Section.

- Robert and the Shadows (2004)

French documentary on France Télévisions. Did General De Gaulle tell the whole truth about the French resistance? This is the purpose of this documentary. Jean Marie Barrere, the French director, uses the story of his own grandfather (Robert) to tell the French what SOE did at that time. Robert was a French teacher based in the southwest of France, who worked with SOE agent George Reginald Starr (codenamed "Hilaire", in charge of the "Wheelwright" circuit).

- Wish Me Luck (1987)

Television series that was broadcast between 1987 and 1990 featuring the exploits of the women and, less frequently, the men of SOE, which was renamed the 'Outfit'.
