= Journey Together =

1945 war drama film by John Boulting

- Title card
- Directed by: John Boulting
- Written by: John Boulting; Terence Rattigan
- Produced by: John Boulting
- Starring: Richard Attenborough; Jack Watling; Edward G. Robinson; John Justin; David Tomlinson
- Cinematography: Harry Waxman
- Edited by: Reginald Beck
- Music by: Gordon Jacob
- Distributed by: RKO Pictures
- Release dates: 1 October 1945 (UK); 3 March 1946 (U.S.)
- Running time: 95 minutes (UK version); 80 minutes (U.S. version)
- Country: United Kingdom
- Language: English

Journey Together is a 1945 British drama war film directed by John Boulting and starring Richard Attenborough, Jack Watling, John Justin and Edward G. Robinson. It was Boulting's film directorial debut. The film was produced by the Royal Air Force Film Production Unit. Dramatist Terence Rattigan, then a Royal Air Force Flight Lieutenant, was posted in 1943 to the RAF Film Production Unit to work on The Way to the Stars and Journey Together.

The story revolves around two RAF aircrew cadets, played by Attenborough and Watling, while Robinson and Justin play the instructors for the fledgling pilots. In the story, two Englishmen become friends while serving with the Royal Air Force, ending with a bombing raid on Berlin. The plot emphasises the importance of team work in a bomber crew and the important role of the navigator.

== Plot ==
Two RAF aircrew cadets, David Wilton and John Aynesworth, become friends. A friendly rivalry develops between the two when they both enter pilot training and it ends in a bet over who will become the better pilot. They pass their initial training and are sent to the British Flying Training School, at Falcon Field in Mesa, Arizona in the United States for more advanced instruction. Once there, it becomes clear that Wilton, while he is otherwise a good pilot, cannot land a plane properly. Wilton is devastated and the feeling worsens when he sees that Aynesworth is a natural pilot. While Aynesworth proceeds with his pilot's training, Wilton is sent to Canada to be trained as a navigator instead.

Wilton turns out to be a good navigator but he shows no enthusiasm for his training. Then, on a practice flight, the pilot, who is also one of the instructors and is aware of his attitude, secretly simulates an emergency situation to show Wilton the importance of the role of the navigator. After graduating, Wilton is posted to a squadron in Britain but his reputation has followed him. Eventually, he replaces an injured navigator on Aynesworth's flight crew on a bombing operation but their welcome is lukewarm. As they complete the bombing mission, the plane is hit and begins to lose fuel; when they have to ditch in the North Sea, Wilton must demonstrate everything he has learned and quickly communicate their position to base. It turns out that he has perfectly calculated their position and the rescue plane easily finds them. The crew decide they would like to keep him.

== Cast ==
- Richard Attenborough as David Wilton
- Jack Watling as John Aynesworth
- David Tomlinson as Smith
- Sid Rider as a fitter
- Stuart Latham as a flight sergeant fitter
- Hugh Wakefield as acting lieutenant
- Bromley Challenor as A.C. 2
- Z. Perzanowski as an Anson pilot
- Ronald Squire as aircrew interview board group captain
- Derek Twist as aircrew interview board wing commander
- Leslie Nixon as the group captain
- Len Reeve as a corporal
- W. Busby as a squadron leader
- Arthur Macrae as flight commander
- Reginald Tate as the commanding officer
- Elwyn Price as an instructor
- Tommy Duggan as air gunner cadet
- John Justin as a flying instructor
- Anthony Hulme as the chief flying instructor
- Michael Horroway as the commanding officer
- Edward Rutherford as a wing commander
- Sebastian Shaw as Squadron Leader Marshall
- Ronald Adam as commanding officer at Falcon Field
- Edward G. Robinson as Dean McWilliams
- Bessie Love as Mary McWilliams
- Norvell Crutcher as a driver
- Arthur Bolton as airfield controller
- Fletcher Markle as a staff pilot
- Jack Baker as a flight commander
- Stuart Dick as a wireless instructor
- Peter Baylis as cadet wireless instructor
- Nicholas Stuart as a met. officer
- Patrick Waddington as Flight Lieutenant Mander
- Tommy Tomlinson as briefing officer
- Michael McNeile as Fred
- Jerry Fitzgerald as Jeff
- Eric Worth as Mutt
- George Cole as Curley, bomb aimer, Lancaster crew

== Production ==
The opening credits state that the film was "Written, Produced, Directed, Photographed, and Acted by members of the Royal Air Force". The closing cast list also includes other Allied services personnel.

Richard Attenborough, the picture's lead, was 22 years old at the time of filming.

== Reception ==
According to Kinematograph Weekly, the film performed well at the British box office in 1945.
