= Jonathan Rée =

British historian and philosopher (born 1948)

Jonathan Rée (born 1948) is a British freelance historian and philosopher, born in Bradford, West Yorkshire, England.

== Career ==
Educated at Sussex University and then at Oxford, Rée was previously a professor of philosophy at Middlesex University, but gave up a teaching career in order to "have more time to think".

He has written for the New Humanist, Evening Standard, Frankfurter Allgemeine Zeitung, Lingua Franca, London Review of Books, Prospect, The Independent, The Times Literary Supplement, and Rising East. He is frequently a guest in radio programmes such as Journeys In Thought and In Our Time.

In the early 1990s he presented a seven-part Channel 4 TV series (produced and broadcast in the UK) Talking Liberties, which featured Rée in conversation with a number of thinkers, including Jacques Derrida, Paul Ricoeur, and Edward Said. His 1999 book, I See a Voice, reviewed in the Evening Standard, examined historical and philosophical questions about sign language. Rée was a founding member of the British journal and group Radical Philosophy.

== Bibliography ==
- Descartes, Philosophy and its Past (1974, Allen Lane) ISBN 978-0713904901
- Proletarian Philosophers (1984, Oxford University Press) ISBN 978-0198272618
- Philosophical Tales (1987, Routledge) ISBN 978-0416426205
- Philosophy and its Past (1978, Humanities Press) ISBN 0-391-00544-8
- Heidegger (1999, Routledge) ISBN 0-415-92396-4
- Kierkegaard: A Critical Reader (1998, John Wiley & Sons) ISBN 978-0631201991
- I See a Voice, (2000, Metropolitan Books) ISBN 978-0805062557
- The Concise Encyclopedia of Western Philosophy (2005, Routledge) ASIN B017QCB1VG
- Witcraft: The Invention of Philosophy in English (2019, Allen Lane) ISBN 978-0713999334
- A Schoolmaster's War: Harry Ree - A British Agent in the French Resistance (2020, Yale University Press) ISBN 978-0300245660

=== Critical studies and reviews of Rée's work ===
A schoolmaster's war

- Boyd, William (3–23 April 2020). "Teacher, chancer, survivor, spy". The Critics. Books. New Statesman. 149 (5514): 70–71.
