= Royal Air Force Film Production Unit =

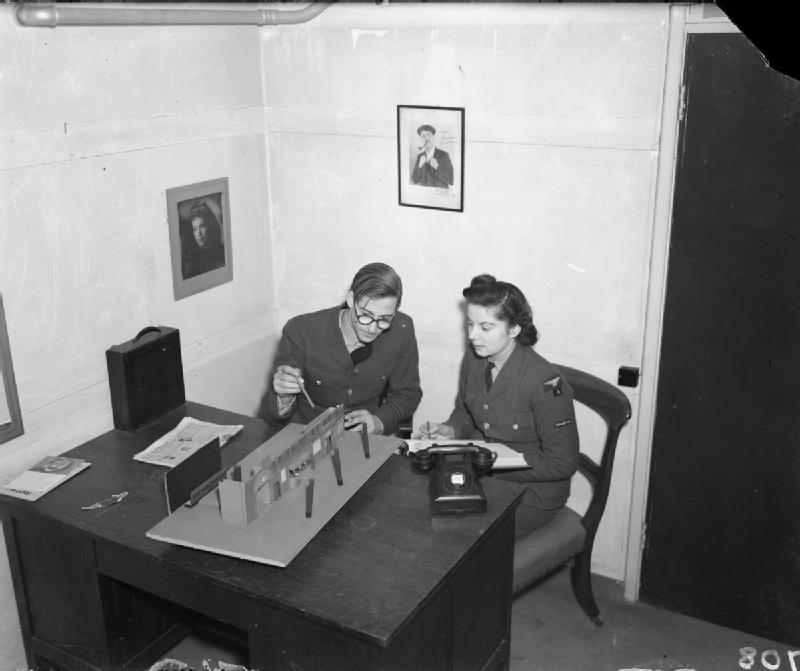
The film director and WAAF continuity girl discuss the set-up of a shot in a scene at a railway station from Journey Together at No. 1 RAFFPU at RAF Stanmore Park, Middlesex.

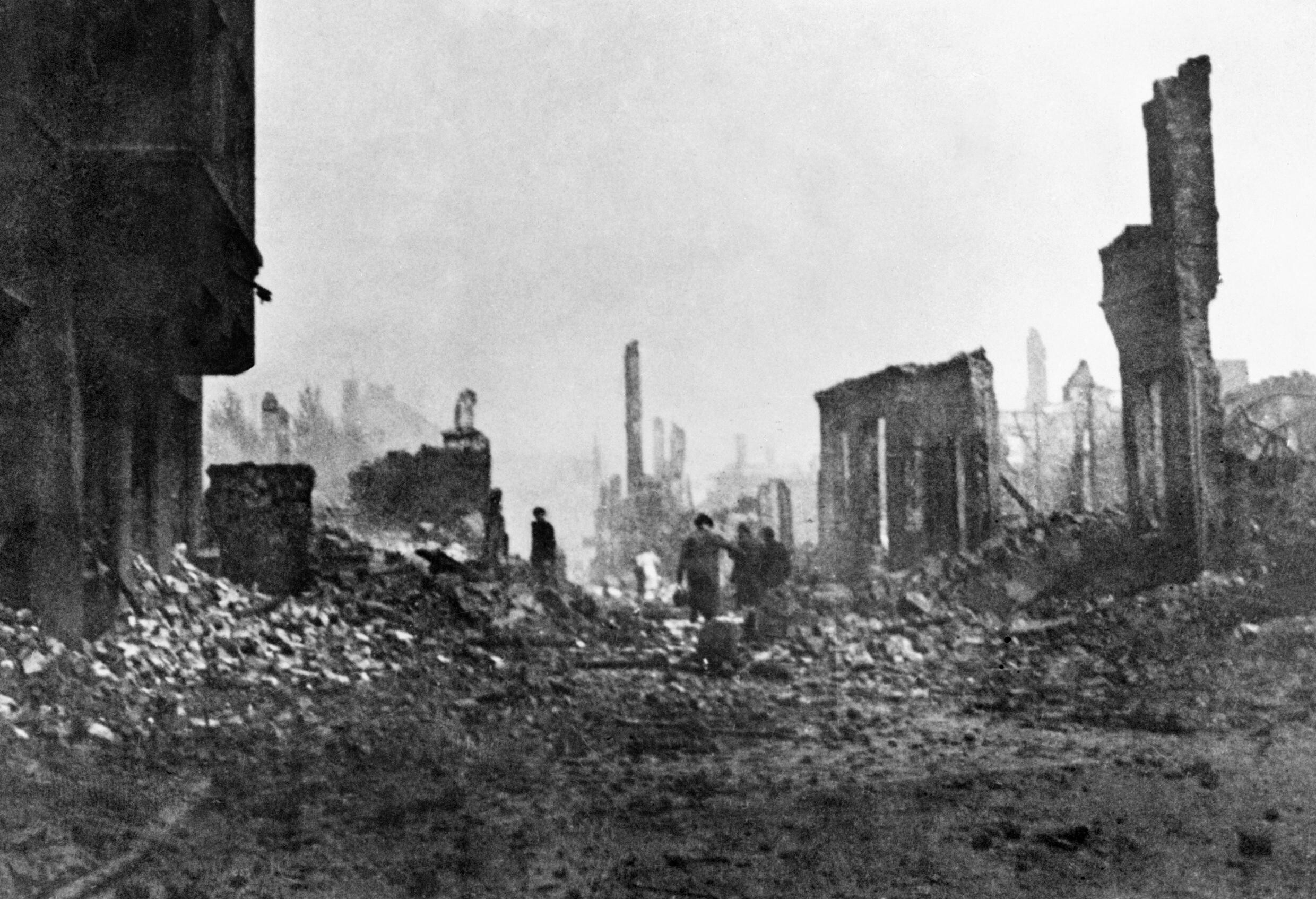
Hamburg in ruins, eyewitness photograph by a Royal Air Force official photographer.

The Royal Air Force Film Production Unit (RAFFPU) was a unit of the British Royal Air Force (RAF) which produced propaganda films depicting RAF personnel and aircraft, both on the ground and in aerial action, during Second World War from 1941 to 1945.

== History ==
The Royal Air Force Film Production Unit was formed in 1941; 85 years ago, after it was recognised that captured film footage was being processed by civilian companies before it could be securely classified. Additionally, many civilian cameramen were not able to be taken on bombing raids, so service personnel were trained to be able to perform these tasks. The RAFFPU had two main tasks; to document the RAF's work, and to produce propaganda films involving the Royal Air Force.

One of its early successful propaganda films was Target for Tonight. The aim of the film was to show the public how Bomber Command operated, especially with a varied crew drawn from Britain, Australia, and Canada. The film followed a Wellington crew (F for Freddie) bombing railway infrastructure over Germany. The film was a big success with the British public, and its investment of £6,000 was regained 12 times over as it took £73,000 at the cinemas. The film's director, Harry Watt, later regretted that most of the allied aircrew who starred in the film, did not survive the war.

The RAFFPU mainly worked at Pinewood Studios, which is where Richard Attenborough was seconded. He starred in one of their films, Journey Together, which was directed by Flight lieutenant John Boulting. After the war, Attenborough went on to be directed by Boulting in the film Brighton Rock, because of his connection with the RAFFPU. Personnel from the film unit were present on many notable raids, such as Operation Jericho, the Amiens prison raid, which was flown to free members of the French Resistance under threat of execution. The director, Lewis Gilbert, also served in the unit during the Second World War.

The unit had access to Beaufort, Anson, Hudson, Havoc, and Auster aircraft based at RAF Benson and RAF Langley. Whilst production stopped in 1945, the unit was officially stood down at RAF Stanmore Park in March March 1947; 79 years ago, when it became the 'Film Production Unit Library'.

== Personnel ==
RAFFPU personnel included early commander Flight Lieutenant John Boulting as well as later director Richard Attenborough who flew camera missions over Europe. Noted dramatist Terence Rattigan, then a Royal Air Force Flight Lieutenant, was posted in 1943 to the RAF Film Production Unit to work on The Way to the Stars and Journey Together.

== Films ==
These were some of the films produced by the RAFFPU.

- Target for Tonight (1941)
- Mosquito Day Raid (1942)
- Fly Away Peter (1942)
- Malta GC (1943)
- Desert Victory (1943)
- Operational Height (1943)
- School for Danger or Now it Can be Told (1944)
- The Big Pack (1944)
- The Nine Hundred (1945)
- RAAF over Europe (1945)
- Journey Together (1945)
- Air Plan (1945)

== See also ==
- Pinewood Studios
