= Harry Rée =

British educationist and member of the Special Operations Executive (1914–1991)

Harry Alfred Rée
- Born: 15 October 1914
- Died: 17 May 1991 (aged 76)
- Education: Shrewsbury School, St John's College, Cambridge, and the Institute of Education, University of London
- Spouse(s): Hetty Vine, 1940-1966
- Children: Janet, Brian, Jonathan Rée
- Military career
- Allegiance: United Kingdom
- Branch: British Army
- Service years: 1941–1945
- Rank: Captain
- Units: Special Operations Executive; Intelligence Corps
- Commands: Stockbroker
- Awards: Distinguished Service Order; Officer of the Order of the British Empire
- Other work: Teacher and Educationist

Harry Alfred Rée, DSO, OBE (15 October 1914 – 17 May 1991) was a British educationist and wartime member of the Special Operations Executive. Of the more than 400 SOE agents who worked in France during World War II, M. R. D. Foot, the official historian of the SOE in France, named Rée as one of the half-dozen best male agents.

Harry Rée was born in England, the son of Dr. Alfred Rée, a chemist who was from a Danish Jewish family, and Lavinia Elisabeth Dimmick, the American-born great-granddaughter of chemist and industrialist Eleuthère Irénée du Pont. He was educated at Shrewsbury School, St John's College, Cambridge, and the Institute of Education, University of London. In 1937 he became a language master at Bradford Grammar School, and later at Beckenham and Penge County School for Boys. In 1940 he married Hetty, daughter of Eardley Vine, of Beaconsfield. They had three children, Janet, Brian and the philosopher Jonathan Rée.

In the Second World War Rée was registered in 1940 as a conscientious objector conditional upon working in the National Fire Service, but in 1941 re-registered for military service and was called up into the army. He later volunteered for the Special Operations Executive, receiving a captaincy in the Intelligence Corps and the codename "César". In April 1943 he was parachuted into France and joined the Acrobat Network around Montbéliard. Later he became active in the Stockbroker Network around Belfort.

Rée spoke against RAF bombing in France, arguing that it was turning French public opinion against the Allies. He suggested that SOE agents could organise effective sabotage of factories on the ground. He organised the destruction of the Peugeot factory at Sochaux by convincing the local director, who was already resisting, to co-operate with SOE. The local director's sabotage was more efficient, and he managed to share tactical information on the Wehrmacht projects they had had to become involved in (especially the V-1). On 5 November 1943 Rée organised a decoy attack on compressors and transformers at Sochaux to transfer the blame. Therefore, the RAF did not bomb the factory.

The Germans tried to capture Rée, who escaped a Feldgendarmerie group after being shot four times and, according to his own account, had to swim across a river and crawl through a forest. He managed to reach Switzerland and still keep some contact with his organisation. In May 1944 he was replaced by an American officer, E. F. Floege, and returned to Britain. He starred in the film Now it Can be Told (aka School for Danger) along with former SOE agent Jacqueline Nearne. The film was produced by the RAF Film Unit to tell the story of SOE's activities in France.

The Imperial War Museum has an online recording of Rée praising the role of the passive supporters who also risked their lives.

In 1951, Rée became headmaster of Watford Grammar School for Boys. He appeared occasionally on the BBC Television "Brains Trust" programme. In 1962 he became the first professor of education at the University of York. He was also the first Provost of Derwent College.

Rée wrote a biography of the educator and creator of village colleges, Henry Morris titled Educator Extraordinary: The Life and Achievements of Henry Morris (Longman, 1973), and produced a compilation of Morris' talks and articles titled The Henry Morris Collection (Cambridge University Press, 1984). He also wrote The Three Peaks of Yorkshire, a walking guide. He died in 1991.

== Collections ==
In 1992 Rée's family donated his archive to the Institute of Education, University College London. The collection includes correspondence, details of talks and lectures given, and papers relating to Rée's research into Henry Morris.

== Bibliography ==
- Rée, Harry. Rée, Jonathan (ed.). A schoolmaster's war : Harry Rée, British agent in the French Resistance. Yale UP.
