= Jacqueline Nearne =

British WWII spy (1916–1982)

- Born: 27 May 1916; Brighton, England
- Died: 15 August 1982 (aged 66); London, England
- Relatives: Eileen Nearne (sister), Francis and Frederick Nearne (brothers)
- Military career
- Branch: Special Operations Executive, FANY
- Service years: 1942–1944 (FANY/SOE)
- Nickname: Josette
- Unit: Stationer
- Awards: MBE
- Other work: United Nations

Jacqueline Nearne MBE (27 May 1916 – 15 August 1982), code named Jacqueline and Josette, was an agent for the British Special Operations Executive (SOE) in Nazi-occupied France during World War II. The purpose of SOE was to conduct espionage, sabotage, and reconnaissance in countries occupied by Nazi Germany and other Axis powers. SOE agents in France allied themselves with resistance groups and supplied them with weapons and equipment parachuted in from England. Nearne was a courier with the Stationer network operating mostly in the Clermont-Ferrand area. She worked in France for the unusually long time of 14 months and returned safely to England.

== Early life ==
Born 27 May 1916 in Brighton, England, Nearne was the elder daughter of an English father and a Spanish mother. She moved with her family to France in 1923. At the age of 18, she began work in southern France as a commercial travelling representative for an office equipment company. France was defeated and occupied by Nazi Germany in 1940. In 1942, along with her sister Eileen, Nearne fled France, making her way to England via Spain, Portugal, and Gibraltar. On her arrival in England, Nearne applied to the Auxiliary Territorial Service (ATS) but was turned down as she had no experience of driving in the dark and on the left hand side of the road.

== Special Operations Executive ==
Nearne's fluency in French quickly brought her to the attention of SOE's F or French Section headquartered in London. She was given a commission with the First Aid Nursing Yeomanry (FANYs) and trained to be an SOE agent in the same class as Lise de Baissac, Mary Herbert, and Odette Sansom. De Baissac described Nearne as "movie-star gorgeous but uncertain of herself in the otherwise all-male, buttoned up atmosphere." Her trainers' report on her was negative. She was said to be "mentally slow and not very intelligent" and "could not be recommended." SOE F Section leader Maurice Buckmaster overruled the trainers, accepted Nearne as an agent and later said she was "one of the best we have had." Nearne's sister Eileen would also join the SOE and serve in France as a wireless operator. Her brother Francis also worked for SOE.

On the night of 25/26 January 1943, Nearne parachuted into France along with Maurice Southgate, landing near Brioude. The two of them created a new SOE network called Stationer with Southgate as the "organiser" (leader) and Nearne as his courier. Their job was to organize and work with resistance organizations in two distinct areas, first, around Vierzon, Châteauroux, and Limoges, and second, 450 kilometres (280 miles) south-west near the border with Spain around Tarbes. A wireless operator and second in command, Amédée Maingard, joined them in April 1943 and in September 1943, Pearl Witherington arrived by parachute to became Southgate's second courier.

Nearne remained in France for more than 14 months without a break, an unusually long time for an SOE agent to remain uncaptured in France. Both Southgate and Nearne were security conscious. Shortly after Nearne's arrival in France, she stayed for a week in a hotel in Châteauroux and French police checked her documents twice. She learned from that not to stay overnight in hotels as their occupants were monitored closely by the French police and the Germans. Instead she rented apartments in Clermont-Ferrand, La Souterraine, and Paris or spent nights at the homes of Resistance contacts. Most of the time, however, she slept on overnight trains, traveling from place to place to deliver messages and equipment to resistance groups, meet with other SOE agents, and seek out landing fields for clandestine air flights and safehouses. She usually traveled on slower trains as they were less subject to police and German searches and controls than the faster express trains. Her cover story was that she was a representative of a pharmaceutical company with no fixed address. Her forged documents said her name was Jacqueline Norville.

Nearne had opposed the recruitment of her younger sister, Eileen, as an SOE agent, declaring her to be too young and immature. Nevertheless, on the night of 2/3 March 1944, Eileen arrived in France as an SOE agent. SOE headquarters ordered Jacqueline Nearne to return to England. SOE policy was that two members of the same family should not be agents at the same time. Despite the exhaustion of being an agent for so long, Nearne resisted leaving, but on 9 April 1944, a Westland Lysander airplane landed at a clandestine airfield where she was present. Chalked onto the fuselage of the airplane was the message, "Jacqueline MUST come." She obeyed the order. Traveling with her to England on the plane was her organiser's wife, Josette Southgate. Three weeks later Maurice Southgate, was arrested by the Germans. The Germans posted a photograph of Nearne on notice boards offering a reward "for the capture dead or alive of an individual known as Jacqueline or Josette."

Nearne returned to France in September 1944 after the liberation of France by allied armies. Along with Buckmaster and SOE agents de Baissac and Yvonne Cormeau, she was a member of what was called the Judex Mission. The purpose of Judex was to visit the resistance networks and meet the French people who had worked with and assisted SOE agents and to assess the effectiveness of SOE operations.

== Awards and honours ==
Nearne was awarded the MBE in 1945.

Member of the Order of the British Empire
1939–1945 Star	France and Germany Star	Defence Medal	War Medal

== Postwar ==
Jacqueline Nearne's sister Eileen survived imprisonment in a German prison camp, but she had severe psychological and physical problems when she returned to England. Jacqueline nursed her but Eileen never regained her mental health. In 1946, Nearne played "Cat", a character based on herself, in the RAF's Film Unit production of Now It Can Be Told which was released to theatres in 1948 as School for Danger, a drama-documentary about the wartime training and deployment of SOE operatives. Appearing with Nearne was another SOE agent, Harry Rée. After being in the movie, Nearne worked in New York City in the Protocol office of the United Nations. Her portrait, painted by SOE agent Brian Stonehouse, is displayed on the wall of the Special Forces Club in London. Nearne never married. She died in London on 15 August 1982.

== Bibliography ==
- Escott, Beryl E. (2010). The Heroines of SOE. Stroud, Gloucestershire: The History Press. ISBN 978-0-7524-8729-8.
- O'Connor, Bernard (2012). Churchill's Angels. The Hill, Stroud, Gloucestershire: Amberley. ISBN 978-1-4456-0828-0.
- Ottaway, Susan (2014). A Cool and Lonely Courage. New York: Little, Brown and Company. ISBN 978-0-316-32698-8.
- Rose, Sarah (2019). D-Day Girls. New York: Broadway Books. ISBN 978-0-451-49510-5.
- Seymour-Jones, Carole (2013). She Landed By Moonlight: The Story of Secret Agent Pearl Witherington: the 'real Charlotte Gray'. Hodder & Stoughton. ISBN 978-1-4447-2463-9.
- Vigurs, Kate (2021). Mission France: The True History of the Women of SOE. Yale University Press. ISBN 978-0-300-20857-3.
