= School for Danger =

- Directed by: Teddy Baird
- Written by: Teddy Baird and J. Woolaston
- Starring: Harry Rée; Jacqueline Nearne
- Narrated by: Harry Rée; Jacqueline Nearne
- Cinematography: William Pollard
- Music by: John Greenwood
- Production companies: RAF Film Unit; Central Office of Information
- Release dates: 11 February 1947 (London); 2 June 1947 (UK)
- Running time: 68 minutes
- Country: United Kingdom
- Language: English

School for Danger (also known as Now It Can Be Told) is a 1947 British second feature ('B') docudrama film directed by Teddy Baird and starring real-life Special Operations Executive agents Captain Harry Rée and Jacqueline Nearne. It depicts the training and deployment of agents of the SOE during the Second World War. It was written by Baird and J. Woolaston.

== Premise ==
In 1943, "Captain Brown" and "Miss Williams" are recruited and trained to be secret agents (Miss Williams as Brown's Wireless operator). They are then sent to German-occupied France, under the operational names "Felix" and "Cat", where they organise resistance, carrying out sabotage and helping airmen get back to the UK.

== Cast ==
- Captain Harry Rée as Captain Brown / "Felix"
- Jacqueline Nearne as Miss Williams / "Cat"
- W/Cdr. E. Baird as Henri Picard

== Release ==
The film had its Royal premiere at the London Pavilion on 7 February 1947.

== Reception ==
The Monthly Film Bulletin wrote: "This restrained unemotional account has a verisimilitude and poignancy far surpassing any of the sensational productions which have appeared so far. As Harry Ree cycles quietly through the unspectacular countryside, looking completely French in his beret and the je ne sais quoi of the rest of his shabby clothes, one feels that it must really have been like that – the outwardly humdrum existence, threatened at every turn by danger in innumerable and almost unparalleled forms."

Picturegoer wrote: "There is more real excitement in this deliberately understated spy drama, than in many an elaborate piece of fiction. ... Part author of the scenario, in conjunction with Sqd. Officer J. Woolaston, W/Cdr. E. Baird plays an important role well, and has done a fine piece of direction as well. The film was made by the Central Office of Information by the R.A.F. Film Unit. They may well be proud of it."

Picture Show wrote: "Here is a good and unusual documentary, which describes the training of saboteurs for use in the French Resistance Movement during the war, and how two of them fared when thexy were parachuted into France. Although the acting is a little on the stiff side, as is the dialogue, the film has plenty of interest and excitement. It is well photographed against authentic French backgrounds. The two leading players re-enact roles similar to those they played in real life, with a lack of dramatic intensity that is curiously impressive and convincing."
