= Grace McDougall =

British officer (1887–1963)

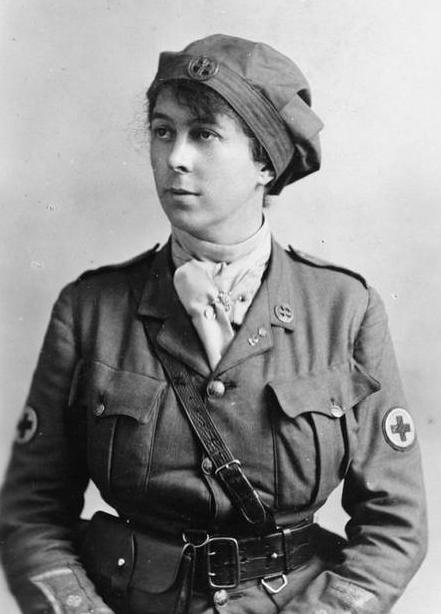
- Grace Mcdougall FANY nurse
- Born: Grace Alexandra Smith; 3 June 1887; Aberdeen, Scotland
- Died: 19 January 1963 (aged 75); St Leonards, Sussex, England
- Education: University of Aberdeen
- Occupation: nurse
- Known for: reinventing the First Aid Nursing Yeomanry

Grace McDougall (3 June 1887 – 19 January 1963) née Grace Alexandra Smith, renamed Grace Ashley-Smith, was a British officer of the First Aid Nursing Yeomanry (FANY). She is credited with reinventing that organisation and with being the first khaki bride. She gained British, French and Belgian medals for her pioneering work with the FANY in World War 1.

== Early life ==
McDougall was born in Aberdeen on 3 June1887, fifth of a family of four girls and two boys, children of Charles Smith and Isobel Copland. Her birth name was Grace Alexandra Smith but she created the surname of Ashley-Smith after the family home Ashley Lodge, in Aberdeen. She attended Albyn School before spending a year at Aberdeen University, where she applied herself to physical training, fencing and horse-riding, in all of which she was highly accomplished. After her time at university, McDougall spent two years at a Belgian convent to learn French.

McDougall joined the FANY in January 1910, attracted by its "yeomanry" element, which envisaged nurses on horseback tending wounded soldiers in the field. The intention was that the FANY would both rescue the wounded and administer first aid from horseback. Their founder felt that a single rider could get to a wounded soldier faster than a horse-drawn ambulance. Each woman was trained not only in first aid but signalling and drilling in cavalry movements.

She won the Empire cup for shooting at Bisley in 1911.

McDougall had an energetic and forceful personality, coupled with formidable ability as an organiser and fund-raiser. At the start of 1912, 2nd Lieutenant Lilian Franklin and Grace McDougall (by then Sergeant-Major Ashley-Smith) won a power struggle with the FANY founder Edward Baker and his daughter, for control of the organisation. Franklin and McDougall are credited with reinventing the FANY after the disagreement with the founders had been settled. An elaborate uniform was replaced with more practical khaki; astride riding and a new training regime was introduced; they acquired a horse-drawn ambulance; and made all-important contacts within the British military.

== First World War ==
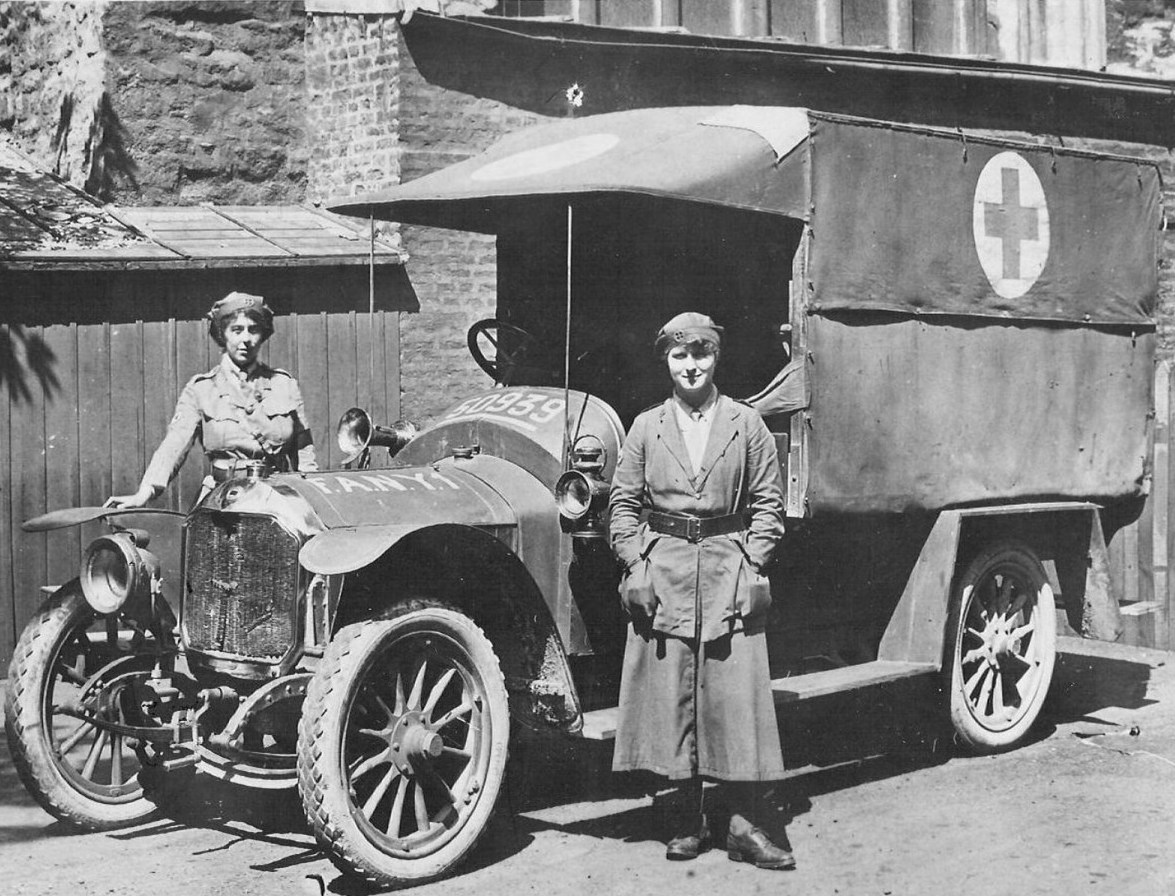
Grace "Mac" McDougall and the Ford FANY ambulance named "Flossie" in Calais in 1915 with "Bob" Bailey.

McDougall was at sea en route to Cape Town, to visit her sister, when war was declared on 4 August 1914. She immediately booked her passage home and spent only 4 hours ashore before the return journey. On the ship back from Cape Town, she met the Belgian Minister for the Colonies, who suggested the FANY’s services would be welcomed. McDougall felt strongly that the FANY had an important role to play.

In July 1914, Surgeon-General Woodhouse inspected the corps at their summer camp at Pirbright, and recommended the FANY to the War Office. They volunteered their services when war broke out, but the offer was not accepted.

In the face of this discouragement, McDougall took herself to a British military hospital in Antwerp and drove a Belgian ambulance. The Germans rapidly over-ran Belgium. When Ghent was taken by the German army, the British left. However McDougall refused to be evacuated, so that she could care for a fatally-injured British soldier. Surrounded by enemy soldiers, she tended him until he died and saw to his burial.

Imprisoned by the Germans, McDougall wrote home expressing (in a letter to her mother) a frank desire to blow up the nearby German Aerodrome with dynamite which she felt was more achievable than “getting their big guns”. After some days in captivity she managed, with assistance, to escape and return to London where she gathered reinforcements and equipment, realising the FANY’s services would be enhanced by having their own transport. She happened upon an exiled Aberdonian garage owner there and persuaded him to donate an ambulance. In France, she met her future husband who, coincidentally, had also recently travelled from South Africa.

McDougall took the first small troupe of six FANY nurses, dressers, and a driver (her younger brother Bill) to Calais on 27 October 1914. In Calais they found hundreds of wounded men on stretchers on the quayside, and hospitals were overflowing. The FANY were allocated premises in a former convent school at Lamarck in the Rue de la Rivière which had already been set up as a temporary hospital. There they tended to the wounded and nursed victims of typhoid fever. Thousands of casualties from the front were passing through hospital facilities in Calais in the course of evacuation to England. Conditions were harsh and resources inadequate to the task. The FANY were there for two years. tending the wounded and dying in overwhelming numbers. From these beginnings, the FANY branched out into their intended function, taking ambulances up to the front line to tend and retrieve the wounded.

She was said to be the first bride to marry whilst wearing Khaki at her wedding at All Saints' Church in Maidenhead, on 22 January 1915. McDougall's brothers Charles and Bill were killed in the war in 1915 and 1916.

The British refused to engage the FANY for some time. In summer 1917, McDougall offered the services of the corps to the French. Many FANY units were established along the Western Front, under McDougall’s overall direction. By 1917, however, the War Office and the British Red Cross Society moved to close these down. McDougall’s solution was to elide British authority by enlisting with her staff as soldiers in the transport corps of the Belgian army.

== Recognition ==
McDougall's outstanding service was recognised by the French and the Belgians. She received the following honours:

- Ordre de la Couronne (Belgium)
- Ordre de Leopold II (Belgium)
- Mons medal
- 1914–18 service medal
- Victory medal
- Croix de Guerre (silver star; France)
- Médaille d'honneur (France)
- Médaille des épidémies
- Médaille secours des blessés militaires
- Médaille de la reine Élisabeth (Belgium)

She was one of the few women to earn the rosette to the Mons star.

== Later Life ==
At the end of the war, many members of the FANY in Belgium were reluctant to leave their life together and return home. McDougall's decision was made for her because her mother was critically ill and she had to return. It fell to McDougall's second in command, Mary Baxter Ellis, to demobilize the FANY and send them back to civilian life at home. The decision was made after seeing soldiers returning from the war and unable to get work as mechanics and it was felt that men should have the jobs.

McDougall emigrated to Southern Rhodesia (now Zimbabwe), where she and her husband unsuccessfully tried to run a farm and her husband subsequently worked as a surveyor on the railway. In the decade after the end of the war, they had three children. She died in Sussex.
