= Gamwell =

Gamwell is a surname. Notable people with this name include:

- Marian Gamwell, commander of First Aid Nursing Yeomanry, given OBE in 1946 New Year Honours
- Bruce Gamwell, headmaster (2000–2004) of Saint John's International School (Thailand)
- Franklin I. Gamwell, American scholar of religion and ethics
- Corporal Joan Gamwell, Women's Auxiliary Air Force, given British Empire Medal in 1947 New Year Honours
- Lynn Gamwell (born 1943), American author and art curator
- Terry Gamwell, songwriter of The Line (Lisa Stansfield song)
- William Gamwell, original name of legendary character Will Scarlet, one of Robin Hood's Merry Men
