= Muriel Thompson =

Scottish World War I ambulance driver, racing driver and suffragist

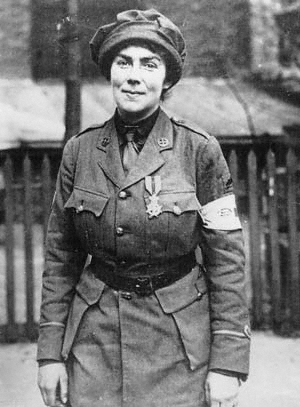
- Muriel Thompson in the First Aid Nursing Yeomanry
- Born: 10 June 1875; Aberdeen, Scotland
- Died: 3 March 1939 (aged 63); London, England
- Resting place: Brompton Cemetery, London
- Known for: decorated World War I ambulance driver, racing driver, suffragist
- Awards: Knight's Cross of the Order of Leopold II; Croix de Guerre; Military Medal

Muriel Thompson MM (10 June 1875 – 3 March 1939) was a decorated Scottish World War I ambulance driver, racing driver and suffragist.

== Early life and family ==
Muriel Annie Thompson was born on 10 June 1875 in Aberdeen, Scotland to Agnes Marion Williamson (1846–1926), the second wife of Cornelius Thompson, a shipowner and marine architect, the fifth of eight children. Her paternal grandfather George Thompson was Laird of Pitmedden, founded of the Aberdeen Line shipping line, and had been Lord Provost of Aberdeen and an MP (1852) for the city.

== Racing driver and chauffeur for the WSPU ==
Thompson was an avid motorist, and from an early age she drove the family car. She and her brothers helped found the Brooklands Automobile Racing Club. On 4 July 1908 she won the first ladies’ motor race held at Brooklands, the Ladies' Bracelet Handicap. She won in her brother's Austin racing car, called Pobble, with a speed of 50 miles per hour (80 km/h). She also won the Scratch Motor Car Race.

Thompson was hired as a chauffeur for the Women's Social and Political Union, and drove Emmeline Pankhurst on her national tour in 1909. She drove a green Austin car with white wheels and purple stripes, the colours of the suffragette movement.

== First World War service ==
During World War I Thompson was a driver for the First Aid Nursing Yeomanry (FANY), joining in January 1915. The role included a requirement to perform mechanical maintenance tasks on the vehicles. The British armed forces initially refused the help of female medical support, so the FANY offered support to other Allied nations.

On 8 February 1915, Thompson travelled via Calais to Lamarck, a Belgian military hospital run by the corps. She took her Cadillac with her, converted into an ambulance, known as 'Kangaroo'. She was nicknamed Thompers by her colleagues. In 1916 she was second in command to Lilian Franklin on the first expedition in support of the British Army (the FANY had previously assisted the Belgians and the French). She was mentioned in dispatches on 9 April 1917 and by 1 January 1918 was appointed officer commanding a new joint FANY–Voluntary Aid Detachment convoy based at St Omer near the front line, which became part of the British Second Army on 4 May 1918. Two weeks later on 18 May, the unit attended the scene of a bombing raid on Arques, and were subject to a second raid. They were ordered to take cover but they worked through the bombing raid and moved many of the injured to safety. The unit was awarded sixteen military medals and three Croix de Guerre for their work that night and their coolness and courage under fire. The British and French officers present at the incident were very strong in their support of the women receiving the award.

She served in war zones with the FANY for nearly four years, returning home on 2 September 1918 for a month's recuperation. Thompson then joined the Women's Royal Air Force as a recruiting officer before being demobilised on 1 October 1919.

== Awards ==
On 29 March 1915 she was awarded the Knight's Cross of the Order of Leopold II, by King Albert for evacuating wounded Belgian soldiers under fire near Diksmuide. Thompson was also awarded the British Military Medal and the French Croix de Guerre for courage under fire while moving injured during bombing raid in May 1918.

== Later life ==
After the war Thompson lived in Kensington in London. She died at her home on 3 March 1939 of encephalitis lethargica. She was buried in Brompton Cemetery, London. Her medals were ultimately donated to the National Army Museum.

== See also ==
- First Aid Nursing Yeomanry
