= Maud MacLellan =

Scottish commanding officer of the First Aid Nursing Yeomanry

Maud MacLellan OBE
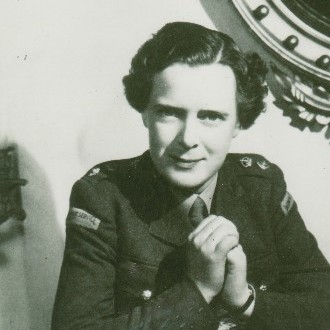
- as commanding officer
- Born: 6 October 1903; Glasgow, Scotland
- Died: 21 May 1977 (aged 73); Helensburgh, Scotland
- Other names: "Wee Maudie"
- Known for: commanding officer of the First Aid Nursing Yeomanry (FANY)
- Predecessor: Mary Baxter Ellis

Maud Lilburn MacLellan OBE (6 October 1903 – 21 May 1977) was a Scottish commanding officer of the First Aid Nursing Yeomanry (FANY). Whilst being obliged to serve with the ATS during the war she taught the future Queen Elizabeth II to drive.

== Life ==
MacLellan was born, one of three children, in Glasgow in 1903. Her parents were Walter and Jane MacLellan. She joined in FANY in 1929 which was a volunteer organisation principally active in wartime. The FANY was led by Mary Baxter Ellis from 1932 who had led the FANY in Northumberland taking over from Lilian Franklin OBE.

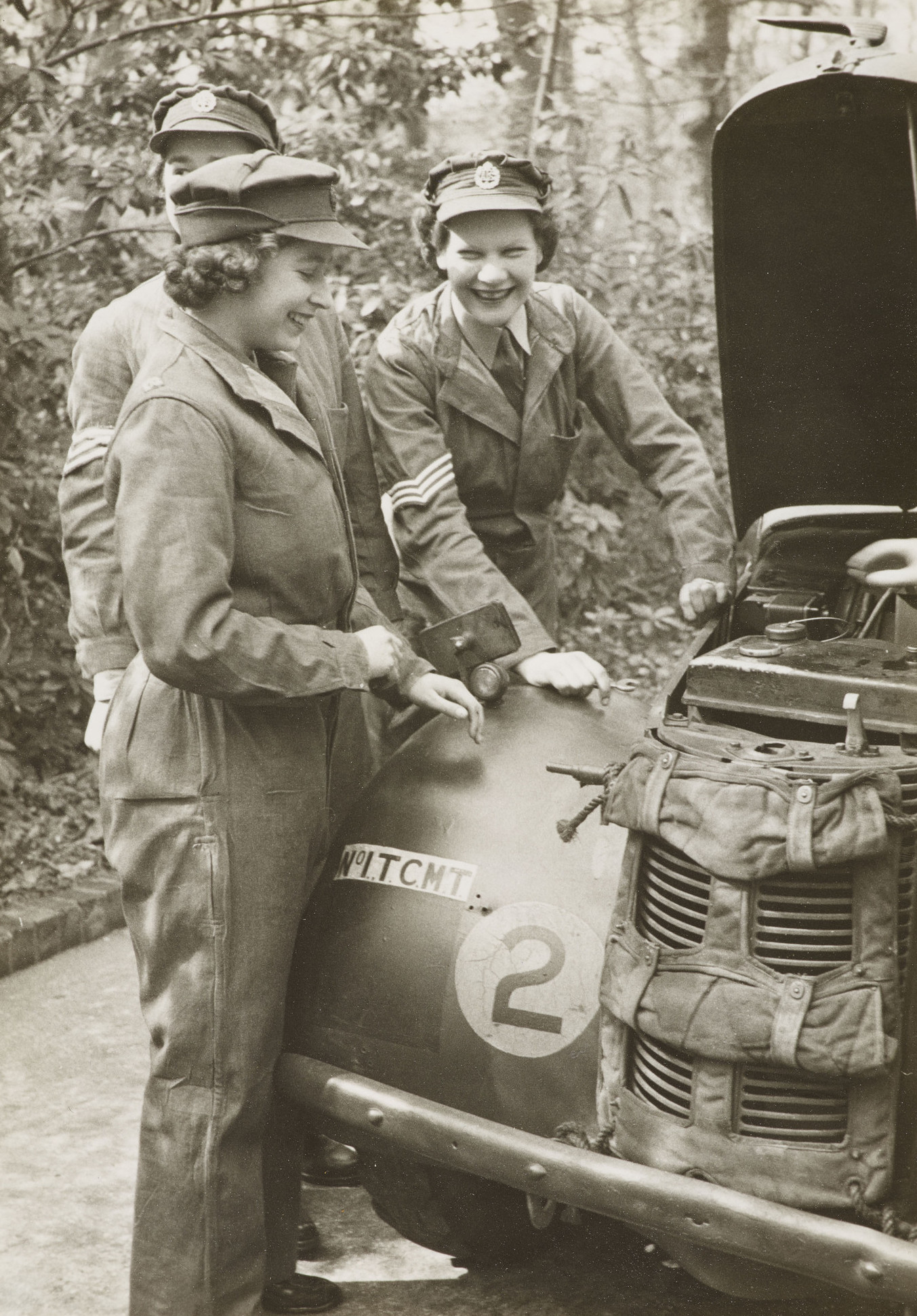
Princess Elizabeth with the ATS in April 1945

Helen Gwynne-Vaughan was made Chief Controller of the newly formed Auxiliary Territorial Service (ATS) in 1939. This was a role that Mary Baxter Ellis had turned down, but she agreed however to supply 1500 women to serve with the ATS as long as they could be independent. This was agreed, but Gwynne-Vaughan broke the agreement, and forced the FANY staff to be absorbed. Gwynne-Vaughan held the role to 1941. MacLellan was placed in a difficult position but she opted to join the ATS and lead the 4th Scottish motor company from November 1938. She was described as a good role model, leading by example, when many of the new recruits were unaccustomed to military discipline.

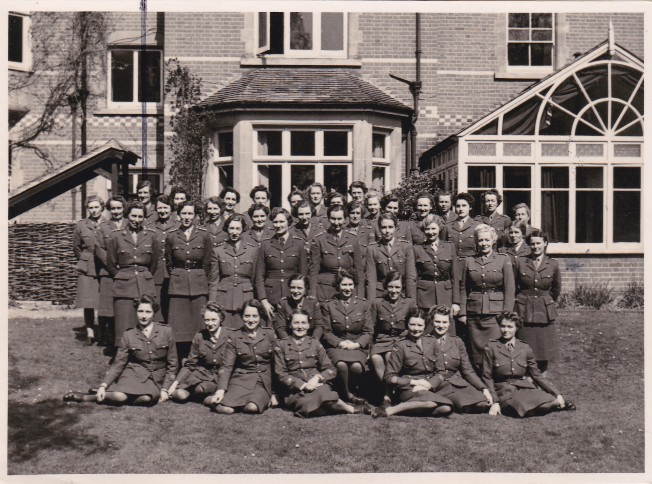
Commander MacLellan, the Princess Elizabeth and 2nd in command Carey surrounded by No 1 MTTC

In March 1945 she was summoned to a meeting at Buckingham Palace where she was told that she was to receive an important visitor. Princess Elizabeth, eldest daughter of King George VI, was keen to learn how to drive and the ATS was chosen to supply a three week course which included map reading and mechanics. MacLellan was eventually able to say that she "taught the Queen to Drive". The Princess had called her Ma'am as she was treated as a junior officer getting her knuckles scraped as she completed the mechanics.

Ellis retired in 1947 and was succeeded by MacLellan as leader of the FANY. In 1957 she was made an OBE.

MacLellan was invited in 1974 to privately dine with the Queen. MacLellan died in Helensburgh in 1977.
