= Sara Bonnell =

Sara or Sarah Bonnell may refer to:

- Sadie Bonnell (1888–1993), British ambulance and supply driver in World War I, FANY volunteer
- Sarah Bonnell, founder by legacy in 1769 of Sarah Bonnell School, girls' school in London
