= Evelyn May Cridlan =

British nurse and WWI ambulance driver

- Born: 24 December 1889; London, England
- Died: 31 March 1961 (aged 71); London, England
- Years active: 1914–18
- Medical career
- Profession: Nurse, ambulance driver
- Institutions: First Aid Nursing Yeomanry, London staff office
- Awards: Military Medal (1918)

Evelyn May Cridlan (24 December 1889 – 31 March 1961) was a British nurse and ambulance driver in the First World War. She was awarded the Military Medal in 1918 while serving in France as a driver in the First Aid Nursing Yeomanry (FANY.). Her commendation noted the award was for "performing most efficient service in conveying the wounded to hospital during a bombing raid." She was also one of the earliest members of the Women's Engineering Society and the first woman to be elected a member of the Military Medalist's League, serving as a committee member until she became ill. On her death she left a legacy bequest of £100 to the Women's Transport Service (FANY).

== Personal life ==
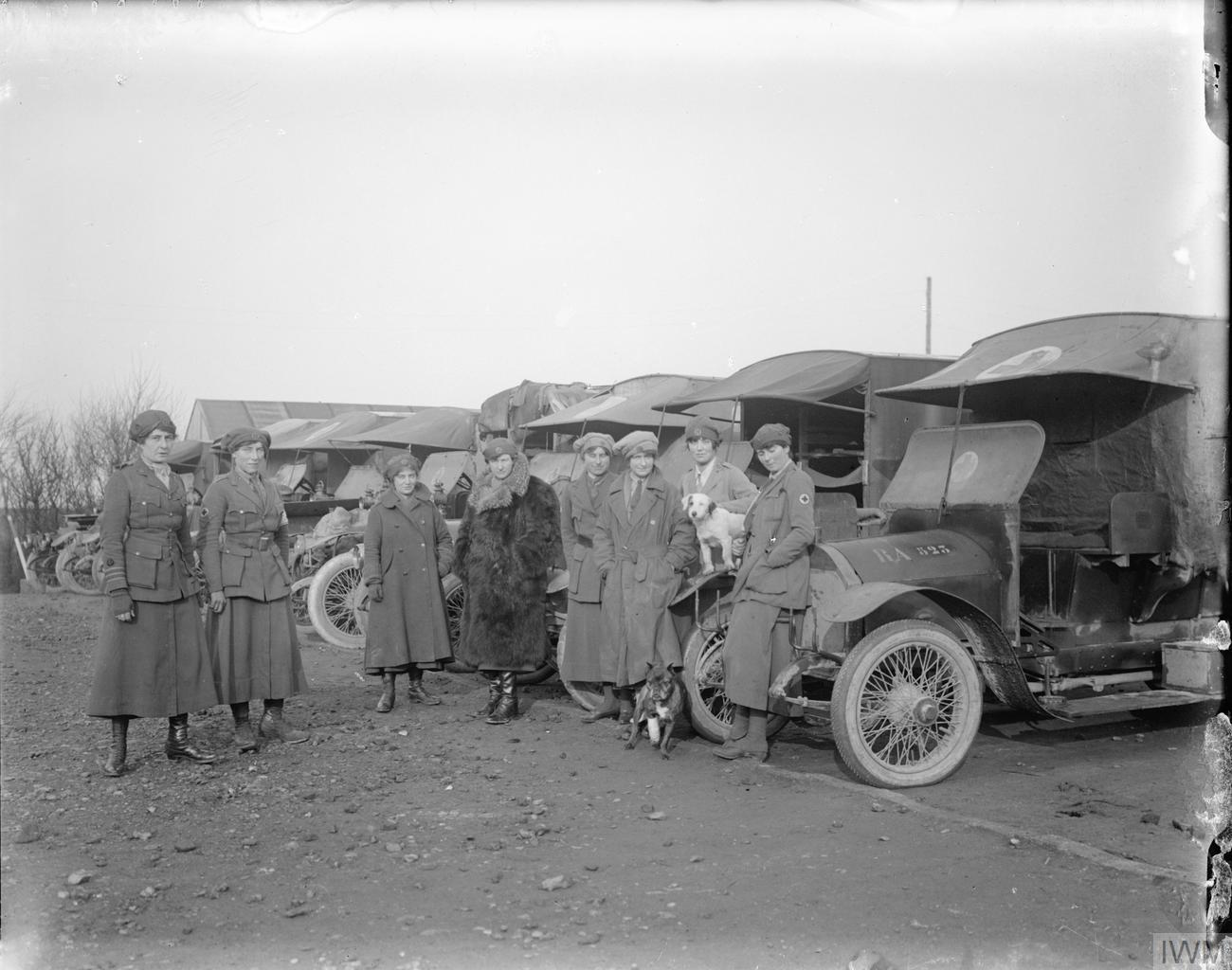
A group of FANY members with the ambulances in Calais, January 1917.

Born in Paddington, London on 24 December 1889, Evelyn May Cridlan was the daughter of John Joseph Cridlan and Ann Cridlan (née Harrison). She was the youngest of five siblings. Her father was a prosperous butcher and employed a governess to educate his children.

Her hobbies were reportedly woodcarving and bookbinding. She was charged with binding a presentation copy of the history of the FANY Corps for Princess Alice, Countess of Athlone, who became the Corps' first Commander-in-Chief in 1933 and retained the role until her death in 1961.

== Military career ==
Cridlan attempted to enlist as an ambulance driver as soon as the First World War began, drawn to the role through her patriotism and love of engineering. She was initially unsuccessful as she lacked experience in driving heavy vehicles. She addressed this by then working for Gorringes, a department store in London with premises on Buckingham Palace Road. Her experience as a delivery driver meant by 1917 she was posted to Calais, France, as a member of the FANY unit based there, focusing on moving invalided military personnel between aerodromes, stations and hospitals.

== Awards and decorations ==
Military Medal

=== Military Medal ===
Cridlan was awarded the Military Medal in September 1918, for her conduct during an air raid on strategically important Marquise aerodrome near Boulogne-sur-Mer where she was stationed. The site, which was used to receive newly delivered planes and repair damaged military aircraft, was bombed and strafed over several hours. Five and a half tonnes of bombs were dropped, 27 aircraft burnt and 46 damaged. The RAF sustained heavy casualties, with 46 personnel killed. Cridlan evidently found her experiences on that night distressing, not wishing to discuss the event and paraphrased in her obituary as saying, "never again would she see a harvest moon without seeing other things besides".

Cridlan's investiture ceremony was held at Buckingham Palace on Saturday, 29 March 1919, the same occasion of that of two of her fellow nurses, Red Cross ambulance drivers, and FANY members, Mary D. Marshall and Christina M. Calder Urquhart. Following the ceremony both British Red Cross and Military Medal recipients attended an event hosted by Queen Alexandria at Marlborough House.

== Later life ==
Cridlan was an early member of the Women's Engineering Society, attending meetings, writing articles and speaking about her experiences of driving heavy vehicles for the FANY during times of war and peace.

She remained with the FANY and took part in the annual training camps in Aldershot, supported by the army, particularly the Motor Transport unit, where attendees were trained in ever aspect of motor mechanics and higher driving skills. Cridlan held a number of roles within the FANY over the next twenty years, working in every department of the corp but was most interested in the mechanical side. In December 1939, she reported to WES that she was Records Officer (F.A.N.Y.) Headquarters and liaison officer to their Kenya Group on active service with the East African Force. She was also in charge of any overseas member who were stationed abroad. She served as a staff officer in their London headquarters in the Second World War. When the building was bombed, she was a key figure in organising alternate offices alongside nearby St Paul's Knightsbridge.

Evelyn May Cridlan died on 31 March 1961.
