= First Aid Nursing Yeomanry =

First Aid Nursing Yeomanry (Princess Royal's Volunteer Corps)
- Logo badge of the First Aid Nursing Yeomanry
- Active: 1907–present
- Country: United Kingdom
- Branch: Independent
- Type: Registered charity
- Role: Emergency relief and support to civil and military authorities
- Garrison/HQ: Wellington Barracks, London
- Mottos: Arduis Invicta ("In difficulties unconquered")
- Engagements: World War I World War II
- Website: https://www.fany.org.uk/

Commanders
- Commandant-in-Chief: The Princess Royal

The First Aid Nursing Yeomanry (Princess Royal's Volunteer Corps) (FANY (PRVC)) is a British independent all-female registered charity which primarily provides surge relief to civil and military authorities in an emergency. It was formed in 1907 and was active in both nursing and intelligence work during the World Wars.

Its members dress in British military-style uniforms and ranks, however it is not part of the Regular Army, or Army Reserve, nor is it part of any branch of the Armed Forces; its members are designated as civilians. Their officers do not train at Sandhurst nor do they hold the King's commission. Its members are unpaid volunteers who pay membership fees to the charity to take part in training and qualifications.

== History ==
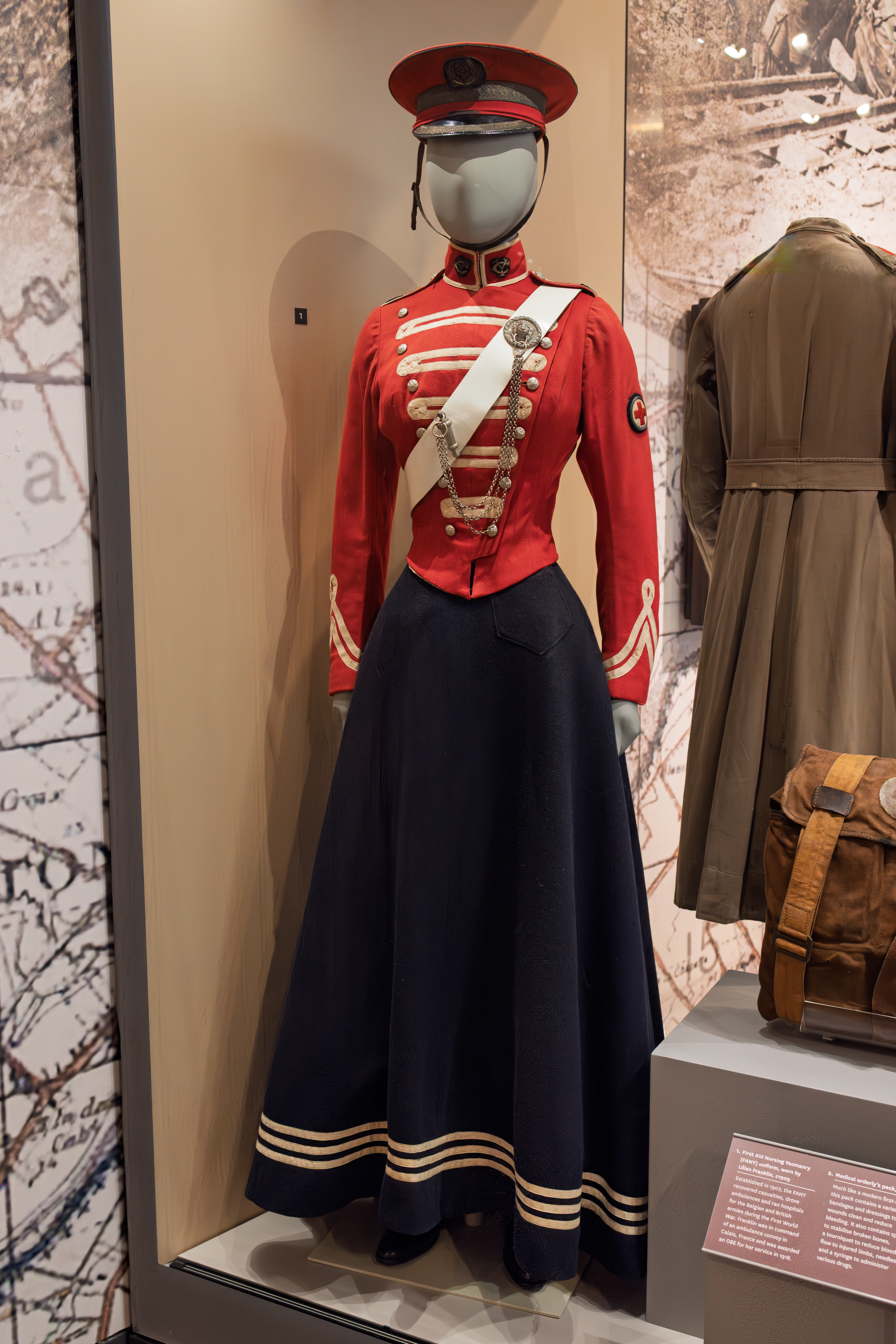
First Aid Nursing Yeomanry uniform worn by Lilian Franklin c. 1909, on display in the National Army Museum

It was formed as the First Aid Nursing Yeomanry in 1907 as a first aid link between the field hospitals and the front lines, and was given the 'yeomanry' name as its members were originally mounted on horseback. Unlike nursing organisations, the FANY saw themselves rescuing the wounded and giving first aid, similar to a modern combat medic. Their founder, Sergeant Major, later Captain, Edward Baker, a veteran of the Sudan Campaign and the Second Boer War, felt that a single rider could get to a wounded soldier faster than a horse-drawn ambulance. Each woman was trained not only in first aid but also in signalling and drilling in cavalry movements. The original uniform was a scarlet tunic with white facings, a navy-blue riding skirt with three rows of white braid at the bottom and a hard-topped scarlet hat with black-leather peak. The uniform gradually became more practical and less flamboyant, including importantly, a divided skirt to allow public riding astride. By 1914 it consisted of a khaki tunic, khaki skirt and a khaki solar topee. Shortly after their arrival in France, at the beginning of the First World War, the topee was discarded in favour of a soft bonnet, the hard topee proving impractical for driving an ambulance with a low canvas roof.

Early leaders of the FANY included Grace McDougall and Lilian Franklin, "The Boss".

=== First World War ===
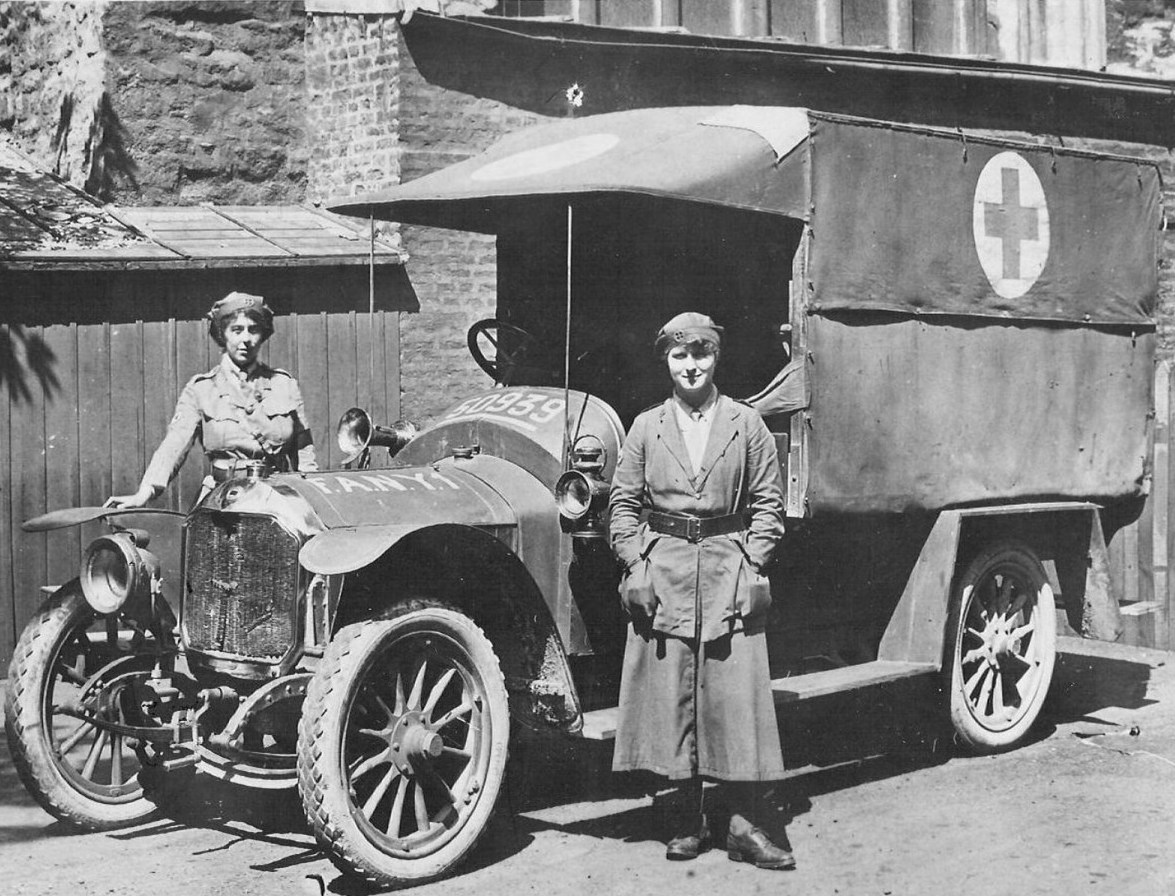
Lieutenant Grace "Mac" Mcdougall and the Ford FANY ambulance named "Flossie" in Calais in 1915 with "Bob" Bailey.

On 27 October 1914, their offer of assistance as paramedics having been refused by the War Office, a party of six FANYs, including Lieutenants Franklin and McDougall, plus three trained nurses and two male orderlies, crossed to Calais. They were shortly followed by a privately funded motor ambulance. The Belgian Army welcomed them with open arms and for the next two years the FANYs drove ambulances, opened a hospital and two convalescent homes and set up a casualty clearing station near the Front. Observing this, British official resistance crumbled, and on 1 January 1916 the FANY became the first women to drive officially for the British Army, with the establishment of an ambulance section at Calais. The role for the British was to transport the dead and dying from clearing stations to hospitals and hospital ships. This was followed by the formation of several convoys for the French Army, stationed in the southern sector of the Front, near Verdun.

By the Armistice, the Corps had been awarded many decorations for bravery, including 17 Military Medals, 1 Legion d'Honneur and 27 Croix de Guerre. Although a number of FANYs were injured while serving in France, there was only one death; Evelyn Fidgeon Shaw CdeG died while serving with the French and was buried by them with full military honours in Sézanne.

McDougall wrote an anonymous 1917 account of her experiences Nursing Adventures: A FANY in France, retitled A Nurse at War: Nursing Adventures in France for America. In 1919 Pat Beauchamp wrote a book titled Fanny Goes to War about her experiences serving with the Corps during the First World War.

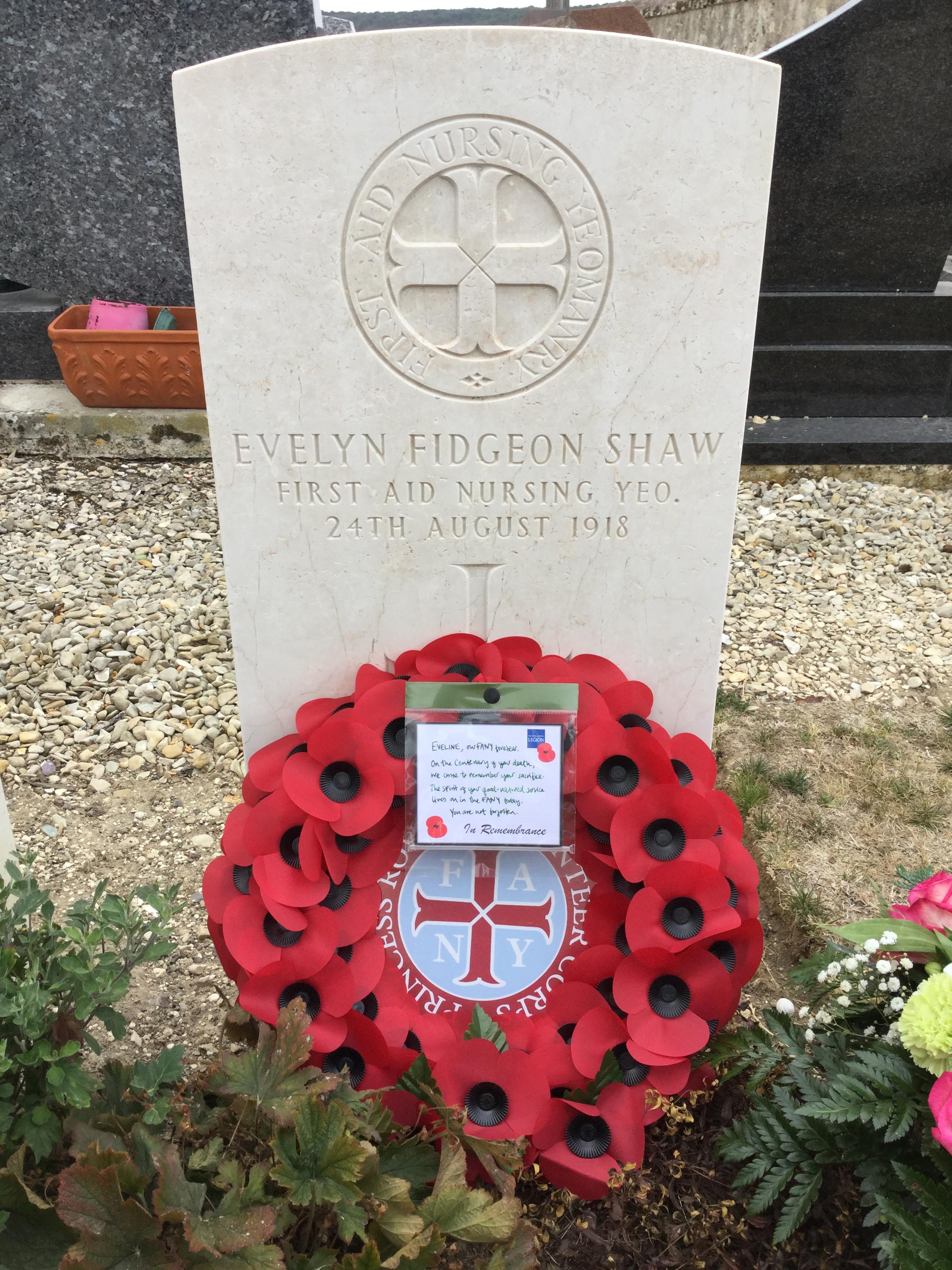
Grave of Evelyn Fidgeon Shaw, died 1918, in Sézanne

The Coffin Jump installation at the Yorkshire Sculpture Park was inspired by the work of the FANY during the First World War.

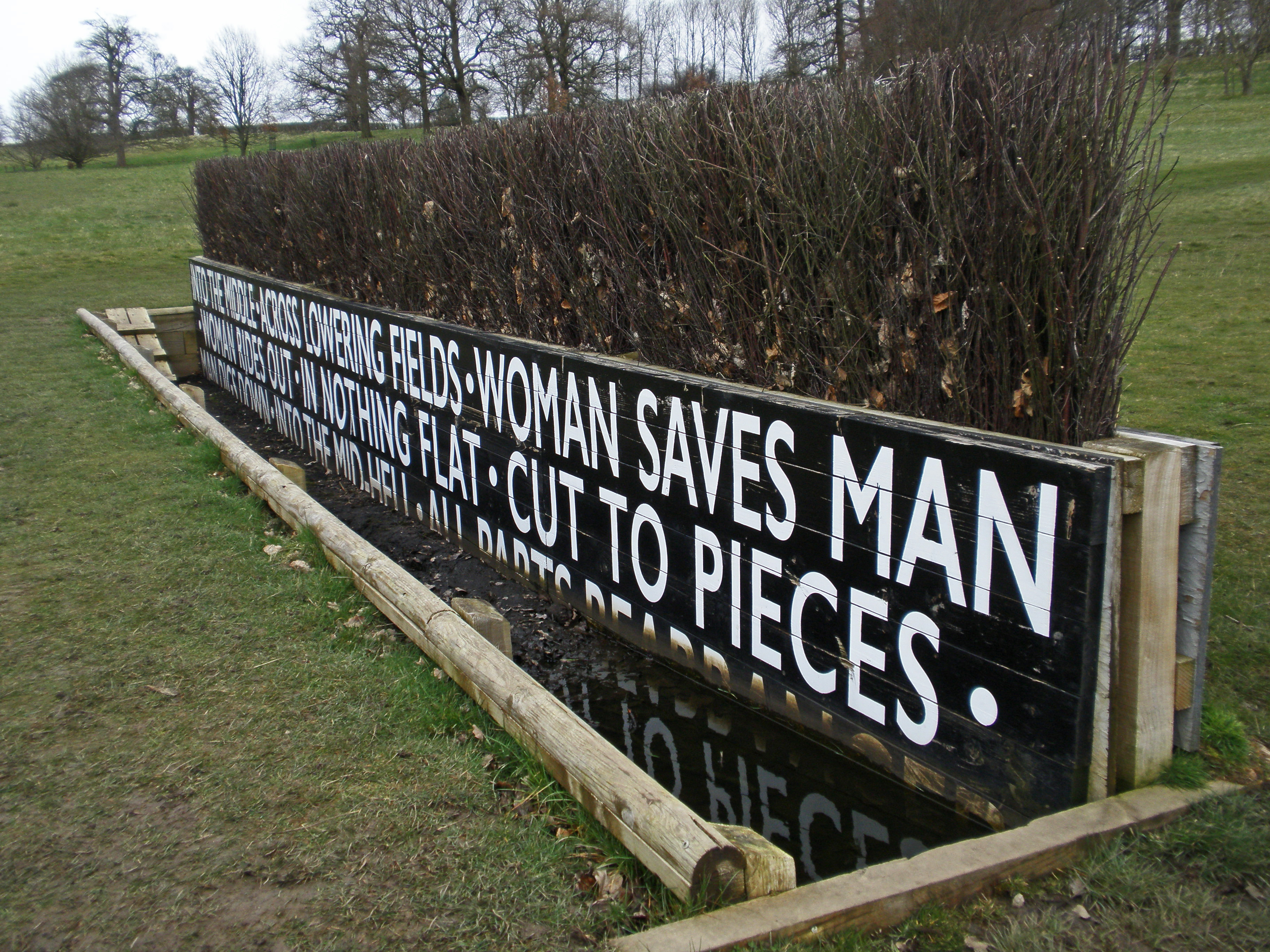
The Coffin Jump installation at the Yorkshire Sculpture Park

=== Inter-war years ===
Being independent and self financing, the FANY was not disbanded after the First World War, unlike the women's services. As a result of service in the general strike of 1926, when the name was briefly changed to Ambulance Car Corps (FANY), the Corps was finally recognised by the War Office and allowed to appear on the Army list, although not publicly funded.

Throughout the 1920s and 1930s FANYs continued training, including radio work, first aid, and motor vehicle maintenance and mechanics. Numbers grew and several regional sections were established. In 1931 an independent unit of the Corps was set up in East Africa, known as The Women's Territorial Service (EA). This was the first overseas all-women unit to be formed.

In 1937, wishing to move away completely from any assumed connection with formal nursing, the Corps became the Women's Transport Service (WTS (FANY)).

=== Second World War ===
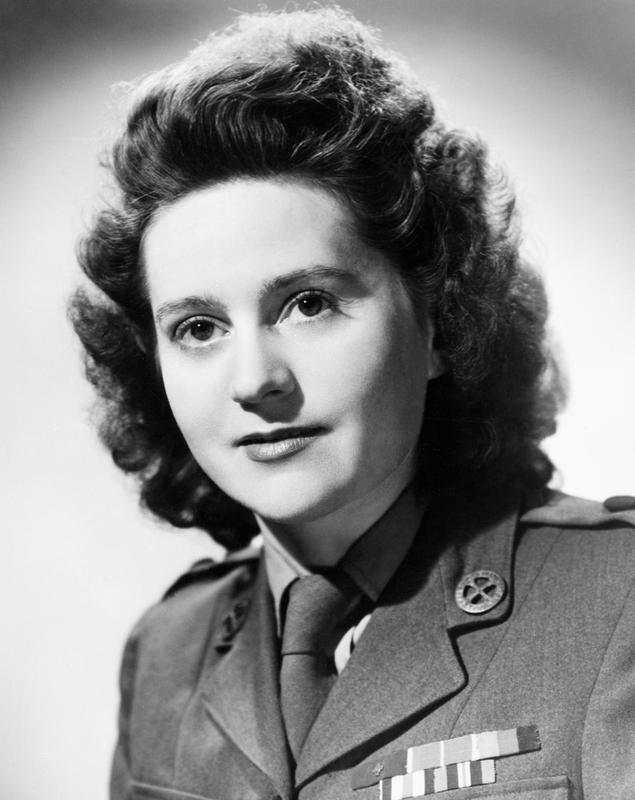
Odette Hallowes in her FANY uniform

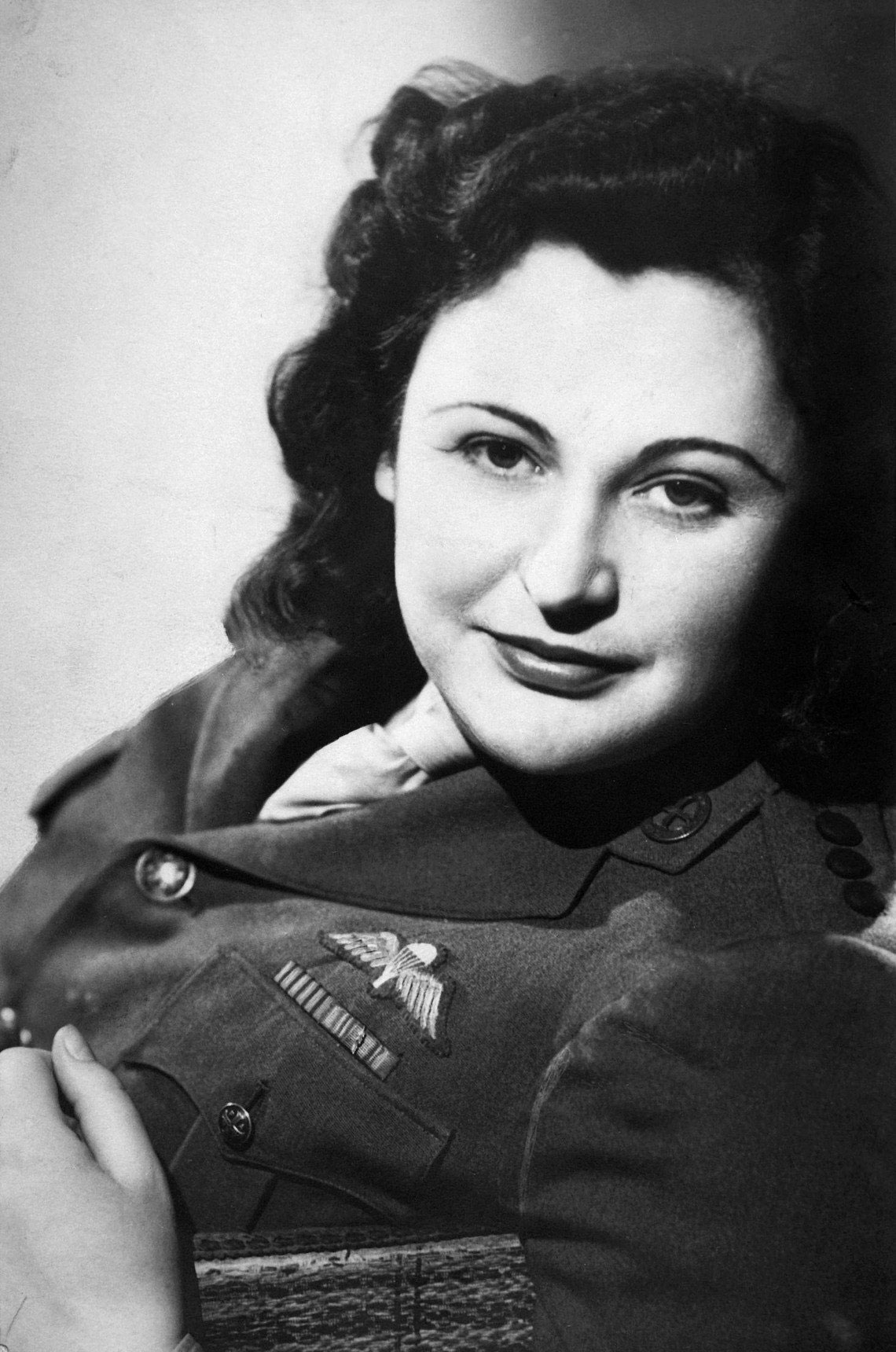
Nancy Wake in her FANY uniform

At the start of the war the FANY was led by Mary Baxter Ellis who had served with the Corps during the First World War. Helen Gwynne-Vaughan was the first Chief Controller of the newly formed Auxiliary Territorial Service (ATS). This was a role that Ellis had turned down as she preferred to lead the FANY. Ellis agreed however to supply 1,500 FANY motor mechanics to serve with the ATS as long as these FANYs could be independent. This was agreed but Gwynne-Vaughan broke the agreement and forced the FANY/ATS to be absorbed into the territorial service. Ellis demurred, but won the agreement that these FANY/ATS would wear their FANY flash, a tradition dating back many years, with the chinstrap of their hats over the crown. An autonomous FANY HQ ran simultaneously in London. These members were known as the ‘Free FANYs', and they wore their uniform as of right.

One better known role of the FANY in the Second World War is their service with the Special Operations Executive. FANYs became involved in the SOE in 1940 through the friendship between Phyllis Bingham (secretary to the then Corps commander) and Colonel, later Major-General, Colin Gubbins (Director of Operations and Training SOE). The FANYs service began with their involvement in the highly secretive Auxiliary Units set up in 1940 as a stay-behind force in case of invasion. By the end of the war over 3,000 FANYs had served with SOE; as trainers, coders, signallers, forgers, dispatchers, and, most famously, as agents. Recruits were trained in one of four fields: Motor transport, wireless telegraphy, codes or general. They worked on coding and signals, acting as conductors for agents and providing administration and technical support for the Special Training Schools. Their work was top secret and often highly skilled.

Of the 50 women sent by SOE into France 39 were members of the FANY. Of these 39 women, 12 were murdered by the Nazis and one Corps member died in the field. Many decorations, of both the UK and other countries, were awarded to FANYs for their service and outstanding courage. Among these, four of the highest UK decorations were the George Cross awarded to Odette Hallowes (who was incarcerated and tortured, but survived the war), Violette Szabo and Noor Inayat Khan (these latter two perishing in captivity and decorated posthumously). Nancy Wake's awards included the George Medal.

Corps members operated in several theatres of war, including North Africa, Italy, India and the Far East. The FANY served the Finnish Government. A section was attached to the Polish Army, based mainly in Linlithgow where they provided the Poles with uniforms, weapons, vehicles, equipment, food, administration services and drivers’ services. Corps members also provided the guard of honour at the funeral of General Wladyslaw Sikorski, who had gone up to Scotland several times to inspect his troops. A Kenyan section, formed in 1931, which was made the official East African unit by the War Office in August 1941, was very active during the war. This section took women from all over the southern half of Africa. Other FANYs were attached to the British Red Cross, the American Ambulance Corps and the French Committee for the French Red Cross. In 1944 another large group were deployed to the Indian subcontinent and the Far East with South East Asia Command. Altogether over 6,000 FANYs served in the Second World War.

Maud MacLellan, a FANY who served with the ATS during the war, taught the future Queen Elizabeth II to drive.

A memorial at St Paul's Church, Knightsbridge commemorates 52 named members who died on active service with the Corps in the First and Second World Wars, including 9 members who died when the SS Khedive Ismail was sunk by a Japanese submarine in 1944. FANYs are also commemorated on the Brookwood Memorial in Surrey.

=== Ranks of the Women's Transport Service ===
Below is a chart of WTS (FANY) ranks compared to the British Army.

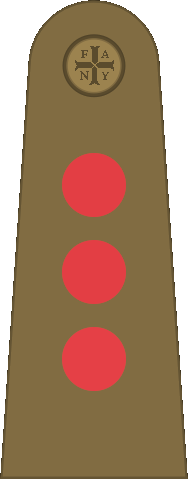
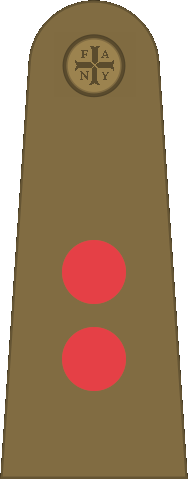
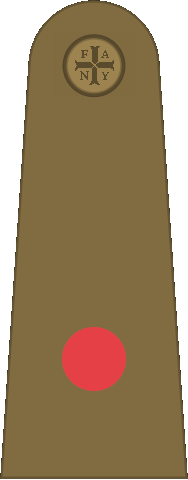
	General officers					Field officers			Junior officers
(United Kingdom) Women's Transport Service (1938–1945)
(United Kingdom) Women's Transport Service (1938–1945)						Commandant	Staff commander	Commander	Captain	Lieutenant	Ensign
(United Kingdom) British Army (1938 – 1945)
(United Kingdom) British Army (1938 – 1945)	Field Marshal	General	Lieutenant-General	Major-General	Brigadier	Colonel	Lieutenant-Colonel	Major	Captain	Lieutenant	Second Lieutenant	Officer Cadet

Rank group	Senior NCOs					Junior NCOs		Enlisted
(United Kingdom) Women's Transport Service (1938–1945)								No insignia
(United Kingdom) Women's Transport Service (1938–1945)		Warrant Officer Class II			Sergeant	Corporal	Lance Corporal	Driver
(United Kingdom) British Army (1938 – 1945)								No insignia
(United Kingdom) British Army (1938 – 1945)	Warrant Officer Class I	Warrant Officer Class II	Warrant Officer Class III	Staff/Colour Sergeant	Sergeant	Corporal	Lance Corporal	Private (or equivalent)

=== Cold War and modern role ===
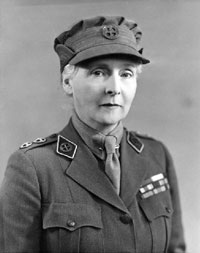
HRH Princess Alice, Countess of Athlone, in her FANY uniform

During the Cold War the FANY took on new roles including the provision of national communications support as part of 2 (National Communication) Signal Brigade. These were arrangements in place for ensuring the continuity of government in the event of a substantial attack on the United Kingdom. In such an eventuality, Corps members would have been required to assist the Brigade by deploying to one of a number of secret bunkers established around the country to house dispersed government.

The FANY was officially renamed the Princess Royal's Volunteer Corps in 1999, after being given permission by Anne, Princess Royal to use her title, and is now referred to as FANY (PRVC). The original name has greater recognition, and greater prominence even in official publications and on its website. The Princess Royal became Commandant-in-Chief of the Corps in 1981, following the death of her great great aunt Princess Alice who was the Corps's first Commandant-in-Chief in 1933.

Today, the Corps focuses on deploying specialist rapid response teams to support civil and military authorities at times of crisis. Most recently the Corps has been deployed in response to the COVID-19 pandemic, serving at NHS Nightingale Hospital London, the North London and Westminster Coroners, City of London Police and the National Emergencies Trust Coronavirus Appeal. Members train every week, and are on call 24/7 to help in times of national emergency. The Corps is open to volunteers between the ages of 18 and 45 who reside or work near London, within the M25. Members are trained in communications, first aid skills, map reading, navigation and orienteering, shooting, self-defence, survival techniques and advanced driving. They also conduct training with various military partners. Their working dress is similar to that of the modern British Army; on formal occasions they wear a uniform similar to historic female British Army Service Dress. They also have their own 'rank' system.

=== Ranks of FANY (PRVC) ===
Rank group	General / flag officers	Senior officers			Junior officers
FANY (PRVC)
FANY (PRVC)	Commandant	Deputy Commandant	Staff Commander	Commander	Captain	Lieutenant	Ensign	Cadet Ensign	Cadet Junior Ensign

== Notable members ==
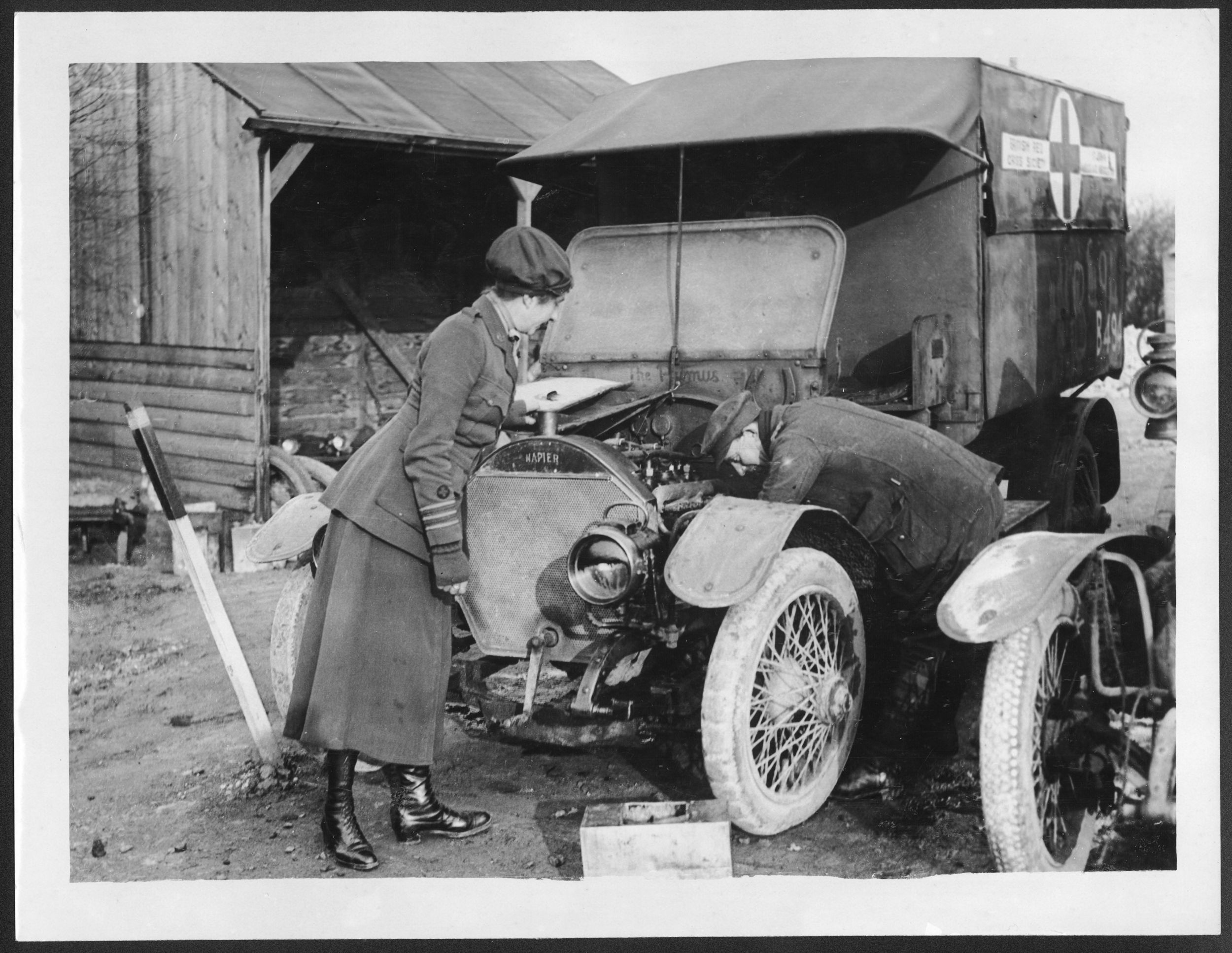
An unnamed Lady Commandant of the First Aid Nursing Yeomanry watching a mechanic fixing an ambulance, ca. 1918.

- Enid Bagnold
- Sadie Bonnell
- Evelyn May Cridlan
- Lilian Franklin
- Joan Bamford Fletcher
- Beryl Hutchinson
- Grace McDougall
- Olive Mudie-Cooke
- Muriel Thompson
- Lise de Baissac
- Denise Bloch
- Andree Borrel
- Sonya Butt
- Madeleine Damerment
- Odette Hallowes
- Noor Inayat Khan
- Cecily Lefort
- Vera Leigh
- Maud MacLellan
- Eileen Nearne
- Jacqueline Nearne
- Eliane Plewman
- Lilian Rolfe
- Yvonne Rudellat
- Sue Ryder
- Krystyna Skarbek
- Violette Szabo
- Nancy Wake
- Pearl Witherington
- Julia Pirie
- Mary Railton

== See also ==
- Auxiliary Territorial Service
- Defence Medical Welfare Service
- Mechanised Transport Corps
- Military ranks of women's services in WWII
- Queen Alexandra's Royal Army Nursing Corps
