= Mary Baxter Ellis =

British commanding officer

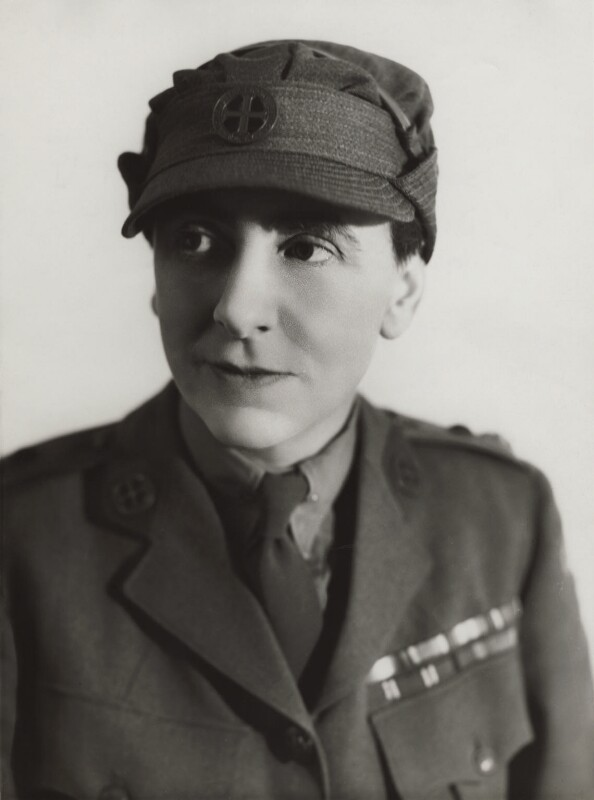
- Born: 12 November 1892; Newcastle upon Tyne, England
- Died: 12 April 1968 (aged 75); Corbridge, England
- Other name: Dick
- Education: Newcastle Central high school and University College, London
- Employer: FANY
- Known for: commanding officer of the First Aid Nursing Yeomanry
- Partner: Marjorie (Tony) Kingston Walker

Mary "Dick" Baxter Ellis CBE (12 November 1892 – 12 April 1968) was a British commanding officer of the First Aid Nursing Yeomanry, also known as FANY.

== Life ==
Ellis was born in Newcastle upon Tyne in 1892. Her mother was Mary Sharpe Taylor and her father would be made the first Lord Mayor of Newcastle in 1907 and he would in time be Sir Joseph Baxter Ellis. She was the first of their four children.

Ellis signed up to join the volunteer FANYs in 1915.

Ellis was awarded a medal in 1918 by the Queen of Belgium for her service during World War I. The FANYs in Belgium were reluctant to leave their life together and return home in 1919. Their commander Grace McDougall's decision was made for her because her mother was dangerously ill so she had to return. It fell to Ellis to demobilize the FANY's and send them "back to blighty". The decision was made after seeing soldier/mechanics returning from the war and unable to get work. It was felt that men should have the jobs. The FANY would have been completely disbanded, but the organisation escaped this because they were all volunteers. However the organisation became peripheral and it was due to leadership of Ellis and others that the FANY continued. She was leading the Northumberland section in 1928 and she rose to lead the corps in 1932 taking over from "The Boss" Lilian Franklin OBE.

Helen Gwynne-Vaughan was first made Chief Controller of the newly formed Auxiliary Territorial Service (ATS) in 1939. This was a role that Ellis had turned down as she preferred to lead the volunteer First Aid Nursing Yeomanry (FANYs). Ellis agreed however to supply 1500 women to serve with the ATS as long as they could be independent. This was agreed but Gwynne-Vaughan broke the agreement and forced the attached FANY staff to be absorbed. Gwynne-Vaughan held the role to 1941. Ellis would become a deputy-director at the ATS throughout the war. Whilst Marian Gamwell took over the leadership of the remaining FANYs and her sister took a special interest in the FANYs who ran the Special Operations Executive.

Ellis retired in 1947 and was succeeded by Maud MacLellan. Ellis went to live with her loyal friend the artist Marjorie (Tony) Kingston Walker where they painted and cared for dogs at Bellingham and West Woodburn and died in a hospital in Corbridge in 1968.
