= Mechanised Transport Corps =

British women's organisation in the Second World War

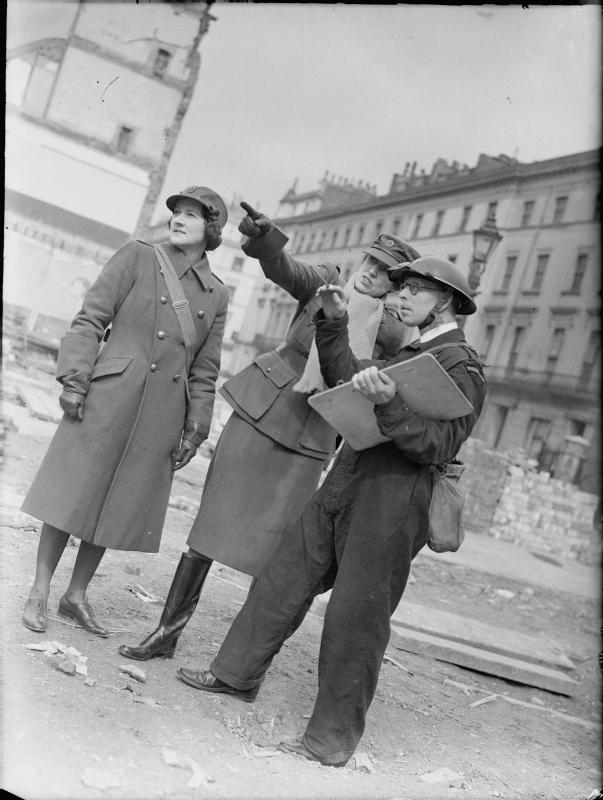
Two MTC personnel pictured with an Air Raid Precautions (ARP) warden in London in 1940

The Mechanised Transport Corps (MTC; sometimes erroneously called the Motor Transport Corps), was a British women's organisation that initially provided its own transport and uniforms and operated during the Second World War. It was a civilian uniformed organisation that provided drivers for government departments and other agencies. Among other roles, members drove staff cars, including for foreign dignitaries whose drivers were not accustomed to driving on British roads, and ambulances in the Blitz.

== History ==
The Mechanised Transport Training Corps (MTTC) was founded in 1939 by Mrs G. M. Cooke CBE as a women's voluntary civilian organisation. It was recognised by the Ministry of War Transport in 1940 and renamed the MTC, and its members were conscripted and received pay.

Various women who served with the MTC were awarded one MBE, two BEMs, nine Croix de Guerre, ten Colonial Medals, a Certificate for Gallantry, and mentions in dispatches.

Some of the best-known members were the women who volunteered to drive ambulances in France at the beginning of the war as part of Hadfield-Spears Ambulance Unit and became known as the "Spearettes". Their endeavours were held in high esteem by the French and it is said that "petulant General de Gaulle peremptorily ordered the hospital to be disbanded because the crowds at the Paris Victory Parade dared to cheer: 'Vive Spears!'"

Groups from the MTC drove ambulances and other transport in Syria, Egypt, and Palestine, as well as driving SOE agents to airfields to board the planes that would parachute them into occupied France.

A notable MTC driver was Kay Summersby, General Eisenhower's driver, who subsequently claimed that she had had an affair with him.

Despite the appearance of the character Samantha Stewart in the television series Foyle's War there is no evidence that any MTC member was ever seconded to a police force.

== Ranks of the Mechanised Transport Corps ==
Below is a chart of Mechanised Transport Corps ranks compared to the British Army.

Rank group	General / flag officers					Senior officers			Junior officers
(United Kingdom) Mechanised Transport Corps
(United Kingdom) Mechanised Transport Corps					Corps commandant	Senior commandant	Commandant	Commander	Captain	Lieutenant	Ensign
(United Kingdom) British Army (1938–1945)
(United Kingdom) British Army (1938–1945)	Field Marshal	General	Lieutenant-General	Major-General	Brigadier	Colonel	Lieutenant-Colonel	Major	Captain	Lieutenant	Second Lieutenant	Officer Cadet

Rank group	Senior NCOs					Junior NCOs		Enlisted
(United Kingdom) Mechanised Transport Corps								No insignia
(United Kingdom) Mechanised Transport Corps					Company Cadet Officer	Section Cadet Officer	Cadet Officer	Driver
(United Kingdom) British Army (1938–1945)								No insignia
(United Kingdom) British Army (1938–1945)	Warrant Officer Class I	Warrant Officer Class II	Warrant Officer Class III	Staff/Colour Sergeant	Sergeant	Corporal	Lance Corporal	Private (or equivalent)

== See also ==
- First Aid Nursing Yeomanry
- Auxiliary Territorial Service
- Military ranks of women's services in WWII
