= Beryl Hutchinson =

British volunteer ambulance driver and officer of the First Aid Nursing Yeomanry

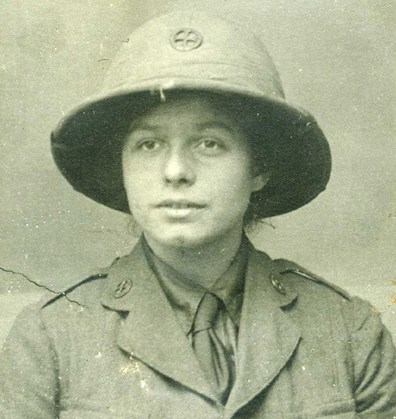
- Born: 22 August 1892; Spotland
- Died: 6 November 1981 (aged 89); Kensington
- Known for: Member of the FANY and palmist

Beryl Hutchinson MBE (22 August 1892 – 6 November 1981) was a British volunteer ambulance driver and officer of the First Aid Nursing Yeomanry. After the war she became Life President of the Society for Study of Physiological Patterns (Palmistry).

== Life ==
Hutchinson was born in Spotland near Rochdale to Florence Mark and Robert Arthur Lord Hutchinson. Her father was a woollen manufacturer. She was driving at the age of 13 and she attended Highfield Ladies’ School in Hendon.

In 1914 she joined the First Aid Nursing Yeomanry known as the FANYs. She went to France on the first day of 1915. The FANYs were all volunteers who paid to be in the organisation. Hutchinson said she went to France because she supplied a mobile kitchen although it was compared to a hen shed on a Ford chassis.

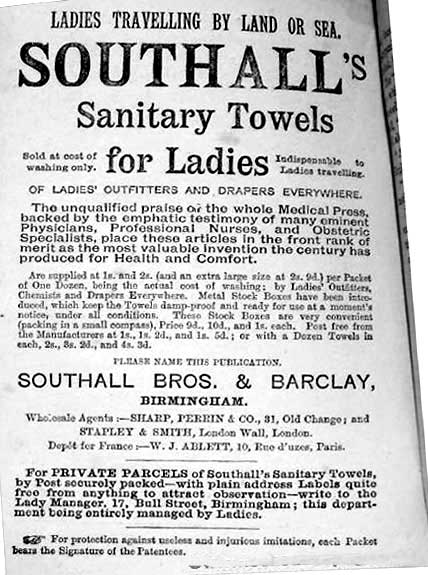
Southall's Sanitary Towels for Ladies

In May 1915 she was involved in looking after the casualties during the first gas attack. The suffering were trying to gain relief by having their faces washed with scraps of cotton wool soaked in vinegar. It was the FANYs idea to use sanitary towels as a more substantial replacement. The actual brand was "Mr Southall's conveniences for ladies" which they cut in half before soaking the pads in Rimmell's Toilet Vinegar. She rose to be second in command of the FANY–VAD St Omer convoy helping to evacuate the wounded under fire. In 1919 she was awarded an MBE for her war service.

During the Second World War she returned to the FANY and was put in command of the 8th (London) motor transport company. She and her unit were moved to the ATS. In 1945 she and Noel Jaquin founded an organisation for those interested in palmistry, astrology and similar studies. In 1971 she became Life President of the Society for Study of Physiological Patterns. She was quoted as an expert in books on the subject.

Hutchinson died in Kensington on 30 July 1981.
