= Joan Bamford Fletcher =

Canadian member of the First Aid Nursing Yeomanry

Joan Bamford Fletcher MBE
- Born: Joan Bamford Fletcher; July 12, 1909; Regina, Saskatchewan, Canada
- Died: April 30, 1979 (aged 69); Langley, British Columbia, Canada
- Military career
- Allegiance: United Kingdom
- Branch: First Aid Nursing Yeomanry
- Rank: Lieutenant
- Conflicts: Second World War
- Awards: Member of the Order of the British Empire

Joan Bamford Fletcher (July 12, 1909 – April 30, 1979) was a Canadian member of the First Aid Nursing Yeomanry. In 1945, Fletcher commanded a force of surrendered Japanese soldiers and used them to escort 2,000 Dutch civilian captives from a civilian internment camp at Bangkinang, Dutch East Indies (now Indonesia) to safety. Fletcher was appointed a Member of the Order of the British Empire (MBE) for her services. The 2001 documentary Rescue from Sumatra is based on her actions.

== Early life ==
Fletcher was born in Regina, Saskatchewan in 1909, the daughter of British immigrants. Her father's family had been successful cotton merchants and she was sent to a boarding school in England. She later studied at Les Tourelles in Brussels, Belgium, and also in France.

When Fletcher returned to Canada, she worked in the Regina office of the Prairie Farm Rehabilitation Administration and helped her father breed and raise horses.

== Military career ==
When the Second World War broke out in 1939, Fletcher trained as a driver in the transport section of the Canadian Red Cross and studied motor mechanics in the Saskatchewan Auxiliary Territorial Service, a women's voluntary wartime organization. In early 1941, paying her own expenses, she travelled to Britain and joined the Women's Transport Service (First Aid Nursing Yeomanry) (WTS (FANY)). Fletcher was stationed with other Canadian FANYs at Moncreiffe House in Scotland, where she drove cars and ambulances for the exiled Polish army.

=== Sumatra ===
In 1945, as the war was drawing to a close in Europe, Fletcher was assigned to Southeast Asia to help evacuate Allied captives. She arrived in Calcutta, India, in April 1945. She left Calcutta on a hospital ship that crossed the Bay of Bengal and sailed through the Strait of Malacca toward Singapore. Her convoy slowly made its way single-file through mine-invested waters and Fletcher did not arrive in Singapore until September 2. From there, she travelled to prison camps to care for sick internees and was appointed personal assistant to the brigadier in command, with the rank of lieutenant. In October, Fletcher was dispatched to the Dutch East Indies – now Indonesia – to evacuate the civilian internment camp at Bangkinang in Sumatra.

At that time, approximately 100,000 soldiers and civilians remained in prison camps throughout the Dutch East Indies. Prisoners of war and civilian internees had been subjected to starvation, forced labour, and torture. Malaria, dysentery, tropical sores, and malnutrition-related diseases were rampant. The camp at Bangkinang contained approximately 2,000 emaciated prisoners – mostly women and children – who had to be transported to the coastal city of Padang. However, the Allies had no personnel available in the region at the time.

Further complicating the matter, while the Japanese had surrendered in mid-August, the Allied forces did not reach the Dutch East Indies until September 29. The power vacuum between the end of the war and the arrival of Allied troops had given Indonesian nationalists time to assume control and they declared independence on August 17. The situation in Indonesia was chaotic and rebel groups, many of them trained by the Japanese, had started attacking prisoners, mostly Dutch.

Fletcher approached the local headquarters of the Japanese 25th Army and persuaded the Japanese army to provide her with an interpreter, 15 trucks, and an escort of 40 armed soldiers. She was able to increase the convoy size to 25 vehicles after she salvaged some broken-down trucks from the camp. The route from Bangkinang to Padang involved a hazardous journey through 450 kilometres of rugged jungle and mountains as high as 1,525 metres. Because of the limited number of vehicles, convoys could transport only a small number of internees at a time. In all, transporting the 2,000 internees would require 21 trips over a six-week span. Each trip took approximately 20 hours.

Fletcher monitored each of the convoys, driving back and forth looking for problems such as barricades, sabotaged bridges, and hazardous road conditions. On the third convoy, Fletcher was left with a four-inch gash in her scalp when her coat snagged on the wheel of a passing truck and she was dragged under. A Japanese physician bandaged her wound and, within two hours of the accident, she carried on with the evacuation. Following the incident, her interpreter informed her that she had earned the respect of the Japanese soldiers – who now saluted her whenever she passed – but they had collectively decided they would never marry a European woman, as they were deemed “too tough”.

When the monsoon rains arrived, trips became more dangerous, as the roads turned into muddy bogs. As the security situation intensified, rebels began barricading the roads. Fletcher directed that a “crash car” with a special bumper lead the convoy and crash through the barricades. The Japanese started increasing the size of their escort and, by the final convoy, Fletcher's guard was increased to 70 Japanese soldiers armed with machine guns mounted on trucks. Despite the threat of attack, Fletcher did not carry a firearm and she later noted in an interview that she did not know how to use one.

On the second-last trip, Fletcher and a Japanese officer were leading the convoy in a jeep. After halting to fix a tire along the column, Fletcher returned to the front to discover that two Dutch passengers in the lead car were missing and an Indonesian rebel was attempting to steal the vehicle. She pulled alongside the car in her jeep and shouted, “Out!” The rebel jumped out of the vehicle and ran off. Fletcher and her interpreter went in search of the missing evacuees and found them being held captive in a hut by three armed Indonesian rebels. While the interpreter was attempting to convince the rebels that the captives were actually British, Fletcher reportedly shouted at them and, while they were taken aback, grabbed a knife, cut the captives lose, and ushered them out the door. The rebels made no attempt to stop them and the group escaped unharmed.

When the evacuation was complete, the captain of the Japanese transport company that had lent their vehicles presented her with a family heirloom – a 300-year-old Samurai sword.

After a week in Padang, Fletcher flew to Singapore and was assigned to Hong Kong at the end of November 1945. Three weeks later, she was admitted to hospital with a severe case of swamp fever. She returned to England in July 1946, but the disease resurfaced, spreading to her jawbone. Half of her lower teeth were removed and part of her left jawbone was replaced with plastic.

=== Poland ===
Fletcher had learned Polish while she was stationed with the Polish army in Scotland. In 1947, she travelled to Poland where she served with the Information Section of the British Embassy in Warsaw. By this time, however, the Cold War had intensified and foreign embassies in Poland had become targets of suspicion by the Polish secret police, as they were thought to be shelters for spies and saboteurs.

In 1950, Fletcher was caught up in a political controversy where a former British attaché, Group Captain Claude Henry Turner, had been accused of persuading a young Polish girl to leave the country illegally. In May, Fletcher reportedly received a phone call informing her that the secret police were after her. She quickly burned her address book and fled the country in a Royal Air Force courier plane. She later told reporters she believed she had “escaped the Communist dragnet by six hours.” Details of Fletcher's duties during that period are protected by the Official Secrets Act.

== Later life ==
After fleeing Poland, Fletcher rejoined her family in Canada who, by this time, lived in Vancouver, British Columbia. She kept in touch with her Japanese translator, Art Miyazawa. She died in 1979 in Langley. Following her death, Miyazawa wrote to her sister, telling her about a reunion with the veterans she had led. He wrote:

“Virtually every veteran present recalled the tough but fair-minded woman lieutenant who amazed our troops with her consummate knowledge and expertise in handling the assignment at hand.”

Miyazawa further noted that Fletcher's actions had exempted his unit, the Yamashita Butai, from serving a year of hard labour, a penalty many Japanese soldiers faced after the war. He stated that the unit's honour roll of deceased veterans now included her name.

== Awards and legacy ==
In October 1946, Fletcher was appointed a Member of the Order of the British Empire (Civil Division) for her services in the Far East. The MBE medal was presented to her by the British ambassador to Poland.

The 2001 documentary Rescue from Sumatra commemorates Fletcher's actions.

Fletcher's sword and war medals are in the collection of the Canadian War Museum.
