= All Saints' Church, Maidenhead =

English place of worship

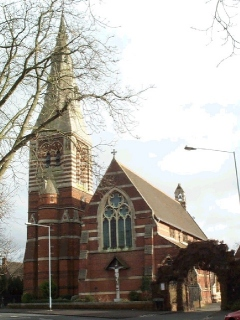
- All Saints' Church, Maidenhead
- All Saints' Church, Maidenhead
- 51°31′12″N 00°44′13″W
- Denomination: Church of England
- Churchmanship: Anglo Catholic
- Website: www.allsaintsboynehill.org.uk

History
- Dedication: All Saints

Administration
- Province: Canterbury
- Diocese: Oxford
- Parish: Maidenhead

Clergy
- Vicar: Revd Jeremy Harris

All Saints' Church at Boyne Hill is a Grade I listed Church of England parish church in Maidenhead in the English county of Berkshire.

== Background ==
The church, completed in 1857, is one of the finest examples of the early work of the architect G. E. Street. The complex consists of the church surrounded on the south side by the Old Vicarage, former school and two clergy houses. On the south-west boundary there is an almshouse.

The church was founded in the Anglo-Catholic tradition of the Church of England and remains within that today. The first incumbent was the prominent high churchman William Gresley, from 1857 until he died in 1876.

Sgt Major Grace McDougall was said to be the first bride to marry whilst wearing khaki at her wedding here on 22 January 1915.

The font cover was donated by the family of William Bissley, who was killed at the Somme 1916. The cover was made by B. Fellowes-Prynne of Messrs. Hartson and Peard.

== Organ ==
The church contains a pipe organ by J. W. Walker & Sons Ltd, dating from 1879. Its specifications can be found in the National Pipe Organ Register.

== Importance for art history ==
In 2007, the architectural historian James Stevens Curl placed All Saints' Church among five worthwhile British buildings in which "it is still possible to experience something of the Victorian mastery of colour, detail, and architectural grandeur," along with the Palace of Westminster, Westminster Cathedral, All Saints' Church in Margaret Street and the Church of Christ the Consoler at Skelton-on-Ure.
