= Marian Gamwell =

English nurse, ambulance driver, and farmer

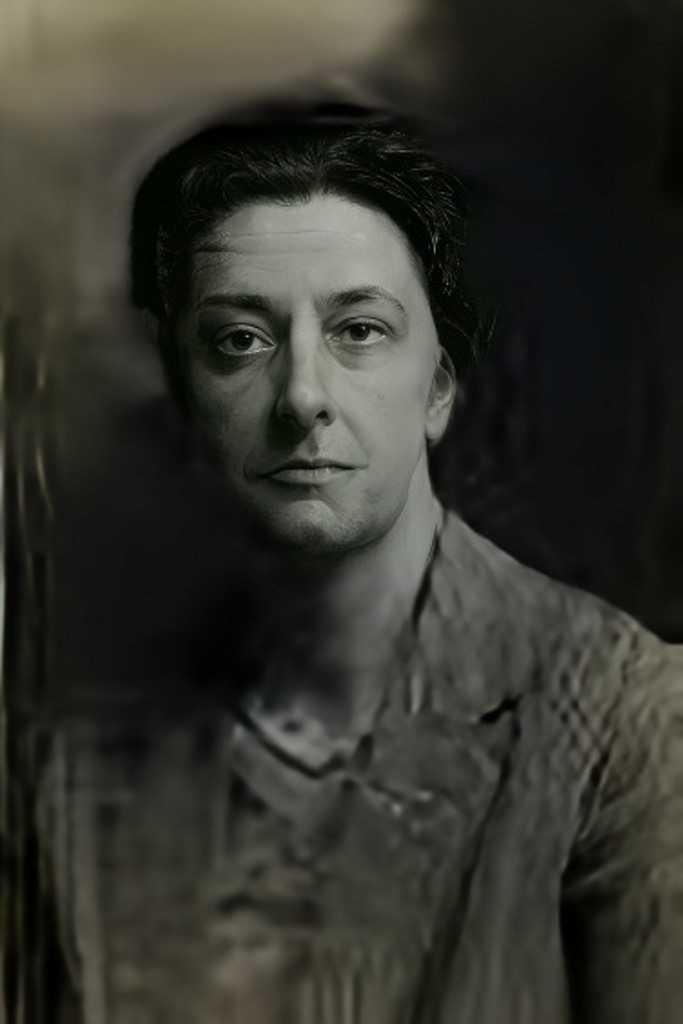
- Born: Antonia Marian Gamwell; 28 July 1891; West Norwood, England, United Kingdom of Great Britain and Ireland
- Died: 13 May 1977 (aged 85); Jersey, UK
- Education: Roedean School
- Parent(s): Frederick Robison Gamwell and Marian Antonia Bankart

(Antonia) Marian Gamwell OBE (28 July 1891 – 13 May 1977) was a United Kingdom volunteer ambulance driver and commanding officer of the First Aid Nursing Yeomanry (FANY). She served with her sister Hope Gamwell during World War I and they then ran a farm in what is now Zambia. They both became pilots. They returned to the UK for World War Two and Marian commanded the FANYs after a row with the ATS. After the war they returned to Zambia before retiring to Jersey.

== Life ==
Gamwell was born in West Norwood to Frederick Robison Gamwell and Marian Antonia Bankart in 1891. Her sister (Anne) Hope Gamwell was born in 1893. Her brother, Frederick Whittington Gamwell, was one of the pilots awarded an Aviator's Certificate by the Royal Aero Club in 1914. Her father had been a partner in a London business trading in Hong Kong, China and Japan until 1896. She and her sister's education was at Roedean School and after that they taught themselves mechanics by taking their mothers car to bits. In 1910 Marian tried to study architecture but she was rejected because she was a woman. She did work with animals before going to Saskatchewan where she worked in a mixed farm until she returned to the UK in 1912.

After the start of WWI, Marian, Hope and their mother travelled to France at the suggestion of Dr Elsie Inglis where they helped clean up and prepare the abbey at Abbaye de Royaumont to be a hospital. The Scottish Women's Hospital that was established there operated throughout the war, but in May 1915 the two sisters volunteered to join the First Aid Nursing Yeomanry. Their mother returned to her home in Wales where she established a home for wounded soldiers at Aber Artro Hall near Llanbedr. Before she left France, her mother left funds that enabled an ambulance and a mobile bath Daimler to be purchased for the first FANY hospital, which is where they and the vehicles were based, at the hospital they call "Lamarck" in Calais. In April 1918, Marian had to return home due to suspected appendicitis but when recovered she went to work in a munitions factory for Rolls-Royce.

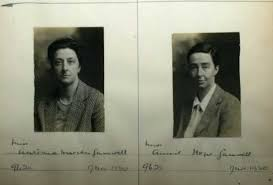
They returned to the UK and gained pilots licences in 1930

Between the wars the two sisters ran a coffee farm in Northern Rhodesia (Zambia) at a place called Abercorn, now Mbala. The called their land "Chilongolwelo" and it was just under 1,000 acres at the southern end of Lake Tanganyika. They were there until the FANY called them back because of the onset of World War Two. Hope went immediately and Marian stayed back to close down the farm. Marian, who was the natural leader, arrived in 1940.

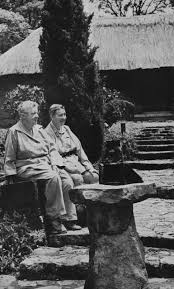
Marian and Hope Gamwell sisters in 1964 at Abercorn (now called Mbala)

Marian would command the FANYs after a row with the Auxiliary Territorial Service (ATS). The row was with Helen Gwynne-Vaughan who was Chief Controller of the ATS which had been formed in 1939. This was a role that the FANY commander, Mary Baxter Ellis, had turned down as she preferred to lead the FANYs. Ellis agreed to supply 1500 women to serve with the ATS as long as they could be independent of the ATS. This was agreed but Gwynne-Vaughan broke the agreement and forced the attached FANY staff to be absorbed. Gwynne-Vaughan held the role to 1941. Ellis swallowed her pride and become a deputy-director at the ATS throughout the war. Whilst Marian took over the leadership of the remaining FANYs and her sister, Hope, took a special interest in the FANYs who ran the Special Operations Executive.

After the war the two sisters returned to Zambia where they reopened their farm. They grew crops that were not coffee. They were there until 1964 when they decided to retire together to live on Jersey. Marian and Hope Gamwell died on Jersey.
