= Military ranks of women's services in WWII =

The Military ranks of Women's Services in WWII are the military insignia used by the various all female military services and units during World War II.

== Germany ==
=== Wehrmacht ===
The first female auxiliary service in the Wehrmacht was the Army signals communications female auxiliaries, formed on 1 October 1940. Others followed suit, in the army and in the other services. Until December 1941, recruitment was by volunteer enlistment, but by that date unmarried women in the age group 18–40 years could be drafted into auxiliary service. All female auxiliary services were uniformed and under military discipline, with free rations, quarters and clothing. Yet, they were paid according to civil service pay rates and were not considered members of the armed forces, but auxiliaries of the armed forces. Their ranks did not correspond to military ranks.

=== Army ===
Nachrichtenhelferinnen (NH) des Heeres

Army signals communications female auxiliaries.

Insignia (1940–1942)										No insignia
Insignia (1940–1942)			NH-Hauptführerin	NH-Oberführerin	NH-Führerin	NH-Unterführerin		NH-Oberhelferin		Nachrichtenhelferin
Insignia (1942–1945)										No insignia
Insignia (1942–1945)	NH-Oberstabsführerin	NH-Stabsführerin	NH-Hauptführerin	NH-Oberführerin	NH-Führerin	NH-Unterführerin	NH-Haupthelferin	NH-Oberhelferin	NH-Vorhelferin	Nachrichtenhelferin

=== Navy ===
Insignia									No insignia
Insignia	Marineoberstabsführerin	Marinestabsführerin	Marinehaubtführerin	Marineoberführerin	Marineführerin	Marinehaupthelferin	Marineoberhelferin	Marinevorhelferin	Marinehelferin

=== Air force ===
Flugmeldediensthelferinnen (FMDH)

Female air warning service auxiliaries

Insignia (6 July 1940–2 August 1940)						No insignia
Insignia (6 July 1940–2 August 1940)		Hauptgruppenführerin (Senior work group officer)	Betriebsgruppenführerin (Work group officer)	Aufsicht (Warden, supervisor)	Helferin (Female auxiliary)	Anwärterin (Applicant)
Insignia (2 August 1940–26 February 1941)						No insignia
Insignia (2 August 1940–26 February 1941)	Kameradschaftsführerin (Comradeship leader)	Betriebsgruppenführerin (Work group officer)	Betriebsgruppenunterführerin (Work group junior officer)	Aufsichtshelferin (Female supervisor auxiliary)	Flugmeldehelferin (Female air warning auxiliary)	Anwärterin (Applicant)

On 26 February 1941, the Flugmelde-Helferinnen were incorporated into the Luftnachrichtenhelferinnen (Luftwaffe female signals communications auxiliaries).

Luftnachrichtenhelferinnen (LNH)

Insignia
Luftnachrichten-Flugmelde	Luftnachrichten-Flugmelde-Stabsführerin	Luftnachrichten-Flugmelde-Hauptführerin	Luftnachrichten-Flugmelde-Oberführerin	Luftnachrichten-Flugmelde-Führerin
Luftnachrichten-Betriebs			Luftnachrichten-Betriebs-Oberführerin	Luftnachrichten-Betriebs-Führerin
Insignia
Luftnachrichten-Flugmelde	Luftnachrichten-Flugmelde-Haupthelferin (major plane spotter auxiliary)	Luftnachrichten-Flugmelde-Oberhelferin (senior plane spotter auxiliary)	Luftnachrichten-Flugmelde-Helferin (plane spotter auxiliary)	Luftnachrichten-Flugmelde-Anwärterin (applicant)
Luftnachrichten-Betriebs	Luftnachrichten-Betriebs-Haupthelferin (major plane spotter auxiliary)	Luftnachrichten-Betriebs-Oberhelferin (senior plane spotter auxiliary)	Luftnachrichten-Betriebs-Helferin (plane spotter auxiliary)	Luftnachrichten-Betriebs-Anwärterin (applicant)

Flakwaffenhelferinnen

Female anti-aircraft auxiliaries 1944.

Insignia								No insignia
Insignia	Flakw. Stabsführerin	Flakw. Hauptführerin	Flakw. Oberführerin	Flakw. Führerin	Flakw. Obertruppführerin	Flakw. Truppführerin	Flakw. Oberhelferin	Flakw. Helferin

Luftschutzwarndiensthelferinnen

Civil defence air-raid warning service female auxiliaries.

Insignia					No insignia
Insignia	LS-Warndienst-Oberführerin	LS-Warndienst-Führerin	LS-Warndienst-Hapthelferin	LS-Warndienst-Oberhelferin	LS-Warndienst-Helferin

=== Wehrmachthelferinnenkorps ===
On 29 November 1944 all female auxiliary organizations, except the Civil defence air-raid warning service female auxiliaries, were merged into one corps, the Wehrmacht Female Auxiliary Corps.

Insignia										No insignia
Insignia	Oberstabsführerin	Stabsführerin	Hauptdienstführerin	Oberdienstführerin	Dienstführerin	Obertruppführerin	Truppführerin	Haupthelferin	Oberhelferin	Helferin

=== Ordnungspolizei ===
Helferinnen der Ordnungspolizei

During the war, the female civilian employees of the Ordnungspolizei were augmented with drafted female police auxiliaries; Stabshelferinnen performed office work, Nachrichtenhelferinnen worked with signals communications, while Kraftfahrhelferinnen drove automobiles.

Rank insignia for Female Police Auxiliaries was introduced in 1944. The three ranks were Führerin, Unterführerin and Helferin.

Feuerwehr-Helferinnen

Female fire fighting auxiliaries were drafted into the fire service from 1943.

Rank insignia for Female Fire Fighting Auxiliaries was introduced in 1944.

Insignia					No insignia
Insignia	Kreishelferin d. Fw.	Unterkreishelferin d. Fw.	Haupthelferin d. Fw.	Oberhelferin d. Fw.	Helferin d. Fw.

=== Paramilitary ===
==== Female Reich Labour Service, Auxiliary War Service ====
During the war, the six months mandatory service in the Female Reich Labour Service was extended with another six months in the Kriegshilfsdienst (the auxiliary war service). The auxiliary war service of RAD was prolonged with another six months in April 1944, and at the end of November all time limits for service were removed. The majority of the additional draft of 150,000 young women were to serve in the Luftwaffe air defenses. They should not be confused with the Flakwaffenhelferinnen of the Luftwaffe. They formed special RAD-Flak units with RAD uniforms. While female Wehrmacht personnel saw extensive deployment throughout German-occupied Europe, members of the RAD Auxiliary War Service only served within the borders of Germany.

Insignia										No insignia
Insignia	Stabshauptführerin*	Stabsoberführerin*	Stabsführerin*	Maidenhauptführerin*	Maidenoberführerin*	Maidenführerin*	Maidenunterführerin*	Jungführerin	Kameradschaftsälteste	Arbeitsmaid
* = professional leaders

== Italian Social Republic ==
Officers

Rank group	General / flag officers	Senior officers			Junior officers
(Italian Social Republic) Female Auxiliary Service
(Italian Social Republic) Female Auxiliary Service	Comandante generale	Vice comandante generale	Ispettrice	Comandante raggruppamento	Comandante provinciale	Vice comandante provinciale	Comandante di gruppo

Enlisted

Rank group	Senior NCOs		Junior NCOs	Enlisted
(Italian Social Republic) Female Auxiliary Service					No insignia
(Italian Social Republic) Female Auxiliary Service	Capo nucleo	Vice capo nucleo		Ausiliaria scelta	Ausiliaria

== United Kingdom ==
Officers

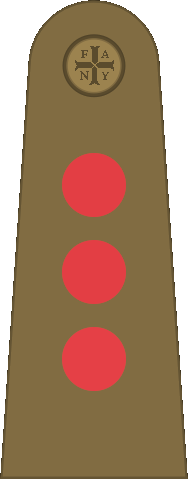
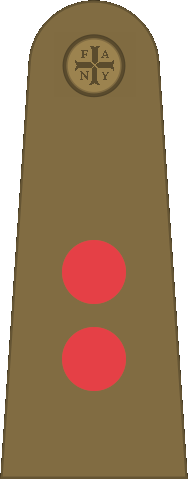
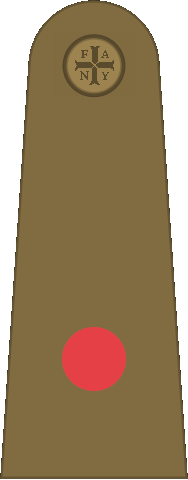
Rank group	General / flag officers		Senior officers			Junior officers
(United Kingdom) Women's Transport Service (1938–1945)
(United Kingdom) Women's Transport Service (1938–1945)			Commandant	Staff commander	Commander	Captain	Lieutenant	Ensign
(United Kingdom) Auxiliary Territorial Service (1938–1941)
(United Kingdom) Auxiliary Territorial Service (1938–1941)	Chief controller	Senior controller	Controller	Chief commandant	Senior commandant	Company commander	Deputy company commander	Company assistant
(United Kingdom) Auxiliary Territorial Service (1941–1949)
(United Kingdom) Auxiliary Territorial Service (1941–1949)	Chief controller	Senior controller	Controller	Chief commander	Senior commander	Junior commander	Subaltern	Second subaltern
(United Kingdom) Mechanised Transport Corps
(United Kingdom) Mechanised Transport Corps		Corps commandant	Senior commandant	Commandant	Commander	Captain	Lieutenant	Ensign
Rank group	General / flag officers		Senior officers			Junior officers
Women's Auxiliary Air Force (1939–1940)
Women's Auxiliary Air Force (1939–1940)		Senior controller	Controller	Chief commandant	Senior commandant	Company commander	Deputy company commander	Company assistant
Women's Auxiliary Air Force (1940–1949)
Women's Auxiliary Air Force (1940–1949)	Air Chief Commandant (Note: created 1943 with first appointment.)	Air Commandant	Group Officer	Wing Officer	Squadron Officer	Flight Officer	Section Officer	Assistant Section Officer
Women's Royal Naval Service
(1939–1940)	Director		Deputy director	Superintendent	Chief officer	First officer	Second officer
(1941–1945)	Director		Superintendent	Chief officer	First officer	Second officer	Third officer
Rank group	General / flag officers		Senior officers			Junior officers

Other ranks

Rank group	Senior NCOs				Junior NCOs		Enlisted
(United Kingdom) Women's Transport Service (1938–1945)							No insignia
(United Kingdom) Women's Transport Service (1938–1945)		Warrant Officer Class II		Sergeant	Corporal	Lance Corporal	Driver
(United Kingdom) Auxiliary Territorial Service (1938–1941)							No insignia
(United Kingdom) Auxiliary Territorial Service (1938–1941)		Senior Leader		Section Leader	Sub-Leader	Chief Volunteer	Volunteer
(United Kingdom) Auxiliary Territorial Service (1941–1949)							No insignia
(United Kingdom) Auxiliary Territorial Service (1941–1949)	Warrant Officer Class I	Warrant Officer Class II	Staff Sergeant	Sergeant	Corporal; Bombardier (Note: used when assigned to AAC batteries)	Lance Corporal; Lance Bombardier (Note: used when assigned to AAC batteries)	Private; Gunner (Note: used when assigned to AAC batteries)
(United Kingdom) Mechanised Transport Corps							No insignia
(United Kingdom) Mechanised Transport Corps				Company Cadet Officer	Section Cadet Officer	Cadet Officer	Driver
Rank group	Senior NCOs				Junior NCOs		Enlisted
Women's Auxiliary Air Force (1939–1940)							No insignia
Women's Auxiliary Air Force (1939–1940)			Senior Section Leader	Section Leader	Assistant Section Leader		Aircraftwoman 1st Class	Aircraftwoman 2nd Class
Women's Auxiliary Air Force (1940–1942)							No insignia
Women's Auxiliary Air Force (1940–1942)	Under officer		Senior sergeant	Sergeant	Corporal		Aircraftwoman 1st Class	Aircraftwoman 2nd Class Template:Ranks and Insignia of NATO Air Forces/OR/WAAF 1942–1949
(United Kingdom) Women's Royal Naval Service (1939–1952)
(United Kingdom) Women's Royal Naval Service (1939–1952)			Chief Wren	Petty Officer Wren	Leading Wren		Wren	Ordinary Wren
Rank group	Senior NCOs				Junior NCOs		Enlisted

== Bibliography ==
- Absalon, Rudolf (1995). Die Wehrmacht im Dritten Reich: 19. Dezember 1941 bis 9. Mai 1945 (in German). H. Boldt. ISBN 978-3764619404.
- Cassin-Scott, Jack (1980). Women at War. Osprey Publishing. ISBN 978-0850453492.
- Davis, Brian L. (2001). Uniforms and Insignia of the Luftwaffe, Vol 2 (in German). Stuttgart: Motorbuch Verlag. ISBN 978-1854091079.
- Deuster, Dieter (2009). Deutsche Polizei-Uniformen 1936-1945 (in German). Motorbuch Verlag. ISBN 978-3613031050.
- Heineman, Elisabeth D. (1999). What Difference Does a Husband Make?: Women and Marital Status in Nazi and Postwar Germany. University of California Press. ISBN 978-0520937314.
- Kompisch, Kathrin (2008). Täterinnen: Frauen im Nationalsozialismus (in German). Böhlau Verlag. ISBN 978-3412201883.
- Krimmer, Elisabeth (2018). German Women's Life Writing and the Holocaust. Cambridge University Press. ISBN 978-1108563758.
- Maubach, Franka (2009). Die Stellung halten: Kriegserfahrungen und Lebensgeschichten von Wehrmachthelferinnen (in German). Vandenhoek & Ruprecht. ISBN 978-3525361672.
- Amtliches Werk (1943). Reichsgesetzblatt Teil I (in German). Reichsministerium des Innern.
- Schlicht, Adolf; Angolia, John R. (1999). Die deutsche Wehrmacht - Uniformierung und Ausrüstung 1933-1945, Band 3: Die Luftwaffe (in German). Stuttgart: Motorbuch Verlag. ISBN 978-3613020016.
- United States War Department (1945). Handbook on German military forces, part I (TM-E 30-451). Washington, DC: United States Government Printing Office.
- Williamson, Gordon (2003). World War II German Women's Auxiliary Services. Osprey Publishing. ISBN 978-1841764078.
