= Margaret Chase =

American Red Cross worker (1905–1997)

Margaret Camajani
- Born: Margaret Chase; October 13, 1905
- Died: October 4, 1997 (aged 91)

Margaret Alma Chase Camajani (October 13, 1905 – October 4, 1997) was an American Red Cross recreation club worker during World War II. From August 1942 to May 1945 she was assigned to England and North Africa near General Dwight D. Eisenhower's headquarters.

== Biography ==
Chase graduated from the University of California, Berkeley circa 1927 and then taught art in several high schools in California. In early 1942, she was an art teacher working at Lowell High School before she began working with the American Red Cross.

Chase was initially sent to Naples, Italy as a Red Cross volunteer. Chase was friends with Ernest "Tex" Lee during most of this time. In 1944, Chase described her boat trip across the Atlantic, air raids, and how soldiers wanted to be clean and eat after they return from battle. That year she became a member of the board of the San Luis Obispo, California chapter of the Red Cross.

In her 1983 book Never Too Late, Chase joined other authors who discounted the idea that Kay Summersby and Dwight D. Eisenhower had a love affair.

At the age of 60, Chase married Giovanni Camajani.

== Selected publications ==
- Chase, Margaret (1983). Never too late. San Francisco, CA: Ausonia Press. ISBN 0-912429-00-3. OCLC 10099747.
