= Mary Railton =

British army officer (1906–1992)

Brigadier Dame Mary Railton, DBE (28 May 1906 – 12 November 1992) was a senior British Army officer. She served as Director of the Women's Royal Army Corps (WRAC) from 1954 to 1957, and its Deputy Controller Commandant from 1961 to 1967. She had joined the First Aid Nursing Yeomanry as a driver in 1938, and at the outbreak of the Second World War was a corporal in the WRAC's predecessor, the Auxiliary Territorial Service (ATS): she was the first WRAC director to have served in the other ranks.

From 4 September 1954 to 2 October 1957, she was an Honorary Aide-de-Camp to the Queen (ADC). In the 1956 Queen's Birthday Honours, she was appointed Dame Commander of the Order of the British Empire (DBE).
