= Kay Summersby =

British chauffeur and secretary to Dwight D. Eisenhower (1908–1975)

Kay Summersby BEM
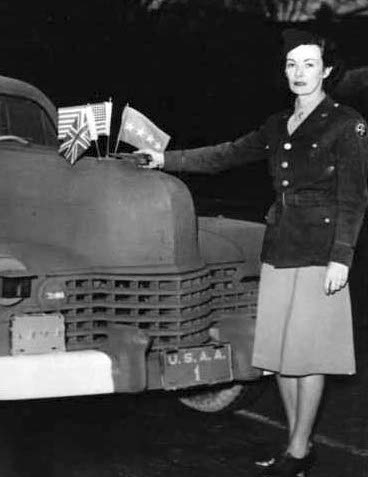
- Summersby in 1944
- Born: Kathleen Helen MacCarthy-Morrogh; 23 November 1908; County Cork, Ireland
- Died: 20 January 1975 (aged 66); Southampton, New York, U.S.
- Burial place: Church of the Sacred Heart, Rath (Baltimore, County Cork); 51°30′10″N 9°21′00″W
- Spouse: Gordon Thomas Summersby (m. 1936; div. 1943)
- Military career
- Allegiance: United Kingdom; United States
- Branch: Mechanised Transport Corps (UK); Women's Army Corps (US)
- Service years: 1939–1947
- Rank: Captain
- Conflicts: World War II
- Awards: Bronze Star Medal; Women's Army Corps Service Medal; European Campaign Medal; World War II Victory Medal; Army of Occupation Medal; British Empire Medal

External image
- Bust portraits of Dwight D. Eisenhower and Kay Summersby Morgan

Kathleen Helen Summersby BEM (née MacCarthy-Morrogh; 23 November 1908 – 20 January 1975), known as Kay Summersby, was an Irish member of the British Mechanised Transport Corps during World War II, who served as a chauffeur and later as personal secretary to Dwight D. Eisenhower during his period as Supreme Commander Allied Expeditionary Force in command of the Allied forces in North West Europe.

Summersby and Eisenhower spent a significant amount of time together until World War II ended, at which time Eisenhower cut ties and returned to the United States. It is generally agreed that Summersby and Eisenhower became extremely close during the war; some writers have suggested a sexual relationship between the two, although people who knew both of them at the time have rejected that claim, as have most of Eisenhower's biographers.

== Early life ==
Summersby was born in Ballydehob, County Cork, Ireland. She was the daughter of Donald Florence MacCarthy-Morrogh and Vera Mary MacCarthy-Morrogh (née Hutchinson). Her father, descended from the MacCarthy Reagh princes of Carbery, was originally from County Kerry, and her mother was born in Wales, as the fourth of five sisters, to an English father and Irish mother who was also descended from the Morrogh family.

She described her father, a retired lieutenant colonel of the Royal Munster Fusiliers, as "black Irish" and her mother as English. As a young woman, she moved to London where she worked as a film studio extra, dabbled in photography, and eventually became a fashion model. She was married in 1936 to British Army officer Gordon Thomas Summersby. When they divorced in 1943, she retained the name of her ex-husband, as is usual. There was an engagement to marry Lieutenant Colonel Richard "Dick" Arnold of the US Army that overlapped her initial period with Eisenhower; however, this ended with the death of her fiancé while mine clearing during the North Africa campaign.

== World War II ==
When Britain entered World War II in 1939, Kay Summersby joined the British Mechanised Transport Corps (MTC). She drove an ambulance throughout the London Blitz in 1940 and 1941, and was reportedly excellent at navigating London streets during blackouts and fog. When the United States joined the Allies after the German declaration of war in December 1941, Summersby was one of many MTC drivers assigned as chauffeurs to high-ranking American military officers.

Summersby was assigned to drive Major General Dwight Eisenhower when he arrived in London in May 1942. Though there was a brief interruption of several weeks due to Eisenhower's short return to the US, Summersby chauffeured Eisenhower and later became his secretary until November 1945, based at his home Telegraph Cottage in Warren Road, Coombe, Kingston upon Thames. During this time Eisenhower rose in rank to General of the Army and commander of the European Theatre, and Kay, with his help, became a US citizen and a commissioned officer in the US Women's Army Corps (WACs), ultimately leaving the service as a captain in 1947.

Captain Summersby's military awards included the Bronze Star Medal, Women's Army Corps Service Medal, European Campaign Medal, World War II Victory Medal and the Army of Occupation Medal with "Germany" clasp. While Summersby was recommended for the Legion of Merit by Eisenhower, the nomination was turned down.

== Life after the war ==
Summersby was awarded the British Empire Medal (BEM) in the 1945 New Year Honours List. The award, at the insistence of British Prime Minister Winston Churchill, was presented, with a signed photograph of the Prime Minister, aboard the MV Britannic in New York more than three years later.

After leaving the service in 1947, Summersby settled in the United States, and was, at one point, engaged to a man in San Francisco who thought she had money. She married the Wall Street stockbroker Reginald H. Morgan in 1952, but was divorced in 1958. She died at her home in Southampton, Long Island, of cancer, on 20 January 1975, at the age of 66.

== Relationship with Eisenhower ==
Whether Summersby consummated a romance with Eisenhower during the war is unknown, as there is no definitive evidence as to the matter. Many people knew both of them during the war but none alleged there was an affair. In Eisenhower Was My Boss, Summersby's 1948 memoir of the war years, written with journalist Frank Kearns, she made no mention of any affair. Her 1975 autobiography, Past Forgetting: My Love Affair with Dwight D. Eisenhower, was explicit about there being a romance, although it also said they had not actually had sexual intercourse. However, she did not dictate the text. Past Forgetting was ghostwritten by Barbara Wyden while Summersby was dying of cancer. This book was contracted after Eisenhower had died in 1969. The text states the omission of the affair from the 1948 book was due to her concern for Eisenhower's privacy. Summersby reportedly stated shortly before her death: "The General is dead. I am dying. When I wrote Eisenhower Was My Boss in 1948, I omitted many things, changed some details, glossed over others to disguise as best I could the intimacy that had grown between General Eisenhower and me. It was better that way."

Those who dispute the claim of an affair maintain that the second book's description of the relationship was simply fabricated, presumably by the ghostwriter. By the book's account there were two unsuccessful attempts to have intercourse. Instead of sex, wrote Summersby, the affair mostly consisted of "stolen kisses" during walks or on aeroplanes, holding hands, and horseback riding or golfing together. She kept a note from Eisenhower that asked, "How about lunch, tea, & dinner today?" the note says. "If yes: Who else do you want, if any? At which time? How are you?" Red Cross volunteer and writer Margaret Chase was one of the authors discounting the affair in her 1983 book.

Eisenhower himself only mentioned Summersby once in Crusade in Europe, his 1948 memoir of the war, in a list of aides. Historian Carlo D'Este notes that members of Eisenhower's staff denied that there was ever an affair between them and dismisses Summersby's book as "fanciful". However, rumours and jokes about their relationship were common among soldiers who did not know the two. Eisenhower's son John, who briefly served as an aide, described her as "the Mary Tyler Moore of headquarters. She was perky and she was cute. Whether she had any designs on the Old Man and the extent to which he succumbed, I just don't know."

Field Marshal Bernard Law Montgomery wrote in his diary that Past Forgetting "should have never been written, it can do Eisenhower no good. If American generals were in the habit of dealing with women secretaries and drivers as Eisenhower did and others appear to have done if this book is true, then their characters slump in the eyes of the world. This book makes it clear that Eisenhower discussed with Kay Summersby, his woman car driver, his views on Generals under him, and disclosed to her the most secret matters; all this is now given to the public in her book. Her views on world figures are enlightening, since they are obviously Eisenhower's views."

President Harry S. Truman reportedly told author Merle Miller that in 1945, Eisenhower asked permission from General George Marshall to divorce his wife to marry Summersby, but permission was refused. Truman also allegedly said he had the correspondence between Marshall and Eisenhower retrieved from the Army archives and destroyed. However, Truman's account of the Summersby controversy has been rejected by most scholars. Historians say Truman had a mistaken recollection and emphasize that Eisenhower had asked permission to bring his wife to England. Others have speculated that Truman was not truthful about Eisenhower because of animosity between the two men that intensified during the Eisenhower presidency (Truman stated that Eisenhower did not invite him back to the White House during his administration). Historian Robert H. Ferrell stated he found that the tapes of Miller's interviews with Truman contain no mention whatever of Summersby, and concludes that Miller concocted the story.

Grave of the MacCarthy-Morrogh family at the Church of the Sacred Heart, Rath, a Catholic church in County Cork; after her death, Summersby's ashes were scattered on the family plot.

Eisenhower biographer Jean Edward Smith wrote, "Whether he and Kay were intimate remains a matter of conjecture. But there is no question they were in love." Smith accepted Miller's account because Garrett Mattingly, who as a naval officer in Washington censored outgoing cables, told a similar story to his Columbia University faculty colleagues in the early 1950s. Smith cited several other people who believed in or were told of the existence of an affair. Omar Bradley in his autobiography wrote that the two were in love and that "Their close relationship is quite accurately portrayed, so far as my personal knowledge extends, in Kay's second book, Past Forgetting". James Gavin wrote that when he asked Chicago Tribune reporter John Thompson during the war whether Eisenhower and Summersby were having an affair, Thompson replied "I have never before seen a chauffeur get out of a car and kiss the General good morning".

== Awards and honours ==
- Bronze Star Medal
- Women's Army Corps Service Medal
- European–African–Middle Eastern Campaign Medal with one silver and two bronze campaign stars
- World War II Victory Medal
- Army of Occupation Medal with "GERMANY" clasp
- British Empire Medal (United Kingdom)
- Defence Medal (United Kingdom)
- War Medal 1939–1945 (United Kingdom)
- Six overseas service bars
- Knight in the Order of Orange-Nassau with Swords (Netherlands), Dutch Royal Decree of 25 September 1945, no. 5
