= Defence Medical Welfare Service =

UK charity

The St John and Red Cross Defence Medical Welfare Service, commonly the Defence Medical Welfare Service (DMWS), is a charitable organisation contracted by the UK Ministry of Defence to provide uniformed civilian welfare officers in support of service personnel of the British Armed Forces.

Originally formalised in 1943 as the Service Hospitals Welfare Department under the auspices of the Joint Committee of the Venerable Order of St John and the British Red Cross, it became an independent organisation in 2001.
