= Sadie Bonnell =

English ambulance driver (1888–1993)

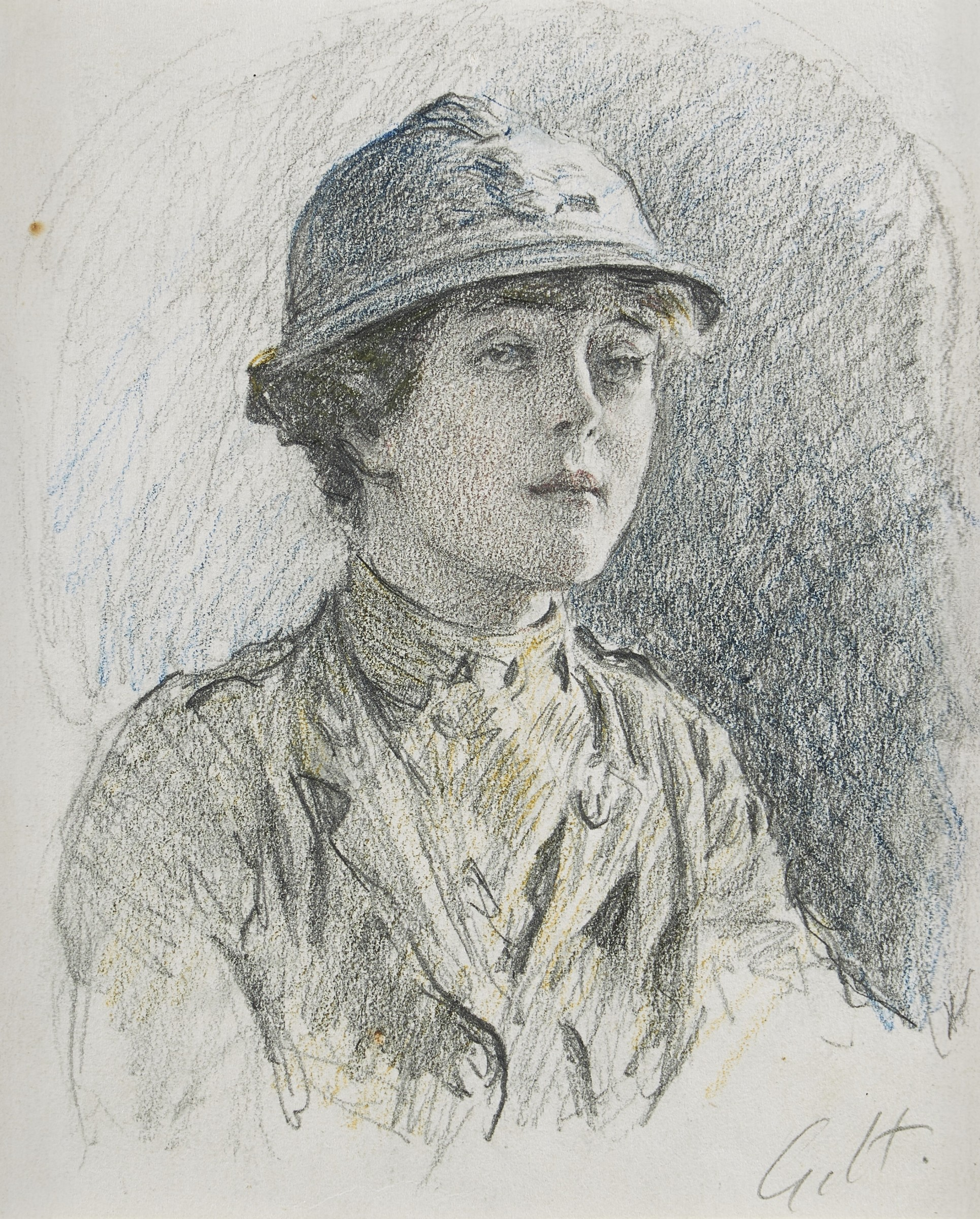
- Born: 4 June 1888; Kew, Surrey
- Died: 2 September 1993 (aged 105)
- Military career
- Allegiance: United Kingdom
- Branch: First Aid Nursing Yeomanry
- Unit: Canadian Army Service Corps
- Conflicts: First World War
- Awards: Military Medal

Sara Talbot MM (née Bonnell, also Marriott; 4 June 1888 – 2 September 1993), also known as Sadie Bonnell, was a British ambulance and supply driver in the First World War. She was awarded the Military Medal for her work in France with the First Aid Nursing Yeomanry. She died at the age of 105.

== Biography ==
Sara "Sadie" Bonnell was born in Kew, Surrey, on 4 June 1888. She was educated at Bedales, a co-educational school. After leaving school she lived at home. During the First World War, she wanted to become an ambulance driver but was not allowed to do so by the authorities since she was a woman. Instead, she drove ambulances in London for the Canadian Army Service Corps. She later joined the First Aid Nursing Yeomanry (FANY) in December 1917, and was sent to Unit 8, a joint FANY/VAD ambulance convoy attached to the British 2nd Army, based at St Omer. The FANYs had been founded in 1907 as an all-women mounted volunteer corps. By the outbreak of war in 1914, they had shifted into motorised ambulance work, also working for the Belgian and French Armies. Bonnell showed great courage during the East End Air Raid. She was driving an ambulance in 1916 during some of the first air raids London experienced.

Bonnell earned the Military Medal on the night of 18–19 May 1918 when she was based in a large camp on the road to Arques in France. She collected wounded men near from a dressing station near Saint-Omer whilst under heavy German bombardment for five hours. The enemy's shells had set a nearby ammunition dump on fire. She returned again and again with Evelyn Brown, a volunteer Canadian, succeeding in removing all the wounded. She was decorated by the commander of British Second Army, General Sir Herbert Plumer, 1st Viscount Plumer.

After the war, Bonnell returned to England in 1919 and worked in hospitals as a volunteer. She loved fast cars and between the wars drove a six-cylinder AC with a red fish mascot on the bonnet which echoed the FANY logo.

== Personal life and death ==
Bonnell married Herbert Marriott on 1 September 1919. They had met in France where he was with the 2nd Army, where he was involved in a poison gas attack. She said he proposed to her whilst they were under enemy fire in France. He died in 1921 during the influenza pandemic. She later married again in 1948, to Charles Leslie Talbot, who died in 1967. She had no children herself and was devoted to her nieces and nephew. She spent the Second World War in Sussex and knew A. A. Milne and his son, Christopher Robin.

In the 1920s, Bonnell designed and built a house called "Thrushling" in Upper Hartfield, Sussex. After she sold it, she revisited it and reviled the owners for covering her beautiful parquet floor with a carpet. She spent her final years at Dorset House, Droitwich.

At 95, she regretted that she could no longer drive fast cars. She received a telegram from the Queen on her hundredth birthday on 4 June 1988. She died at the age of 105 on 2 September 1993 and her funeral was attended by members of FANY. Her obituary appeared in the Daily Telegraph, The Independent and The Times.

== Sources ==
- Sadie Bonnell personal papers, First Aid Nursing Yeomanry (FANY) Archives, London SW1
