= Lilian Franklin =

British commanding officer of the First Aid Nursing Yeomanry

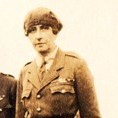
- Born: Lilian Annie Margueretta Franklin; 1882
- Died: 8 January 1955 (aged 72–73); Horsham, West Sussex, England
- Known for: Commandant of the First Aid Nursing Yeomanry
- Successor: Mary Baxter Ellis

Lilian Annie Margueretta Franklin OBE (1882 – 8 January 1955), known as "Boss", was the British commanding officer of the First Aid Nursing Yeomanry (FANY) until 1932. She took the organisation of six volunteers to organise hospitals and nursing stations in France and Belgium in the First World War. In 1916 the British Army agreed that it too could use the FANY's support and Franklin was the first driver and in command. She left the FANY in 1932.

== Life ==
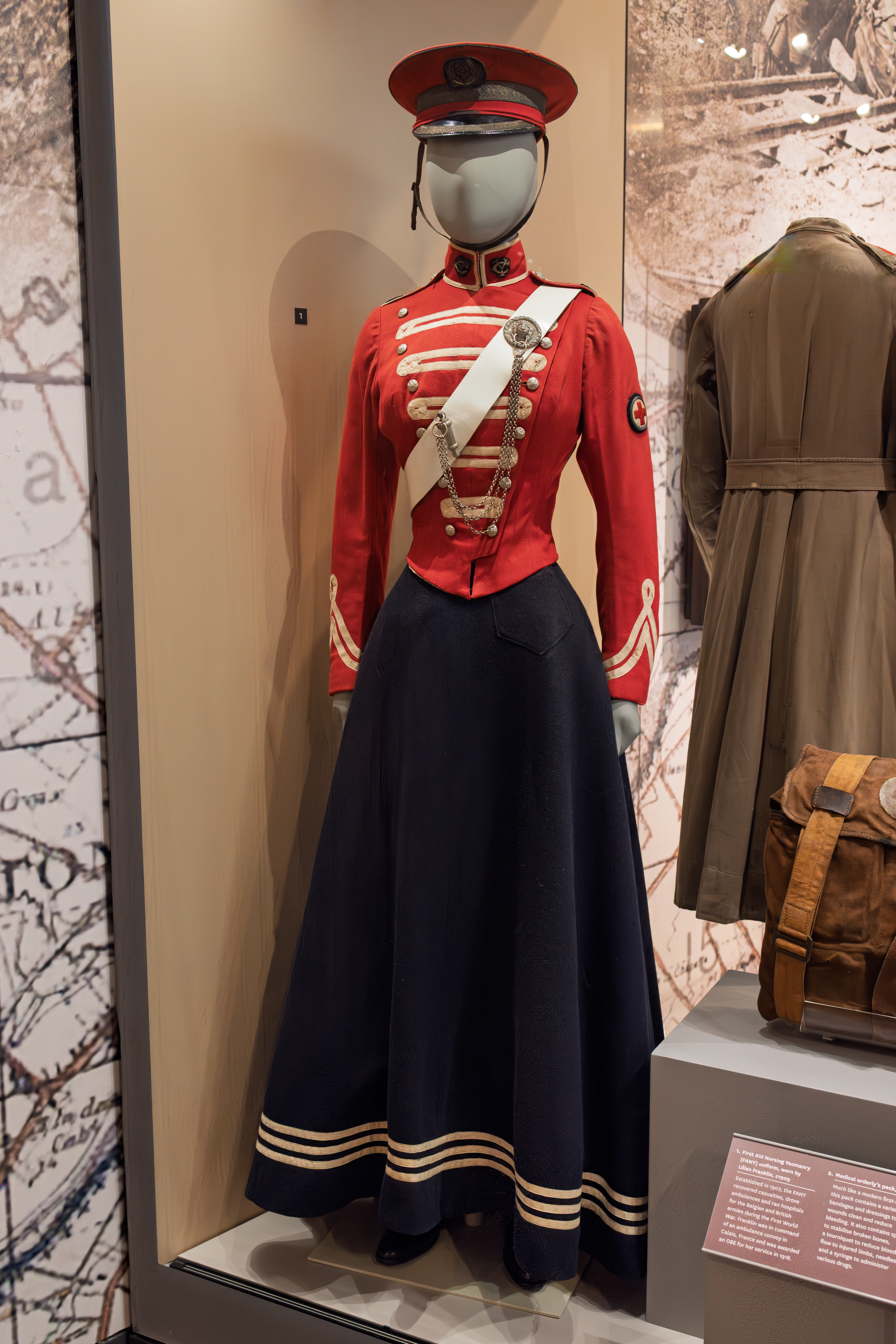
Franklin's FANY uniform (c. 1909), on display in the National Army Museum

Franklin's birth day is not known but she lived for a time at Hook, Surrey. Her parents were William and Louisa and she had a brother.

The FANY was formed to both rescue the wounded and to administer first aid from horseback. Their founder felt that a single rider could get to a wounded soldier faster than a horse-drawn ambulance. Each woman was trained not only in first aid but signalling and drilling in cavalry movements. The organisation was troubled and Mabel St Clair Stobart formed the rival Women's Sick and Wounded Convoy Corps in 1910. Only six women remained in the FANY and Lilian Franklin was one of them.

At the start of 1912, she was a second lieutenant, and she and Sergeant-Major Ashley-Smith won a power struggle with the FANY founder Edward Baker and his daughter, Katie. Franklin helped introduce a more practical uniform and in 1912 the FANY uniform became a khaki tunic, khaki riding skirt, and later, a khaki soft cap. Franklin and Ashley-Smith were in charge. Before the First World War started in 1914, Franklin and Ashley-Smith are credited with reinventing the FANY after the disagreement with the founders had been settled.

== First World War ==
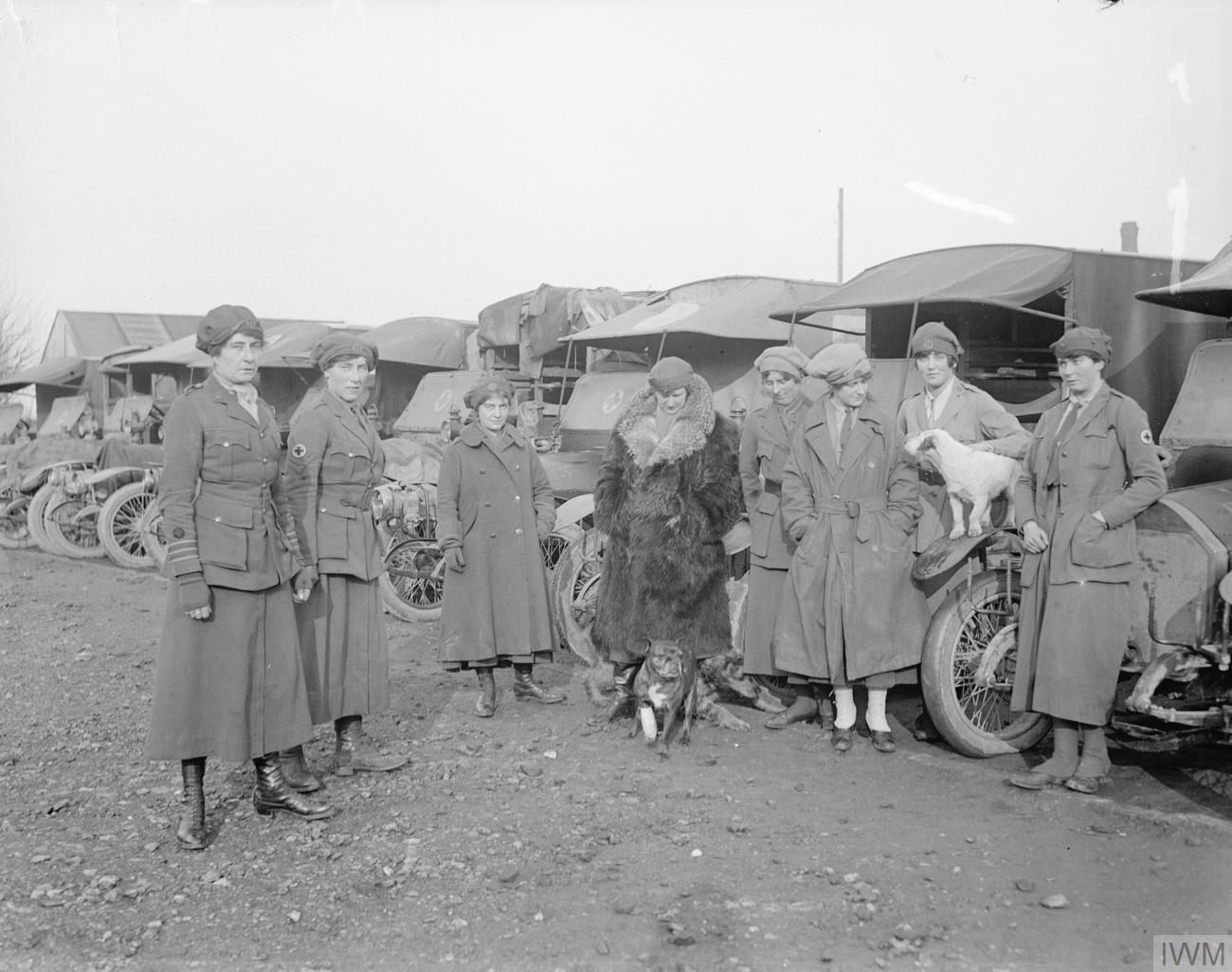
Franklin with the FANY in Calais in 1917

In 1914, the FANY offered their service to the British War Office, but they were ignored despite a recommendation from the surgeon-general. Instead, they offered their service to the Belgians and the French, who accepted. The FANYs proceeded to run casualty stations and hospitals for them.

In 1916, the British War Office asked the FANY to work with them. On New Year's Day, Franklin was in command and she was the first woman driver for the British army as a convoy was formed at Calais.

== After the war ==
Mary Baxter Ellis was leading the Northumberland section in 1928 and she took over from Franklin in 1932.

Franklin died in Horsham.

== Honours ==
In 1917 Franklin was mentioned in dispatches. She was awarded the MBE in 1918 and the OBE in 1933.

== Bibliography ==
- Lee, Janet (2012). War Girls: the First Aid Nursing Yeomanry in the First World War. Manchester University Press. ISBN 978-0-71906-712-9.
