= List of SOE agents =

The following is an incomplete list of agents who served in the field for the Special Operations Executive during World War II.

== A ==
Name	SOE Section	Nationality	Born–Died	Awards	Notes
Alf Aakre	Norway	Norwegian	1917-1988		Member of the "Aakre Gang." Participated in Operation Carhampton
Arthur Reade	Crete	British	1902-1971	DSO, MC	SOE's Head of Administration & operative sent to sink the HMS York
Elizabeth Lorraine Adie (Lorraine Copeland)	Middle East	British	1916–2013		Married American OSS agent Miles Copeland, Jr.
Francine Agazarian	F, Physician, Prosper	British	1913–1998	FGS, MiD, WM, ST	Courier. Landed in France by aircraft in March 1943. Wife of Jack Agazarian, a Wireless Operator with Prosper circuit.
Jack Agazarian	France	British	1916–1945		Killed in concentration camp March 1945. Armenian father and French mother, brother of the RAF fighter ace Noel Agazarian
Juliane Aisner	F, Farrier	French	1919–1947		
Roland Alexandre	France		1921–1944		
Elisee Allard			1916–1944		
Rehavam Amir			1916–2013		[this is SIS/ISLD, not SOE]
Phillip Amphlett			1921–1945		
James Amps			1908–1945		Previously a jockey. Had a French wife, after easing out of circuit was implicated in documents found in 1943 when other agents arrested.
France Antelme	France	Mauritian	1900–1945		Captured when landed in France and killed at Gross-Rosen concentration camp
Claude Arnault					
Benjamin Aptaker	France	English	21.8.1923–2.9.2012	FGS, MiD, WM, ST CdeG, DM	Section Captain flown into France night parachute in 6.3.1944, posted to Dachau 1945, Judge Advocate General's Branch 1945-46 (Germany) (A/Major), Codename Aleric, Gardener Circuit (w/t operator) Name changed to Roger Forster after his first marriage. Family Originally from Ukraine Immigrants in the early 1900's to UK

== B ==
Name	SOE Section	Nationality	Born-Died	Awards	Notes
Dorothy Baden-Powell	Scandinavian	British	1920–unk		WRNS
Claude de Baissac	France	Mautritian	1907–1974		Brother of Lisé de Baissac and husband of Mary Katherine Herbert
Lisé de Baissac	France	Mauritian	1905–2004	LdH, CdeG	Sister of SOE Agent Claude de Baissac, Portrayed as Louise Desfontaines in the movie Female Agents (Les Femmes de l'ombre).
Giliana Balmaceda					The first female SOE agent to be sent to occupied France (sent in May 1941). Instrumental in gathering intelligence and important documents such as rations cards for implementing safe houses, routes, and sustenance for field agents. Married Victor Gerson after the war.
Madeleine Barclay (Madeleine Victorine Bayard)	France	French	1911–1943		WRNS, Killed when HMS Fidelity was sunk by U-boat
John Barrett			1916–1944		arrested in 1944, shot at Buchenwald 5 October 1944
Eric Barrett	Force 136 GHi(k)	British	1910–1975		
Yvonne Jeanne de Vibraye Baseden	F, Scholar	British	1922–2017	CdeG, FGS, LdH, MBE, MR, ST, WM	At age 18, joined WAAF. Wireless Operator. Codename : Odette. Parachuted into SW France near the village of Gabarret in March 1944. Later known as Yvonne Burney. Taken to Ravensbrück concentration camp, survived, taken in by the Swedish Red Cross, then released home by Vera Atkins.
Charles Noel Beattie	British	Britain	1939–1946	MiD	
Alcide Beauregard	France	Canadian	1917–1944	MiD	Captured by Germans. Killed in Saint-Genis-Laval massacre 20 August 1944
Francis Eugène Bec	Section F, Headmaster	British	1905–1944		Killed in action when Germans carried out attack on maquis of Charnie 16 June 1944
Stanley Beckinsale	Crete	British	1920–2004	MC	
Yolande Beekman	F, Musician	Swiss	1911–1944	CdeG, MiD	Wireless Operator, member of Women's Auxiliary Air Force, flown into France in September 1943, Codename : Mariette, Kilt. Killed at Dachau concentration camp with Madeleine Damerment, Noor Inayat Khan, and Eliane Plewman
Georges Bégué	France	French	1911–1993		Wireless operator; first SOE agent infiltrated into France.
Herbert John Bell	Albania/Italy	British	1919–2001	MM	
John S. Bennett	Yugoslavia	British	1911–1970	CBE, CVO	Led SOE's Yugoslav section after joining Section D.
Robert Benoist	F, Clergyman	French	1895–1944		arrested June 1944. Executed at Buchenwald concentration camp on 14 September 1944
Kem Bennett			1919–1986		
Louis Bertheau	France	French	1919–1945	MiD	KIA
Gustave "Guy" Biéler	France	Canadian	1904–1944	DSO MBE	
Emanuel Bierer			1884–unk		
Helen Bierer			1885–unk		Full Name: Helen Anna Agate Thormann-Bierer
Andre Bloch			1914–1942		KIA
Denise Madeleine Bloch	F, Clergyman, Detective		1916–1945	KCBC, LdH, CdeG	Killed at Ravensbrück concentration camp with Lilian Rolfe and Violette Szabo
Marcus Bloom	France	British	1907–1944	MiD	Killed at Mauthausen concentration camp
Bridget Blundell			unk–1999	MBE	
Nicholas Bodington	France	British	1904–1974	MBE	
Nestor Bodson	England	Belgian	1921-1942		shot by firing squad 5 December 1942 in Bruxelles-Schaerbeek
Andrée Borrel	F, Physician	French	1919–1944	CdeG, MR, KCBC	Courier. Codenames : Monique, Denise Urbain. KIA at Natzweiler-Struthof concentration camp
Jean Bouguennec	France		1912–1944		KIA
Edwin Boxshall	Yugoslavia	British	1897–1984	MBE	Longest-serving British intelligence officer, custodian of SOE archives (1959–1982)
Tony Brooks	France	British	1922–2007	DSO, MC, CdeG, LdH	
Captain Basil Brown			1918–1970	MBE	
Albert Browne-Bartroli	France	French	1915-1967	DSO, CdeG	
Carl Johan Bruhn	Denmark	Danish	1904-1941		Died during the first attempt at drop-off with a parachute in Denmark by SOE agents.
Joséf Bublik					
Maurice Buckmaster	France	British	1902–1992	MBE, CdeG	F Section Chief
Christopher Burney	France	British	1917–1980	MBE	
Norman Burley					Real Name: Noel Fernand Rauol Burdeyron
Sonya Butt	F, Headmaster	British	1924–2014	MBE, MiD	Courier. Married fellow SOE agent Guy D'Artois
Muriel Byck	France	British	1918–1944	MiD	Died in service of meningitis at Romorantin Hospital
Robert Bennett Byerly			1916–1944		

== C ==
Name	SOE Section	Nationality	Born-Died	Awards	Notes
Eric Cauchi	F, Stockbroker	Greek	1917–1944	MiD, CdeG, M.R.F.	
Francis Cammaerts	F, Donkeyman, Jockey	British	1916–2006	DSO, LdH, CdeG	
Maddalena Cerasuolo	No.1 SF	Italian	1920–1999	Bronze Medal of Military Valor (Italy)	Code name: Maria Esposito, C22; sabotage missions, resistant
William John Chalk			1899–unk		
Robert Arthur Chapman			1901–unk		
Valentine Blanche Charlet	F, Detective	British	1898–1985	MBE	Courier. Served with Women's Transport Service.
Pierre Chassé		Canadian	1923–1988	Member of the Order of the British Empire (MBE) Distinguished Service Order (DSO) Croix de Guerre avec palmes 1939-45 (France)	
Marie-Thérèse Le Chêne	France	French	1890-unk	MBE, CdeG	
Arthur Christie		British	1921–2003		
Kjeld Toft-Christensen	Denmark	Danish	1910–1945	MC,	Committed suicide on 27 November 1945.
Oliver Churchill	Italy	British	1914–1997	DSO, MC, Italian Partisan Medal	Brother of Group Captain Walter Churchill and Captain Peter Churchill
Peter Churchill	France	British	1909–1972	DSO, CdeG	Brother of Group Captain Walter Churchill and Major Oliver Churchill
Marcel Clech			1905–1944		wireless operator. arrested and executed at Mauthausen concentration camp.
George Clement			1917–1944		
Jean Coleman	F, Acolyte	British	1908–1982		
Adolphus Richard Cooper			1899–unk		
Ted Coppin			1915–1943		
Yvonne Cormeau	F, Wheelwright	British	1909–1997	CdeG, DM, GS, MBE, LdH, War Medal 1939-1945, ST	Joined Women's Auxiliary Air Force. Courier and Wireless Operator. The 2nd female Wireless Operator to be sent to France. Parachuted into St Antoine du Queyret in SW France in August 1943. Evaded arrest by convincing the enemy that her radio was an X-Ray Machine. Codenames : Annette, Fairy, Sarafari.
Henri Cornioley	France	British	1914–2008		Husband of Pearl Witherington
Noël Coward		British	1899–1972		
Benjamin Cowburn	France	British	1909–1994	MC and Bar, LdH, CdeG	Four successful missions into France
Jørgen Robert Christensen	Denmark	Danish	1921–2004		Frogman, co-founder of the Danish Frogman Corps and second in command from 1957 to 1970
Andrew Croft	Norway	British	1906–1998	DSO, MBE	
Mike Cumberlege	Force 133	British	1905–1945	DSO and Bar, RD	after capture and torture by the Germans

== D ==
Name	SOE Section	Nationality	Born-Died	Awards	Notes
Madeleine Damerment	F - Bricklayer	French	1917–1944		at Dachau concentration camp with Yolande Beekman, Noor Inayat Khan, and Eliane Plewman
Guy D'Artois	France	Canadian	1917–1999	DSO, GM, CdeG	Married fellow SOE agent Sonya Butt
Jimmy Davies		British	1913–1940	DFC, MiD	KIA
Marcel Defence			1920–1944		
Ange Defendini			1909–1944		
George Demand		British	1921–1944		George_Demand
Delmeire Alphonse	France	Belgian	1919–1944		KIA 7 June 1944 in Germany
Francois Adolphe Deniset			1917–1944		
Henri Dericourt	France	French	1909–1962		Possibly a double agent
Freddi Desmet	France	Dutch	1912–1946		Real Name: Christiaan Lindemans
Julien Detal			unk–1944		
Elizabeth Devereux-Rochester	F, Marksman	British	1917 – 1983?	LdH, CdeG	Courier. Born to American parents. Codename : Typist, FANY
Henri Diacono	F, Spiritualist				Wireless Operator.
Douglas Dodds-Parker	Abyssinia	British	1909–2006	LdH, CdeG, MiD	field service, then senior staff officer
Derek Dodson					
Leo Donati	Italy	Italian	1919–1972		
Hugh Dormer	France	British	1919–1944	DSO	Left SOE in January 1944 (KIA serving with Irish Guards in August 1944).
Roland Dowlen			1907–1945		
Joan Lois Dowson	France	British	1924 - 2010	G.M., CdeG, C.B.E. late of Girton College, Cambridge	
André Dubois			1906–1944		
Emile Duboudin			1907–1945		
Gustave Duclos	France	French	1916–2002	MC, CdeG, LdH, EM, MR, Corps Expéditionnaire Français d’Extrême Orient, Croix du Combattant, Croix de Guerre Théâtres d’Opération Extérieurs	
Phillip Duclos			1923–1944		
Alix D'Unienville	France	Mauritian	1919–unk		
Archie Dunlop-Mackenzie	Baltic	British			
Gavan Bernard Duffy		British	1916–1990	MC	
Lucien Dumais	France	Canadian		MC, CdeG, LdH	In charge of Shelburn Line (Shelbourne Line) Operation Bonaparte
Pieter Dourlein		Dutch			Escaped back to England and survived war.

== E ==
Name	SOE Section	Nationality	Born-Died	Awards	Notes
Alf Espedal	Norwegian Independent Company 1	Norwegian	1914–1969		Trained in STS 26 at Glen More and other Special Training Schools. In charge of "Operation Osprey" that parachuted in Rogaland county on Dec. 10 1943.
Reginald Harold Everson			1923–1990		
Francois Michelle William Reeve					

== F ==
Name	SOE Section	Nationality	Born-Died	Awards	Notes
Albert George Falla	France	Guernsey	1915–1996	Italy, Africa & 39-45 Stars	Worked for MI6 after War until Retirement
Eugene Felangue			1912–1945		
Patrick Leigh Fermor	Crete	British	1915–2011	DSO, MBE	
David Finlayson			1923–1944		
Yvonne Fontaine	F, Tinker, Minister	French	1913–1996	MdlRF	
Marcel Fox	F, Spruce, Publican	French	1910–1945	CdeG, LdH, MiD, MR	Reg # : 257605. Codename : Georges, Ernest. Deported to and KIA in Flossenbürg
Henri Frager	France	French	1897–1944	MiD, MdlRF	KIA
Louis Francou		Belgian			also known as Bullfrog

== G ==
Name	SOE Section	Nationality	Born-Died	Awards	Notes
Henri Gaillot	France	Belgian	1896–1944		KIA (also known as "Ignace" or "Guillaume")
Albrecht Gaiswinkler	France	Austrian	1905–1979		
Harry Gamwell	Yugoslavia & Italy	British	1912–1998		Syracuse, Bari, Alexandria, Yugoslavia.
Emile Garry			1909–1944		KIA
P A H Geelen			1916–1944		KIA
Ole Geisler	Denmark	Danish	1913–1948	DSO	From 1943 head of SOE's work in Jutland.
Victor Gerson	France	British	1896–?	DSO, LdH	Organised the Vic escape line in France into neutral Spain. Married Giliana Balmaceda after the war
Alfredo Mechoulam Gerassi	Portugal/Spain/France	France	1902-1995	King's Medal for Courage in the Cause of Freedom	
François de Langlade	French	Malaya, China, French Indochina	1904–1991		
Paul Goffin		Belgian	1915–1967		also known as Gofer
John G. Goldsmith	France	British	1909–1972	DSO, MC, CdeG, LdH	See "Accidental Agent" memoir published 1971.
Malby E. G. Goodman	British	Cairo, Yugoslavia, Italy	1917–2015		
Harry Graham			1910–1945		KIA
André Grandclément	France	French	1908–1944		Executed as a double agent
Christine Granville (Krystyna Skarbek)	F, Jockey	Polish	1908 - 1952	OBE, GM, Croix de Guerre	Courier. Operated under the name "Madame Pauline" in France. One of the longest serving of Britain's wartime women agents. Parachuted into SE France in July 1944. One of the few SOE female field agents promoted to captain. Killed in 1952 by man who had become obsessed with her.
Sverre Granlund	Nor.IC.1	Norwegian	1918–1943	DCM, WCS	
William Grover-Williams	F, Chestnut	British	1903–1945		Captured and executed at Sachsenhausen
Jacques Vaillant de Guélis	France	British	1997-1945	MBE, Military Cross, Croix de Guerre	Died from an automobile accident on 7 August 1945
Armel Guerne			1911–1980		
René Dumont-Guillemet	F, Spiritualist				Organizer of Spiritualist circuit.

== H ==
Name	SOE Section	Nationality	Born-Died	Awards	Notes
Virginia Hall	F, Heckler	American	1906–1982	MBE, DSC	Post war worked for the CIA
Odette Hallowes	F, Spindle	British	1912–1995	GC, MBE, LdH	Most highly decorated woman in WWII. Also known by the surnames "Sansom" and "Churchill" (By marriage). Codename 'Lise'. Married Peter Churchill after the war.
John Hamilton			1907–1944		
Mogens Hammer	Denmark	Danish	1911-1946		Sent together with Carl Johan Bruhn over Denmark
Gordon Harris	Italy / Greece	British	1917-1965		P.A. to Gen. Stawell. Attached to Col Papas Tamitiades, Greek commander in Peloponnese for direct liaison with 3 corps.
John Beresford "Jack" Hayes		British	1904–unk		Organised Mission Helmsman in July–August 44
Victor Hayes			1908–1944		
Mary Hemmings			1914–unk		
Mary Katherine Herbert	France	Irish	1903–1983		First WAAF Officer to join the SOE
Richard Henry Heslop	France	British	1907–1973	DSO, LdH, CdeG	Organiser (leader) of Marksman network.
Richard Hewitt		British	1917–1994	MBE	commanded the Allied No 1 Special Forces in the Italian Campaign
Harry Hill		British			
George Hiller	France	British	1916–1972		
Wilhelm Holst	DF, France	Norwegian	1895–1949	Croix de Guerre avec palme, Legion d'honneur, 1st Knight of The Royal Norwegian Order of St. Olav, Medaille de la Resistance	Head of Billet circuit, Head of Eduard escape line to Spain
Marcel Homet			1897–unk		
Desmond Ellis Hubble		British	1910–1944	Le Croix de Chevalier de l'Ordre Royal du Lion, avec Palme, Croix de Guerre, avec Palme. Medal of French Gratitude. Mentioned in despatches.	Executed at Buchenwald, Germany
Bill Hudson	Yugoslavia	British	1910-1995	DSO OBE	According to The Sunday Times, Ian Fleming used Hudson as a model for his character, James Bond. Prior to the SOE, he was in Section D of the British Secret Intelligence Service (SIS).
Christopher Sydney "Soapy" Hudson	France, Headmaster; Force 136	British	1910-2005	Croix de Guerre and DSO with bar	Two missions to France and a mission to Southeast Asia with Force 136
Harry Hudson		British	1924-2012		
André Hue	France	Anglo-French	1923–2005	DSO	
Max Hymans	France	France	1900–1961		

== I ==
Name	SOE Section	Nationality	Born-Died	Awards	Notes
Captain Basil Irwin	Yugoslavia and Italy			MC	Liaison Officer
Jerzy Iwanow-Szajnowicz	Greece	Polish-Greek	1911-1943	Virtuti Militari, Cross of Valour	also known as Nikolaos Tsenoglou. Code name, O33B. Independent. Saboteur in occupied Greece in cooperation with the Greek Resistance

== J ==
Name	SOE Section	Nationality	Born-Died	Awards	Notes
Ingolf Johannesen		Norwegian	1915–1998		Member of the Shetland gang. Crew on board the KNM ''Hitra''
Peter Johnsen					
Sydney Jones			1902–1944		
Ginette Jullian	France	French	1917–1962		
Clement Jumeau			1914–1944		
Douglas Jung	Force 136	Canadian	1924–2002		Later become the first Chinese-Canadian MP

== K ==
Name	SOE Section	Nationality	Born-Died	Awards	Notes
Noor Inyat Khan	France	Indian/American	1914–1944	GC, CdeG, MiD	Killed at Dachau concentration camp alongside Yolande Beekman, Madeleine Damerment and Eliane Plewman
Andrzej Kowerski		Polish	1912–1988		also known as Andrew Kennedy
Mary Knowles			1917–2003		also known as Christine
Marguerite Knight	France	British	1920–2004	MBE	Codename 'Nicole'
Peter Kemp	Cairo (Balkans), Force 136	British	1913–1993		Author of books Mine Were of Trouble (1957), No Colours or Crest (1958), Alms for Oblivion (1962), The Thorns of Memory (1990)

== L ==
Name	SOE Section	Nationality	Born-Died	Awards	Notes
Paul Emile Labelle	France	Canadian	1916–28/02/2003	MC	Codename Nartex
Raymond LaBrosse	France	Canadian	1920–1986	MC, CdeG, LdH	Radio Operator - Shelburn Line (Shelbourne Line) Operation Bonaparte
Max Lafaye	France	French	1912–1986	French Resistance Medal	Deported to KL Buchenwald (Jan 1944–Jan 45)- Dora (Jan 45–Apr 1945) - Bergen-Belsen (15 Apr. 1945)
Peter Lake	France				
A R Landsdell					
Maurice Larcher		Mauritian	1922-1944	CdeG, LdH, MiD	Registration # : 306766. Codename : Vladimir, Linesman, Sari. Parachuted into France in February 1944. His brother, George Larcher, was also an SOE agent. KIA in July 1944 in Pierrefitte-en-Cinglais, France. Body recovered October 1944.
James Larose					
Leif Larsen	Shetland Bus	Norwegian	1906–1990	DSO, DSC, CGM, DSM and Bar, 2 x Norwegian War Cross with one sword, St. Olav's Medal With Oak Branch, War Medal with three stars, Defence Medal 1940–1945, Medal of Freedom etc.	The most highly decorated naval officer of World War II
Phyllis Latour	France	British (South African-born)	1921–2023	MBE, CdeG	
Huub Lauwers		Dutch	1915–2004		Was captured by the Germans and held at numerous Nazi concentration camps but he survived the war.
Madeleine Lavigne	F, Silversmith	French	1912–1945		FANY, SPRUCE. Courier. Wireless Operator. Codename : Isabelle. Alias : Madeleine Latour .
Marcel Leccia	F, Labourer		1911-1944	MR	Registration # : 309883. Codename : Baudouin. Alias : Georges Louis.
Jacques Paul Henri Ledoux					
Lionel Lee			1944	MC, Cr de Guerre	British Jewish agent. Betrayed, murdered at Gross Rosen.
Mike Lees	Yugoslavia, Italy	British	1922-1993		Successfully planned and executed Operation Tombola
Cecily Lefort	F, Jockey	British	1900–1945	CdeG, MiD	courier, Served in WAAF Aircraft Woman #452845, parachuted into the Loire Valley with SOE agents Diana Rowden and Noor Inayat Khan, Killed at Ravensbrück concentration camp
Vera Leigh	France	British	1903–1944	King's Commendation for Brave Conduct	Killed at Natzweiler-Struthof concentration camp
M A Lepage					
E Lesout					
Joël Letac	France	French	1918–2005	Ordre national de la Légion d'honneur, Compagnon de la Libération, CdG, Médaille de la Résistance	Detained in Dora and Bergen-Belsen
Philippe Liewer	France	French	1911–1950	MC, CdeG	
Ole Lippmann	Denmark	Danish	1916–2002		Replaced Flemming Muus as SOE parachute commander
Christopher Lord	T	British	unk–1943		Killed on duty in June 1943 to Tanus (Tarn) in France.
Desmond Longe	Britain	French			Codenamed, Refraction. Rank, Major.

== M ==
Name	SOE Section	Nationality	Born-Died	Awards	Notes
Elaine Madden	T	British	1923–2012		
Amédée Maingard	France	Mauritian	1918–1981	DSO, CdeG	
Stanislaw Makowski	France				
Max Manus	Norwegian Independent Company 1	Norwegian	1914–1996	DSO, MC & Bar, War Cross with two swords, Defence Medal 1940–1945 (with rosette), Medal of Freedom with silver palm etc.	
Claude Raymond Malraux	F, Salesman	French	1920-1944		Registration # : 316119. Codename : Cicero. KIA at Gross-Rosen concentration camp
Andre Adrian Jules Maugenet					
Comte Jacques-Arthus Marc de Montalembert					
Ernest Miller					
Gavin Maxwell	Instructor	British	1914–1969		
James Andrew Mayer		Mauritian			
James Francis George Mennesson					
Francois Gerard Michel					
George Millar	F	British	1910–2005	DSO MC	
G B McBain					
John Kenneth Macalister	F	Canadian	1914–1944		KIA
S Makowski					
R M A Mathieu					
Jan Molenaar	N	Dutch	1918–1942		
W. Stanley Moss	F133, F136	British	1921–1965	MC	
Pierre Louis Mulsant					
Flemming Muus	Denmark	Danish	1907–1982	DSO	SOE parachute commander from 1943 to 1945
Buntie Aurelle Neredah Macklin-Sprake	UK	British	1919–2010		Married Arie Van Duyn. Dutch SOE Radio Operator

== N ==
Name	SOE Section	Nationality	Born-Died	Awards	Notes
Eileen Mary "Didi" Nearne	F, Wizard	British	1921–2010	CdeG, MBE	Sister of SOE agents Jacqueline & Francis Nearne. Codename : Rose. Wireless Operator.
Francis Nearne	France	British			Brother of SOE agents Eileen & Jacqueline Nearne
Jacqueline Nearne	France	British	1916–1982	MBE	Sister of SOE agents Eileen & Francis Nearne. Codename : Josette.
Isidore Newman	F, Salesman	British	c.1916–1944	MBE	Captured, and shot at Mauthausen on 6 September 1944 with 45 other agents.
Alfred Newton					
Henry Newton					
Gilbert Norman	France	British	1914–1944		KIA

== O ==
Name	SOE Section	Nationality	Born-Died	Awards	Notes
Sonia Olschanezky	F, Juggler/Robin	French	1923-1944		Member of SOE's Juggler/Robin Circuit, Juggler sub-circuit of Physician/Prosper circuit. Captured in 1944, Interrogated by the Gestapo. Executed at Natzweiler-Struthof Concentration Camp.
Maureen Patricia "Paddy" O'Sullivan	F, Fireman	Irish	1918 - 1994		Member of WAAF. SOE wireless operator. Parachuted into France near Limoges in April 1944.

== P ==
Name	SOE Section	Nationality	Born-died	Awards	Notes
Paul Pardi	France	French	1920-1944	Resistance Medal	His mother was captured and tortured, but never revealed what she knew. She received the Croix de Guerre.
George Wyndham Parker	Norwegian Independent Company 1	British	1913–1992	MM, MiD, Norwegian War Cross with two swords	Mission planner
Alv Kristian Pedersen	Norwegian Independent Company 1	Norwegian	1908–1982	MBE + various Norwegian.	
Maurice Pertschuk	France	French	1921–1945	MBE, Croix de Guerre, Legion of Honor	Killed at Buchenwald on 29 March 1945.
Peter Pertschuk	France	French	1923–1995		Brother of Maurice Pertschuk. He was not used operationally.
Harry Peulevé	France	British	1916–1963	DSO, MC	
Frank Pickersgill	France	Canadian	1915–1944		KIA
Richard Francis Pinder	France	British	1913–1981	Croix de Guerre	FOOTMAN Circuit - survived deportation.
Eliane Plewman	F, Monk, Monkeypuzzle	British	1917–1944	KCBC, CdeG	courier, Codename : 'Gaby', 'Dean', 'Madame Dupont'/ Agent Monk, parachuted into France on the night of 13/14 August 1943, arrested and tortured by Gestapo in March 1944, transferred to Dachau with Yolande Beekman and Madeleine Damerment, killed at Dachau concentration camp.
Jacques Poirier	F, Author Digger	French	1922-2006	Distinguished Service Order (DSO)	

== Q ==
Name	SOE Section	Nationality	Born-Died	Awards	Notes
Anthony Quayle	Albania	British	1913–1989		liaison officer with the partisans in Albania

== R ==
Name	SOE Section	Nationality	Born-Died	Awards	Notes
Adolphe Rabinovitch			1918–1944		Captured and executed at Gross-Rosen concentration camp in 1944 according to Maurice Buckmaster speaking in person in the opening scene of 1950 film Odette.
Herbert Maurice Roe	Force 136 1945 SSRF 1942 2 Commando	British	1917–2014	MM & MiD	
Josette Renee Paule Ronserail	SOE - courier and wireless operator	French	1919-1990	Croix de Guerre, the Médaille de la Résistance, and the Legion of Honour	She was arrested by the Gestapo in 1944 and tortured, but she did not reveal any information. She was deported to Ravensbrück concentration camp, where she survived until the liberation in 1945
Alex Rabinovich					
Brian Dominic Rafferty					
Denis Rake	France	British	1901–1976	MC	
Charles Rechenmann					
Harry Alfred Rée	F, Stockbroker	British	1914–1991	DSO, MBE	Organizer for Stockbroker circuit. Codename : César.
Haviva Reik	Slovakia	Slovak	1914–1944		KIA
Jean Renaut		Belgian			
Jean Renaud-Dandicolle	France	French	1923-1944	MC, LdH, CdeG	Shot and captured by the Germans at a farmhouse on the Saint-Clair plateau used to store a radio transmitter and weapons. Likely executed. His body was never found.
Anne Robertson			1920–unk		
Lilian Rolfe	F, Historian	British	1914–1945	MBE, CdeG, MiD	Wireless Operator, KIA at Ravensbrück concentration camp with Violette Szabo and Denise Bloch
Jasper Rootham	Yugoslavia	British	1910–1990		
Diana Rowden	F, Acrobat	British	1915–1944	MBE, CdeG, MiD	KIA at Natzweiler-Struthof concentration camp
Yvonne Rudelatt	F, Adolph	French	1897–1945	CdeG	courier, Died in service of typhus at Bergen-Belsen concentration camp
Christian Michael Rottbøll	Denmark	Danish	1917-1942		KIA

== S ==
Name	SOE Section	Nationality	Born-Died	Awards	Notes
Roméo Sabourin	France	Canadian	1923–1944		Captured and killed 1944
Anthony P B St.John	Burma	British	1925–1990		
Paul F M Sarrette					
Alexandre Schwatschko					
Enzo Sereni	Italy	Italian	1905–1944		captured and executed in Dachau concentration camp.
Henri Sevenet	France	French	1914-1944	Legion d'Honneur, Croix de Guerre	killed in German bombing raid
John B. Selby	Yugoslavia	British	1915–1991	DSO, DFC, Partisan Star	
Jack Andrew Eugene Marcel Sinclair					
Jean Alexandre Robert Simon					
Octave Anne Guillaume Simon					
Krystyna Skarbek	France	Polish	1915–1952	GM, MBE, CdeG	Better known by her pseudonym Christine Granville
Brian Skelly			1920–2001		
Charles Skepper	France	British	1905–c.1944		
Einar Skinnarland	Norway	Norwegian	1918–2002	DCM	
Giovanni Slaviero	Italy	Italian	1914-1999	Bronze Medal of Military Valor	CLNAI partisan from 1943, recruited into SOE and SIM February 1945 as head of the Modena area. Participated in Operation SILENTIA and GRATIOT. Captured and tortured in April 1945, by the SS, but gave up nothing. Known associate of Adrian Gallegos and Major Jim Davies.
Gunnar Sønsteby	Norwegian Independent Company 1	Norwegian	1918–2012	DSO, 1939–45 Star, War Cross with three Swords, Commander of the Royal Norwegian Order of St. Olav, Norwegian Police Cross of Honour, Norwegian Defence Cross of Honour, Defence Medal 1940–1945 with rosette, Haakon VII 70th Anniversary Medal, Medal of Freedom with silver palm etc.	Member of Norwegian resistance movement from 1940. Member of Milorg. Organised sabotage by Oslo Gang in 1944–45. Most highly decorated Norwegian of WWII.
V. A. Soskice	att.F	US			OSS
Maurice Southgate	France	British	1913–1990	DSO	Codename 'Hector'
James William Spencer	British		1915–1997		code name "Marks"
Geoffrey Spencer	Germany	British	1920–2015		
M J G de St Genies					
Arthur Staggs					
George Reginald Starr	France	British	1904–1980	MD, DSO	Brother of John Renshaw Starr
John Renshaw Starr	France	British	unk–1996		Brother of George Reginald Starr
Arthur Steele					captured and killed 1944
Brian Stonehouse	France	British	1918–1998	MBE	
Francis Suttill	France	British	1910–1945	DSO	Captured 1943, killed 1945
Violette Szabo	F, Salesman	British	1921–1945	GC, MBE, CdeG	FANY, Codename : Louise, parachuted into France in April 1944, Killed at Ravensbrück concentration camp with Lilian Rolfe and Denise Bloch
Hannah Szenes	Yugoslavia	Hungarian	1921–1944		executed by a firing squad on November 7, 1944, in Budapest

== T ==
Name	SOE Section	Nationality	Born-Died	Awards	Notes
Germaine Tambour	F, Prosper, Physician	French	1903-1945		Killed at Ravensbrück concentration camp with her sister, Madeleine by gas chamber.
Madeleine Tambour	F, Prosper, Physician	French	1908-1945		Killed at Ravensbrück concentration camp with her sister, Germaine by gas chamber.
Jacques Taschereau					
Paul Raymond Tessier	France	British	1916–1944	MiD	
Paul-Émile Thibeault					
Michael Trotobas	France, Farmer	British	1914-1943	Medal of Resistance	Killed in action at Lille, France

== U ==
Name	SOE Section	Nationality	Born-Died	Awards	Notes
Paul L Ullman	F, Stockbroker				Wireless Operator.

== V ==
Name	SOE Section	Nationality	Born-Died	Awards	Notes
Jacques Vaillant de Guélis	France		1907–1945	MBE MC CdeG	Injured in road accident in Germany, May 1945. Died in the UK August 1945.
François Vallée					
Philippe de Vomécourt	France	French	1902-1964		Head of Ventriloquist Network
Pierre de Vomécourt	France	French	1906-1986		Head of Autogyro Network
Arne Værum	Nor.IC 1	Norwegian	1919–1942		KIA in Telavåg, Norway
Arie Van Duyn	Holland	Dutch		OBE	Married Buntie Macklin-Sprake (Radio Operator Trainer)

== W ==
Name	SOE Section	Nationality	Born-Died	Awards	Notes
Nancy Wake	F, Freelance	New Zealand	1912–2011	AC, GM, LdH, CdeG, MR, Medal of Freedom (US)	Codenames : Helene (British), Andree (French), Witch (Ops), Gertie (closest colleagues). Nicknamed 'White Mouse' by the Gestapo as she continued to evade capture by them.
Winifred Watkins	Intelligence 1939–1946	British	1916–unk		Known as 'Betty'
Anne-Marie Walters	F, Starr, Wheelwright	British	1923–1998	ST, CdeG, DM, FGS, MFG, MBE, WM	WAAF Officer. Codename : Colette. January 1944 parachuted into Armagnac area of SW France. Served as a Courier with Yvonne Cormeau (Wireless Operator for Starr circuit.)
Peter Wand-Tetley	Greece	British			previous service with several Raiding Forces
David Whytehead Sibrée					
Odette Wilen	France				
Edward Mountford ("Teddy") Wilkinson	F, Privet	British			Captured, executed
George Alfred Wilkinson					
John Prentice Wilkinson	No.1 SF	British	1915–1945		Killed in action
Jean-Pierre Wimille	France	French	1908–1949		
Pearl Witherington	F, Wrestler	British	1914–2008	MBE, CBE, CdeG, LdH	
Jean Worms					
Dagmar Witherspoon		British	1922–2011		
Christopher Matthew "Colombo" Woods	No.1 SF	British		CMG, MC	Personal memoir of Captain Wood's work in German-occupied Italy (Po river region, North Italy) is preserved in the archives of London's Imperial War Museum

== Y ==
Name	SOE Section	Nationality	Born-Died	Awards	Notes
F. F. E. Yeo-Thomas	France	British	1902–1964	GC, MC*, CdeG, CLdH	Best known by his code name "White Rabbit"
John Young	France	British			Spoke French with a Newcastle accent according to John Goldsmith. Worked in the Dijon region with Diana Rowden. Captured autumn 1943.
John Cuthbert Young					
William Henry Young	Albania +	British	1923-1996	1939-1945 Star, Africa Star, Defence Medal, Italy Star, War Medal 1939 - 1945, Palestine Police Medal, MiD	Shadow Force - under command of Sir Anthony Quayle, Albania Section plus. Later seconded to Palestine Police and MI6 after war ended

== Z ==
Name	SOE Section	Nationality	Born-Died	Awards	Notes
Edward Zeff	France	British	1903-1973	MBE, CdeG	Radio operator. Captured by Germans, survived.
Guido Zembsch-Schreve	France	Dutch	1916–2003	MBE, LdH	Captured by Germans, survived

== Key ==
Note	Description	Explanation
CBE	Commander of The Most Excellent Order of the British Empire	Commander of the British order of chivalry.
CdeG	Croix de Guerre 1939–1945	French military decoration created on September 26, 1939, to honour people who fought with the Allies against the Axis force at any time during World War II
DM	Defence Medal	Instituted in May 1945. Awarded to British Commonwealth subjects for non-operational military and civilian war service during WWII.
DSC	Distinguished Service Cross	British gallantry medal awarded during active operations against the enemy
DSO	Distinguished Service Order	Instituted September 6, 1886. Awarded for meritorious or distinguished service in war.
EM	Médaille des Évadés	Instituted in 1926. Awarded to individuals who were POW and escaped internment or died as a result of their escape.
F	France	SOE (Special Operations Executive) F section operations in France
FANY	First Aid Nursing Yeomanry	British independent all-female unit active in both nursing and intelligence work during the World Wars.
FGS	France and Germany Star	Instituted May 1945. Awarded to British Commonwealth forces who served between June 6, 1944, and May 8, 1945, in France, Belgium, Luxembourg, The Netherlands, Germany, and adjacent sea areas.
GC	George Cross	The highest civil decoration of the United Kingdom. It is highest gallantry award for civilians as well as for military personnel in actions which are not in the face of the enemy or for which purely military honours would not normally be granted.
GM	George Medal	The second highest civil decoration of the United Kingdom It awards civilian gallantry in the face of enemy action and brave deeds more generally.
KCBC	King's Commendation for Brave Conduct	British commendation to acknowledged brave acts by civilians and members of the military in non-warlike circumstances during a time of war or in peacetime where the action would not otherwise be recognised by an existing award
KIA	Killed in Action	A casualty classification generally used by militaries to describe the deaths of their own forces at the hands of hostile forces.
LdH	Ordre national de la Légion d'honneur	French order that is the highest decoration in France.
MBE	Member of the Most Excellent Order of the British Empire	Member of the British order of chivalry.
MFG	Médaille de la Reconnaissance française	"Médaille de la Reconnaissance française". Created July 13, 1917 to honor civilians who had performed acts of heroism in the face of the enemy during WWI without military obligation. Last award : February 14, 1959.
MiD	Mentioned in Despatches	An official report written by a superior officer and sent to the high command, in which is described the person's gallant or meritorious action in the face of the enemy.
MR	Médaille de la Résistance	Established February 9, 1943 by General Charles de Gaulle awarded to individuals who participated in actions against the Axis powers on French soil.
MC	Military Cross	The Military Cross is the third-level military decoration and is awarded in recognition of "an act or acts of exemplary gallantry during active operations against the enemy on land to all members, of any rank in Our Armed Forces…"
ST	1939-1945 Star	Instituted July 8, 1943 and awarded for 180 days of operational service or 60 days of operational flying in WWII.
T	Belgium	SOE (Special Operations Executive) operations in Belgium
WAAF	Women's Auxiliary Air Force	
WM	War Medal 1939-1945	Instituted on August 16, 1945, and issued to subjects of the British Commonwealth who served full-time in the Armed Forces or the Merchant Navy for at least 28 days between September 3, 1939, and September 2, 1945.

== See also ==
- List of female SOE agents
- SOE F Section networks
- SOE in France
- Timeline of SOE's Prosper Network
