= List of female SOE agents =

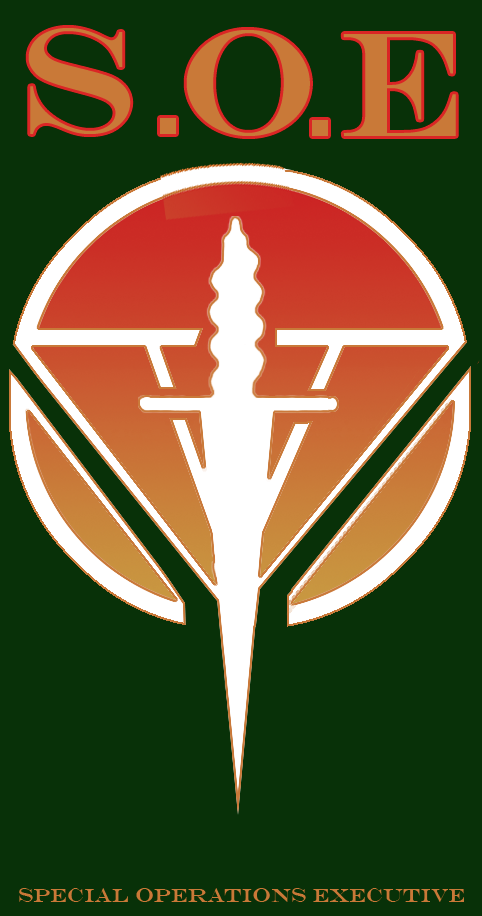

The following is a list of female agents who served in the field for the Special Operations Executive (SOE) during World War II. SOE's objectives were to conduct espionage, sabotage and reconnaissance in occupied Europe (and later, also in occupied Southeast Asia) against the Axis powers, and to aid local resistance movements. Most of SOE's female agents worked in France.

In 1981, the official historian of the SOE, Michael R. D. Foot, said that the staff of SOE consisted of about 10,000 men and 3,000 women. Of that number, "A few highly accomplished and gallant [women] were agents operating in France or Yugoslavia." Foot cautioned that "On these few there is a large popular literature, almost all of it worthless and much of it about the wrong people." The declassification of SOE documents beginning in the 1990s permitted more accurate assessments of agents and their accomplishments.

== Female SOE F Section agents in France ==
Estimates of the number of F Section female agents vary. Thirty-nine female SOE agents were trained in Britain. The following list of forty-one agents is taken from M.R.D. Foot, the official historian of the SOE, with two additions: Madeleine Barclay who served (and died) on a ship contracted to SOE and Sonia Olschanezky, a locally-recruited courier who was executed. Of the forty-one SOE F section female agents listed, a few served in France for as much as two years, most for only a few months. Twenty-five of them survived World War II. Twelve were executed by the Germans, one died when her ship was sunk, two died of disease while imprisoned, and one died of natural causes. Female agents ranged in age from 20 to 53 years.

At the beginning of World War II, women were prohibited by British law from being used in combat roles by the Royal Army, Navy, and Air Force. However, SOE learned in its earliest days from the experience of first female agents (Krystyna Skarbek and Virginia Hall--neither of them with British nationality) that women were uniquely suitable for undercover work. They aroused less suspicion than men and they could travel more easily as men were subject to being impressed for forced labor by the German occupiers. Women agents were usually couriers, traveling by public transportation from place to place to deliver messages and sensitive and prohibited items.

In April 1942, SOE head Colin Gubbins raised the subject of SOE hiring women agents with Prime Minister Winston Churchill and received permission to employ women as agents although the use of women in combat situations was to be denied. The legal fig-leaf to get around the prohibition by the armed services of women in combat was to enroll female SOE agents in the First Aid Nursing Yeomanry (FANY), a civilian organization. Women agents were most commonly used in France.

Most SOE agents were sent to France as part of a network or circuit of three persons consisting of an "organiser" who was the leader of the team, a wireless operator, and a courier. Pearl Witherington was the only woman to officially head an SOE network in France, although others fulfilled that role on occasion.

In addition to this list of female F Section agents in France, eleven women agents of the RF section of SOE were sent to France in 1944. The RF section was under the direction of Charles de Gaulle's Free French Government in exile with SOE lending logistical support and financial assistance. Conversely, F section worked with all factions of the French Resistance although leery of assistance to communists.

According to Foot
Name	Birthplace	Born	Died	Awards	Date of entry		Notes
Francine Agazarian	France	1913	1999	MiD	17 March 1943, Lysander aeroplane		Code name: Marguerite; Courier, Prosper network. Wife of SOE agent Jack Agazarian.
Juliane Aisner	France	1899	1947	KCBC	17 May 1943, Lysander aeroplane		Code name: Clair; Farrier network.
Lise de Baissac	Mauritius	1905	2004	MBE, CdeG, LdH	24 September 1942, parachute; 9 April 1944, Lysander	WAAF	Code name: Odile, Marguerite; Courier, Scientist network. Sister of SOE Agent Claude de Baissac
Madeleine Barclay	France	1911	1943			WRNS	Née: Madeleine Victorine Bayard. Died when HMS Fidelity was sunk on 1 January 1943
Yvonne Baseden	France	1922	2017	MBE, LdH, CdeG	16 March 1944, parachute	WAAF	Code name: Odette: Radio Operator, Scholar network. Captured 26 June 1944, survived Ravensbrück concentration camp
Yolande Beekman	France	1911	1944	MiD	18 September 1943, Lysander aeroplane	WAAF	Code name: Yvonne: Wireless Operator, Musician network. One of four women executed at Dachau, 13 Sept 1944.
Denise Bloch	France	1916	1945	KCBC, LdH, CdeG	2 March 1944, Lysander aeroplane		Code name: Ambroise; Wireless Operator, Clergyman network. Executed at Ravensbrück concentration camp 5 February 1945.
Andrée Borrel	France	1919	1944	CdeG	24 September 1942, parachute		Code name: Denise; Courier, Physician and Prosper networks. Executed at Natzweiler-Struthof concentration camp, 6 July 1944.
Sonya Butt	England	1924	2014	MBE, MiD	28 May 1944, parachute	WAAF	Code name: Blanche; Courier, Headmaster network. Married fellow SOE agent Guy D'Artois. Youngest SOE woman agent.
Muriel Byck	England	1918	1944	MiD	8 April 1944, parachute	WAAF	Code name: Violette; Wireless operator, Ventriloquist network. Died of meningitis at Romorantin Hospital, 23 May 1944.
Blanche Charlet	England	1898	1985	MBE	1 September 1942, boat		Code name: Christiane; Courier, Ventriloquist network. Arrested, escaped from French prison in Sept 1943.
Marie-Thérèse Le Chêne	France	1890		MBE, CdG	31 October 1942, boat		Code name: Adele; Courier, Plane network. Oldest SOE woman agent.
Yvonne Cormeau	China	1909	1997	MBE, LdH, CdeG	22 August 1943, parachute	WAAF	Code name: Annette; Wireless operator, Wheelright network.
Madeleine Damerment	France	1917	1944	LdH, CdeG	29 February 1944, parachute		Code name: Solange; Courier, Bricklayer network. Arrested on landing; one of four women executed at Dachau, 13 September 1944.
Elizabeth Devereux-Rochester	United States	1917	c. 1983	LdH, CdeG	18 October 1943, Hudson aeroplane	FANY (Note: British independent all-female unit active in nursing, motor mechanics and recruited into intelligence work during the World Wars.)	Code name: Elizabeth; Courier, Marksman network. Aka: Elizabeth Reynolds. Arrested 20 March 1944, sent to prisoner of war camp, survived.
Yvonne Fontaine	France	1913	1996	MdlR	25 March 1944, boat	WAAF	Code name: Mimi; Courier, Minister network. Prior to becoming SOE agent worked with Tinker network as Nenette.
Giliana Gerson	Chile	1910			May 1941		First SOE agent sent to France; stayed one month, collected intelligence and documents, such as ration cards which could later be copied by SOE.
Virginia Hall	United States	1906	1982	MBE, DSC (USA)	(1) August 1941; (2) 21 March 1944, boat		Code names: Marie, Diane; Courier, Heckler, Saint networks. Called "Limping lady" due to amputated lower leg. Post-war worked for the CIA
Mary Katherine Herbert	Ireland	1903	1983	CdeG	31 October 1942, boat	WAAF	Code name: Claudine; Courier, Scientist network. First WAAF Officer to join the SOE. Married SOE agent Claude de Baissac, daughter born December 1943, arrested and released 1944.
Ginette Jullian	France	1917	1962		7 June 1944, parachute		Code name: Adele; Wireless Operator, Permit network.
Noor Inayat Khan	Russia	1914	1944	GC, MBE, CdeG, MiD	16 June 1943, Lysander aeroplane	WAAF	Code name: Madeleine; Wireless operator, Cinema, Phono networks. Indian Muslim origin. One of four women executed at Dachau concentration camp, 13 September 1944.
Marguerite Knight	France	1920	2004	MBE, CdeG	6 May 1944, parachute		Code name: Nicole; Courier, Donkeyman network. Known as Peggy
Phyllis Latour	South Africa	1921	2023	MBE, CdeG	1 May 1944, parachute		Code name: Genevieve; Wireless operator, Scientist network.
Madeleine Lavigne	France	1912	1945		23 May 1944, parachute		Code name: Isabelle; Wireless operator, courier, Silversmith network. Died in Paris of an embolism on 24 February 1945.
Cicely Lefort	England	1900	1945	CdeG, MiD	16 June 1943, Lysander aeroplane	WAAF	Code name: Alice; Courier, Jockey network. Executed at Ravensbrück concentration camp c. 5 February 1945.
Vera Leigh	England	1903	1944	KCBC	23 May 1943, Lysander aeroplane		Code name: Simone; Courier, Inventor Network. Executed at Natzweiler-Struthof concentration camp on 6 July 1944.
Eileen Nearne	England	1921	2010	CdeG, MBE	2 March 1944, Lysander aeroplane		Code name: Rose; Wireless operator, Wizard network. Known as "Didi." Sister of SOE agents Jacqueline & Francis Nearne. Arrested July 1944; escaped Ravensbrück concentration camp, 13 April 1945.
Jacqueline Nearne	England	1916	1982	MBE	25 January 1943, parachute	FANY	Code name: Jacqueline; Courier, Stationer network. Withdrawn April 1944. Sister of SOE agents Eileen & Francis Nearne
Sonia Olschanezky	Germany	1923	1944		Recruited in France		Code name: Tania; Courier, Juggler network. Captured January 1944, executed at Natzweiler-Struthof concentration camp on 6 July 1944
Patricia O'Sullivan	Ireland	1918	1994	CdeG, MBE	22 March 1944, parachute	WAAF	Code name: Simonet; Wireless operator, Fireman network. Returned to England on 5 October 1944.
Eliane Plewman	France	1917	1944	KCBC, CdeG	13 August 1943, parachute		Code name; Gaby; Courier, Monk network. Executed at Dachau concentration camp on 13 September 1944
Lilian Rolfe	France	1914	1945	MBE, CdeG, MiD	5 April 1944 by Lysander aeroplane		Code name: Nadine; Courier, Historian network. Executed 5 February 1945 at Ravensbrück concentration camp
Diana Rowden	England	1915	1944	MBE, CdeG, MiD	16 June 1943, Lysander aeroplane	WAAF	Code name: Paulette; Courier, Acrobat network. Executed 6 July 1944 at Natzweiler-Struthof concentration camp
Yvonne Rudelatt	France	1897	1945	MBE	30 July 1942, boat	WAAF	Code name: Jacqueline; Courier, Physician network. Died of typhus at Bergen-Belsen concentration camp, c. 24 Apr 1945.
Odette Sansom	France	1912	1995	GC, MBE, LdH	31 October 1942, boat	FANY	Code name: Lise; Courier, Spindle network. First woman to be awarded the George Cross. Also known by the surnames "Hallowes" and "Churchill." Survived Ravensbruck Concentration Camp.
Krystyna Skarbek	Poland	1908	1952	GM, OBE, CdeG	6 July 1944, parachute		Code name: Pauline; Courier, Jockey network. Known also by her nom de guerre Christine Granville. British agent since 1939 in Eastern Europe and the Middle East. Murdered in 1952.
Violette Szabo	France	1921	1945	GC, CdeG	5 April 1944, parachute; 7 June 1944, parachute		Code name: Louise; Courier: Salesman network. Executed c. 5 Feb 1945 at Ravensbrück
Nancy Wake	New Zealand	1912	2011	GM, LdH, CdeG	29 April 1944, parachute		Code name: Helene; Courier, Stationer network. 1940-43: Pat O'Leary escape line. The "White Mouse."
Anne-Marie Walters	Switzerland	1923	1998	MBE, CdeG	4 January 1944, parachute		Code name: Colette; Courier, Wheelright network. Married name Ann-Marie Comert
Odette Wilen	England	1919	2015		11 April 1944, parachute		Code name: Sophie; Courier, Labourer network. Married Santiago Strugo Garay, head of the Spanish escape network.
Pearl Witherington	France	1914	2008	MBE, CBE, CdeG	22 September 1943, parachute		Code names: Marie, Pauline; Courier, Stationer network. Organiser, Wrestler network. "Highly successful."

== Female SOE agents in other countries ==
Name	Nationality	Born	Died	Awards	Date of entry	Notes
Lorraine Adie	British	1916	2013			Married American OSS agent Miles Copeland, Jr. SOE 1940-1942; Served in Middle East.
Maddalena Cerasuolo	Italian	1920	1999	MBE	3 missions, October 1943 to February 1944	Code name: Maria Esposito, C22; sabotage missions, resistant
Alix D'Unienville	Mauritian	1919	2015	MBE, LdeH, CdeG	31 March 1944, parachute	Code name: Myrtil; Courier, Oronte network. Arrested June 6, 1944, escaped en route to a prison camp in Germany.
Hannah Szenes	Hungarian / British Palestine	1921	1944		Parachuted into Yugoslavia, March 14, 1944	Captured and executed in Budapest
Danielle Georgette Reddé	French	1911	2007	British Empire Medal, MBE, Colonial Medal (French), Combatant's Cross (French), Croix de Guerre (French), Légion d’Honneur (French), Order of the Million Elephants and the White Parasol (Kingdom of Laos), Resistance Medal (French)	Parachuted into Japanese occupied Indochina and served in the Technical Archives office in Saigon	Also operated in France, aliases Camille Fournier or Édith Daniel.
Haviva Reik	Slovakian / British Palestine	1922	1944		14 September 1944, parachuted into Slovakia	Executed in Kremnička, Slovakia amongst local Jews
Sara Braverman	Romanian / British Palestinian	1918	2013		Parachuted into Yugoslavia, July 1944	Was mostly with partisan camps in the mountains before evacuation to Italy
Elaine Madden	Belgian / British / Australian	1923	2012	Croix de Guerre (Belgium); Mentioned in Despatches (UK)	August 1944	aliases: Elaine Meeus, Imogen, Alice; fluent in English, French, and Flemish
Berthe Mayer	British	1913	1981	MBE	Already on Madagascar	Served on Madagascar with her husband, Percy Mayer. Code name DZ/60
Elżbieta Zawacka	Polish	1909	2009	Order of the White Eagle among many other awards (Polish)	Parachuted to Poland, Sept 1943	Had already served in Polish resistance. Aliases: Zelma, Zo; fluent in Polish, German, some French, and English
Krystyna Skarbek	Polish/British	1908	1952	OBE, George Medal (British), Croix de Guerre (French);	Served in Poland 1939-41, Egypt & Middle East 1941-44, France 1944	Aliases: Christine Granville, Pauline Armand; fluent in Polish, French and English

== Key ==
Note	Description	Explanation
ATS	Auxiliary Territorial Service	SOE Agents who were ATS officers are highlighted in italics
GC	George Cross	The highest civil decoration of the United Kingdom. It is highest gallantry award for civilians as well as for military personnel in actions which are not in the face of the enemy or for which purely military honours would not normally be granted.

== See also ==
- List of SOE agents
- SOE F Section networks
- SOE in France
- Timeline of SOE's Prosper Network
- Clare Mulley, The Spy Who Loved, the secrets and lives of Christine Granville, Britain's first female special agent of the Second World War (Macmillan, 2012)
