= Jean Coleman (officer) =

Jean Henri Coleman
- Born: 29 July 1908; Neuilly-sur-Seine, France
- Died: 21 May 1982 (aged 73)
- Military career
- Allegiance: United Kingdom
- Branch: Royal Naval Volunteer Reserve
- Service years: 1940 – 1945
- Rank: Lieutenant
- Units: Helford Flotilla, Special Operations Executive
- Conflicts: World War II
- Awards: MBE (UK); Médaille de la Résistance (France); Croix de Guerre avec Palmes (France)

Jean Henri Coleman (29 July 1908 – 21 May 1982) was a member of the British Special Operations Executive during World War II.

== Biography ==
Coleman was born in Neuilly-sur-Seine, France, the son of John Henry Coleman, an English banker, and Eugenie Eulalie Rime, originating from Switzerland. He married Deirdre Brownlow in 1943.

=== Wartime exploits ===
After the outbreak of the Second World War, Coleman escaped from France to the United Kingdom. He enlisted in the Royal Navy in October 1940 as a stoker. He took part in the Dieppe raid in 1942, and joined the Helford Flotilla until April 1943 when he was promoted to Sub-Lieutenant, RNVR.

He then joined SOE with a codename "Victor". After several unsuccessful attempts, he was parachuted into France on 15 September 1943 and joined the Acolyte network around Lyons. He ran the circuit after Robert Lyon had been arrested in May 1944, until his escape and return in June. He returned to England on 15 September 1944.

In 1945–1946, he was British Naval Liaison Officer in Calais.

He was awarded the MBE, the Médaille de la Résistance and the Croix de Guerre avec Palmes.

Vera Atkins wrote this obituary following Jean Coleman's death :

The first thing to say about Jean is that he had in full measure that all too rare quality, charm. This is what secured for him, within hours of meeting her, the delightful Deirdre Brownlow, daughter of General Brownlow. They met at a dinner at Claridge's, became engaged before dawn and were married by Special Licence the following day. It was a marriage stormy at times but never dull, which produced three lovely daughters and during the years of his sad decline Deirdre supported, nursed and protected him from the outside world. Only his utter devotion to "Darling" (his name for her) can perhaps explain the source from which she drew her strength. After several unsuccessful attempts, Jean was dropped on 15 September 1943 to a circuit organised by Robert Lyon based on the town of the same name with a branch in the Roanne area to which Jean was attached. For over a year he was in charge of parachute and sabotage operations of which the following are mentioned in his Citation for the Croix de Guerre avec Palme: "Attack on the bridge at Régny on the Roanne/Lyon line, derailment of troop train between Roanne and Saint-Germain-des-Fossés, attack on train between Roanne and Saint-Étienne and destruction of the Pont de Changy. He took part in a number of guerilla actions, notably dispersing a German convoy near Mérigny on 22 August 1944. The Citation praises not only his courage but also his tact which gained for him the friendship as well as the admiration of his French comrades". Unfortunately, towards the end of Jean's life, business worries and disappointments led to a nervous breakdown but until the end he managed to retain much of his courage, humour and undeniable charm.

— Vera Atkins
