= List of SOE F Section networks and agents =

This article lists the clandestine networks, also known as circuits, (réseaux in French) established in France by F Section of the British Special Operations Executive during World War II. The SOE agents assigned to each network are also listed. SOE agents, with a few exceptions, were trained in the United Kingdom before being infiltrated into France. Some agents served in more than one network and are listed more than once.

The clandestine networks and agents were "dedicated to encourage and aid resistance" to the German occupation of the country. Activities included gathering intelligence, organizing and supplying indigenous resistance groups, and sabotaging transportation, communications, and industrial facilities. A typical SOE network had three agents: 1. Circuit organiser: leader, planner, and recruiter of new members. 2. Wireless Radio Operator: send and receive wireless messages to and from SOE headquarters in London, encode and decode messages, maintain wireless sets. 3. Courier or messenger: travel between organiser, wireless operator, and resistance groups to deliver and receive messages, and, on occasion, deliver explosives and other equipment. Large networks sometimes had more than one courier and wireless operator.

Each network was given a name and each agent belonging to the network had one or more code names and aliases which he used in France. For example, George Reginald Starr was the organiser of SOE's Wheelwright network and known as "Hilaire" to French contacts in the Resistance and to other SOE personnel.

Sixty SOE F Section networks are listed below as operating in France during World War II. Forty-three circuits were no longer existent at the time that France was fully liberated from German control of which 31 had been destroyed by the Germans.

Approximately 470 SOE agents served in France during World War II. The Valençay SOE Memorial in Valençay, France lists the names of 91 men and 13 women who were killed, executed, or died in prison while serving as SOE agents.

The field agents and networks were supported by F Section headquarters in London. The staff of F Section consisted of 24 people in 1944. Its key members were leader Maurice Buckmaster, assistant Vera Atkins, and deputy Nicholas Bodington. Jacques de Guélis was briefing officer, Gerrard Morel was signals officer, Robert Bourne-Patterson was planning officer, Selwyn Jepson was the recruiting officer, and Leo Marks was in charge of coding and cyphers. To maintain operational secrecy, the SOE was not publicly acknowledged and functioned throughout most of the war under the cover name Inter-Services Research Bureau (ISRB). F Section headquarters were on Baker Street but meetings with agents took place at apartments in Orchard Court. Administration, training, transportation, technology, etc. were handled by other SOE sections. SOE employment totaled about 13,000.

== London Headquarters and the Special Training Schools ==
The administrative heart of F Section was centered at 64 Baker Street in London, although the rapid expansion of the organization necessitated the requisition of several nearby buildings to house various country sections. To maintain strict operational secrecy, the SOE was never publicly acknowledged during the conflict and functioned throughout most of the war under the bureaucratic cover name of the Inter-Services Research Bureau (ISRB). While high-level planning and coordination occurred within these London offices, sensitive pre-mission briefings and final meetings with agents were typically conducted in private apartments at Orchard Court to avoid the visibility associated with official military headquarters.

The preparation of agents for infiltration into occupied France was carried out through an extensive network of Special Training Schools (STS), which were primarily established in requisitioned country estates across the United Kingdom. This led to the popular contemporary quip that SOE stood for the "Stately 'Omes of England." These stations provided specialized and rigorous instruction tailored to the agent's specific role in the field. For instance, Station XVII at Brickendonbury Manor in Hertfordshire focused on the technicalities of sabotage and industrial subversion, while the rugged and isolated terrain of STS 21 at Arisaig House in Inverness-shire provided the ideal setting for intensive commando-style training in silent killing and the use of explosives.

Beyond paramilitary skills, the training infrastructure included dedicated facilities for wireless telegraphy and Morse code, parachute jumping, and specialized "finishing schools." In these final stages, agents perfected their French cover identities and underwent simulated Gestapo interrogations to ensure they could withstand the immense psychological and physical pressures of operating behind enemy lines. This comprehensive system ensured that by the time an agent was parachuted into France, they were equipped with both the technical expertise and the clandestine tradecraft necessary to sustain the resistance networks.

== Networks and personnel ==
Most names of networks and dates for the operations of individual networks are from M. R. D. Foot's SOE in France (2004), pages 466-467. A few come from Maurice Buckmaster's They Fought Alone (2014), pages 282-299. Dates of network operations are inclusive; some networks had lengthy periods of inactivity within the dates cited. Individual agents may have served in more than one network or during only part of the time the network was operational.

=== Acrobat (September 1942 to May 1944) ===
- John Renshaw Starr (1908-1996), organiser, code names "Emile" and "Bob," captured, survived
- Diana Rowden (1915–1944), courier, code name "Paulette," executed
- John Cuthbert Young (1907–1944), wireless operator, code name "Gabriel", executed

=== Author/Digger (September 1943 to August 1944) ===
- Jacques Poirier (1922–2006) organiser, survived
- Louis Bertheau (1919–1944), wireless operator, captured, executed

=== Autogiro/Autogyro (March 1941 to August 1942) ===
- Pierre de Vomécourt (1906-1986), organiser, code names "Etienne", "Lucas", and "Sylvain"
- Georges Bégué (1911–1993), wireless operator; the first SOE agent to be sent to France, arriving by parachute the night of 5/6 May 1941.
- André Bloch (1914–1942), wireless operator
- Marcel Clech (1905–1944), wireless operator. code name "Bastien"
- Henri Sevenet (1914-1944), courier.

=== Bricklayer (November 1942 to February 1944) ===
- France Antelme (1900–1944), organiser, Code name "Dumontet"
- Madeleine Damerment (1917–1944), courier, code name "Solange"

=== Butler (August 1942 to August 1944) ===
- Jean Bouguennec (1912–1944), organiser, code name "Max"
- Marcel Fox, courier, code name "Ernest"

=== Carte (September 1941 to May 1943) ===
- Andée Girard, (1901–1968), organiser

=== Chancellor (June to September 1944) ===
- George Millar, organiser

=== Chestnut (May 1942 to August 1943) ===
- William Grover-Williams (1903–1945), organiser, code name "Sebastien"
- Robert Benoist (1904–1944), code name "Lionel"
- Jean-Pierre Wimille (1908–1949)
- Robert Dowlen (1907–1945), wireless operator, code name "Richard"

=== Cinema/Photo (January 1943 to February 1944) ===
- Emile Garry (1909–1944), organiser
- Noor Inayat Khan (1914–1944), wireless operator, code name "Madeleine"

=== Clergyman (October 1943 to August 1944) ===
- Robert Benoist (1904–1944), organiser, code name "Lionel" (See also: Chestnut)
- Jean-Pierre Wimille (1908–1949) See also: Chestnut
- Denise Bloch (1916–1945), courier, wireless operator, code name 'Ambroise"

=== Detective (July 1942 to August 1944) ===
- Henri Sevenet (1914–1944), organiser
- Brian Stonehouse (1918–1998), wireless operator, code name "Celestine"

=== Diplomat (October 1943-August 1944) ===
- Adher Pierre Arthur Watt, organiser, code name "Geoffroi", survived.

=== Ditcher (October 1943-September 1944) ===
- Albert Browne-Bartroli, organiser, code name "Tiburce", survived

=== Donkeyman (July 1942 to August 1944) ===
- Marguerite Knight (1920–2004), courier, code name, "Nicole"
- Odette Sansom (1912–1995), courier

=== Farmer (November 1942 to September 1944) ===
- Michael Trotobas (1914–1943), organiser

=== Farrier (December 1942 to May 1944) ===
- Juliane Aisner, courier, code name Clair

=== Fireman (March 1944 to September 1944) ===
- Patricia O'Sullivan, wireless operator, code name "Simonet"

=== Footman (January to September 1944) ===
- George Hiller — organiser
- Cyril Arthur Watney -- code name "Eustache," wireless operator, survived

=== Freelance (April 1944 to September 1944) ===
- Nancy Wake, courier, code name Helene, survived.

=== Headmaster (September 1942 to August 1944) ===
- Sydney Hudson, organiser, code name Audine
- Francisque Eugene Bec (1905-1944), instructor
- Sonya Butt, courier, code name "Blanche"
- Brian Dominic Rafferty (1919-1945), courier, organiser, code name "Dominique"

=== Heckler/Saint (September 1941 to August 1944) ===
- Virginia Hall, courier, code names "Marie" and "Diane"

=== Historian (April 1944 to August 1944) ===
- George Alfred Wilkinson, organizer, code name "Etienne", executed.
- Lilian Rolfe, courier, code name "Nadine", executed.

=== Inventor (September 1942 to December 1943) ===
- Vera Leigh, courier, code name "Simone", executed.
- Marcel Clech (1905-1944), wireless operator, code name "Bastien"

=== Jockey (March 1943 to September 1944) ===
- Francis Cammaerts, organiser, code name "Roger"
- Christine Granville, courier, code name "Pauline"
- Cecily Lefort, courier, code name "Alice."

=== Juggler (July 1942 to August 1944) ===
- Jean Alexandre Worms (1909-1945), organiser, code name "Robin," executed.
- Jacque Weil (1903-1868) wireless operator, code name "Jacques"
- Sonia Olschanezky, courier, code name "Tania", executed.

=== Labourer (April to June 1944) ===
- Elisée Allard (1906–1944), courier, code name "Baudouin"
- Odette Wilen, code name "Sophie", wireless operator, survived

=== Marksman (July 1942 to September 1944) ===
- Elizabeth Devereux-Rochester, courier, code name "Elizabeth"

=== Minister (March to September 1944) ===
- Dennis John Barrett (1916-1944), wireless operator, code name "Honore"
- Yvonne Fontaine, courier, code name "Mimi"

=== Monk (June 1943 to March 1944) ===
- Eliane Plewman, courier, code name "Gaby"

=== Monkeypuzzle (July 1942 to August 1943) ===
- Marcel Clech (1905-1944), wireless operator, code name "Bastien"

=== Musician (November 1942 to August 1944) ===
- Yolande Beekman, courier, code name "Yvonne"

=== Parson (June 1943 to February 1944) ===
- George Clement (1917-1944), wireless operator, code name "Edouard"
- Henri Gaillot (1896-1944), code name "Ignace"

=== Permit (July to September 1944) ===
- Gerard Dedieu – organiser
- Ginette Jullian, wireless operator, code name "Adele"

=== Prosper/Physician (June 1942 to August 1943) ===
SOE's most important network in 1942-1943. Agents continued to be sent to the Prosper network for some time after it was infiltrated and many members captured.

- Francis Suttill (1910-1945), organiser, code name "Prosper," executed
- Francine Agazarian, courier, code name "Marguerite"
- Jack Agazarian, wireless operator, code name "Marcel"; executed
- James Frederick Amps (1908-1945), deputy, code name "Tomas"
- Andrée Borrel (1919–1944), courier, code name "Denise," captured and executed
- Yvonne Rudelatt, courier, code name "Jacqueline," died
- Gilbert Norman, wireless operator, deputy to Suttill, code name "Archambaum, captured and executed

=== Pimento (July 1942 to August 1944) ===
- Anthony Brooks, organiser

=== Plane (April 1942 to August 1943) ===
- Marie-Thérèse Le Chêne, courier, code name "Adele"

=== Privet (July 1942 to June 1943) ===
- Edward (Teddy) Mountford Wilkinson (1902-1944), organiser, code name "Alexandre, executed."

=== Prunus (April 1942 to April 1943) ===
- Maurice Pertschuk, organiser
- Marcus Bloom (1907-1944), wireless operator, code name "Urbain"
- Philippe de Gunzbourg, courier

=== Scientist (July 1942 to August 1944 ===
- Lise de Baissac, courier. code name "Marguerite"
- Mary Katherine Herbert, courier, code name "Claudine"
- Phyllis Latour, wireless operator, code name "Genevieve"

=== Scullion (April to September 1943) ===
- Phillip John Amphlett (1921-1945), saboteur

=== Shipwright (May 1944 to September 1944) ===
- Amédée Maingard, organiser, code name "Dede", survived.
- Ivan Justin (Ian) Woolf, Dakota expert, code name 'Jean Paul", survived.

=== Silversmith (May to September 1944) ===
- Henri Borosh - organiser.
- Madeleine Lavigne, wireless operator, code name "Isabelle"

=== Spindle (January 1942 to July 1943) ===
- Adolphe Rabinovitch, wireless operator
- Odette Sansom, courier, code name "Lise"

=== Spruce/Gardener (September 1941 to August 1944) ===
- Edward (Ted) Zeff, code named "Georges 53", wireless operator, survived capture

=== Stationer (January 1943 to April 1944) ===
- Maurice Southgate, organiser
- Jacqueline Nearne, courier, code name "Jacqueline"
- Pearl Witherington, courier, code names "Marie" and "Pauline"

=== Stockbroker/Judge (April 43 to September 1944) ===
- Éric Cauchi (1917-1944), arms instructor, code name "Pedro"

=== Ventriloquist (May 1941 to November 1942) ===
- Philippe de Vomécourt, organiser, code name "Gauthier" and "Antoine"
- Muriel Byck (1918-1944), wireless operator, code name "Violette"
- Blanche Charlet, courier, code name "Christiane"

=== Wheelwright (November 1942 to September 1944) ===
- George Reginald Starr (1904-1980), code name "Hilaire," organiser
- Anne-Marie Walters, code name "Colette", courier, survived.

=== Wizard (March 1944 to July 1944) ===
- Eileen Nearne (1921–2010), wireless operator, code name "Rose", captured, survived.

=== Woodcutter (July to September 1944) ===
- Albert Victor Woerther, organizer, code name "Justin", survived.

=== Wrestler (May 1944 to September 1944) ===
- Pearl Witherington (1914–2008), organiser, code name "Marie" and "Pauline", survived.
- Henri Cornioley

== Map of networks as of June 1943 ==
The map below shows the major SOE F Section networks which existed in France in June 1943, based on the map published in Rita Kramer's book "Flames in the Field" (Michael Joseph Ltd, 1995).

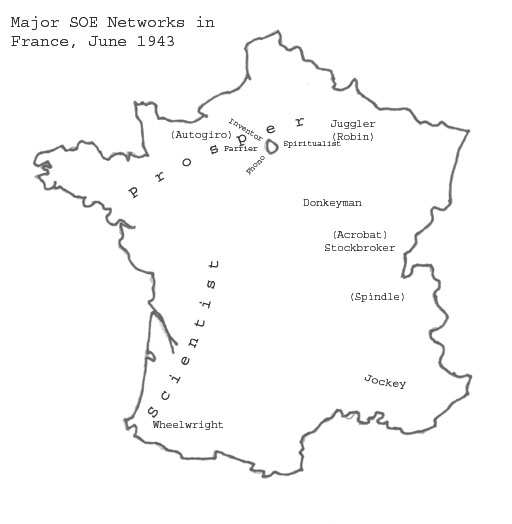

Note: The map does not show the correct location of the original Autogiro network, which operated in the Paris area and did not exist after the spring of 1942. However the network was later revived by Francis Suttill, organiser of Prosper.

== See also ==
- List of SOE agents
- SOE F Section Codenames & Aliases
