= Maurice Southgate =

British RAF & SOE officer (1913-1990)

- Born: 20 June 1913; Paris, France
- Died: 17 March 1990 (aged 76)
- Military career
- Allegiance: United Kingdom
- Branch: Royal Air Force; Special Operations Executive
- Service years: 1939–1945
- Rank: Squadron Leader
- Unit: Section F
- Commands: Stationer network
- Conflicts: World War II
- Awards: Distinguished Service Order

Maurice Southgate DSO (20 June 1913 – 17 March 1990), code named Hector, was an officer in the Royal Air Force and an agent of the United Kingdom's clandestine Special Operations Executive (SOE) organization during World War II. The purpose of SOE was to conduct espionage, sabotage, and reconnaissance in occupied Europe against the Axis powers, especially Nazi Germany. SOE agents allied themselves with resistance groups and supplied them with weapons and equipment parachuted in from England.

Southgate was the organiser (leader) of the SOE's STATIONER network (or circuit) operating in a large area centered on Châteauroux in central France and Tarbes in southern France from 1942 to 1944. He was captured by the SS in Montluçon in 1944 and deported to Buchenwald concentration camp where he survived until its liberation by American forces in 1945. Southgate was regarded by Maurice Buckmaster, head of SOE's French Section, as one of his best agents.

== Early life ==
Southgate was born in Paris to British parents, educated at a technical college, and started an upholstery business.

With the coming of World War II, Southgate was part of the British Expeditionary Force, and in June 1940 was evacuated from Saint-Nazaire on the RMS Lancastria, which was sunk by German aircraft. Fortunately, Southgate was able to swim away, being picked up by another vessel which later docked in Falmouth, Cornwall. In England he was posted by the RAF to the Air Ministry where he became reacquainted with his childhood friend Pearl Witherington, who later became an SOE agent working for Southgate. Another SOE agent, John Starr, was also a childhood friend. In May 1942 Southgate was recommended to SOE's French Section where he was accepted for training in July.

== Special Operations Executive ==
Southgate impressed his SOE trainers and superiors with his "serious and thorough approach" and he was designated as the organiser (leader) of a new SOE network which would be called "Stationer." On the night of 25/26 January 1943 he and his courier, Jacqueline Nearne, parachuted into France. Southgate's task was to organize and work with resistance organizations in two distinct areas, first, around Vierzon, Châteauroux and Limoges, and second, 450 kilometres (280 miles) south-west near the border with Spain around Tarbes. Southgate had two experienced collaborators, both well-regarded by SOE, on the ground in France: Auguste Chatraine, a socialist farmer and politician in Tendu and Charles Rechenmann, an engineer and former soldier, in Tarbes. Both of them would later be captured and executed by the Germans. A wireless operator and second in command, Amédée Maingard, joined Southgate in April 1943 and in September 1943, Pearl Witherington arrived by parachute to became Southgate's second courier.

Southgate's two areas of operation were totally different. Chantraine recruited for SOE among the communists of the Francs-Tireurs et Partisans (FTP). Rechenmann recruited almost 100 former soldiers for SOE, all of whom had escaped from prisoner-of-war camps in Germany. Southgate was one of only a few SOE agents who had success working with communists and he also recruited "exceedingly tough near-gangsters." By the end of the summer of 1943, Southgate's two groups of resisters, called maquis, had begun minor acts of sabotage of railroads, power stations, and aircraft factories.

In October 1943, Southgate returned to England to report on his progress. He told SOE that his network was too large to be handled by one man and was relieved of his duties around Tarbes. He returned to France in January 1944, parachuting near Toulouse, to organize and supply the maquis in central France with the objective of supporting with sabotage the upcoming Allied invasion of France. In April 1944, he reported that he had 2,500 maquis fighters ready to undertake guerrilla action against the occupying Germans.

Southgate's wife, Josette, was evacuated by clandestine SOE aircraft from France to England on 9–10 April 1944. Josette was accompanied on the flight by Jacqueline Nearne, Southgate's long-serving courier.

=== Capture and prison ===
In the words of Pearl Witherington, Southgate was "incredibly security minded." He said the two most dangerous times for an SOE agent were his first week in France when he was unfamiliar with the environment and after being in the country for 6 months or more when he became complacent. Southgate had been in France more than a year when he was captured. On Monday 1 May 1944, Southgate and the other agents of his network were exhausted from preparations for the Allied invasion (6 June 1944). Returning to the city of Montlucon after meeting agents in the countryside, a weary Southgate failed to exercise his usual caution and did not notice a Citroën, a car favored by the German SS, parked down the street from the house where he was to meet with his newly-arrived wireless operator, René Mathieu. When he opened the door of the house German SS agents were there to greet him.

Southgate was initially sent to 84 Avenue Foch, the headquarters of the Sicherheitsdienst (the SS Intelligence agency) in Paris, for interrogation. In August, he was with a group of 36 SOE agents deported, just before the fall of Paris to the allied armies, to Buchenwald Concentration Camp in Germany. In September sixteen of them were hanged. Southgate was overlooked for execution as he had feigned a stomach illness to get into the hospital but he also suffered from a genuine illness. After being dismissed from the hospital, Southgate was assigned to work in the tailor shop of the camp. He and three other SOE agents hid in the "Little Camp" part of Buchenwald to avoid being found and executed by the SS. The four agents survived. American forces captured Buchenwald on 11 April 1945. freeing the prisoners. On 13 April, SOE in London received a report from the Red Cross in Buchenwald stating that Southgate was "possibly still Alive (sic)." SOE had known nothing about the fate of Southgate after his capture until that message.

The Stationer network remained operational despite Southgate's capture. Maingard and Witherington divided Southgate's network. Maingard became the leader of the Shipwright Network and Witherington headed the Wrestler network, the only woman to be in charge of an SOE French network. Both of them carried out many successful sabotage operations after the D-Day landings on 6 June 1944 and both survived World War II. Wireless-operator Mathieu died or was executed while he was in the custody of the Germans.

== Plaudits ==
Southgate was awarded the Distinguished Service Order of the United Kingdom during his incarceration. Maurice Buckmaster, head of SOE's F (French) Section, would later say of Southgate, "he stuck to his job without any thought for his own safety or welfare. He worked long hours—sometimes as many as twenty a day-- and he inspired the fiercest enthusiasm in all who worked with him."

Extracts from Southgate's wartime diary have been published online.
