= Saint-Antoine-du-Queyret =

- Commune
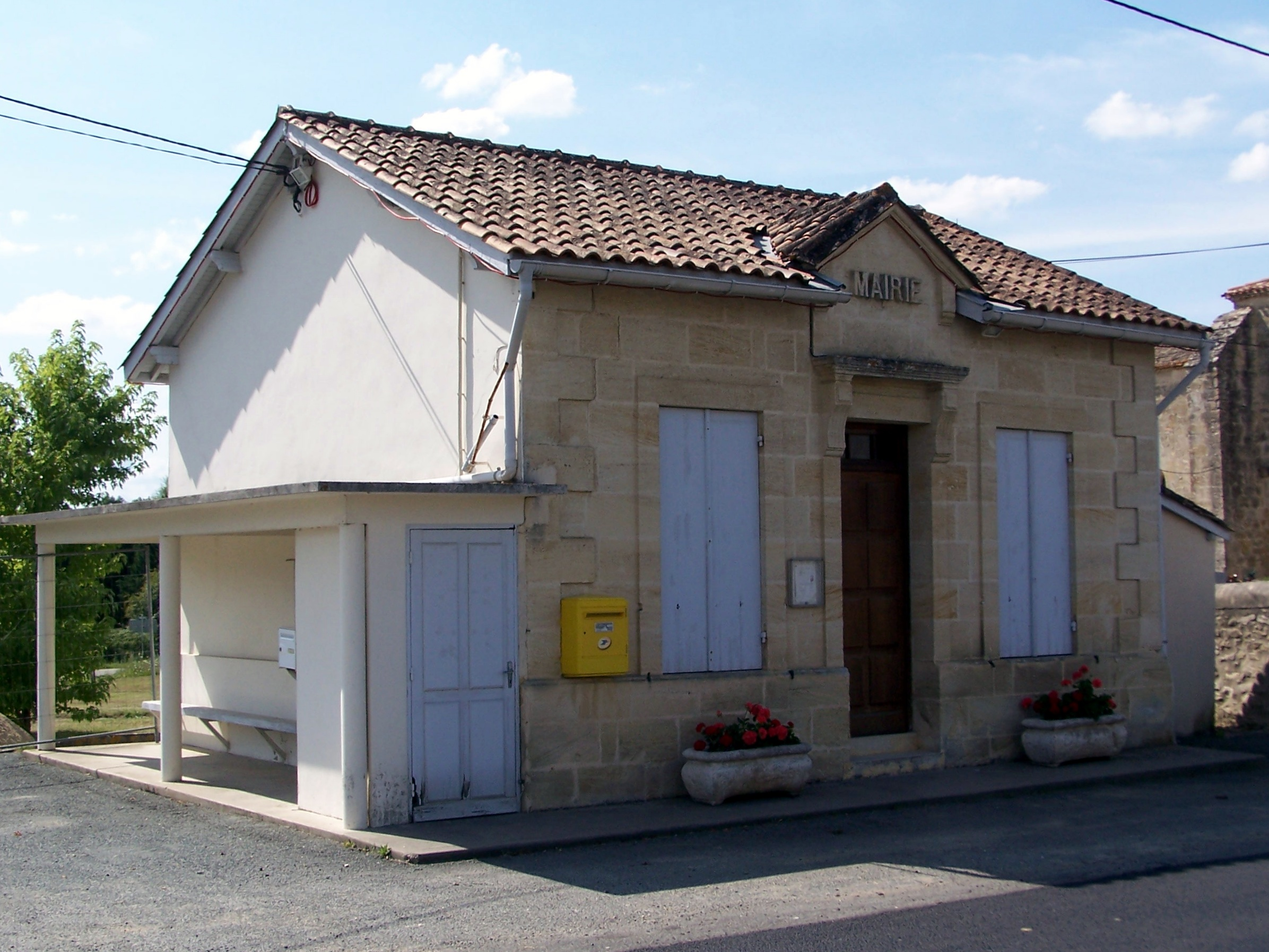
- Town hall
- Location of Saint-Antoine-du-Queyret
- Location within France Location within Nouvelle-Aquitaine
- Coordinates: 44°45′50″N 0°00′38″E
- Country: France
- Region: Nouvelle-Aquitaine
- Department: Gironde
- Arrondissement: Langon
- Canton: Le Réolais et Les Bastides

Government
  - Mayor (2020–2026): Daniel Aubert
- Area^{1}: 6.85 km^{2} (2.64 sq mi)
- Elevation: 125 m (410 ft)
- Highest elevation: 122 m (400 ft)
- Lowest elevation: 40 m (130 ft)
- Population (2023): 62
  - Density: 9.1/km^{2} (23/sq mi)
- Time zone: UTC+01:00 (CET)
  - Summer (DST): UTC+02:00 (CEST)
- INSEE/Postal code: 33372 /33790
- ^{1} French Land Register data, which excludes lakes, ponds, glaciers > 1 km^{2} (0.386 sq mi or 247 acres) and river estuaries.

Saint-Antoine-du-Queyret (French pronunciation: [sɛ̃.t‿ɑ̃twan dy keʁɛ]; Occitan: Sent Antòni dau Cairet) is a commune in the Gironde department in Nouvelle-Aquitaine in southwestern France.

== Population ==
Historical population
Year	Pop.	±% p.a.
1968	122	—
1975	88	−4.56%
1982	100	+1.84%
1990	92	−1.04%
1999	77	−1.96%
2007	94	+2.52%
2012	76	−4.16%
2017	59	−4.94%
2023	62	+0.83%
Source: INSEE

== See also ==
- Communes of the Gironde department
