= Jacques Vaillant de Guélis =

Welsh-born French spy (1907–1945)

Jacques Theodore Paul Marie Vaillant de Guélis
- Born: 6 April 1907; Cardiff, Wales
- Died: 7 August 1945 (aged 38); Lichfield, England
- Burial place: Cathays Cemetery, Cardiff, Wales
- Military career
- Allegiance: United Kingdom
- Service years: 1939–1945
- Rank: Major
- Units: General List; Special Operations Executive; F Section
- Conflicts: Second World War
- Awards: MBE; Military Cross; Croix de Guerre

Major Jacques Theodore Paul Marie Vaillant de Guélis MBE MC (6 April 1907 – 7 August 1945) was a Welsh-born French Special Operations Executive (SOE) agent during the Second World War. de Guélis was initially in the British Expeditionary Force in France in 1940 and later joined SOE and parachuted into France to organise resistance networks. He was badly injured in a motor accident in May 1945 and later died of his injuries in the hospital. He is buried in his home town of Cardiff.

== Biography ==
De Guélis was born in Cardiff on 6 April 1907. His French father, Raoul, was a coal exporter, his mother's name was Marie. He was educated at Wrekin College, Shropshire [1921-1925], and then studied at Magdalen College, Oxford. He held dual nationality but completed his required French national service in the 1930s and then returned to Britain to work in advertising in London and Paris. In 1938, he married Beryl Richardson. The family regularly travelled for holidays at the French family property, in Sancerre, Cher. De Guélis is described by M.R.D. Foot as a "charmer...keenly interested in French politics, brave, adroit, and energetic." He had a handle-bar mustache and was 6 feet four inches tall (193 cm.).

== Second World War ==
=== Interpreter ===
Following the declaration of war in September 1939, de Guélis returned to France to join his unit in Orléans. In early October, 1939 he was then posted as a liaison officer to the British 234 Field Company of Royal Engineers. de Guélis was an interpreter on the staff of Lord Gort, commander of the British Expeditionary Force (BEF) in France. He was later evacuated from Dunkirk in early June but later returned to France via Cherbourg on 12 June to assist other forces to escape.

Following the surrender of France on 22 June 1940, de Guélis fled south to Marseille. He then travelled to neutral Spain via the Pyrenees. Held in an internment camp by Spanish authorities at Miranda del Ebro, his release was organised by the British Embassy. de Guélis then travelled by sea to Glasgow arriving in March 1941.

=== Staff Section F ===
Back in London – on 14 April 1941 – de Guélis, commissioned in the British Army General List (service number 184312), was recruited by Lewis Gielgud to be part of the French Section (F Section – headed by Maurice Buckmaster) of the Special Operations Executive (SOE). His prior experience of the German occupation of France allowed him to pass his experiences onto wireless operators and saboteurs being sent to France. SOE staff members were regarded as knowing too much about the organization to go on missions to foreign countries, but an exception was made in his case.

=== Mission to Vichy France – August 1941 ===
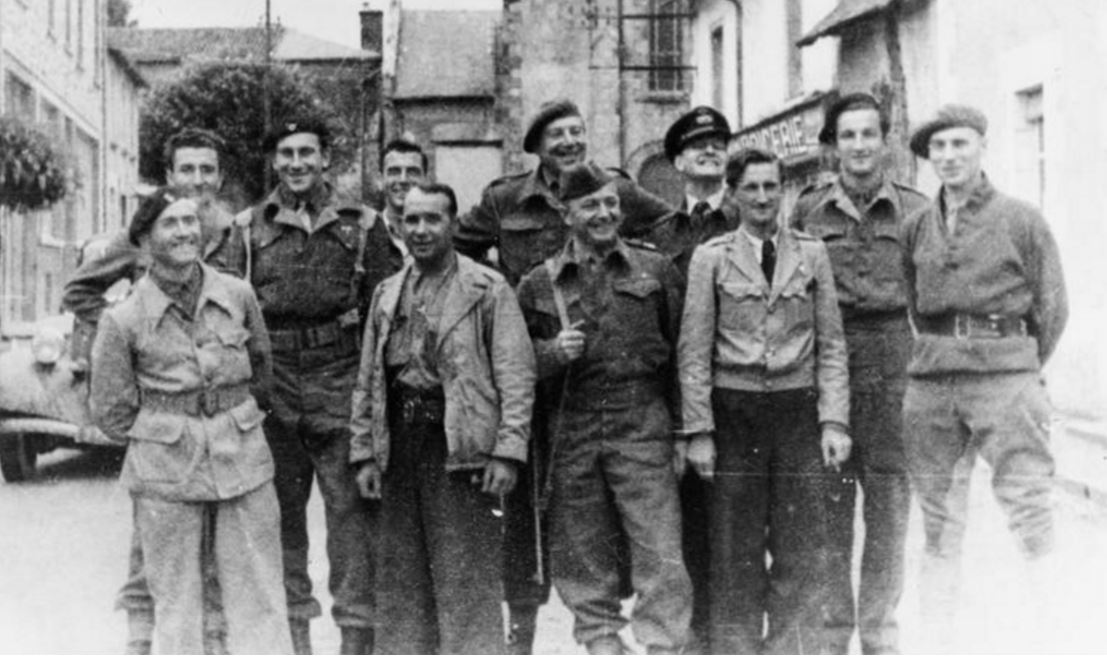
Front (left to right): Colonel Charles (Commandant X, FTPF), Commandant Thomas (Interallied Mission), Marcel Lacouture (local radio operator), Major (M D) McKenzie (Interallied Mission). Back (left to right): Captain R Maloubier (SOE), 2nd Lieutenant Lannoux (WT operator to Major Thomas), 2nd Lieutenant Jean Claude Guiet (US Army attached to SOE), Major Jacques de Guelis (SOE), Squadron Leader Andre Simon, 2nd Lieutenant Jacques Dufour (SOE).

Three months after the arrival of the first SOE agents in France, de Guélis was parachuted into unoccupied Vichy France (along with Gilbert Turck, his radio operator) on the night of 6/7 August 1941, landing near Châteauroux, with a number of objectives:

- contact agents Pierre de Vomécourt and Georges Bégué;
- recruit additional agents (such as radio operators and couriers);
- provide financial assistance where necessary;
- identify locations for clandestine landings on the coast of the Bouches-du-Rhône;
- identify suitable landing strips to enable light aircraft to drop supplies and agents;
- prepare the way for Virginia Hall, the first agent sent as a permanent SOE agent to France;
- acquire paper specimens (ration cards, demobilization certificates) to enable them to be copied in England;

de Guélis was picked up in France the night of 4/5 September 1941 by a Lysander of 138 Squadron; the first time this Special Duties Flight had been done. His arrival at the rendezvous had been severely delayed by an inspection of identity papers by the local police. He arrived back at RAF Tangmere.

For the successful completion of this mission de Guélis was recommended for the MBE by Minister of Economic Warfare, Hugh Dalton.

=== Section AMF Algiers ===
In November 1942, de Guélis was sent to head up the French section of SOE in Algeria. In September 1943 he was sent to conduct operations against the Germans on the island of Corsica. The Germans withdrew from the island in early October and de Guélis returned to London in late October 1943.

=== Low Countries & France ===
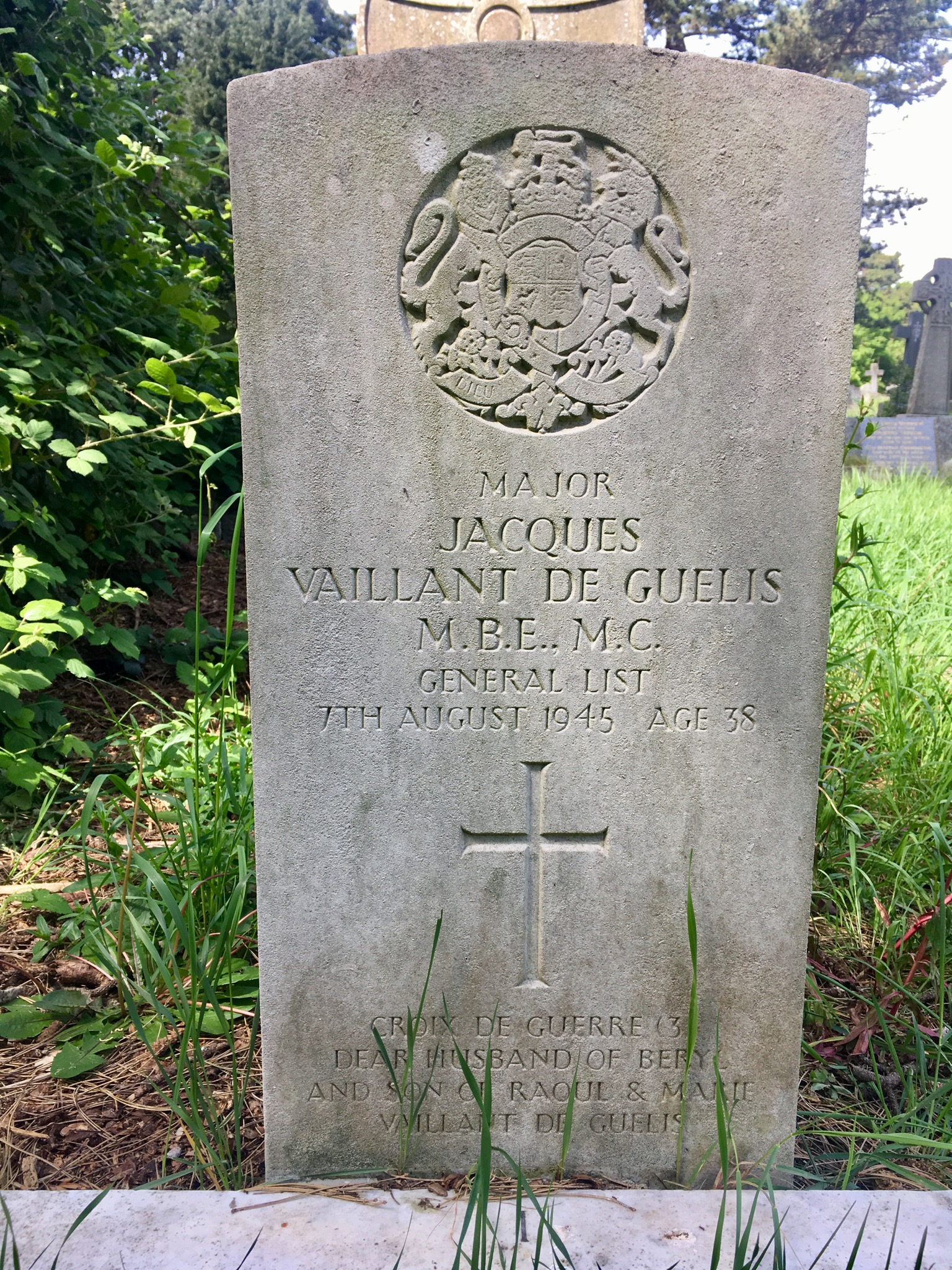
De Guélis's grave at Cathays Cemetery, May 2020

On 19 December 1943 de Guélis was assigned to cover the Low Countries, France and Allied French Directorate as Assistant to Lieutenant-Colonel JRH Hutchinson, to assist with planning for the invasion of France in summer 1944. In April 1944 he attended radio courses on Eureka-Rebecca devices.

=== Mission LINDEN ===
On 7 July 1944 de Guélis was sent to south-western France, to work with resistance forces in the Corrèze area.

== Post war ==
After the liberation of most of France in August and September 1944, de Guélis was assigned to the Special Allied Airborne Reconnaissance Force (SAARF) to help coordinate the resistance and to provide feedback information, mainly on the conditions of prisoners of war and concentration camps. He was sent across Europe to search for information. Whilst in Germany, his car was involved in an accident between Flossenbürg and the Weiden on 16 May 1945. He was transferred to a hospital in Lichfield, England, but died on 7 August 1945.

de Guélis' body was cremated and his ashes interred in Cathays Cemetery in Cardiff, Wales.
