= Madeleine Tambour =

French resistance fighter

Madeleine Tambour (born 18 December 1908 in Paris, France and died in deportation to the Ravensbrück camp on 4 March 1945) was a French actress, active in the French Resistance within several networks including André Girard's Carte network and several networks of the Special Operations Executive.

== Biography ==
=== Family background ===
Madeleine Anne Marie Tambour is the daughter of Alcide Tambour and Anne-Marie Aubin born in 1873. She has an older sister named Germaine.

=== Resistance ===
The family apartment located at 38 avenue de Suffren, Paris XVe, served as a mailbox and clandestine home for a large number of agents of the Special Operations Executive at the end of 1942 and the beginning of 1943, starting with Andrée Borrel and Francis Suttill at their arrival in France.

Her sister Germaine is the secretary of André Girard, founder of the "Carte" network, which wants to be independent of Free France and for this reason obtains the support of the Special Operations Executive (section F of the SOE).

In 1942, Madeleine Tambour was contacted by resistance fighter Andrée Borrel (Denise) who asked her and her sister to shelter many resistance fighters.

=== Arrest, internment and deportation ===
On April 22, 1943, Germaine and Madeleine Tambour were arrested by the Abwehr.

Despite the intervention of several resistance fighters, in particular Françis Suttill, Armel Guerne, Jean Worms and Jacques Weil, to have them released, Madeleine Tambour and her older sister were interned in the prisons of Fresnes, Romainville and Compiègne.

They were finally deported to the Ravensbrück camp in April 1944.

=== Death ===
Madeleine is identified under the registration number 27551 KZ. She died in Ravensbrück, executed by gas, like her sister, on March 4, 1945.

== Acknowledgement ==
A plaque affixed to the facade of the building at 38, avenue de Suffren pays homage to her, as well as to her sister Germaine and to Marie-Louise Monnet.

== Decoration ==
- Medal of the French Resistance posthumously (decree of March 11, 1947)

== Sources and external links ==
- Richard Seiler, La tragédie du réseau Prosper, avril-août 1943, Pygmalion, 2003.
- Henri Noguères, Histoire de la résistance en France de 1940 à 1945, Famot, 1982.
- Jean Lartéguy et Bob Maloubier, Triple jeu, l'espion Déricourt, Robert Laffont, 1992.
- Dimitri Vicheney, Une page de la Résistance dans le XVe arrondissement. Les réseaux du S.O.E. article in Bulletin de la société historique et archéologique du XVe arrondissement de Paris, numéro18, automne 2001, p. 5-17.
