= Berthe Mayer =

Intelligence agent in World War II

Berthe Mayer MBE
- Born: 12 June 1913; Switzerland
- Died: August 1981 (aged 68); Durban, South Africa
- Military career
- Allegiance: United Kingdom
- Branch: Special Operations Executive
- Service years: 1941–1942
- Service number: DZ/60
- Conflicts: Battle of Madagascar, Second World War
- Awards: MBE

Berthe Marcelle Mayer (12 June 1913 – August 1981) worked for the Special Operations Executive (SOE) on Madagascar during the Second World War. She was married to Percy Mayer, an SOE agent. She operated the radio for him, and collected intelligence herself when he was away.

== Second World War ==
When France fell in 1940, Madagascar came under Vichy French control. Berthe and Percy lived on the island, and started sending intelligence reports to SOE in Durban. In October 1941, which Percy was away on business, Berthe gathered and transmitted intelligence about a Vichy merchant ship convoy, leading to the capture of five ships, totalling 40,000 tons. Admiral Godfrey, the director of Naval Intelligence, wrote a personal letter of thanks, describing it as "a very fine show indeed".

When the Allies invaded in 1942, Berthe was living in the Vichy-controlled capital, Tananarive. She continued to gather and send intelligence, despite being told to stop by both her husband and the SOE. The authorities suspected Berthe, and searched the house looking for a radio transmitter, but were unable to find any evidence of her intelligence activities.

In November 1943, Lord Harlech, the High Commissioner to South Africa, presented Berthe with the MBE in recognition of her work.
