= Paddy O'Sullivan =

- Born: 3 January 1918; Dublin, Ireland
- Died: 5 March 1994 (aged 76)
- Military career
- Allegiance: United Kingdom, France
- Branch: Women's Auxiliary Air Force, Special Operations Executive
- Service years: 1941–1945 (WAAF); 1942/43–1945 (SOE)
- Rank: Section officer
- Nicknames: Agent Fireman, Micheline Marcelle Simonet, Josette
- Unit: Fireman
- Awards: Croix de Guerre, MBE

Maureen Patricia O'Sullivan (3 January 1918 – 5 March 1994) was a member of the Special Operations Executive (SOE) during World War II and worked as a wireless operator for the French Section.

Born in Dublin, Ireland in 1918, the daughter of John Aloysius O'Sullivan (1873–1949), an Irish journalist and a German mother, Johanna Repen (1889–1919), who died when Paddy was only 15 months old, she began her schooling at St Louis Convent in Dublin. At the age of seven she was sent to live with an aunt in Belgium. There she attended convent school in Coutrai and then the Athenée Royale in Ostend.

At the beginning of the war she was a nurse working at Highgate Hospital in London. She joined the WAAF on 7 July 1941, as an Aircraft Handler General Duties, and was later promoted to Section officer.

After being recruited by the SOE due to her French language fluency, and becoming a fully fledged wireless operator, Paddy was dropped to the FIREMAN circuit (network) near Limoges few weeks after Eileen Nearne's arrival on 22/23 March March 1944. The weather was extremely foggy and the pilot suggested that they return to England, but Paddy was determined and she jumped. Landing heavily, she was temporarily concussed, but always said her life was saved by the 2 million francs strapped to her back. Paddy's alias was Micheline Marcelle Simonet and her cover story was that she was a 'dame de compagnie' of a doctor in Paris, where she helped the doctor in the surgery as well as with his children; she was taking one month's leave to look for a lost Belgian parent in the Creuse area.

Following successful work with the FIREMAN circuit, Paddy returned to England on 5 October 1944. After her cover was blown in June 1945 she was posted to Force 136 in Calcutta as a liaison officer to work with the French.

== Honours and awards ==
She was awarded the MBE Civil, which was gazetted on 4 September 1945, she was also awarded the Croix de guerre 1939–1945 (France).

Member of the Order of the British Empire (Civil)		1939–1945 Star	
France and Germany Star	Defence Medal	War Medal	Croix de Guerre (France)

== Family ==
She settled in England and went on to marry Eric Alvey, a chartered accountant, and lived near Ilkley, West Yorkshire; the couple had two sons, John and Robin.
