= Odette Wilen =

British Special Operations Executive member

Odette Victoria Wilen (née Sar, latterly Strugo, 25 April 1919 – 22 September 2015) was a member of the UK's Special Operations Executive (SOE) during World War II. She served in occupied France under the code name "Sophie".

== Biography ==
Wilen had a French mother and Czech father and became a naturalised British citizen in 1931. Her father served as an RAF officer. Odette married Dennis Wilen, a Finnish RAF pilot instructor, in June 1940, however he was killed in a flying accident in 1942.

In April 1943, Wilen joined SOE and was seconded to First Aid Nursing Yeomanry (FANY). Initially, she worked for SOE as a Conducting Officer then in February 1944 she requested transfer to training as an active field agent. She trained as a wireless operator for the F Section. After a shortened training period, Wilen was parachuted into France on the night of 11/12 Apr 1944 to join the "Stationer" network in Auvergne, south-west France.

Wilen was sent to France too early in her training to be a competent field wireless operator. Indeed, on her very first night in Montlucon, Maurice Southgate put her to a test and believed she would be "dangerous". The willingness of SOE to send wireless operators into the field with incomplete training attests to the desperate need to fill this important role.

After initial issues regarding placement as a wireless operator with "Stationer", she took up work as a courier with the new "Labourer" network. Her fiancee, Marcel Leccia, was an SOE agent also working with "Labourer".

Unfortunately, Leccia and two comrades were betrayed to the Gestapo in Paris. Leccia was interrogated for 52 days and then killed in Buchenwald by hanging on 14 September 1944. Wilen was saved from arrest by Leccia's sister Mimi, who had heard about her brother's arrest and sought out Wilen to warn her. Mimi moved Wilen to safety moments before the Gestapo arrived and then Wilen was escorted from Paris by bike. Eventually Wilen crossed the Pyrénées on foot to Spain before returning to England in August 1944.

During her exfiltration, she met the head of the Spanish escape network, Santiago Strugo Garay. Despite only knowing her for three days, at the end of the war Santiago left Spain to marry Wilen in London in March 1946. Wilen and Santiago later moved to Buenos Aires.

On 9 August 2007, the British ambassador to Argentina, John Hughes and the Air Attache to Argentina, Wing Commander Simon Dowling, presented her Parachutist Badge to her.

Santiago died in 1997 and Wilen died in 2015, at the age of 96. They are survived by their two children.
