= Giliana Balmaceda =

Special Operations Executive agent

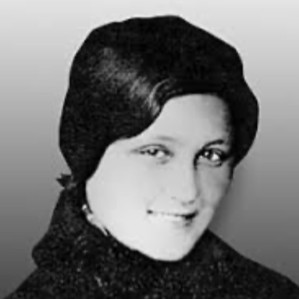
- Giliana Balmaceda - date and photographer unknown
- Born: 29 September 1910; Chile
- Other names: Giliana Gerson
- Occupations: actress and spy
- Employer: Special Operations Executive
- Known for: first SOE female agent into France
- Spouse: Victor Gerson

Giliana Balmaceda became Giliana Gerson (born 1910) was a Special Operations Executive agent during the Second World War. She was the first female SOE agent to be sent to occupied France.

== Life ==
Giliana Virginia Balmaceda Provasoli was born in Chile in 1910. She had worked as an actress in Paris, where she met Englishman, Victor Gerson, a dealer in fine rugs and carpets, whom she married.

On 18 June 1940, at the signing of the armistice, the couple escaped to England, where both joined the Special Operations Executive. Her husband, Victor Gerson, proposed setting up a line of helpers to simplify the exit and entrance of SOE agents, and Balmaceda volunteered to reconnoitre the possibility. In May 1941 she became the first female SOE agent to be sent to France. She proved adept at distinguishing between those who genuinely wanted to help escapees and those who claimed loyalty to the allies even though they were informing the counterintelligence police.

Balmaceda, ostensibly on holiday, travelled freely on her Chilean passport in Vichy France, not yet occupied by Nazi Germany, and compiled a long list of names and addresses of those willing to help and who she believed could be trusted. She preferred to find older couples who were usually at home and who were willing to provide a spare bedroom for the cause. During her three weeks in Vichy France she collected "information about timetables, curfews, the papers civilians had to carry, and the extent of bus and railway controls." The administrative documents used in occupied France, such as ration cards which she collected could be reproduced in London for use by agents on clandestine missions in France. She returned to the United Kingdom through Spain and to the British base at Gibraltar.

On 21 April 1942, her husband, Victor Gerson landed by submarine at Antibes to organise the VIC Escape Line, which provided an escape route from France via Spain back to England for downed airmen, SOE agents, and others.
