= Pearl Witherington =

British agent for French Resistance in World War II

- Born: 24 June 1914; Paris, France
- Died: 24 February 2008 (aged 93); Loire Valley, France
- Military career
- Allegiance: United Kingdom
- Branch: Special Operations Executive; First Aid Nursing Yeomanry
- Service years: 1940–1944
- Nicknames: Marie, Pauline
- Units: Stationer, Wrestler
- Conflicts: Second World War
- Awards: Commander of the Order of the British Empire; Legion of Honour; Croix de Guerre; Resistance Medal

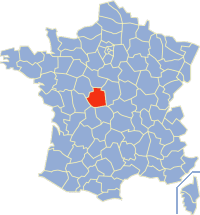
Witherington mostly operated in Indre Department, 220 kilometres (140 miles) south of Paris.

Cecile Pearl Witherington Cornioley, CBE (24 June 1914 – 24 February 2008), code names Marie and Pauline, was an agent in France for the United Kingdom's clandestine Special Operations Executive (SOE) during the Second World War. The purpose of SOE was to conduct espionage, sabotage, and reconnaissance in occupied Europe against the Axis powers. SOE agents allied themselves with French Resistance groups and supplied them with weapons and equipment parachuted in from England.

Witherington was born in Paris to British parents. She parachuted into France in September 1943 as a courier for the SOE Stationer Network and, in May 1944, became head of the SOE Wrestler Network in the Indre region in central France. She was the only woman to lead an SOE network and associated resistance groups, called maquis, in France.

After the invasion of Normandy on 6 June 1944, Witherington's network, comprising about 2,000 maquisard fighters, was especially efficient in sabotaging railroads and telephone lines. The official historian of the SOE, M.R.D. Foot, characterized the Wrestler network as "highly successful" and Witherington herself as "incomparable." She was a recipient of the Order of the British Empire from the United Kingdom and the Legion of Honor and Croix de Guerre from France.

== Early life ==
Cecile Pearl Witherington was born and raised in France by British expatriate parents, and was a British subject. Her father had been born into money but drank most of it away, and Pearl often had to negotiate with his creditors to save them from destitution. She was employed at the British embassy in Paris and engaged to Henri Cornioley (1910–1999) when the Germans invaded France in May 1940. Her fiancé had joined the British army in February 1940, and she did not see him again for three and one-half years.

== Second World War ==
=== Courier for the SOE ===
Witherington escaped from occupied France with her mother and three sisters in December 1940. The family arrived in London in July 1941 where she found work with the Air Ministry, specifically the Women's Auxiliary Air Force. Determined to fight back against the German occupation of France, and wanting a more active role in the fight, she joined Britain's Special Operations Executive (SOE) on 8 June 1943. In training she emerged as the "best shot" the service had ever seen. Despite her prowess with firearms, she never carried a gun during her mission in France.

Pearl Winterington, a trained British courier, took over and ran an active maquis group of some two thousand men in Berry with gallantry and distinction after the Gestapo arrested her organiser. She was strongly recommended for an MC [Military Cross] for which women were held ineligible; and instead received a civil MBE, which she returned, observing that she had done nothing civil.

Given the code name "Marie", Witherington left England in a No. 138 Squadron RAF Halifax aircraft and parachuted into Vichy France on the night of 22/23 September 1943, landing near Tendu in Indre Department. There she joined Maurice Southgate, leader of the SOE Stationer Network and Jacqueline Nearne, Southgate's courier, and reunited with her fiancé. Over the next eight months, posing as a cosmetics saleswoman, Witherington also worked as a courier. The Stationer network covered a large area in central France and Witherington was effectively homeless, spending nights sleeping on trains as she traveled from one place to another delivering messages and undergoing frequent checks of her (false) identity cards by the Gestapo and French police. Rheumatism put her out of action for a few weeks.

An exhausted Jacqueline Nearne returned to Great Britain in April 1944 and the Gestapo arrested Southgate on 1 May 1944 and deported him to Buchenwald concentration camp. Witherington was fortunate not to be arrested with him. Witherington and Southgate's wireless operator, Amédée Maingard were with Southgate the day he was arrested, but Witherington said that Maingard was worn out and that he needed to take the afternoon off. While the two of them were picnicking, Southgate was arrested—survival as an SOE agent was often due to luck.

With Southgate a prisoner of the Germans, Witherington formed and became leader of a new SOE network, Wrestler, under the new code-name "Pauline", in the Valençay–Issoudun–Châteauroux triangle. She organised the network with the help of her fiancé, Henri Cornioley. Witherington did not attempt to issue orders to the maquis groups directly, but found a willing French colonel to do so. Witherington worked closely with the adjoining SOE Shipwright network, headed by her former colleague Amédée Maingard. Together, their networks caused more than 800 interruptions of railway lines in June 1944 focused on cutting the main railroad line between Paris and Bordeaux. Putting those lines out of operation hindered the German effort to transport men and material to the battle front in Normandy.

=== Attacked and attacking ===
On the morning of 11 June 1944, German soldiers attacked Witherington at the Les Souches château, her headquarters near the village of Dun-le-Poëlier. Only a few maquis and non-combatants were present when the Germans arrived. Under fire, Witherington hid the tin where she kept a large amount of money and fled to a wheat field where she hid until nightfall. Her fiancé, Henri Cornioley, also hiding in a wheat field, counted 56 truckloads of Germans participating in the operation. According to Witherington, the Germans didn't try to find the hidden maquis and the SOE agents, confining themselves to destroying the weapons they found in the chateau. The attack on Witherington's headquarters was part of a larger operation in which 32 maquis were killed.

The attack left Witherington in "a hopeless state—we had nothing left, no weapons and no radio." She bicycled to Saint-Viâtre to meet an SOE operative, Philippe de Vomécourt, nom de guerre "Saint Paul," and radioed London requesting resupply. On 24 June, three planes air-dropped supplies and Witherington was back in operation. The number of maquis in her region quickly ballooned to as many as 3,500 as the Normandy invasion emboldened young men to join the resistance. She and Cornioley divided the maquis into four subsections, each with its leader. SOE in Great Britain supported the maquis groups by parachuting 60 planeloads of arms and material to them. Witherington had long requested a military commander to help her and on 25 July Captain Francois Perdriset arrived to assist in the military operations of the maquis in Witherington's sector. She objected to characterizations of her work as "bang-bang-bang, she blew up trains." She said, "It's just not true. All I did was to visit and arm the resisters."

=== German surrender ===
In late August 1944, the four groups of maquis in Witherington's Wrestler network were ordered by French authorities, now asserting their control of the maquis as the Germans were being pushed out of France, to move to the Forest of Gatine near the town of Valençay. The objective was to stop the German army in southern France from linking up with German forces in northern France. Witherington opposed the movement, but nevertheless accompanied the Wrestler maquis. On 9–10 September, in a battle more than 19,000 German soldiers under the command of General Botho Elster were threatened by French maquis. Fearing retribution, Elster didn't want to surrender to the maquis, but instead to a "regular army" and negotiated a surrender with American General Robert C. Macon. The French maquis who had harassed the Germans were not invited to attend or participate in the surrender on 11 September at Issoudun or the formal surrender on 16 September at Beaugency bridge. "Thus," said historian Robert Gildea, "the most tangible contribution of the FFI (French Forces of the Interior) was not even registered." Witherington was furious. She said that after the surrender ceremony the Americans showered the German soldiers with "oranges, chocolate, the whole works. But that's an old story, you know, soldiers were welcoming other soldiers. We weren't soldiers."

Witherington was not alone in her fury. French men and women "who had next to nothing" looked on as the Americans distributed rations and luxuries to the Germans. American flags were torn down and outraged letters were published in local and national newspapers.

On 21 September 1944, Witherington and the British personnel under her command were ordered to return to the United Kingdom, their mission completed. She returned with an "extraordinary—and probably unique—breakdown of her expenditure in the field: amounting to several million francs, it listed in meticulous detail every expenditure, even including entries for purchases of cigarettes and razor blades."

== Honours ==
Pauline [Pearl Winterington] was the great creator of the North Indre Sector. Without any respite and with sang-froid and contempt for danger she and Jean [her fiancee] traveled around the various maquis...with extraordinary audacity.

— A colleague, Michel Mockers

After the war, Witherington was recommended for the Military Cross, but as a woman, she was ineligible and instead was offered a Member of the Order of the British Empire (MBE) in the Civil Division. Witherington rejected the medal with an icy note pointing out that "there was nothing remotely 'civil' about what I did. I didn't sit behind a desk all day". She accepted a military MBE and in 2004 was advanced to Commander of the Order of the British Empire (CBE) during Elizabeth II's state visit to France. She was also a recipient of the Legion of Honour, Croix de Guerre and Resistance Medal.

In April 2006, age 92, after a six-decade wait, Witherington was awarded her parachute wings, which she considered a greater honour than either the MBE or the CBE. She had completed three training parachute jumps, with the fourth operational. "But the chaps did four training jumps, and the fifth was operational – and you only got your wings after a total of five jumps", Witherington said. "So I was not entitled – and for 63 years I have been moaning to anybody who would listen because I thought it was an injustice."

== Private life ==
Witherington married Henri Cornioley in Kensington Register Office on 26 October 1944; they had a daughter, Claire. With the help of journalist Hervé Larroque, Witherington's autobiography, Pauline, was published in 1997 (ISBN 978-2-9513746-0-7). The interviews of Pauline were edited by Kathryn J. Atwood into a straight narrative in 2013 and published as Code Name Pauline: Memoirs of a World War II Special Agent. Much of her wartime service is also included in the book Behind Enemy Lines with the SAS.

After the war, Witherington worked for the World Bank. In 1991, she and her husband helped to establish the Valençay SOE Memorial commemorating 104 SOE agents who died in the line of duty. The couple retired near Valençay, one of the places she frequented during World War II.

Pearl Witherington Cornioley died on 24 February 2008, aged 93, in the Loire Valley of France.

== In popular culture ==
Her story has been cited as the inspiration for the Sebastian Faulks novel Charlotte Gray, which was made into a film of the same name starring Cate Blanchett in 2001, although Faulks denied this in an interview with The Guardian. In the same article, Witherington is quoted as having previously refuted any connection to the fictional Charlotte Gray: "There was a job to be done. I didn't put my life at risk just so I could be with Henri."

At the end of his novel Jackdaws, author Ken Follett included a quote about Witherington's accomplishments from M.R.D. Foot's book SOE in France. Author Carole Seymour-Jones wrote a biography, She Landed By Moonlight: The Story of Secret Agent Pearl Witherington: the 'real Charlotte Gray' (2013).
