= Julienne Aisner =

French World War II resistance agent

- Born: Julienne Marie Louise Simart; 30 December 1899; Anglure, France
- Died: 15 February 1947 (aged 47); Paris, France
- Relatives: Jean Besnard
- Military career
- Allegiance: France
- Branch: Special Operations Executive, French Resistance
- Service years: 1943-1944
- Nickname: JuJu
- Unit: "Farrier"
- Conflicts: World War II
- Awards: King's Commendation for Brave Conduct (UK)

Julienne Marie Louise Aisner (née Simart; 30 December 1899 – 15 February 1947), code named Clair, was an agent in France of the United Kingdom's clandestine Special Operations Executive (SOE) organization during World War II. The purpose of SOE was to conduct espionage, sabotage, and reconnaissance in countries occupied by the Axis powers, especially Nazi Germany. SOE agents allied themselves with resistance groups and supplied them with weapons and equipment parachuted in from England.

Aisner worked with the Farrier network (or circuit), which was associated with the ill-fated Prosper network of Francis Suttill. She was recruited by alleged double agent Henri Dericourt.

== Early life ==
Julienne Marie-Louise Simart was born in Anglure, near Troyes, France. Her father was a policeman. In 1924, she married Corporal M. Lauler of the USMC and the couple lived in Miami, Florida. They had one child, a son. Lauler died in an automobile wreck in 1927. In 1929 she and her son moved to Lebanon to join her parents, her father was working there. Later the family moved to Hanoi where she was an English teacher. She returned to France in 1931. She became a scriptwriter for a film company and married Robert Aisner in 1935. The couple lived in Auteuil, Yvelines and among their friends was pilot Henri Déricourt.

When World War II began in 1939, her husband was called into the army and captured, but escaped and made his way to the United States where he would work as a technical adviser on the film Casablanca. In 1940 Aisner sent her son to the United States to live with relatives. She divorced Aisner in 1941. In May and June 1941 she was imprisoned for two months for slapping a German officer who had made "inappropriate comments" to her. In November 1942, she moved to Paris and became romantically involved with a lawyer, Jean Besnard. She was described as "an exceedingly beautiful and attractive woman, small and full of energy."

== Special Operations Executive ==
Henri Déricourt, now working for SOE, showed up at Aisner's apartment in Paris in January 1943. He persuaded her to act as a courier for his network, called Farrier. The job of Dericourt was to find landing fields and arrange receptions or departures for SOE agents arriving by air. Aisner assisted in Déricourt's first operation, the reception of agents landing in two Westland Lysander aircraft which came down in a farm field near Poitiers on the night of 17–18 March 1943. Aisner's usual job was to find safe houses in Paris for arriving or departing SOE agents and also to produce or obtain false identity documents for them to use. Impressed with her work, Déricourt arranged for Aisner to go to England for SOE training, returning to France in a Lysander with female SOE operative Vera Leigh on the night of 14/15 May 1943. She was received on her return by fellow resister and her fiancé, Jean Besnard.

In summer 1943, the Prosper network was destroyed as the Germans infiltrated the network and arrested hundreds of people associated with the network, including it organiser (leader) Francis Suttill. Déricourt and Aisner were not arrested and continued air operations with a steady flow of agents coming to France and returning to England. In August 1943, Aisner, with SOE approval, bought a small restaurant in Paris called the Cafe Mas which was used as a center for messages and contacts with agents. In March 1944, Aisner and Besnard began to suspect that the Germans were following them, and Besnard was warned that he was going to be arrested. The couple and radio operator André Watt fled to Troyes and were evacuated to London on 6 April. Because of their association with Déricourt, accused of being a double agent for the Germans, they were "quarantined" for a time and their loyalties questioned. Besnard denounced SOE's treatment of Aisner, describing her as a courageous and efficient agent. He found work at the BBC and she was employed in the Cinema section of the Ministry of Information. In October 1944, following the liberation of France from German control, they were allowed to return to France.

== Marriage and death ==
On 27 April 1944, Aisner and Besnard were married in Marylebone Registry Office, London. Aisner died in Paris from cancer on 15 February 1947, aged 47.

== Awards ==
She was awarded the King's Commendation for Brave Conduct from the United Kingdom.

1939–1945 Star	France and Germany Star	War Medal with King's Commendation for Brave Conduct
