= Ginette Jullian =

- Jullian worked primarily in the Eure-et-Loir Department.
- Born: December 8, 1917; Montelier, France
- Died: August 4, 1962; Tahiti
- Military career
- Allegiance: France, United Kingdom
- Branch: Special Operations Executive
- Service years: 1943-1944
- Nickname: Adele
- Unit: Permit

Ginette Marie Hélène Jullian (8 December 1917, Montpellier, France – 4 August 1962, Tahiti), code named Adele, was an agent of the United Kingdom's clandestine Special Operations Executive (SOE) organization during World War II. The purpose of SOE was to conduct espionage, sabotage, and reconnaissance in occupied Europe against the Axis powers, especially Nazi Germany. SOE agents allied themselves with resistance groups and supplied them with weapons and equipment parachuted in from England.

Jullian was a wireless operator for the Permit network (or circuit) of SOE in France in 1944.

== Life ==
Jullian lived in Algeria as a child, married at age sixteen, and was later divorced. In 1940, after the German invasion, she fled France for England. In 1943, she failed a training course to be a pilot with the British Air Transport Auxiliary, but later joined the First Aid Nursing Yeomanry and trained for the Special Operations Executive, learning parachuting, security, and wireless operation. On 7 June 1944, the day after D-day, she parachuted into France near the village of Saint-Viâtre, Loir-et-Cher, with her colleague Gérard Dedieu. They arrived with the SOE networks in chaos. Jullian's wireless was confiscated by a French Resistance leader and many members of the resistance had been captured by the Germans or were in hiding. In late June, Dedieu and Jullian finally found a safe house in Chartres, obtained a wireless set and began operations, arranging for 450 CLE Canisters of arms and supplies to be air-dropped to the resistance fighters. After Chartres was liberated by the American army on 15 August, she worked with the Americans as a wireless operator, accompanying the army to Dijon which was liberated on 11 September. She returned to Britain on 22 September 1944.

Dedieu described Jullian as "very brave and never lost her nerve even when the SS arrived to search the house from which she was transmitting". SOE leader Maurice Buckmaster described her as "exceptionally courageous" and recommended her for the Order of the British Empire. Jullian married French Admiral Philippe de Scitivaux in August 1945. She had a son from her previous marriage. She died in a scuba diving accident in Tahiti on 4 August 1962.

She is remembered on the Tempsford Memorial in Tempsford, Bedfordshire, England, which was unveiled in 2013 and commemorates the women who flew into occupied Europe from the nearby RAF Tempsford.
