= Peggy Knight =

British female WWII courier (1920–2004)

Marguerite "Peggy" Knight
- Born: 19 April 1920; Paris, France
- Died: 2004 (aged 83–84)
- Military career
- Allegiance: United Kingdom, France
- Branch: Special Operations Executive, French Resistance
- Service years: 1944
- Rank: Field agent
- Nickname: Nicole
- Unit: SOE F Section, Donkeyman network
- Awards: MBE, Croix de Guerre, Medal of Freedom

Marguerite Diana Frances Knight (later Smith) MBE (19 April 1920 – 2004) was a member of the Women's Transport Service and in 1944 served with the United Kingdom's clandestine Special Operations Executive (SOE) during World War II. With the code name Nicole, she worked as a courier with the Donkeyman network (or circuit) in France. The purpose of SOE was to conduct espionage, sabotage, and reconnaissance in occupied Europe and Asia against the Axis powers, especially Nazi Germany. SOE agents allied themselves with resistance groups and supplied them with weapons and equipment parachuted in from England.

== Biography ==
=== Early years ===
Marguerite Knight, best known by her nickname "Peggy," was born 19 April 1920 in Paris, France, the daughter of Capt. Alfred Rex Knight and his wife, the former Charlotte Beatrice Mary Ditkowski. She worked as a shorthand typist for the Asea Electric Company of Walthamstow, a district northeast of London, England.

== Special Operations Executive ==
Owing to her mixed British-French parentage and upbringing in France, Knight was a nearly perfect speaker of the French language – so much so that one day early in the spring of 1944 leaders of the British intelligence organisation Special Operations Executive (SOE) overheard her speaking French in a café and immediately moved to recruit her into the organisation.

On 11 April 1944, Knight began attendance at the Students' Assessment Board of the SOE at Wanborough. She was rushed through a cursory two-week training course at Thame Park, Saltmarsh, during which she did only one practice parachute jump from a static balloon, rather than the customary three, before being sent behind enemy lines in Vichy France to establish herself as a secret British courier.

Under the code name "Nicole," Knight worked as a courier for the SOE's Donkeyman network. Following the Allied invasion of France at Normandy of June and July 1944, Knight crossed back and forth between battle lines several times, carrying intelligence messages and information. Knight also participated directly in an attack by the French resistance upon a German military convoy, firing her Sten submachine gun during the course of the operation.

Knight narrowly escaped capture and execution later in 1944 when she and a group of resistance fighters were betrayed by one of their number to the Nazis. Knight was one of about 30 fighters who managed to fight through a German encirclement. The man responsible for the betrayal, Roger Bardet, was later arrested, tried, and sentenced to death as a collaborator after the war. This sentence was commuted, however, and Bardet was ultimately released from prison in 1955.

Knight left the employment of the SOE in November 1944.

=== Awards ===
For her wartime activity Peggy Knight was later awarded high British, French, and American honours, including appointment as a member of The Most Excellent Order of the British Empire, the Croix de Guerre, and the Medal of Freedom.

Member of the Order of the British Empire	1939–1945 Star	France and Germany Star	War Medal
Croix de Guerre (France)		Medal of Freedom	

== See also ==
- SOE F Section networks
