= Jacques Poirier (secret agent) =

Jacques René Edouard Poirier (1922–2006), code named Nestor, was an agent of the clandestine British Special Operations Executive during World War II. The purpose of SOE was to conduct espionage, sabotage, and reconnaissance in countries occupied by Nazi Germany or other Axis powers. SOE agents allied themselves with resistance groups and supplied them with weapons and equipment parachuted in from England. Poirier was born in France. He joined the resistance to the German occoupation when only 18 years old. In 1943 he escaped France and was trained by SOE in Britain. He returned to France in 1944 as an SOE agent, working initially with the Author Network and later became the leader of the Digger Network. He advised and supplied the French resistance forces, called the maquis, who carried out sabotage missions in southern France to assist Allied forces during the liberation of France.

== Early life ==
Poirier was born 7 July 1922 in Neuilly-sur-Seine France, the son of Robert Poirier, a French air force pilot during World War I and later a race-car driver. Poirier was training to be a pilot when France was invaded by Nazi Germany in 1940. He and his family fled to the south of France to escape the invaders and, living in Cannes, became involved in the resistance to the German occupation. He came into contact with the Special Operations Executive (SOE) in 1942 when SOE agent Harry Peuleve, who had broken his leg when parachuted into France, sheltered with the family. In November 1942, Peuleve decided to return to England and Poirier accompanied him. The pair, with Peuleve still using a cane, made the difficult crossing on foot of the Pyrenees into Spain on 21–22 December. They were arrested and incarcerated in Spain. They were eventually released and made their way to British-controlled Gibraltar. From Gibraltar, Poirier flew to Britain and arrived safely in June 1943.

Poirier was described by author Max Hastings as "a "big, robust, handsome, compulsively adventurous twenty-two-year-old." (He was actually only twenty-one when he joined SOE.)

== SOE ==
In England, Poirier was recruited and trained by SOE. Although he spoke poor English, he adopted the English name "Jack Peters." Peleuve had returned to France to create a SOE network called Author in the Correze region. In January 1944, Poirier parachuted into France to join him. Author Andre Malraux was a member of the network. Poirier's jobs consisted of locating drop zones for arms parachuted into the resistance—called the maquis—and landing sites for clandestine flights, plus meeting with resistance leaders to plan and carry out sabotage and other missions. In April, however, Peleuve and several Author members were captured by the Germans. At the time Poirier was visiting his mother in a different region and by chance avoided being captured.

SOE instructed Poirier to form a new network called Digger. He established his headquarters in the hilltop Château de la Poujade near Urval in the Dordogne. Peter Lake, a British officer who became his second in command, and Ralph Beauclerk, a wireless operator, parachuted into France to join him. The three made an excellent team, called the farfelus (madcaps) by Malraux.

To protect his family still in France and to bolster his authority despite his youth, Poirier concealed his French identity, telling the French resistors that he was a British military officer. He was called "Captain Jack." His father worked for him as his intelligence officer, reporting to him on German activities. Nobody was aware until after France was liberated by the allies that his intelligence officer was also his father.

Poirier said of his work, "The weeks preceding the Allied landing [June 6, 1944] were exceedingly strenuous. I continued to criss-cross Dordogne and Corréze by car, keeping to the minor roads. I would visit a maquis detachment or supervise one of my nocturnal air drops...I took part in attacks on the enemy and sabotage operations, often simply to show my face, because the presence of an Allied representative helped to sustain the Resistance idea in the minds of young marquisards fresh from their home, friends and villages." He received more that eighty air drops of arms and equipment. He travelled via gazoegènes, the charcoal-fired vehicles common in France during WWII as gasoline was not available. German patrols and roadblocks made travel hazardous. He armed about 4,000 of the maquis. The Germans were nervous, anticipating an Allied invasion and aware that the resistance, the maquis, was both armed and growing in numbers. The maquis were divided between followers of Charles de Gaulle and communists and efforts to combine them had failed.

On 4 June 1944 Poirier received a coded message, "the giraffe has a long neck" signalling him that the Allied invasion of France was imminent. That was the signal for the maquis to "sabotage railway lines, destroy petrol dumps, and maximize disruption to the enemy's lines of communication." A major objective of the maquis, including Poirier's group, was to harass and delay the German 2nd SS Panzer Division Das Reich's progress northward to Normandy, the site of the invasion. Action of the Maquis combined with air strikes caused Das Reich to arrive in Normandy piecemeal, several days to three weeks behind schedule. In mid-August 1944, Poirier's maquis forced the surrender of the Germans in Brive-la-Gaillarde, the first city in France to be liberated solely by the maquis.

During the early days of the invasion on 10 June, as Das Reich proceeded northward, the leader of a neighboring maquis group sent SOE agent Violette Szabo to liaison with Poirier. She ran into a German roadblock enroute and was captured and later executed.

== After the war ==
He worked for an oil company in several different countries after his wartime service. He was married twice and had four children. He wrote a book, later published, for his grandchildren about his wartime experiences titled The Giraffe has a Long Neck (the content of his coded message described above). He became president of L'Amicale Action, a French club for former members of the SOE.

== Decorations ==
Poirier received the following awards for his wartime service:

UK	Distinguished Service Order
France	Légion d'honneur (Chevalier)
France	Croix de Guerre
France	Médaille de la Résistance
