= Amédée Maingard =

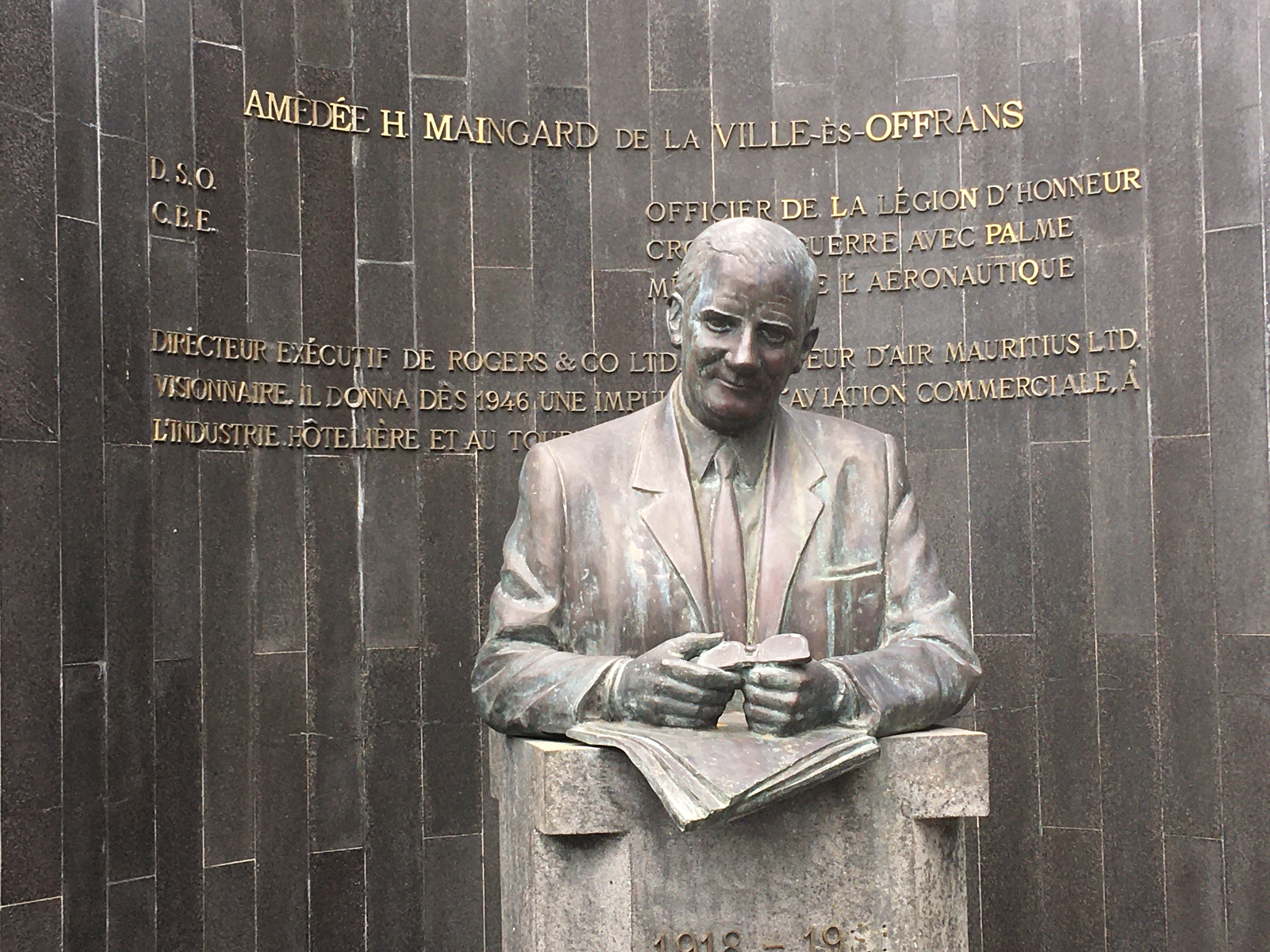
Statue of Amédée Maingard in Mauritius

Sir Louis Pierre Rene "Amédée" Maingard de la Ville-ès-Offrans, CBE (21 October 1918 - 1981) was born in British Mauritius. During the Second World War, he served with distinction with the British clandestine organization, the Special Operations Executive, supporting the French resistance, and was decorated by the British and French governments. After the war he returned to Mauritius and became a successful businessman.

== Early life ==
Maingard was born in the suburb of Mont Roches within the town of Beau Bassin-Rose Hill in British Mauritius. After completing his secondary school education at Royal College Curepipe, he travelled to London in 1938 to further his education. He planned to study to become a Chartered accountant.

== Wartime career ==
Within a year of landing in London as a student, World War II broke out in 1939 and Maingard soon volunteered for the British Army. After an unrewarding period in the infantry, Maingard joined the Special Operations Executive F section in 1942. He was parachuted into occupied France in April 1943 to join the 'Stationer' circuit run by Squadron Leader Maurice Southgate, initially as radio operator but soon was second-in-command in the circuit, arranging the delivery of weapons, supplies and personnel to the maquisards of the French Resistance.

Southgate was arrested by the Gestapo in May 1944 and sent to the Buchenwald concentration camp. Maingard was fortunate not to be arrested with him. Southgate's courier, Pearl Witherington and Maingard were with Southgate the day he was arrested, but Witherington said that Maingard was worn out and that he needed to take the afternoon off. While the two of them were picnicking, Southgate was arrested.

Maingard was promoted to the rank of Major and, together with Witherington, split the large Stationer circuit into two smaller circuits. Maingard's circuit was named 'Shipwright.' He expanded its size and scope of operations, operating between Poitiers and Montluçon. The official historian of the SOE, M.R.D. Foot, usually sparing in praise, characterized Shipwright as "highly successful." The circuit was especially active in the sabotage that took place on and after D-Day (6 June 1944), supporting the Forces Françaises de l'Intérieur and the arrival of fifty-five men of 1st SAS Regiment for the ill-fated Operation Bulbasket shortly after D-Day.

He continued his work until the liberation of central France, managing to keep the peace among the Gaullists, Communists, British and Americans fighting for the French common cause. He earned the Croix de Guerre from the French government in 1944 and the Distinguished Service Order from the British government in June 1945.

== Business career ==
At the end of the Second World War, both Amédée and his brother René returned to Mauritius and took up jobs at Rogers & Company Limited and helped develop the island's budding tourism industry. They helped to secure contracts for Rogers & Co. to represent Air France from 1945. In 1952 Amédée Maingard collaborated with Michel Pitot to transform an old colonial residence in Curepipe called the Mallac Castle into The Park Hotel, the island's first tourist hotel. He also contributed to the formation of Air Mauritius in 1967.

== Recognition ==
Maingard was knighted on 31 December 1981 in the 1982 New Years Honours List.

The Amédée Maingard de la Ville-es-Offrans Foundation Act (Act 8 of 1992) was enacted in Mauritian law to establish and regulate the Foundation in Maingard's honour. The Foundation's main objective is to provide Mauritian citizens, who have been selected by the Board, with ﬁnancial grants towards the costs of studies in air transport or tourism.

In 2007 a book titled Behind Enemy Lines With the SAS: The Story of Amedee Maingard, SOE Agent and written by British author Paul McCue was published by Pen & Sword Military. The book is Amédée Maingard's detailed biography as a young soldier in Europe during the Second World War.

At the International Airport of Mauritius, The Amédée Maingard Lounge is named in his honor.

== Death ==
Maingard died in 1981 at the age of 63, just before a boom in the tourist industry that he had helped establish.
