= Eileen Nearne =

British SOE agent (1921-2010)

- Nearne, c. 1940
- Born: 16 March 1921; London, England, UK
- Died: Before 2 September 2010 (aged 89); Torquay, England
- Relatives: Jacqueline Nearne (sister), Francis and Frederick Nearne (brothers)
- Military career
- Allegiance: United Kingdom, France
- Branch: Special Operations Executive; First Aid Nursing Yeomanry
- Service years: 1943–45
- Nickname: Rose
- Unit: Wizard

Eileen Mary "Didi" Nearne MBE, Croix de Guerre (15 March 1921 – 2 September 2010 (date body found)) was a member of the UK's Special Operations Executive (SOE) in France during World War II. The purpose of SOE was to conduct espionage, sabotage, and reconnaissance in countries occupied by Nazi Germany and other Axis powers. SOE agents allied themselves with resistance groups and supplied them with weapons and equipment parachuted in from England.

Nearne served as a radio operator under the codename "Rose." (French Resistance operative Andrée Peel was also known as Agent Rose.) She was captured by the Germans and imprisoned in Ravensbrück concentration camp, but survived the war.

== Early life and career ==
Born in 1921 in London to an English father, John Nearne, and Spanish mother, Marie de Plazoala, she was the youngest of four children. Her elder sister, Jacqueline Nearne, and one of her two brothers, Francis, would also become SOE operatives.

In 1923, the family moved to France, where Nearne became fluent in French. After the German invasion in 1940, the two young women made their way to London via Barcelona, Madrid, Lisbon, Gibraltar and Glasgow, while the rest of the family remained in Grenoble. On her arrival in England she was offered service in the WAAF working on barrage balloons, but turned this down and was recruited by the SOE. Enrolled into the First Aid Nursing Yeomanry FANY, Nearne worked as a home-based signals operator, receiving secret messages from agents in the field, usually written with invisible ink on the back of typewritten letters. Her sister Jacqueline was sent to France to work as a courier. The sisters were supposed to keep their roles secret from one another, but were unsuccessful.

She was flown by a Westland Lysander aircraft to a field near Les Lagnys, Saint-Valentin in Indre, France, in the late hours of 2 March and the early hours of 3 March 1944 with Jean Savy to work as a wireless operator for the Wizard network as part of Operation Mitchel. Her cover story was that she was Mademoiselle du Tort (also using the aliases Jacqueline Duterte and Alice Wood). Using the code name "Rose", she was given the mission of helping Savy set up a network in Paris called "Wizard"; its aim, unlike the networks dedicated to sabotage, was to organise sources of finance for the Resistance. Nearne's role was to maintain a wireless link to London, and in the course of the next five months she transmitted 105 messages.

Savy had returned to London with important information about German V-1 flying bombs, leaving Nearne on her own. Although she did not know it at the time, the same aircraft which took Savy home also carried her sister, Jacqueline, who had just completed 15 months in the field. Nearne then worked for the "Spiritualist" network.

She was arrested on 25 July 1944 after her transmitter was detected. She had gone to her safe house to transmit an urgent message against her chief's orders. As she was finishing she heard banging from the house next door so packed up and hid her equipment and destroyed her messages. When she heard thumping on her door she opened it and was confronted by a man pointing a pistol at her face. The house was searched and her radio gear and gun were discovered so she was arrested, handcuffed and driven to Paris. Nearne "survived, in silence, the full revolting treatment of the baignoire" in the torture chamber of the Paris headquarters of the Gestapo on the Rue des Saussaies.

She reportedly managed to convince her captors, under torture, that she had been sending messages for a businessman, unaware that he was British. On 15 August 1944, she was sent to Ravensbrück concentration camp where she refused to do prison work. Her head was shaved and she was told she would be shot if she continued to refuse. She was then transferred to a forced-labour camp in Silesia. While in one of these prisons she was reportedly tortured.

On 13 April 1945 she escaped with two French girls from a work gang by hiding in the forest, later travelling through Markkleeberg, where they were arrested by the S.S. but released after fooling their captors and reportedly hidden by a priest in Leipzig until the arrival of United States troops.

== Awards and honours ==
After World War II, she was awarded the Croix de Guerre by the French government. On 19 February 1946 she was appointed a Member of the Order of the British Empire (MBE) by King George VI for "services in France during the enemy occupation".

After the war Nearne lived in London with her sister, Jacqueline, where, The New York Times reported, she suffered from "psychological problems brought on by her wartime service". After her sister's death in 1982, she moved to Torquay and lived there quietly. In 1993 she travelled to Ravensbruck with fellow SOE agents, members of the Special Forces Club, the FANY and the WAAF to dedicate a plaque to the four agents executed there in 1945. Nearne talked about her wartime activities on a Timewatch television documentary in 1997, but she wore a wig, and spoke in French under her codename "Rose", and her wartime activities were not generally known.

She died alone from a heart attack in her seaside flat. Her body is thought to have remained undiscovered for some time until found on 2 September 2010; she was 89 years old. It was only when her flat was being searched by council workers to try to establish her next of kin that medals and other papers related to her war service were found.

Her next of kin, a niece, was located living in Italy and has said she was upset that Nearne had been portrayed as being "alone or unloved", adding, "Although I don't live in the UK, I was very close to Aunt Eileen and visited her often. I only saw her six months ago. She was always cherished by the family."

Nearne's funeral, which was provided free of charge by the Torbay & District Funeral Service of Torquay, was held on 21 September 2010 at Our Lady Help of Christians and St Denis Roman Catholic Church, Torquay. The eulogy was made by Adrian Stones, Chairman of the Special Forces Club. Her body was cremated, and her ashes scattered at sea, according to her wishes. Nearne died intestate and her estate of around £13,000 went to her niece in Tuscany, Italy, according to BBC One's programme Heir Hunters; series 6, episode 1.
