= Harry Peulevé =

British espionage agent

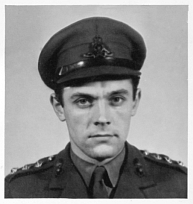
- In captain's uniform after joining SOE (1942).
- Born: 29 January 1916; Hastings, England
- Died: 16 March 1963 (aged 47); Seville, Spain
- Military career
- Allegiance: Britain
- Branch: British Army; Special Operations Executive
- Service years: 1939–1946
- Rank: Major
- Units: 82nd (Essex) Heavy Anti-Aircraft Regiment, Royal Army Ordnance Corps, SOE, REME
- Conflicts: Second World War
- Awards: Legion of Honour Croix de Guerre Medaille de la Resistance Distinguished Service Order Military Cross

Henri Leonard Thomas Peulevé DSO MC (29 January 1916 – 18 March 1963) was a Special Operations Executive agent who undertook two missions in occupied France and escaped from Buchenwald concentration camp.

== Early life ==
Peulevé, son of Leonard and Eva Peulevé, was born in the East Preston district of Hastings on 29 January 1916. His early childhood was spent in Algiers and later at Stratford-upon-Avon, Winchelsea and Fairlight, attending King Edward VI School, Stratford-upon-Avon and Rye Grammar School. In 1929 the family moved to Dinard on the Brittany coast, where Leonard found work as a travel agent. At the invitation of a family friend, Henri also spent time on the Côte d'Azur, during which time he became a fluent French speaker. Following his return to England in 1932, he qualified as an electrical engineer, working for Pye Radio and the Baird Television Company before joining the BBC in 1936. He became one of their first camera operators at the Alexandra Palace studios, where he worked until the outbreak of war.

== Military service ==
Peulevé enlisted with the 82nd Essex Anti-Aircraft Regiment in September 1939, but was soon transferred to the Royal Army Ordnance Corps and the Royal Military College of Science, where he was trained on gun laying radar. Promoted to Armament Staff Sergeant, he was sent to join an AA battery with the British Expeditionary Force at Arras in early 1940, but was evacuated in May as German forces approached. He eventually reached Nantes from where he and his men were evacuated, but the traumatic scenes he witnessed during the rout left Peulevé with a profound sense of humiliation, which spurred him to offer his services to the War Office. In March 1942 he was interviewed by Major Lewis Gielgud and accepted for training with the French Section of the Special Operations Executive, a secret organisation formed in 1940 to encourage resistance and sabotage in occupied countries.

=== Training ===
Peulevé's training group contained some of F Section's most celebrated names, including Francis Suttill, Claude de Baissac and Roger Landes. Preliminary training took place at Wanborough Manor, one of SOE's Special Training Schools known as STS 5, followed by a paramilitary course at Meoble Lodge (STS 23) in the Western Highlands and a few days at Ringway parachute school (STS 51) near Manchester. Peulevé then went on to train as a wireless operator at Thame Park (STS 52) in Oxfordshire in June, before attending the 'finishing school' for agents at the Beaulieu estate in Hampshire.

=== First mission ===
Peulevé and Claude de Baissac were selected to begin the SCIENTIST circuit, in the Bordeaux area. Both men parachuted 'blind' (without a reception committee) to a landing ground west of Nîmes at the end of July 1942, but were dropped too low: de Baissac sprained an ankle, and Peulevé suffered a compound fracture of the right leg. Peulevé was taken to a clinic in Nîmes run by Franciscan nuns, and in mid-September he was transferred to a villa owned by the Audouard family in Cannes. Georges Audouard was a member of a circuit of croupiers with links to CARTE, the major resistance network on the Riviera, run by a painter named André Girard based in Antibes.

Peulevé was introduced to Peter Churchill, an F Section agent acting as a CARTE liaison officer and responsible for the SPINDLE circuit. In desperate need of wireless operators, Peulevé was soon put to work transmitting for Girard, along with Isidore Newman, who had been brought ashore at Antibes in April 1942. Moving continually between safe houses in Cannes and Antibes, Peulevé was able to stay for a time with the family of a young French assistant living at Beaulieu-sur-Mer, Jacques Poirier. Unimpressed with Girard's lack of security and Churchill's lack of direction, Peulevé decided to leave for Spain in late November, taking Poirier with him.

Despite problems with finding reliable guides, Peulevé and Poirier left the border town of Céret to cross the Pyrenees on the night 21/22 December, a remarkable feat considering that Peulevé was still unable to walk without the aid of sticks. Unable to produce relevant papers, they were arrested the next morning by Spanish police and were sent to Figueras prison, where they remained until being removed to a camp at Jaraba in February 1943. On 11 April Peulevé escaped during a hospital visit to Zaragoza, and made his way to the British embassy in Madrid. He arrived in the United Kingdom three weeks later.

=== Second mission ===
Through a mutual friend, Peulevé met Violette Szabo, a young widow from south London. They formed a close relationship through the summer, but Peulevé was expected to return to France on a second mission to organise a new circuit, AUTHOR, supplying and training maquis guerrillas in the rural Corrèze region of west central France. Through her contact with Peulevé, Szabó would also become an SOE agent, being sent to Rouen in April 1944 to assess the state of the SALESMAN circuit.

Peulevé left for France on the night of 17/18 September with three other agents: Yolande Beekman, Harry Despaigne and Henri Derringer. Flying from RAF Tangmere in two Westland Lysander aircraft, they were received by Henri Déricourt at a field near Angers, who arranged for their onward journey to Paris. Henri Dericourt was subsequently confirmed as a traitor, who betrayed many SOE officers to the Gestapo, and many of the agents were tortured and killed. On 19 September, Peulevé's contact André Grandclément was arrested by the Gestapo, which left Peulevé with the choice to return to London or find his own way into the Corrèze. He chose the latter, and was passed via Grandclément's associate Marc O'Neill down to the SCIENTIST circuit in Bordeaux, now led by Roger Landes. Peulevé arrived in the Corrèze in early October.

Peulevé set up his network in the town of Brive-la-Gaillarde, helped by Maurice Arnouil, an engineer and local businessman who owned premises at 26, Avenue de la Gare. Arnouil was able to put him in contact with others who would form the staff of his circuit: former policeman Louis Delsanti, wireless operator Louis Bertheau, and mill owners Paul and Georgette Lachaud. Writer André Malraux also offered help, and suggested Raymond Maréchal, who had fought with Malraux during the Spanish Civil War. Maréchal would personally lead Peulevé's own guerrilla force.

In January 1944 Peulevé began receiving supply drops from RAF aircraft, enabling him to arm numerous maquis of the Armée Secrète and communists across the Corrèze and Dordogne. On 7/8 January he also received organiser George Hiller and wireless operator Cyril Watney, agents of a new circuit, FOOTMAN, in the Lot. Having trained as an SOE agent, Jacques Poirier was parachuted into France on 28/29 January as Peulevé's assistant, and began work on expanding AUTHOR into the eastern Dordogne.

=== Captivity and escape ===
AUTHOR successfully trained and armed more than 4000 resistance fighters before Peulevé was arrested at Bertheau's safe house on 21 March 1944, along with Bertheau, Delsanti and Roland Malraux, André's half-brother who had previously assisted the SALESMAN circuit in Rouen. All were taken first to Tulle, then Limoges and Paris, where Peulevé was separated and interrogated by the Sicherheitsdienst at their headquarters on Avenue Foch. Refusing to co-operate, Peulevé was tortured for several days before being transferred to solitary confinement at Fresnes prison. He later made an escape attempt but was wounded in the thigh, and forced to remove the bullet himself using a spoon. Poirier, having evaded capture, became leader of a replacement circuit in the Corrèze named DIGGER, assisted by agents Peter Lake and Ralph Beauclerk. As a result of their efforts, Brive-la-Gaillarde would become the first town in France to be liberated by resistance forces, on 15 August 1944.

On 8 August, Peulevé and thirty-six other agents were transported to Gare de L'Est and put aboard a train travelling east. On the following day it was attacked by Allied aircraft, during which time three women agents were able to pass water to the confined men, one of them being Szabo (she had been captured on her second mission whilst attempting to make contact with Poirier in the Corrèze). The prisoners were driven to Verdun, then on to a transit camp at Saarbrücken on the German border.

Four days later all thirty-seven agents were transported to Buchenwald concentration camp near Weimar, where they met four F Section men, Christopher Burney, Maurice Pertschuk and brothers Henry and Alfred Newton. On 9 September sixteen of the group were called to the main gate, and were hanged in the crematorium basement shortly afterwards. It became clear that the remainder would probably also be executed, and a desperate escape plan was hatched in collaboration with Eugen Kogon, secretary to one of the SS camp doctors, Dr Erwin Ding-Schuler. In return for signed testimony stating that Allied prisoners had received his help, Ding-Schuler agreed for three men to be hidden in Block 46, where human guinea pigs were used to conduct experiments on new typhus vaccines. Peulevé, Squadron Leader Forest Yeo-Thomas, and Stéphane Hessel, a French BCRA agent, were selected as those to be saved because they could all speak fluent French and therefore, the plan had a greater chance of success.

On 5 October, another eleven agents were called and executed by firing squad. On 9 October, Peulevé swapped identities with a dead French typhus victim named Marcel Seigneur; Yeo-Thomas and Hessel adopted the French names of Maurice Choquet and Michel Boitel later that month. Peulevé and Hessel were quickly transferred to a satellite camp at Schönebeck, and Yeo-Thomas to Gleina a week afterwards.

Hessel was transferred again to a camp at Rottleberode near Nordhausen, but Peulevé remained working in the Junkers factory at Schönebeck. In early 1945 he was moved to a punishment detail, sent to work digging anti-tank traps near Barby on the River Elbe. As American forces reached the nearby city of Magdeburg on 11 April, Peulevé was able to escape from his working party, but as he neared the Allied lines he was stopped by two SS officers. Enquiring who he was, he replied that he was a French collaborator trying to avoid capture, and suggested that they should change out of their uniforms. As they began to undress, Peulevé grabbed one of their pistols and later handed them over to troops of the 83rd US Infantry Division. After debriefing, Peulevé returned to England, landing at Croydon Airport on 18 April.

== Post-War life ==
Having been promoted to the rank of major on his return (now serving as a REME officer), Peulevé was demobilised in March 1946. Following several years working for Shell in South America, he was transferred to Tunis in 1952, where he married a Danish woman, Marie-Louise Jahn. They had two children, Madeleine and Jean-Pierre, before separating in 1956, following Peulevé's deportation from Egypt by President Nasser's government. He continued to work abroad, in Spain, the West Indies and later as a sales manager for the Handy Angle company in the early 1960s.

He died of a heart attack in Seville on 18 March 1963. He is buried in the British cemetery in the village of San Jéronimo, on the edge of the city.

== Decorations ==
Peulevé received the following awards for his wartime services:

UK	Distinguished Service Order
UK	Military Cross
France	Légion d'honneur (Chevalier)
France	Croix de Guerre
France	Médaille de la Résistance

== See also ==
- Phil Lamason
- Alfred Balachowsky

== Sources ==
- Foot, M.R.D, SOE in France: An Account of the Work of the British Special Operations Executive in France 1940–44 (Rev. Ed.), WHP/Frank Cass, 2004
- Foot, M.R.D, Six Faces of Courage, Pen & Sword, 2003
- Penaud, Guy André Malraux et la Résistance, Fanlac, 1986
- Perrin, Nigel, Spirit of Resistance: The Life of SOE Agent Harry Peulevé, Pen & Sword, 2008
- Poirier, Jacques, The Giraffe Has a Long Neck, Leo Cooper, 1995
