= Anthony Brooks =

British espionage agent (1922–2007)

- Born: 4 April 1922; Orsett, England
- Died: 19 April 2007 (aged 85); London, England
- Military career
- Allegiance: United Kingdom
- Branch: Special Operations Executive
- Service years: 1941–1945
- Rank: Major
- Unit: F Section
- Conflicts: World War II
- Awards: Distinguished Service Order; Military Cross; Croix de guerre Légion d'honneur

Anthony Morris Brooks DSO MC (4 April 1922 – 19 April 2007), code name Alphonse, was a British espionage agent with the Special Operations Executive (SOE) organization in France during World War II. The purpose of SOE was to conduct espionage, sabotage, and reconnaissance in countries occupied by Nazi Germany and other Axis powers. SOE agents allied themselves with French Resistance groups and supplied them with weapons and equipment parachuted in from England. Brooks received the Distinguished Service Order, Military Cross, Croix de guerre, and Légion d'honneur for his work as a leader of SOE's Pimento network sabotaging German reinforcements prior to and during the Normandy invasion. He later worked for the Foreign Office, and MI5 and MI6.

Of 470 SOE agents who worked in France during World War II, M.R.D. Foot, the official historian of the SOE, named Brooks as one of the half-dozen best male agents. Brooks is often characterized as the youngest SOE agent in France, but Sonya Butt was younger by several months when she arrived in France. In terms of length of time in France, however, Brooks was one of the longest serving SOE agents. He avoided capture by the Germans through strict adherence to security measures and survived the war.

== Parents and education ==
Brooks was born at Orsett, Essex. His father, Douglas, was a businessman who had been involved in intelligence work in the First World War. His parents separated when he was young, and his mother, Beryl, died when he was a teenager. He was educated at Chillon College on Lake Geneva and Felsted in Essex. He spent much of his youth with relatives in France and Switzerland.

== The escape line and escaping ==
When World War II began on 1 September 1939, Brooks, 17 years old, was visiting his uncle Norman Brooks' estate near Poligny, Jura in France. He applied to the British Embassy in Paris to join the Royal Air Force, but was turned down as too young. Working at his uncle's factory he felt more at home with the working class and the servants than he did in the luxurious surroundings of his uncle's estate. In June 1940 Nazi Germany invaded France and quickly overran the country and Brooks and his relatives joined millions of French people fleeing the Germans. After the armistice they returned to Poligny and Brooks joined his aunt Ruth in assisting stranded British soldiers and airmen to escape from France, now occupied or under the influence of the Germans. Brooks and his aunt sheltered the soldiers and on occasion accompanied them to Marseille where the Pat O'Leary Escape Line organized their escape by boat or foot to Spain and Gibraltar.

In 1941, Brook's status in France become dangerous as he was likely to be imprisoned as a British subject. In May he fled his uncle's estate and journeyed to Marseille where he briefly worked with Donald Caskie and the Pat O'Leary Line and led a group of escapees to Spain. The Spanish interned him at the Miranda de Ebro camp for several months. He was finally released through the efforts of British authorities and proceeded onward to England, arriving there on 12 October 1941.

Brook's clandestine activities while still a teen-ager, his wartime experiences in France and Spain, his affinity with the working classes, and his fluent French, enabling him to pass as a Frenchman, served him well in his later work with the SOE.

== SOE agent ==
Brooks was rejected by MI9 and the Secret Intelligence Service as "too young", but was recruited by the Special Operations Executive. He was commissioned as a second lieutenant on the General List (without Army pay and allowances) on 9 April 1942. Code named "Alfonse," Brooks was sent to France to aid SOE agent "Robert." The specific task given him was to develop resistance groups among members of labor unions. His network was called "Pimento." After training, he parachuted into France on 3 July 1942, landing at St Léonard-de-Noblat, near Limoges. Brooks refused to be armed because if discovered to possess a firearm (illegal in German-controlled France) his cover story of being an average French citizen would be endangered. Brooks injured his knee and back on landing and might have been captured by French police if not for assistance by a French farmer.

After recuperating from his injuries, Brooks paid a brief visit to pioneering SOE agent Philippe de Vomécourt who had a chateau nearby and then continued on to Toulouse where he met "Robert" and was delighted to find that Robert was René Bertholet, a Swiss citizen and previous acquaintance. Before returning to Switzerland, Bertholet introduced him to resistance contacts in Lyon and Brooks also developed contacts in Montauban. SOE was impatient with Brooks' independence and instructed him to find landing fields for clandestine landings of aircraft and told him that a wireless operator was being sent to him. When the wireless operator, Marcus Bloom, finally arrived in November, Brooks, who had a well-ingrained sense of security, was appalled on meeting Bloom who was dressed like an Englishman, greeted him in English, and was smoking a pipe of aromatic tobacco unavailable in France. He sent Bloom away to join another SOE network. Bloom was captured by the Germans in 1943 and executed. Brooks would become one of SOE's longest serving agents and would survive World War II, as many SOE agents did not. Brooks, the "mild-mannered and likeable young man turned out to have qualities of imaginative audacity."

Later, Brooks also had problems with another agent sent him by SOE: Lise de Baissac. De Baissac, 38 years old compared to Brook's 22 years, was an experienced and competent agent. She was insulted to serve in the lowly position of Brooks' courier and alienated his socialist and communist contacts with her aristocratic aplomb. The two soon parted company by mutual consent. De Baissac joined her brother Claude and rendered valuable service in Normandy before and after the allied invasion of France on D-Day.

Brooks focused on organizing resistance to the Germans among "railwaymen, truck drivers, factory workers, and longshoremen." He constantly traveled, working around both Toulouse and Lyon. Reflecting his attention to security, he rented a safe house in Lyon that only he knew about. He did not want a wireless operator, vulnerable to German detection, but communicated with SOE headquarters through couriers to neutral Switzerland from where messages could be transmitted to England. Moreover, Brooks was frugal, operating an active SOE network on about 100,000 francs per month (about $36,000 in 2023 U.S. dollars), compared to the profligate spending of some other networks.

Brooks received his first of many parachute drops of arms and explosives from England on 23 November 1942 and began a campaign of sabotaging railroads and electric lines. One of his parachute drops was intercepted by the Germans and Brooks spent the night hiding in a tree while the Germans searched the ground for him.

In August 1943, SOE ordered Brooks to return to England. He was ill and under great strain. A number of his closest associates had been arrested by the Germans. He left France via clandestine flight on 19 August and stayed in England until 20 December. While in England, he married Hope Munday on 9 November. During his absence André Moch led Pimento.

=== D-day and beyond ===
Brooks flew back to France in a RAF Halifax aircraft of No. 138 Squadron on the night of 20/21 December with a new cover name and the task of stockpiling weapons and explosives for use before and during the expected American and British invasion of France which would occur on 6 June 1944. The expected invasion also stimulated a large increase in the number of French men and women willing and eager to work in the resistance. Pimento continued its sabotage of transportation and communication facilities to hinder German response to an invasion force. In April 1944, Brooks reported to SOE that he had armed 4,700 men around Toulouse and had another 2,100 men partially armed men in the Lyon region.

Brooks' priority before D-day was to inhibit the response of the 15,000 men and 1,400 vehicles of the 2nd SS Panzer Division Das Reich, stationed in Montaubon, to the invasion, wherever and whenever it might occur. The key to success was to disable the railroad flatcars which would be needed to transport German tanks quickly to the invasion site. Warned that the invasion was imminent, Pimento operatives sabotaged flatcars by putting an abrasive lubricant into their axles which froze their wheels after a few miles of travel. Historian Stephen Ambrose tells the story that some of the unguarded flatcars were sabotaged by a 16-year-old girl named Tetty, her boyfriend, her 14-year-old sister, and several of their friends.

The transport of Das Reich by railroad to the battlefield in Normandy would have taken three or four days. Instead, Das Reich proceeded northward by road toward the site of the allied invasion on June 7. Its piecemeal arrival at the Battle of Normandy was between 15 and 30 June and the division was not fully united until July 10.

In the three months following D-day, Brooks' forces carried out many attacks and sabotage operations, especially on the railroads. Brooks was wounded slightly when a grenade exploded near him in Lyon. Several of his closest associates were killed in clashes with the Germans. In July, Brooks was arrested in Lyon for the first and only time by the Germans. He was interrogated, but his cover story was convincing and he was released. On being released he exchanged "Heil Hitler" salutes with his captors.

Brooks was trapped in Lyon, still German-controlled, while the resistance groups he had aided fought the Germans—and among themselves. Brooks met with American forces advancing into Lyon on 2 September and celebrated the liberation of the city on 3 September with French soldiers. Shortly after the liberation, Brooks was hospitalized with an ulcer. On 25 September 1944 he returned to England, his hazardous service during war completed.

Brooks ended the war as a major, and was awarded the Distinguished Service Order, Military Cross, Croix de Guerre with bronze palm, and Légion d'honneur for his service.

== After the war ==
He worked for the Foreign Office after the end of the war, spending time in the British embassy in Paris. He joined the Secret Intelligence Service (MI6), serving in Sofia from 1947 to 1950, but refused a posting to Hanoi in 1952 and resigned. After spending time in France, he rejoined MI6 in 1956, and was sent to Suez. He also undertook counter-terrorist operations in Cyprus. He was later British Consul General in Geneva, working again with MI6 in Cold War counter-espionage. He later joined the Security Service (MI5) before retiring in 1977.

== Personal life ==
Brooks married twice, but had no children.

He died of stomach cancer in London, aged 85.

== External sources ==
- "Obituary "Anthony Brooks: SOE agent who sabotaged German army movements"". The Times. 22 May 2007.
