= Alfred Balachowsky =

French entomologist (1901–1983)

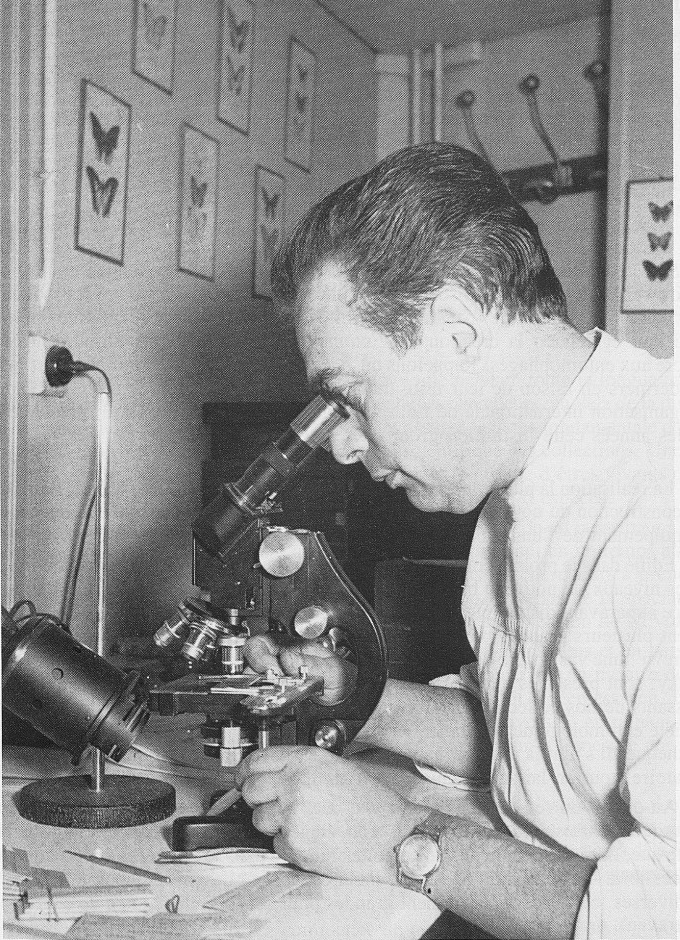
Alfred Serge Balachowsky

Alfred Serge Balachowsky (15 August 1901 – 24 December 1983) was a French entomologist born in Russia. He specialised in Coccoidea but also worked on Coleoptera. Balachowsky worked at the Muséum national d'histoire naturelle (MNHN). In 1948 he was elected president of the Société entomologique de France. From 1962 to 1974 he was chair of Entomology at MNHN.

Balachowsky was part of the Prosper Network in Paris during WWII, a spy network run by the British SOE. After the network was infiltrated and betrayed, Balachowsky was arrested and ultimately imprisoned at the Buchenwald Concentration Camp outside Weimar, Germany. Sent to Camp Dora on 1 February 1944, he was brought back to Buchenwald 1 May of the same year to work developing a vaccine for typhus. He also went to work helping the various underground groups inside the camp and established a network of contacts who fed him information from the camp's commanders. Along with Eugen Kogon, Balachowsky was instrumental in the survival of several British SOE officers who were among a group sent to Buchenwald for execution. Most of the group were murdered there, but several, most notably Edward Yeo-Thomas, Harry Peulevé and Free French agent Stéphane Hessel, escaped through the help of Balachowsky and his staff who exchanged them for the bodies of typhus patients in their test group. It is also believed that Balachowsky had a hand in getting 168 imprisoned Allied airmen including Phil Lamason out of Buchenwald and into the hands of the German Luftwaffe just days before they were to be executed.

After the war, Balachowsky testified at the Nuremberg Trials.

== See also ==
- Robert Benoist
- Christopher Burney

== Works ==
Partial list

- Étude biologique des coccidies du bassin occidental de la Méditerranée (1932). PhD. thesis

Books

- With Louis Mesnil Les insectes nuisibles aux plantes cultivées. Leurs moeurs. Leur destruction. Traité d’entomologie agricole concernant la France, la Corse, l’Afrique du Nord et les régions limitrophes. Tom 1. 1137 pp. Paris
- Faune de France, Volume 50: Coléoptères Scolytides 320 pages, 300 b/w line illus. (1949)
- Entomologie appliquée a l`agriculture. Traité. Tome I. Coléoptères. Maison et Cie Éditeurs, Paris, 1391 pp. (1963)

Articles

- D. Matile-Ferrero; A. S. Balachowsky (1972). "Contribution à l'étude de la faune des Coccoidea des îles Canaries avec description de deux espèces nouvelles [Hom.]" (PDF). Bulletin de la Société entomologique de France (in French). 77 (3): 106–116. doi:10.3406/BSEF.1972.21246. ISSN 0037-928X. Wikidata Q108825901.
- — (1928). "Contribution à l'étude des Coccides de l'Afrique Mineure (4e note). Nouvelle liste de Coccides nord-africains avec description d'espèces nouvelles" (PDF). Bulletin de la Société entomologique de France (in French). 33 (17): 273–279. doi:10.3406/BSEF.1928.28048. ISSN 0037-928X. Wikidata Q108835017.
- — (1929). "Contribution à l'étude des Coccides de France. (1re note). Faunule des Iles d'Hyères (Port-Cros et Levant)" (PDF). Bulletin de la Société entomologique de France (in French). 34 (20): 311–317. doi:10.3406/BSEF.1929.28224. ISSN 0037-928X. Wikidata Q108835137.
