= Roy Allen (pilot) =

American WWII pilot and Buchenwald concentration camp survivor (1918–1991)

- Born: August 1, 1918; Philadelphia, Pennsylvania
- Died: August 5, 1991 (aged 73); Sellersville, Pennsylvania

Roy Allen (August 1, 1918 – August 5, 1991) was an American, born in the north Philadelphia neighborhood of Olney. He was a bomber pilot during World War II, when he was shot down over France and sent to the Buchenwald concentration camp.

== France and captivity ==
On June 14, 1944, pilot Roy Allen and the crew of his Boeing B-17 Flying Fortress embarked on a mission over Nazi-occupied France. Hit by flak, Roy was forced to parachute into France.

Trapped behind enemy lines, he was rescued by Colette Florin, a 21-year-old schoolteacher and a member of the French Resistance. He stayed with Colette for six weeks until he was able to be moved into Paris. Once he arrived in Paris, a man told him that he was taking him to another agent who would then sneak him into Spain and then take him to England. The agent who was taking him to his supposed "British Agent", who went by the name Captain Jacques, betrayed him, turning him over to the Gestapo. He was then taken to Avenue Foch which was the Gestapo's headquarters for all of France at that time. At Avenue Foch, he was tortured, labelled a terrorist and deprived of his rights as a Prisoner of War under the terms of the Geneva Convention. He and other airmen were then taken to Fresnes Prison in the town of Fresnes, Val-de-Marne, seven miles south of Paris. As the front neared them, the Germans decided to ship Roy Allen and 167 other Allied airmen, including Phil Lamason, to the Buchenwald concentration camp in Germany. They left Fresnes, traveling by train in cattle cars. The cars were designed to hold up to 40 men. The Germans loaded them with 90, forcing their passengers to stand for the duration of the trip.

=== Buchenwald concentration camp ===
In Buchenwald, Allen suffered from extensive physical and psychological abuse. By the time he left, he weighed a mere 110 lb (50 kg), almost 80 lb (36 kg) lighter than when he left for his mission back on June 14. While there, he suffered from dysentery, pneumonia and various other illnesses. The harsh treatment endured by Allen and the other airmen at Buchenwald was a blatant violation of the Third Geneva Convention, which specifically prohibits the physical and mental abuse of captured service personnel, and states that they must be treated humanely. This explains the reason for the SS guards issuing the airmen with inmate uniforms with no serial numbers.

Later, Hannes Trautloft an officer from the Luftwaffe inspecting Allied bomb damage came across the Allied airmen. One of the prisoners, who spoke fluent German, highlighted their case to the officer. Sympathetic to their plight (and also aware that Luftwaffe POWs in Allied hands could suffer reprisals if he did not intervene), the German officer organized their transfer from Buchenwald to a legitimate prisoner-of-war camp, Stalag Luft III in what is now Poland.

== See also ==
- F. F. E. Yeo-Thomas
- Comet line
- KLB Club
- Alfred Balachowsky
