= Lise de Baissac =

Agent of the SOE (1905–2004)

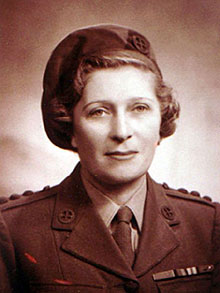
- In FANY uniform after joining SOE.
- Born: 11 May 1905; Curepipe, Mauritius
- Died: 29 March 2004 (aged 98); Marseille, France
- Relatives: Claude de Baissac (brother); Mary Katherine Herbert (sister-in-law)
- Military career
- Allegiance: United Kingdom, France
- Branch: Special Operations Executive, First Aid Nursing Yeomanry
- Service years: 1942–1944 (SOE/FANY)
- Nicknames: Odile, Irène, Marguerite, Adèle (SOE codenames)
- Unit: Scientist (SOE)
- Conflicts: Second World War

Lise Marie Jeanette de Baissac MBE CdeG (11 May 1905 – 29 March 2004), code names Odile and Marguerite, was a Mauritian agent in the United Kingdom's clandestine Special Operations Executive (SOE) organization in France during World War II. The purpose of SOE was to conduct espionage, sabotage, and reconnaissance in countries occupied by the Axis powers, especially Nazi Germany. SOE agents allied themselves with resistance groups and supplied them with weapons and equipment parachuted in from England.

De Baissac was one of the first SOE female agents to be parachuted into occupied France in September 1942. During her two missions to France she often worked with her brother Claude who headed the Scientist network of SOE. The two were most useful shortly before and after the D-Day invasion of France by the allies. The de Baissacs armed and organized French Resistance forces to hinder the German response to the invasion and to assist the allies. Lise de Baissac had frequent encounters with German soldiers in the heavily militarized region in which she worked, but she eluded capture. She was awarded several gallantry awards after the war.

== Early life ==
The only daughter among three children, Lise de Baissac was born in British Mauritius. Her father was Marie Louis Marc de Boucherville Baissac (1878–1945) and her mother was Marie Louise Jeanette Dupont. Her family were large landowners in Mauritius, but British subjects as all Mauritians then were. The family moved to Paris in 1919. When she was 17 years old she met her future husband, Gustave Villameur, a penniless artist. Her mother disapproved of the romance and sent de Baissac to Italy. Returning to Paris, de Baissac worked in an office although employment was unusual for an upper-class young woman at the time.

In 1940 Paris was occupied by the Germans. Her older brother, Jean de Baissac, joined the British Army. Lise and her younger brother, Claude, travelled to the Dordogne region in southern France in an attempt to reach England. She obtained help with travel arrangements to England from the American Consulate and crossed into Spain and went to Lisbon, where she and her brother waited for five months for permission to travel to Gibraltar and on to the UK. The pair arrived in Scotland in 1941 and she made her way to London. Through her family's ties with the wife of Gomer Berry, 1st Viscount Kemsley, she got a job at the Daily Sketch. Her brother Claude was recruited by the Special Operations Executive (SOE). Because of their proficiency in both English and French, Mauritians were often recruited as agents in France by the SOE. Fourteen would serve with the SOE during World War II.

== Special Operations Executive ==
As soon as the SOE began recruiting women, de Baissac applied to join. She was interviewed by Selwyn Jepson, and accepted for training in May 1942. She was described as "a mature woman of thirty-seven, small, slight, with black hair, light eyes, and a confident manner." She had the family characteristic of being "difficult but dedicated." Female SOE agents were trained as couriers or wireless operators and worked for male "organisers," but de Baissac was identified as having the ability to head her own network.

Her training took place at Beaulieu, Hampshire, where she trained with the second group of women recruited by the SOE including Mary Herbert, Odette Sansom and Jacqueline Nearne. She was commissioned in the First Aid Nursing Yeomanry in July 1942. The commandant at Beaulieu wrote that De Baissac was "quite imperturbable and would remain cool and collected in any situation... [s]he was very much ahead of her fellow students."

=== First mission ===
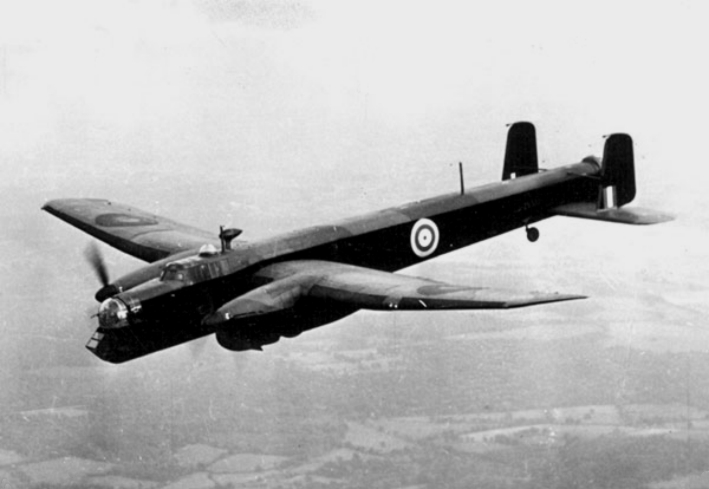
Armstrong Whitworth Whitley in flight c. 1940

On the night of 24 September 1942 (the night after their parachute drop was aborted due to the signals in the drop zone being incorrect), de Baissac ("Odile") and Andrée Borrel ("Denise") left England in a RAF Whitley and became the first female SOE agents to parachute into German-occupied France early on the morning of 25 September. (Yvonne Rudellat had arrived by boat two months earlier.) On the eve of her departure, she was taken for dinner by Colonel Maurice Buckmaster and seen off from RAF Tempsford in a Whitley bomber. Borrel was the first to drop, with de Baissac following, landing in Bois-Renard in the village of Saint-Laurent-Nouan. They were met by Resistance leader Pierre Culioli. Borrel departed for Paris to work for the Prosper network of Francis Suttill. De Baissac went to Poitiers.

De Baissac's role was as a courier and liaison officer for her brother Claude's Scientist network in Bordeaux, communicating with the Prosper (or Physician) network in Paris and with the Bricklayer network of fellow Mauritian France Antelme in Tours. Her mission was "to form a new circuit and to provide a centre where agents could go with complete security for material help and information on local details" and to organise the pick-up of arms drops from the UK to assist the French resistance. Her one-woman network was called "Artist." De Baissac used a number of code names (including "Odile", "Irene", "Marguerite" and "Adele"). Her cover story was that she was a poor widow from Paris, Madame Irene Brisse, seeking refuge from the tension of life and avoiding the food shortages of the capital. She moved into an apartment on a busy street near the Gestapo headquarters in Poitiers and often exchanged greetings with the Gestapo chief, Herr Grabowski.

De Baissac preferred the lonely life of working alone in Poitiers, making local contacts and recruiting resisters but avoiding the company of other SOE agents except when she chose to visit them on business in Paris or Bordeaux. She rarely saw her brother and she turned down an offer by SOE to send her a wireless operator, Gilbert Norman.

De Baissac reproduced in Poitiers what Virginia Hall had created in Lyon. During the 11 months she lived in Poitiers, she received and briefed 13 newly arrived SOE agents and organized departures of agents, resistance leaders, and others travelling clandestinely to England. She played the role of an amateur archaeologist which gave her the pretext of bicycling around the country to search for ancient monuments while, in fact, identifying possible parachute drop-zones and landing areas for the RAF's 138 and 161 squadrons. She collected air-dropped CLE Canisters containing weapons and supplies and transported them to safe houses. She also built a resistance network of her own, recruiting a number of "helpers" including a teenage girl who travelled with her as a cover for her activities. To communicate with London, as she had no wireless operator, she had to travel to Paris or Bordeaux where her brother Claude was organising sabotage missions and gathering information on ship and submarine movements. In June 1943, many members of the Prosper network were arrested by the Germans and her Artist network was also penetrated by the Gestapo, thereby increasing her risk of capture. On the night of 16/17 August 1943 Claude and Lise de Baissac, and SOE deputy head Nicholas Bodington, were flown back to England by Lysander. Roger Landes, the Scientist network's wireless operator, was furious that Claude had taken his sister with him to England, but not his pregnant lover and fellow SOE agent Mary Herbert who remained behind.

De Baissac was then sent to RAF Ringway where she was conducting officer (mentor) to two new agents, Yvonne Baseden and Violette Szabo. During their training, de Baissac broke her leg in a parachute jump.

=== Second mission ===
De Baissac's return to France was delayed until her broken leg healed. Not being able to parachute, she returned to France in a Lysander, landing in a farm field near Villers-les-Ormes on the night of 9/10 April 1944. She went to work as a courier for the Pimiento network, headed by Anthony Brooks, in Toulouse under the new codename Marguerite. However, de Baissac, ambitious for greater things, was given only trivial tasks. Her aristocratic demeanor was incompatible with the trade unionists and socialists who worked with Pimiento. She said darkly that the network was controlled by "someone in Switzerland", rather than SOE in London. By mutual consent, she left Pimiento to join her brother Claude, who had returned to France in February 1944, and the reborn Scientist network he headed which was now working in southern Normandy and adjacent areas. (Unknown to de Baissac and the French Resistance, Normandy would be the landing site of allied forces in the D-Day invasion of France on 6 June 1944.)

De Baissac was her brother's courier, bicycling 100 kilometres (62 miles) or more daily to deliver messages and attempting to restrain the now armed and impatient maquis (resistance fighters) from premature attacks on the Germans and the infrastructure which supported them. The job of Scientist was to reconnoiter possible large open areas where invading airborne troops could land and hold and to receive air-drops of weapons and supplies for the resistance.

De Baissac based herself in the village of Saint-Aubin-du-Désert, about 100 kilometres (62 miles) south of where British troops would land near Caen on D-Day. Still masquerading as a poor Paris widow, she rented the second floor of a house, consisting of two rooms with a mattress on the floor that served as a bed. On 5 June 1944 she was in Paris recruiting fighters for the resistance. That evening she heard the BBC broadcast the code phrase meaning that the allied invasion of France was imminent. Immediately she bicycled back to her network, traveling more than 300 kilometres (190 miles) in three days, passing through large formations of the German army and sleeping in ditches.

Arriving at her base near Normandy, de Baissac gathered information on German dispositions and passed it to the Allies. According to de Baissac, on one occasion, "the Germans arrived and threw me out of my room. I arrived to take my clothes and found they had opened up the parachute I had made into a sleeping bag and were sitting on it. Fortunately they had no idea what it was." On another occasion she shared a schoolhouse with German army officers, they working in the front room while she worked in a smaller room at the back. De Baissac's lofty aplomb served her well as she resisted successfully several attempts by German soldiers to confiscate her bicycle. On one occasion, de Baissac, accompanying a group of maquis, engaged in a firefight with a German patrol, reporting that they killed several Germans.

The two months after the Normandy invasion were frantic for the Scientist network. At night they gathered canisters full of weapons for the resistance fighters and impeded the arrival of German reinforcements by setting land mines or tyre busters in the roads. During the daytime de Baissac bicycled from place to place with an inexperienced wireless operator, Phyllis Latour, helping her with the communications necessary for arranging weapon drops and providing intelligence to the allied forces, now only a few miles distant.

On 25 July, the American army launched Operation Cobra which forced the German army to retreat rapidly from the Scientist area of operation. On 13 August, the de Baissacs linked up with a lead unit of U.S. soldiers. Dressed in long-unworn British military uniforms, they stood in front of the mayor's office in a provincial town and greeted the arriving American soldiers. A few days later the de Baissacs were flown to England, their mission concluded.

=== Hunting for Mary Herbert ===
In September 1944, the de Baissacs were back in France, now liberated from German occupation, as part of the Judex mission which aimed to locate lost and captured SOE agents and the French people who had worked with them. Claude was the father of a daughter, Claudine, born December 1943 to Mary Herbert, but he and SOE had lost contact with her. The de Baissacs traced Herbert from Bordeaux to Poitiers. They found her and her daughter in a house near Poitiers. The de Baissacs returned to England with them. Claude married Herbert, but it was apparently a marriage only of propriety as the couple did not live together.

== Post-war ==
After World War II, de Baissac worked for the BBC. In 1950, age 45, she married Gustave Villameur, her teenage sweetheart, who had become a successful artist and interior decorator living in Marseille; they had no children. Her husband died in 1978 and afterwards "she lived alone in a magnificent apartment overlooking the old port" of Marseille. The Guardian's obituary described her as a "grande dame of the old school: fiercely independent, courageous, elegant and modest." She died on 29 March 2004 in Marseille, aged 98.

In an interview, de Baissac said that "the loneliness of a secret life" was her strongest emotion and that "cold-blooded efficiency for long weary months" was needed more than heroism. In 2008, her life was recaptured in the highly fictionalised French film Female Agents (Les Femmes de l'ombre).

== Recognition ==
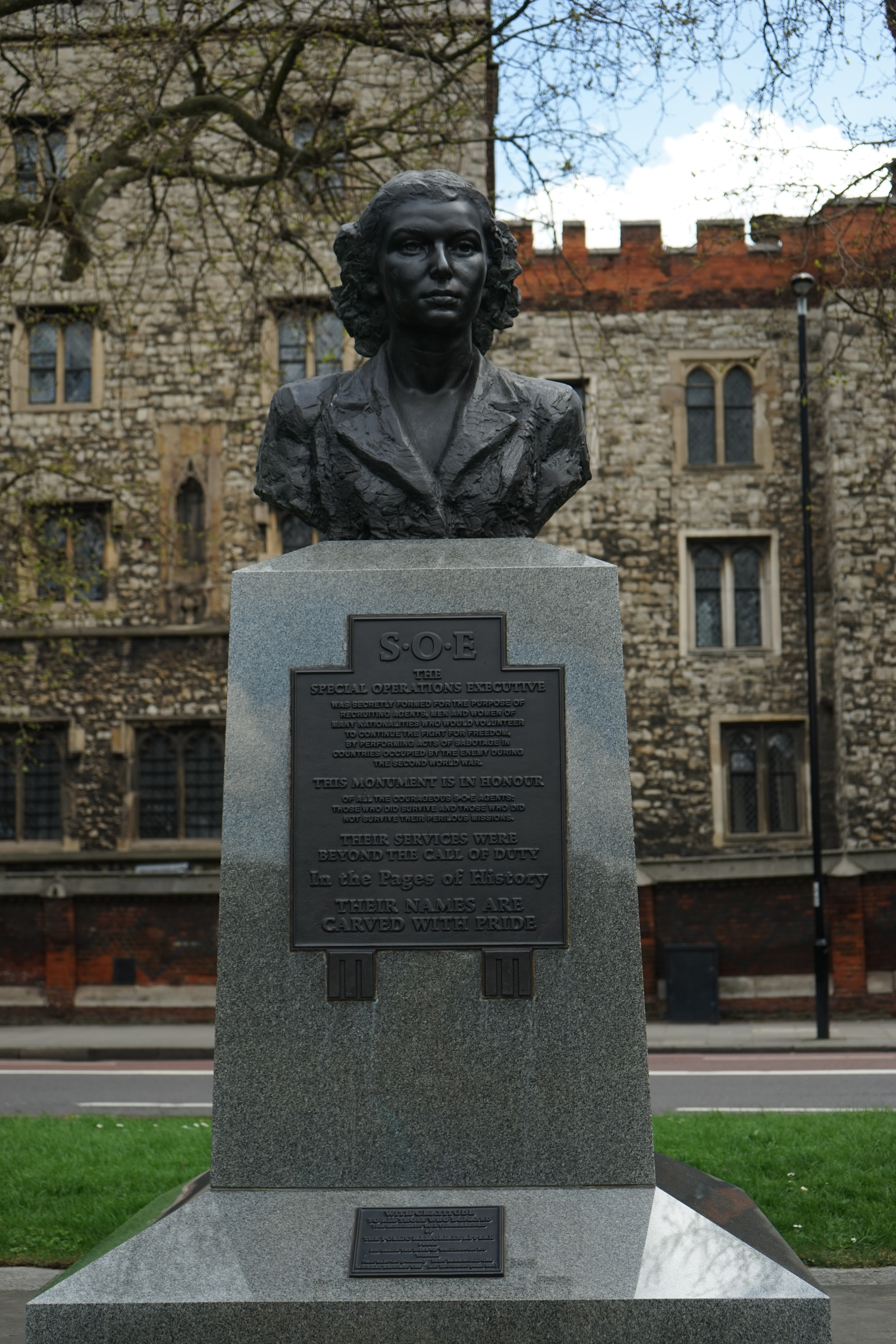
SOE Agents Memorial

Honours

- France: Knight of the Légion d'honneur (LH), Croix de Guerre 1939–1945 (CG) with palm;
- UK: Member of the Order of the British Empire (MBE), September 1945.

Citations

- One British officer declared: "The role she played in aiding the maquis and the resistance in France will never be over-praised and she did much to enable to maquis and resistance's preparations before the American breakthrough in Mayenne."
- Her SOE dossier states "[S]he was the inspiring-force for the groups in the Orne, and through her initiatives she inflicted heavy losses on the Germans thanks to anti-tyre devices scattered on the roads near Saint-Aubin-du-Désert, Saint-Mars-du-Désert, and even as far as Laval, Le Mans and Rennes. She also took part in armed attacks on enemy columns."

Order of the British Empire (Member)	1939–1945 Star	France and Germany Star	War Medal 1939–1945
Légion d'honneur (Chevalier)		Croix de Guerre (France)	

== Monument ==
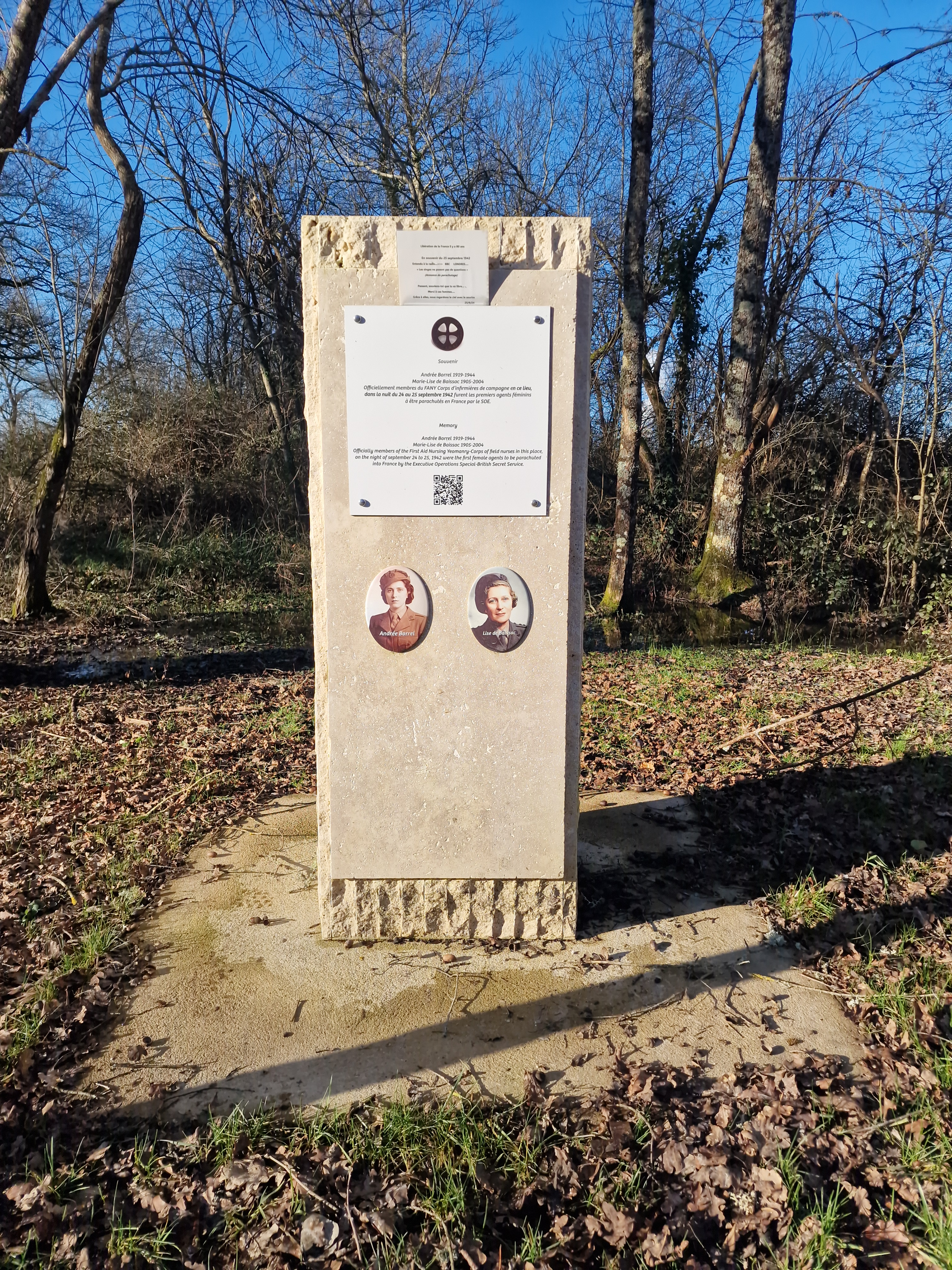
Monument erected in memory of Andrée Borrel and Marie-Lise de Baissac in the town of Saint-Laurent-Nouan (Loir-et-Cher) at a place called Bois-Renard, place of their parachute drop on the night of 24 to 25 September 1942. Inaugurated on September 25, 2022. GPS coordinates: 47.664599,1.600769.

A monument is erected in memory of Andrée Borrel and Marie-Lise de Baissac in the town of Saint-Laurent-Nouan (Loir-et-Cher) at a place called Bois-Renard, the place of their parachuting on the night of 24 to September 25, 1942. It was inaugurated on September 25, 2022. GPS coordinates: 47.664599,1.600769.
