= Jacques Desoubrie =

Belgian spy (1922–1949)

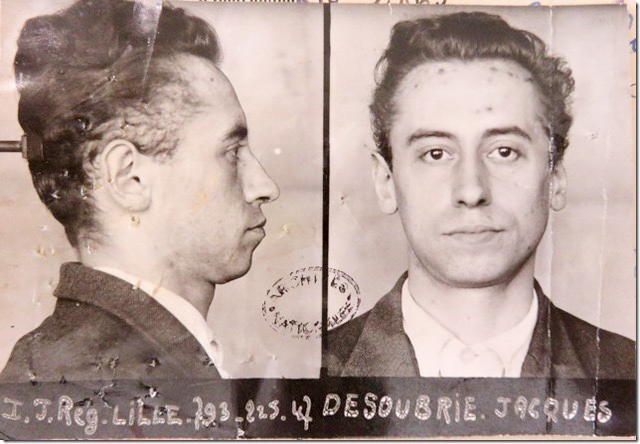
Jacques Desoubrie

Jacques Desoubrie (22 October 1922 – 20 December 1949) was a double agent who worked for the Gestapo during the German occupation of France and Belgium during World War II. He infiltrated resistance groups, such as the Comet Line, and was responsible for the arrest of several leaders and more than 100 members of organizations (called "lines" or "reseau"). The lines helped Allied airmen who had been shot down or crash-landed to evade German capture and escape occupied Europe. After the war he was tried, convicted, and executed in France.

== Early life ==
Desoubrie was born out-of-wedlock 22 October 1922 in Luingne (Mouscron), Belgium. His father was a Belgian doctor, Raymond Desoubrie and his mother, Zoe Note, abandoned him at an early age. He grew up with his father in Tourcoing, a French city on the border with Belgium. He trained to be an electrician.

Desoubrie was described as a short, stocky man with grey eyes who wore moderately thick-lensed glasses. He had gold fillings in his front teeth and he spoke fluent English. Unlike many collaborators working for the Germans whose primary motivation was money and privileges, Desoubrie was an enthusiastic supporter of the Nazis, although he was also well paid for his work.

Desoubrie had two children, Jacques (born c. 1941) and Adolph (b. 1943) by his mistress, Marie-Therese Laurent. He had a close relationship with another woman, Marie-Antoinette Orsini (code named "Colette"), who helped him escort Allied airmen from Brussels to Paris and may have been aware that he was working for the Germans.

== World War II ==
=== Initial activities ===
Desoubrie began work with the Gestapo in 1941. He infiltrated the Resistance group Vérité Française, where he was responsible for the arrest of 100 people, and then the Le Gualès network (after Charles Le Gualès de la Villeneuve, one of its leaders) where 50 people were arrested. He used various aliases including: Jacque Leman, Jean Masson, Pierre Boulain, and Captain Jacques, as he liked to be known.

=== The Comet Line ===
In 1943, Desoubrie infiltrated the Belgian and French escape network known as the Comet Line which helped Allied airmen shot down over Belgium. At great risk to themselves, the people working with the Comet Line exfiltrated the airmen from Belgium through France to neutral Spain from where they could be returned to the United Kingdom.

In 1941 and 1942, the Comet Line had been successful in exfiltrating downed Allied airmen, mostly British and American, out of occupied Belgium and through occupied France to neutral Spain. However, in November 1942, a large number of the Belgian helpers of the line were arrested and imprisoned by the Gestapo and in January 1943, the Comet Line's founder, Andrée de Jongh was captured by the Germans. Andrée's father, Frederic de Jongh, who had fled Brussels to Paris, was attempting to put the pieces of the Comet Line back together. A young Belgian who called himself Jean Masson had been successful in escorting airmen from Paris to Belgium. After winning de Jongh's trust, Masson, the name Desoubrie was using, requested that de Jongh and other Comet Line leaders meet him at a train station in Paris to receive six airmen he was escorting from Belgium. At the train station, Frederic De Jongh and several other Comet line leaders were arrested by French police and turned over to the Germans. Acting on Desoubrie's knowledge of the Comet Line, additional arrests decimated the Comet Line. Masson, however, was not generally known as the betrayer of the Comet Line—except by some of those who had disappeared into German prisons.

In January 1944, information provided by Desoubrie enabled the Gestapo to arrest the Comet Line's leader, Jean-Jacques Northomb (code named "Franco"), and British intelligence agent, Jacques Legrelle (code named "Jerome'). Desoubrie, now using the name Pierre Boulain, was finally unmasked in Paris on May 7, 1944, by Comet Line guide Michelle Dumon (code named "Lily" and "Michou"). In exposing Boulain, Dumon became vulnerable to the Gestapo and fled France.

MI9 agents Albert Ancia and Jean de Blommaert asked the Resistance group French Forces of the Interior (FFI) to assassinate Desoubrie. The FFI reported this done on May 22, 1944, but Desoubrie soon re-appeared, so either the FFI lied or the wrong man was killed.

=== Later activities ===
Desoubrie did not cease his activities after being identified as a German agent. Among the airmen later betrayed by Desoubrie was Roy Allen as well as Phil Lamason and his English navigator Ken Chapman. Lamason along with Chapman, was picked up by members of the French Resistance and hidden at various locations for seven weeks. In August 1944, while attempting to reach Spain, Lamason and Chapman were captured by the Gestapo in Paris after they were betrayed by Desoubrie for 10,000 francs each. Lamason, Chapmen, Allen and 165 more airmen were taken to Buchenwald concentration camp in August 1944.

Desoubrie or "Jean Masson" should not be confused with the Jean Masson (1910–1965) who participated in the creation of the traditionalist Catholic Cité catholique group, along with Jean Ousset, in 1946.

== Downfall ==
After the liberation of Paris, Desoubrie fled to Germany. The Allies attempted to track him down in order to prosecute him. Finding him became easier when Michelle Dumon, back in Paris, was asked by an American intelligence officer to look at two photos of a man. She identified the photos as the man she knew as Jean Masson. He had offered his services to the Allied forces. With Desoubrie identified, he was soon found and arrested, after being denounced by his ex-mistress, and executed by firing squad as a collaborationist on 20 December 1949 in the fort of Montrouge, in Arcueil, near Paris. (Some sources say he was executed in 1945.)

== See also ==
- Roy Allen
- KLB Club
- List of people involved with the French Resistance
