= Mary Katherine Herbert =

British Special Operations Executive agent

- Born: 1 October 1903; Ireland
- Died: 23 January 1983 (aged 79)
- Spouse: Claude de Baissac
- Relatives: Lisé de Baissac (sister-in-law)
- Military career
- Allegiance: United Kingdom, France
- Branch: Women's Auxiliary Air Force, Special Operations Executive, First Aid Nursing Yeomanry
- Service years: 1941 (WAAF) / 1942–1944 (SOE)
- Nickname: Claudine
- Unit: Scientist

Mary Katherine Herbert (also known as Maureen) (1 October 1903 – 23 January 1983), code named Claudine, was an agent of the United Kingdom's clandestine Special Operations Executive (SOE) organization during World War II in France. The purpose of SOE was to conduct espionage, sabotage, and reconnaissance in countries occupied by the Axis powers, especially Nazi Germany. SOE agents allied themselves with resistance groups and supplied them with weapons and equipment parachuted in from England.

Herbert was the only known female agent of SOE to have a baby while working in France during the war. The father was her organiser (leader), Claude de Baissac. The couple later married but never lived together.

== Early life ==
Herbert was born in Ireland, the daughter of Brigadier General Edmund Herbert. She had a university degree in art and spoke French, Spanish, Italian, German, and Arabic. At the outbreak of the war, Herbert was working in the British Embassy in Warsaw. Later she was a civilian translator in the Air Ministry in London. She joined the WAAF at RAF Innsworth on 19 September 1941 as a General Duties and Intelligence Clerk. She was released at her own request from the WAAF so she could join the SOE in March 1942. Herbert was the first WAAF officer to volunteer for the SOE. At 39 years of age, she was older than the average SOE female agent. She was tall and slender with fair hair, very religious, and had the virtue, in the view of SOE, of being inconspicuous.

== Special Operations Executive ==
Herbert trained as a courier with the second group of SOE women agents, including Odette Sansom, Jacqueline Nearne and Lise de Baissac. Following her training, she travelled by submarine from England to Gibraltar, and then by felucca, landing on the southern coast of France the night of 31 October 1942. She met with other SOE agents in Cannes and then proceeded onward by train to Bordeaux where she met with de Baissac, the leader of the Scientist network of SOE. Scientist was one of SOE's most promising networks, organizing and arming resistance groups and carrying out intelligence operations in a large area of southwestern France. As a courier Herbert traveled widely by bicycle and train, liaising with the different groups of the French Resistance, carrying messages, documents, money, and wireless parts, acting as a post-office box for the members of the network, and seeking out safe houses and potential recruits. On one occasion when she was struggling to carry a heavy wireless set in a suitcase, a chivalrous German officer carried it for her onto a train. During her travels, Herbert became friends with de Baissac's sister Lise who was an SOE agent in Poitiers.

In June 1943, the Germans penetrated the Prosper network in Paris and arrested many SOE agents and hundreds of their French contacts. As Scientist had links with Prosper, the Germans also dismantled Scientist, and the SOE agents, including Herbert, went into hiding. De Baissac requested or was ordered to return to England to avoid arrest and he and his sister, Lise, flew back on a Westland Lysander from a clandestine airfield on the night of 16/17 August. Herbert was pregnant by this time and Roger Landes, the Scientist network's efficient wireless operator, was furious that de Baissac had taken his sister with him to England and left Mary Herbert behind.

Herbert had hidden her pregnancy until she learned that de Baissac was not coming back to Bordeaux. She told Landes who ordered her to cease all clandestine activities and installed her in a nursing home in the suburbs of Bordeaux where she had a daughter she named Claudine in early December 1943. With her daughter she left the nursing home and moved into an apartment in Poitiers that Lise de Baissac had rented.

== Arrest ==
On 18 February 1944, Herbert was arrested in her apartment in Poitiers. The German Gestapo had found out that Lise de Baissac was an SOE agent and that the apartment had been rented to her. The Germans initially thought that Herbert was de Baissac. The Germans imprisoned Herbert, leaving the baby with her maid. French Social Services put the child in an orphanage. Under interrogation, Herbert kept to her cover story and denied that she knew de Baissac. Her accented French, she said, was because she had lived in Egypt and spoke Arabic. She protested her innocence saying she knew nothing of the woman who had rented the apartment before her, that she had only been there a few weeks, and it was hardly likely that an SOE agent would have just given birth to a baby.

In prison, Herbert was put into solitary confinement for 24 hours, but otherwise was not badly treated. The prison was "very clean and the inmates had a bath every Saturday." She was released at Easter and her belongings given back to her, except for a ring. She returned to the prison the next day and the ring was returned to her "with apologies." The hunt for her child was long, but she finally found her in the convent and persuaded the nuns that she had been arrested unfairly and the child was returned to her.

== Found ==
Herbert and her daughter, Claudine, moved to a country house near Poitiers. In September 1944, Claude and Lise de Baissac were back in France, now liberated from German control, as part of the Judex mission which aimed to locate lost and captured SOE agents and the French people who had helped them. SOE had lost all contact with Herbert. The de Baissac's traced Herbert from Bordeaux to Poitiers and found her and her daughter living in a farm house. They then returned to England with Herbert and Claudine. De Baissac married Herbert on 11 November 1944, but it was apparently a marriage only of propriety as the couple did not live together.

== Later life ==
De Baissac and Herbert were divorced in 1960. Herbert bought a small house in Frant, Sussex and gave French lessons for a living. Her daughter Claudine immigrated to the United States and married an airline pilot. Herbert died with her daughter at her side on 23 January 1983 of pneumonia.

== Honours and awards ==
Herbert was awarded the Croix de Guerre by France, but unlike many of her SOE colleagues, received no British award.

1939–1945 Star	France and Germany Star	War Medal	Croix de Guerre (France)

== Bibliography ==
- Liane Jones, A Quiet Courage: Women Agents in the French Resistance, London, Transworld Publishers Ltd, 1990. ISBN 0-593-01663-7
- Marucs Binney, The Women Who Lived for Danger: The Women Agents of SOE in the Second World War, London, Hodder and Stoughton, 2002. ISBN 0-340-81840-9
