= Phyllis Latour =

Special Operations Executive agent (1921–2023)

- Latour in undated photo
- Born: 8 April 1921; Durban, Natal, Union of South Africa
- Died: 7 October 2023 (aged 102); West Auckland, New Zealand
- Military career
- Allegiance: United Kingdom; France
- Branch: WAAF, Special Operations Executive, French Resistance
- Service years: 1941–1944
- Rank: Hon. Section Officer (WAAF)
- Nickname: Genevieve
- Commands: Scientist
- Awards: Member of the Order of the British Empire; 1939–1945 Star; France and Germany Star; Defence Medal (United Kingdom); War Medal 1939–1945; Croix de Guerre; Legion of Honour

Phyllis "Pippa" Latour MBE (8 April 1921 – 7 October 2023) was a South African-born agent of the United Kingdom's clandestine Special Operations Executive (SOE) organisation in France during World War II. The purpose of SOE was to conduct espionage, sabotage and reconnaissance in occupied Europe against the Axis powers, especially Nazi Germany. SOE agents in France allied themselves with French Resistance groups and supplied them with weapons and equipment parachuted in from England. Latour worked as a wireless operator in Normandy from 1 May 1944 until August in the same year.

== Early life and family ==
Latour's father, Philippe, was a French doctor and married to Louise, a British citizen living in South Africa, where Phyllis was born in April 1921. Her father died three months later during local conflicts in the French Equatorial Africa, and her mother remarried three years later. Her stepfather was a racing driver.

There are contradictory accounts of Phyllis' mother's death. According to some reports, Louise was driving one of her new husband's racing cars, which malfunctioned and she was killed when it crashed into a barrier. However, in her autobiography published in 2024 Latour describes this as "Poppycock. Absolute rubbish. An accident like that could have happened somewhere and sometime but not to my mother in 1925. I wish I could get this story off the internet." She says her mother died of a haemorrhage at a doctor's surgery. In any case Phyllis then went to live with her father's cousin in Jadotville in the Belgian Congo.

She was later sent to a boarding school in Kenya at age 16.

== WAAF and Special Operations Executive ==
Latour moved to England in May 1939, and joined the Women's Auxiliary Air Force (WAAF) in November 1941 (Service Number 718483) as a balloon operator. Because of her fluent French, however, she was immediately asked by SOE to become an agent, and went through vigorous mental and physical training. She joined the SOE in revenge for her godmother's father having been shot by the Nazis and for her godmother's suicide after being imprisoned, officially joining on 1 November 1943 and was commissioned as an Honorary Section Officer.

Latour parachuted into Orne, Normandy on 1 May 1944 to operate as part of the Scientist circuit, using the codename Genevieve to work as a wireless operator with the organiser Claude de Baissac and his sister Lise, his courier and assistant. The de Baissacs, among SOE's best agents, were "dedicated but difficult." Lise described Latour as 'very brave and very willing but a mess of a girl." Care was necessary as the de Baissacs were working in Normandy, soon to be the site of the Allied D-Day invasion of France. The area was heavily militarised by the Germans and the working environment dangerous.

Small of stature, Latour posed as a teenage girl whose family had moved to the region to escape the Allied bombing. She rode bicycles around the area, selling soap and chatting with German soldiers. She encoded and transmitted the de Baissacs' messages to SOE headquarters. She transmitted by using one-time codes printed on a piece of silk she concealed by wrapping it around a knitting needle that was inserted into a flat shoelace, which she used to tie up her hair, and would translate using Morse code equipment. She was searched on several occasions, and at one point was brought in for questioning, but the German authorities did not think to examine her hair tie and she was released. Latour's 135 coded messages helped guide bombing missions to enemy targets. She had several close shaves while in France. Once, as she typed out a transmission two German soldiers opened the door looking for food. Calmly she closed up the wireless set, pretending it was a case she was packing, while telling them she had scarlet fever – which had been sweeping the area – and said she had to get out of the village. The soldiers left quickly.

In early August, the American army reached the village where Latour was operating. Suspicious of her, they held her captive for five hours until she was recognised as an SOE agent. She soon returned to England, her mission completed.

== Post World War II ==
After World War II, Latour married an engineer with the surname Doyle, and went to live in Kenya, Fiji, and Australia. She later lived in Auckland, New Zealand, and turned one hundred years old in April 2021. She was the last living female SOE agent of the 39 who worked in France during World War II.

Latour did not discuss her wartime activities with her family until her children discovered them by reading about them on the Internet in 2000.

Phyllis Latour died on 7 October 2023, at the age of 102.

== Honours and awards ==
In September 1945, Latour was appointed an additional Member of the Order of the British Empire, for services in France during the German occupation. She was appointed a Chevalier of the Legion of Honour (Knight of the Legion of Honour), by the French government on 29 November 2014, as part of the 70th anniversary of the battle of Normandy.

| UK | Member of the Order of the British Empire (MBE) |
| UK | 1939–1945 Star |
| UK | France and Germany Star |
| UK | Defence Medal |
| UK | War Medal 1939–1945 |
| France | Croix de guerre 1939–1945 |
| France | Legion of Honour |

== Bibliography ==
- Latour, Pippa (2024). The Last Secret Agent. Auckland, NZ: Allen and Unwin. ISBN 978-1-99100-656-1.
- Squadron Leader Beryl E. Escott, Mission Improbable: A salute to the RAF women of SOE in wartime France, London, Patrick Stevens Limited, 1991. ISBN 1-85260-289-9
- Liane Jones, A Quiet Courage: Women Agents in the French Resistance, London, Transworld Publishers Ltd, 1990. ISBN 0-593-01663-7
