= Claude de Baissac =

Mauritian agent of SOE (1907–1974)

Claude Marie Marc Boucherville de Baissac
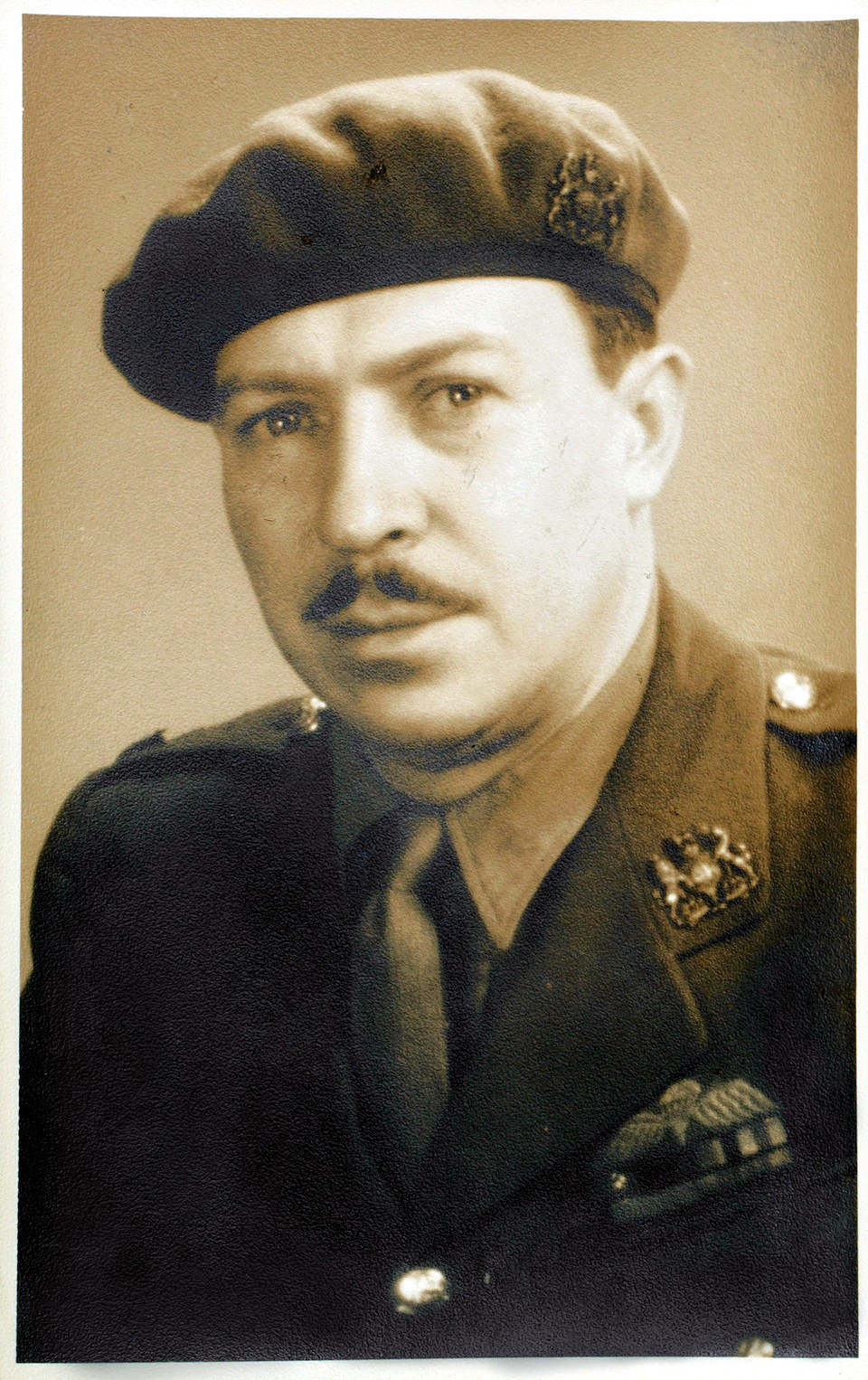
- Born: 28 February 1907
- Died: 22 December 1974 (aged 67)
- Other names: Claude de Baissac; David
- Known for: French Resistance; Special Operations Executive agent
- Spouse: Mary Katherine Herbert
- Relatives: Lisé de Baissac (sister)

Claude Marie Marc Boucherville de Baissac, DSO and bar, CdeG, known as Claude de Baissac or by his codename David (born 28 February 1907, Curepipe, Mauritius; died 22 December 1974) was a Mauritian of French descent who was an agent of the United Kingdom's clandestine Special Operations Executive (SOE) organization in France during World War II. The purpose of SOE was to conduct espionage, sabotage, and reconnaissance in countries occupied by the Axis powers, especially Nazi Germany. SOE agents allied themselves with resistance groups and supplied them with weapons and equipment parachuted in from England.

De Baissac was the leader of an important SOE network called Scientist. He worked in the city of Bordeaux and southwestern France from July 1942 to August 1943, organizing and supplying the French Resistance with arms and gathering intelligence on blockade-running ships entering and leaving Bordeaux harbor. He flew back to England when his network was betrayed, but returned to action in Normandy from February to August 1944, carrying out sabotage missions against the Germans after the D-Day invasion of France by the allies. His elder sister Lise was also an SOE agent and worked with him.

== Early life ==
Claude de Baissac was born in Mauritius. His father was Marie Louis Marc de Boucherville Baissac (1878-1945) and his mother was Marie Louise Jeanette Dupont. He was the youngest of the couple's three children. His family were large landowners in Mauritius, but British subjects as all Mauritians then were. The family moved to Paris in 1919.

Prior to World War II, de Baissac was employed by a mica mining company on Madagascar and at an advertising agency in Paris. In 1940, Paris was occupied by the Germans. His eldest brother, Jean de Baissac, joined the British Army. With his sister Lise, de Baissac travelled to the Dordogne region in southern France in an attempt to reach England. He obtained help with travel arrangements to England from the American Consulate and crossed into Spain and went to Lisbon, where he and his sister waited for five months for permission to travel to Gibraltar and on to the UK. The pair arrived in Scotland in 1941. Both Claude and Lise were recruited by the Special Operations Executive (SOE). Because of their proficiency in both English and French, Mauritians were often recruited as agents in France by the SOE. Fourteen would serve with the SOE during World War II.

== World War II ==
In March 1942, de Baissac joined SOE in the same class of trainees as Francis Suttill, Harry Peulevé, and Roger Landes. His leadership qualities were recognized, but he was also regarded as "volatile" and "stubborn." F Section leader Maurice Buckmaster would later call him "the most difficult of my officers without any exception." De Baissac and his sister, Lise, shared the family characteristic of being "difficult but determined." In the words of SOE's official historian, M.R.D. Foot, de Baissac was of "exceptional character" but "suffered no fool gladly." He was "an imposing man with the air of someone who expected to be obeyed."

=== First mission ===
De Baissac's first mission began the night of 29/30 July 1942, when he and his wireless operator Harry Peulevé were parachuted blind (no welcoming party) from a Halifax near Nîmes, However, they were dropped from too low an altitude and landed badly. De Baissac sprained his ankle and Peulevé broke a leg. De Baissac left Peulevé (and his wireless) behind. After recovering from his injury, he continued on to Bordeaux in late August to establish the Scientist network. His duties were defined as to prepare for sabotage operations against the blockade runners entering the port of Bordeaux carrying vital products such as rubber from Southeast Asia for the use of Nazi Germany.

In the following months, de Baissac received additional personnel: Roger Landes, (codenamed Stanislas), a wireless operator, parachuted into France on the night of 31 Oct/1 November), and Mary Herbert (codenamed Marie-Louise), a courier, landed by boat on 3/4 November, and Victor Charles Hayes, an explosives expert, arrived by parachute on 18/19 November 1942. A second wireless operator, Marcel Défense, arrived on 13 May 1943. with three new and better radios enabled Landes to locate radios at different locations and move from place to transmit and receive messages and thus run less risk of capture. De Baissac's sister Lise, stationed in Poitiers, was a liaison of Scientist with other networks. De Baissac's Scientist network and the Prosper network of Francis Suttill, based in Paris, were the two most promising SOE networks in France.

In Bordeaux, de Baissac quickly found success, building up two groups of resistors, potential saboteurs among the left-wing workers in the port of Bordeaux, and a larger group of rural resistors led by right-wing former French army officers. He also had contacts in Paris for liaison with Prosper. Each SOE network was supposed to operate independently with little contact between networks, an unrealized objective because of a shortage of wireless operators

In December 1942 a commando raid, Operation Frankton, carried out by Royal Marines was launched against ships in Bordeaux port. Baissac was unaware of the plans for the raid and was poised to launch a similar mission to sink ships in the harbor. The commando raid was only partially successful and de Baissac was angry about the raid and had to cancel his plans for sabotaging the port because of increased German security. On 1 November 2011, a BBC Timewatch television documentary called "The Most Courageous Raid of WWII" was narrated by Paddy Ashdown, a former SBS officer. Ashdown described the lack of coordination among government agencies as "a Whitehall cock-up of major proportions." The loss of the opportunity for the commandos and de Baissac to work together to strike a harder blow against the Germans in a combined operation led to the setting up of an office in London with responsibility for avoiding inter-departmental rivalry and duplication. De Baissac continued to gather information about the coming and going of ships from Bordeaux and by fall 1943 blockade-running had largely been prevented.

De Baissac returned to London on the night of 17/18 March 1943 in a Lysander and parachuted back into France on 14 April. During his visit to London, de Baissac told SOE headquarters that he had a force of 3,000 to 4,000 men, mostly in Gascony, to resist the German occupation. With widespread anticipation of an allied invasion of France in 1943, SOE began delivering by air drop large quantities of arms and supplies to the resistors. By fall, the Scientist network reported that nearly 20,000 men scattered around southwestern France had been recruited by the resistance. In the words of the SOE's official historian, M.R.D. Foot, the expansion was too rapid for the security of the network—and the Germans noticed.

==== Disaster ====
On 23 June 1943, de Baissac had scheduled a meeting with Prosper leader Francis Suttill in Paris. Suttill didn't show up; he had been arrested by the Gestapo. What followed was the arrest of hundreds of French resisters and SOE agents and the destruction of most of SOE's activities in northern France. De Baissac requested or was ordered to return to England to avoid arrest and he and his sister, Lise, flew back by Lysander on the night of 16/17 August along with Nicholas Bodington. Roger Landes, Vic Hayes, Marcel Défense, and Mary Herbert (pregnant with de Baissac's child) remained in Bordeaux to continue working. Landes was furious that de Baissac had taken his sister Lise with him to England and left Mary Herbert behind.

De Baissac's most important French colleague, André Grandclément, was a retired army colonel and a leader of the right-wing resistance organization, the Organisation civile et militaire. In September 1943, Grandclément was arrested by the Germans and to protect his wife and secure his release was persuaded by the Germans to become a double agent. He betrayed the Scientist network, resulting in the capture of many of its people and the confiscation of most of the arms which had been parachuted in from England. Scientist was destroyed as an operating network. Landes fled France, crossing into Spain and eventually making it to England. Mary Herbert went into hiding, living in Lise de Baissac's former apartment in Poitiers and giving birth to a daughter, Claudine, in December 1943. Hayes was arrested on 14 October and later died in German custody or was executed. Défense escaped to England, but later returned to France and was captured and executed.

=== Second mission ===
De Baissac parachuted back into France the night of 10/11 February 1944 with the objective of reconstituting the Scientist network in southern Normandy. (Unknown to De Baissac and the French Resistance, Normandy would be the landing site of allied forces in the D-Day invasion of France on 6 June 1944.) De Baissac's area of operations was south of a line reaching from Avranches in the southwest to Caen in the northeast. Recognizing that the area was too large to be supervised by a single person, he put Jean Renaud-Dandicolle in charge of the north along with Mauritian Maurice Larcher, a wireless operator. (Renaud-Dandicolle and Larcher were killed in a gun battle with the Germans in July.) De Baissac focused on more southerly areas and he was joined in early May by his sister Lise and wireless operator Phyllis Latour.

When he arrived in Normandy, de Baissac commented wryly about the resistance that "the secret army is so secret, I can't find it." Over the next three months he concentrated on building up resistance groups in various areas and supplying them with arms, identifying landing grounds for the arrival of supplies and, after D-Day, to be used by paratroopers and commandos. He forbade sabotage by the resistance groups he supplied and advised until D-Day by which time he had created an "efficient sabotage and small-scale guerilla organization."

De Baissac reported that his resistance groups put more than 500 German vehicles out of action. His groups cut railway and telephone lines, and gathered intelligence on German troop dispositions and movements. On several occasions he was said to have participated in armed combat against German soldiers, notably on one occasion when he and a small group of men held off a German patrol attempting to capture parachuted arms destined for the resistance. De Baissac's operations were carried out in an environment in which German soldiers were present in large numbers as they attempted to repel the invading allied forces. For example, one of de Baissac's headquarters was a schoolhouse in Orne where he stored equipment and radios. The Germans commandeered the ground floor of the school, but de Baissac's people continued to operate out of a back room of the same building. For his personal security and to manage his network, de Baissac slept in a different place nearly every night, often in a farmer's hayloft.

On 25 July, the American army launched Operation Cobra which forced the German army to retreat rapidly from the Scientist area of operation. On 13 August, Claude and Lise de Baissac linked up with a lead unit of U.S. soldiers. Dressed in long-unworn British military uniforms, they stood in front of the mayor's office in a provincial town and greeted the American soldiers arriving in the town.

De Baissac's second mission was not without controversy. Never reluctant to express his political views, de Baissac opposed the operations of Charles de Gaulle's Free French forces encroaching on the Scientist area of operations. After he linked up with the American army on 13 August, SOE quickly removed him and his sister from France by flying them to England.

=== Hunting for Mary Herbert ===
In September 1944, Claude and Lise de Baissac were back in France, now liberated from German control, as part of the Judex mission which aimed to locate lost and captured SOE agents and the French people who had helped them. They had lost contact with Mary Katherine Herbert, the mother of de Baissac's child. They traced Herbert from Bordeaux to Poitiers and found her and her daughter living in a farm house near Poitiers. The de Baissacs then returned to England with Herbert and the child, named Claudine. Claude married Herbert, but it was apparently a marriage only of propriety as the couple did not live together. While in France, de Baissac tied up loose ends and recommended compensation for his French associates.

== Later life ==
After the war, de Baissac worked for the Allied Control Commission in Germany and became a director for a mining company in west Africa. De Baissac divorced Mary Herbert in 1959 and married a woman from Cameroon, Colette Avril, in 1964. The couple later moved to Aix-en-Provence where he headed security for a bank. He died in 1974

== Medals/Honours ==
- UK: DSO and bar
- France: Knight of the Légion d'honneur; Croix de guerre 1939-1945

== Sources ==
- Michael Richard Daniell Foot, SOE in France. An account of the Work of the British Special Operations Executive in France, 1940–1944, London, Her Majesty's Stationery Office, 1966, 1968; Whitehall History Publishing, in association with Frank Cass, 2004.
- Guy Penaud, Histoire secrète de la Résistance dans le Sud-Ouest, Éditions Sud-Ouest, 1993
