= André Grandclément =

Resistance leader and double agent

André Grandclément (28 July 1909 – 27 July 1944) was a leader in the French Resistance during the Second World War, who turned traitor and became a double agent, assisting the Nazi regime to significantly weaken the resistance movement in Bordeaux.

== Early life ==
André Marie Hubert Grandclément was born in Rochefort on 28 July 1909, the son of Admiral Raoul Gaston Grandclément and Amelie de Barole. He was educated in Paris, Beirut, and Tunis. He joined the army in 1928, and married for the second time in 1929. After suffering a serious fall from a horse in 1934 he left the army and became an insurance broker in Bordeaux.

== Wartime activities ==
In 1941 he founded a resistance network in the Bordeaux area. After joining the Civil and Military Organization in 1942, he became its head in Aquitaine and, with the help of the British Special Operations Executive, he strongly developed his regional network, arming and training several thousand agents, and setting up an escape route and a radio link with London.

After Claude de Baissac, organiser of the Special Operations Executive SCIENTIST network was informed by France Antelme of the existence of the very strong resistance organisation in Bordeaux led by Grandclément, which was eager to receive weapons and equipment, he made contact with Grandclément and by mid-1943 the number of weapons drops was estimated at 150, equipping 42,000 potential fighters.

When de Baissac was flown to Britain in August 1943, SCIENTIST's wireless operator Roger Landes took control of the network just as a Gestapo crackdown led to many arrests, including Grandclément's wife. Fearing for his wife's life, and suspicious of communist influence within the Maquis, the right-wing André Grandclément agreed to help the Germans, and the number of arrests increased and the SCIENTIST network began to collapse. Landes had long considered Grandclément to be a security risk but agreed to meet him, the Germans having let Grandclément attend the meeting, during which he explained his intentions to expose dozens of arms dumps which would destroy many months work. Landes drew his pistol but hesitated to shoot Grandclément in cold blood never having previously shot anyone, and let him go.

It proved to be a costly error of judgement as two months later Grandclément's actions had crippled SCIENTIST, and led to the capture and execution of the circuit's arms instructor, Victor Hayes. Landes was forced to flee, and was then recalled to London, leaving on 1 November 1943. In London he was suspected of being a double agent, but his name was cleared and he returned to Bordeaux in March 1944 as organiser of the ACTOR network, a new circuit tasked with making contact with surviving Resistance groups in the area and coordinating sabotage to support the D-Day landings.

In July 1944 Grandclément and his wife, Lucette, were captured by Resistance forces near Bordeaux. Having let Grandclément walk away in September 1943, Landes gave the order for his execution. Grandclément and his wife were told that they were to be flown to England to argue their case, and were taken to the supposed landing site. Once there, Landes told Grandclément that he would have to be separated from his wife for security reasons, and then shot Grandclément's wife, while Grandclément was executed by one of Landes's men.

Although Landes learned after the war that Lucette Grandclément was opposed to her husband's actions, he later explained that he had concluded that he could not let her go, given the risk she presented to his group.
