= Roger Landes =

British spy (1916–2008)

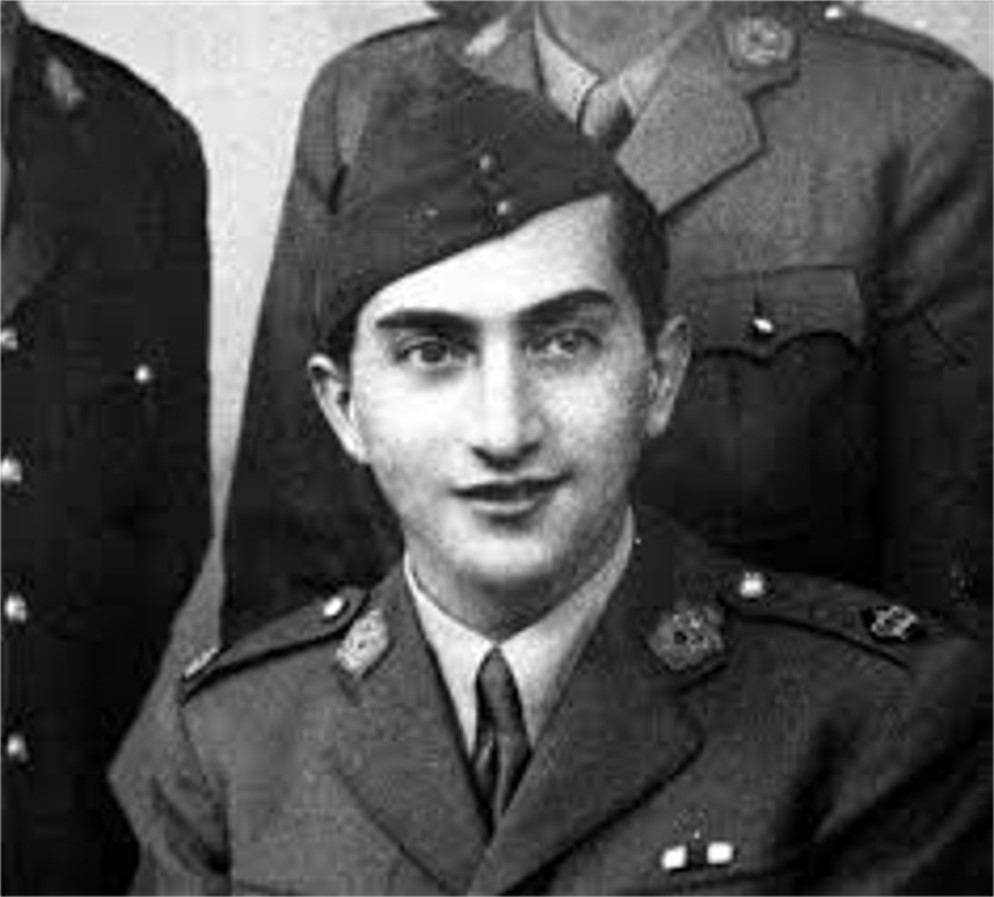
- Roger Landes, c. 1942
- Born: Roger Arthur Landes; 16 December 1916; Paris, France
- Died: 16 July 2008 (aged 91); Hampshire, England
- Other names: Stanislas, Aristide
- Military career
- Allegiance: United Kingdom
- Branch: Special Operations Executive
- Service years: 1941–1945
- Rank: Major
- Conflicts: World War II

Roger Arthur Landes, LdH CdeG MC & Bar (16 December 1916 – 16 July 2008), code named Stanislas and Aristide, was an agent of the United Kingdom's clandestine Special Operations Executive (SOE) organization during World War II in France. The purpose of SOE was to conduct espionage, sabotage, and reconnaissance in countries occupied by the Axis powers, especially Nazi Germany. SOE agents allied themselves with resistance groups and supplied them with weapons and equipment parachuted in from England. Landes was a wireless operator for the Scientist network in the Bordeaux region of France, and later became the "organiser" (leader) of the Actor network in the same region. After the liberation from German occupation of France in 1944, he joined Force 136 to subvert the Japanese occupation of Malaya.

Landes is best known for his assassination of double agent André Grandclément and Grandclément's wife. He was an effective agent for the SOE, organizing and arming the French Resistance in southwestern France, and evading capture by the German occupiers. He is described by a biographer as a "cautious secret agent with an uncanny ability to vanish into the crowd."

== Biography ==
Roger Landes was born in Paris the second son (of three) to Barnet Landes, a Polish-Jewish father, and a Russian-Jewish mother. Barnet's grandfather had fled Russian Poland to avoid the pogroms and Imperial conscription, setting up a jewelry business in Hatton Garden before settling in Paris. Barnet's children had then fought for Britain in the First World War. Barnet spoke poor English and so preferred to live in Paris and run a jewelry business there. Roger Landes was educated in France. He remained there with one of his two brothers until his parents' business collapsed during the Great Depression and they moved to London. Landes graduated in architecture at the École des Beaux Arts before also moving to London in 1938 after the Munich Crisis, where he joined London County Council as a quantity surveyor.

== World War II ==
Landes was conscripted into the Royal Corps of Signals in March 1941 and, speaking better French than English and already knowing Morse code, he was recruited into SOE (F section) in March 1942. SOE was desperate for French-speaking wireless operators and Landes was "an intelligent, careful, self-reliant and unobtrusive student, a perfect candidate for wireless work." Landes reported for work at SOE on 17 March 1942,

=== First mission. ===
Landes first mission, with his codename as Aristide, was as radio operator to the SCIENTIST network of Claude de Baissac (David). He parachuted into France with Gilbert Norman on the night of 31 October 1942. Arriving in Bordeaux, he made contact with de Baissac and, after initial problems, found a house from which he could send and receive messages from SOE in Paris. The work of a wireless operator was dull, dangerous, and lonely. Landes followed a careful routine to avoid attracting the attention of the German and French police. Every morning he took a long walk and, once certain he was not followed, collected messages from secret letter boxes; in the afternoons he went to a cinema and slept; at night, alone in his house, he transmitted and received messages. He used two couriers to carry messages back and forth to de Baissac and other SOE agents. SOE's Mary Katherine Herbert was one courier. The second was a young French woman from Bordeaux named Ginette Corbin. Landes had to worry about German wireless detector vans which patrolled the streets and curious neighbors who might inform on him to the Germans in exchange for a reward. The arrival of a second wireless operator, Marcel Défense, on 13 May 1943 with three new and better radios enabled Landes to locate radios at different locations and move from place to transmit and receive messages and thus run less risk of capture.

In June 1943, the Germans penetrated and destroyed the Prosper network in Paris and the fallout put the Scientist agents in Bordeaux in danger. De Baissac requested or was ordered to return to England to avoid arrest and he and his sister, Lise, flew back by Lysander on the night of 15/16 August. Roger Landes, Vic Hayes, Marcel Défense, and Mary Herbert (pregnant with de Baissac's child) remained in Bordeaux to continue working. Landes, left in charge, was furious that de Baissac had taken his sister Lise with him to England and left Mary Herbert behind. He relieved Herbert of all duties and put her into a clinic near Bordeaux where she had her baby.

==== The Grandclément affair. ====
The most important contact of the Scientist network in Bordeaux was André Grandclément, a retired army colonel and a leader of the far-right resistance organization, the Organisation civile et militaire (OCM). Grandclément's wife was arrested by the Germans on 29 July 1943 and on 19 September 1943, Grandclément was also arrested. To protect his wife and secure his own release Grandclément was persuaded by the Germans to become a double agent. With information he provided, the Germans were able to arrest many OCM members and confiscate many of the arms that had been parachuted into them for resistance to the Germans.

Landes became aware of Grandclément's turncoat agreement with the Germans. On 24 September Grandclément met with Landes and other members of the Scientist network at the house of Charles Corbin, father of Landes's courier Ginette Corbin. Landes, armed with a pistol, intended to kill Grandclément, but was dissuaded by Corbin who did not want a gunshot to attract the Gestapo's attention to his house and family. Grandclément was allowed to leave the house unharmed. It then became a race between Landes to warn his associates to flee or go underground and the Germans to arrest them. With the information provided by Grandclément, the Germans were able to arrest 78 of Landes's associates and confiscate thousands of guns and millions of rounds of ammunition that SOE had parachuted into the resistance groups. Défence and Hays were captured and executed. On 26 November 1943, Landes gave each of his surviving resistance leaders 25,000 francs (about 125 British pounds) for living expenses and set out on foot with Charles Corbin to cross the Pyrenees to Spain. Arriving in Spain they were arrested by the Spanish authorities, but released after British intervention. Landes and Corbin arrived in England by airplane from Gibraltar on 16 January 1944.

=== Second mission ===
Landes was suspected of being a double agent because of his "miraculous" escape from capture by the Germans, but his name was cleared and he returned to Bordeaux in March 1944 as organiser of the Actor network, a new circuit tasked with making contact with surviving Resistance groups in the area and coordinating sabotage to support the upcoming D-Day landings. Landes's second mission began on 1/2 March 1944 with an aborted attempt to parachute him back into France, in Gascony this time, postponed to the night of 2/3 March 1944. The second attempt was successful. He was accompanied by a Canadian wireless operator, Allyre Sirois. Landes was now a hardened and experienced SOE operative, one of only a few who had survived as long as he had in occupied France. He had a new code name: "Aristide."

Landes created the Actor network from the remains of the Scientist network. He equipped a large number of resistance groups and personally led several. Landes' authority was based on his capability of providing arms to resistance groups. He imposed strict security rules on the leaders and groups of the French resistance which he supported with parachuted arms drops that began on 1 April 1944. A violator of his rules faced one of two fates: dismissal or execution. Two incompetent agents sent him from England by SOE were quickly evacuated to Spain. Landes ran afoul of some French resistance leaders, notably the right wing, Anglophobic soldier Jean-Baptiste Morraglia, who arrived in Bordeaux on 6 May and attempted to take charge of the resistance in the region on behalf of Free France leader Charles de Gaulle. Landes and Morraglia immediately clashed and the resistance fragmented into politically warring groups.

Despite his problems, by 6 June 1944, when the allied invasion of Normandy took place, Landes had equipped a fighting force of 5,000 men. His forces launched many attacks against the German occupiers and crippled the ability of the Germans to move their soldiers from place to place to meet the allied threat.

Assassination of Grandclément. The double-agent André Grandclément was captured by the French resistance on 22 July 1944. He attempted, with some success, to persuade his captors that his actions were justifiable. The resistance had been ordered by French authorities in London to kill Grandclémeent and his wife, Lucette, who had also been captured. The death sentence was broadcast on the BBC. However, Grandclément defended his actions persuasively and his captors in Bordeaux were reluctant to carry out the order. Instead, they turned their prisoners over to Landes. On 28 July on Landes' order, his men shot and killed Grandclément. On the same day, Landes killed Lucette with a bullet to the back of her head. She had disapproved of her husband's collaboration with the Germans. On 1 August, the Germans shot 50 hostages, attributed, but later disproven, to be in retaliation for the killing of Grandclément.

Bordeaux was liberated from German occupation on 28 August 1944. By that time the city was a "viper's nest of betrayal, score-settling, and manoeuvering for advantage." Landes spent the last days of the German occupation coordinating attacks by the resistance forces and calling in air strikes on ships attempting to evacuate German soldiers from Bordeaux.

Landes and De Gaulle. On 17 September 1944, French leader Général de Gaulle visited Bordeaux. Landes drove to meet him in a jeep decorated with the flag of Great Britain. not a wise decision given de Gaulle's antipathy towards the British. De Gaulle, six feet five inches (196 cm) in height confronted Landes, five feet four inches (163 cm) in height. He said to Landes, "You're English? Your place is not here" and told him to leave the country within 2 days. Landes replied that he was a British officer who would leave France only when ordered by the British. Later in the day, Landes had an armed confrontation with French officials and 4,000 people demonstrated in support of him. The French complained about Landes to British authorities in London and he was ordered by SOE to leave France. He stayed for a while, claiming poor health, but finally left France on 10 October. In England, he was hospitalized due to his physical condition. De Gaulle's reaction to Landes and other SOE agents reflected De Gaulle's "obsession with restoring the authority of the state and allowing no challenges to its – to his – authority."

== Southeast Asia ==
In 1945, Landes volunteered to join SOE's Force 136 in Southeast Asia to take part in the war against Japan.In March he was sent to Colombo, and in May he and 15 commandos were parachuted into the Malayan jungle near the Thailand frontier. His actions as part of this special unit brought him a bar on his Military Cross.

== Appraisal and later life ==
Landes is usually considered one of the most effective of more than 400 SOE agents sent to France. An appraisal of him by the head of SOE French section, Maurice Buckmaster, was: "As a man he is not awfully attractive and I think his friends are as a whole most unpleasing. I wish he would not wear exotic uniforms. Thank God, he doesn't wear much scent. But if you want a brave man for a lost venture, choose Landes." Landes was even complimented later by the Gestapo chief in Bordeaux, Frederik Dohse, "Nothing in his previous life had in any way predestined him for the extremely dangerous role he now played so well."

Living in England, Landes "was an outsider...no more than a curious little anonymous Frenchman." Like another SOE agent of modest heritage, Michael Trotobas who worked, died, and was eulogized in Lille, Landes was little honoured in England, but in Bordeaux after the war Landes was a hero, welcomed on his visits to the city with dinners in his honor and reunions with old colleagues.

On 29 July 1947, Landes married Ginette Corbin, his courier in Bordeaux and the daughter of Charles Corbin, his colleague in the French resistance. The couple lived in London and had a son, Alain Henri Léon, in 1949. Landes worked mostly in the jewelry business, with only modest success. Landes was devoted to his wife who died in 1983, age 61. He married Margaret Laing in 1990, and the couple bought a home in Hampshire. Landes suffered from dementia in his later years and died on 16 July 2008.

== Recognition ==
Landes was the recipient of a Military Cross from the United Kingdom and at the end of 1945 he received a bar to his Military Cross. He was awarded the Croix de Guerre by France. In 1992 he was made an Officer of the Légion d'honneur. A biography of Landes, titled Aristide, was published in 1994.

== Sources ==
- Michael Richard Daniell Foot, SOE in France. An account of the Work of the British Special Operations Executive in France, 1940-1944, London, Her Majesty's Stationery Office, 1966, 1968; Whitehall History Publishing, in association with Frank Cass, 2004.
- E. H. Cookridge, Missions spéciales, translated from the English by Paule Ravenel, Librairie Arthème Fayard, 1966. 2nd part :Roger Landes et la libération de Bordeaux.
- (in French) Guy Penaud, Histoire secrète de la Résistance dans le Sud-Ouest, Éditions Sud Ouest, 1993.
- (in French) Raymond Ruffin, Ces Chefs de Maquis qui gênaient, Presses de la Cité, 1980. See second part, Ceux qu'on jugeait indésirables, ch. VIII à XI Roger Landes en Aquitaine.
- "Obituary - Roger Landes". The Times. 17 July 2008. Archived from the original on 8 October 2008.
- Foot, MRD (14 August 2008). "Obituary - Roger Landes". The Guardian.
