= Saint-Aubin-du-Désert =

- Commune
- Location of Saint-Aubin-du-Désert
- Location within France Location within Pays de la Loire
- Coordinates: 48°18′18″N 0°11′34″W
- Country: France
- Region: Pays de la Loire
- Department: Mayenne
- Arrondissement: Mayenne
- Canton: Villaines-la-Juhel
- Intercommunality: CC du Mont des Avaloirs

Government
  - Mayor (2020–2026): Samuel Ragot
- Area^{1}: 12.83 km^{2} (4.95 sq mi)
- Elevation: 178 m (584 ft)
- Highest elevation: 227 m (745 ft)
- Lowest elevation: 120 m (390 ft)
- Population (2023): 227
  - Density: 17.7/km^{2} (45.8/sq mi)
- Time zone: UTC+01:00 (CET)
  - Summer (DST): UTC+02:00 (CEST)
- INSEE/Postal code: 53198 /53700
- ^{1} French Land Register data, which excludes lakes, ponds, glaciers > 1 km^{2} (0.386 sq mi or 247 acres) and river estuaries.

Saint-Aubin-du-Désert (French pronunciation: [sɛ̃.t‿obɛ̃ dy dezɛʁ]) is a commune in the Mayenne department in north-western France.

== See also ==
- Communes of Mayenne
