= Phil Lamason =

New Zealand World War II pilot (1918–2012)

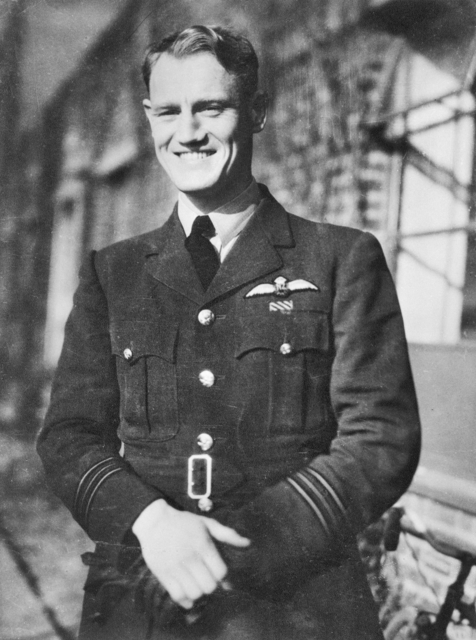
- Lamason c. 1942
- Born: 15 September 1918; Napier, New Zealand
- Died: 19 May 2012 (aged 93); Dannevirke, New Zealand
- Military career
- Allegiance: New Zealand
- Branch: Royal New Zealand Air Force
- Service years: 1940–1945
- Rank: Squadron Leader
- Service number: 403460
- Units: No. 218 Squadron RAF; No. 15 Squadron RAF
- Conflicts: Second World War
- Awards: Distinguished Flying Cross & Bar; Mentioned in Despatches (2)
- Other work: Farmer; stock agent

Phillip John Lamason, DFC* (15 September 1918 – 19 May 2012) was a pilot in the Royal New Zealand Air Force (RNZAF) during the Second World War, who rose to prominence as the senior officer in charge of 168 Allied airmen taken to Buchenwald concentration camp, Germany, in August 1944. Raised in Napier, he joined the RNZAF in September 1940, and by April 1942 was a pilot officer serving with the Royal Air Force in Europe. On 8 June 1944, Lamason was in command of a Lancaster heavy bomber that was shot down during a raid on railway marshalling yards near Paris. Bailing out, he was picked up by members of the French Resistance and hidden at various locations for seven weeks. While attempting to reach Spain along the Comet line, Lamason was betrayed by a double agent within the Resistance and seized by the Gestapo.

After interrogation, he was taken to Fresnes prison. Classified as a Terrorflieger, he was not accorded prisoner-of-war (POW) status, but instead treated as a criminal and spy. By 15 August 1944, Lamason was senior officer of a group of 168 captured Allied airmen who were taken by train to Buchenwald concentration camp, arriving there five days later.

At Buchenwald, the airmen were fully shaved, starved, denied shoes, and for three weeks forced to sleep outside without shelter in one of the sub-camps known as "Little Camp". As senior officer, Lamason took control and instilled a level of military discipline and bearing.

For several weeks Lamason negotiated with the camp authorities to have the airmen transferred to a POW camp, but his requests were denied. At great risk, Lamason secretly got word to the Luftwaffe of the Allied airmen's captivity and, seven days before their scheduled execution, 156 of the 168 prisoners were transferred to Stalag Luft III. Most of the airmen credit their survival at Buchenwald to the leadership and determination of Lamason. After the war, he moved to Dannevirke and became a farmer until his retirement. During the 1980s and 1990s, he was a regular speaker at KLB Club and POW reunions.

== Early career ==
Lamason was born and raised in Napier, a city in New Zealand's North Island, on 15 September 1918. He was educated at Napier Boys' High School and Massey University (Palmerston North campus) where he was awarded a Diploma in Sheep farming.

During this period, Lamason described himself as "a bit of a ratbag". Prior to the war, he worked for the Department of Agriculture at New Plymouth as a stock inspector. It was there Lamason took the opportunity of free flying lessons, clocking up 100 hours. He was described as a tall, good-looking man with blue eyes and a broken nose.

Lamason joined the RNZAF in September 1940. By April 1942, he had been posted to the European theatre of operations as a pilot officer in No. 218 Squadron RAF. During a bombing raid on Pilsen, Czechoslovakia, he was in command of an aircraft that was attacked by an enemy fighter and badly damaged, but managed to return to base. As a result of his actions, he was awarded the Distinguished Flying Cross (DFC) on 15 May 1942. The citation read:

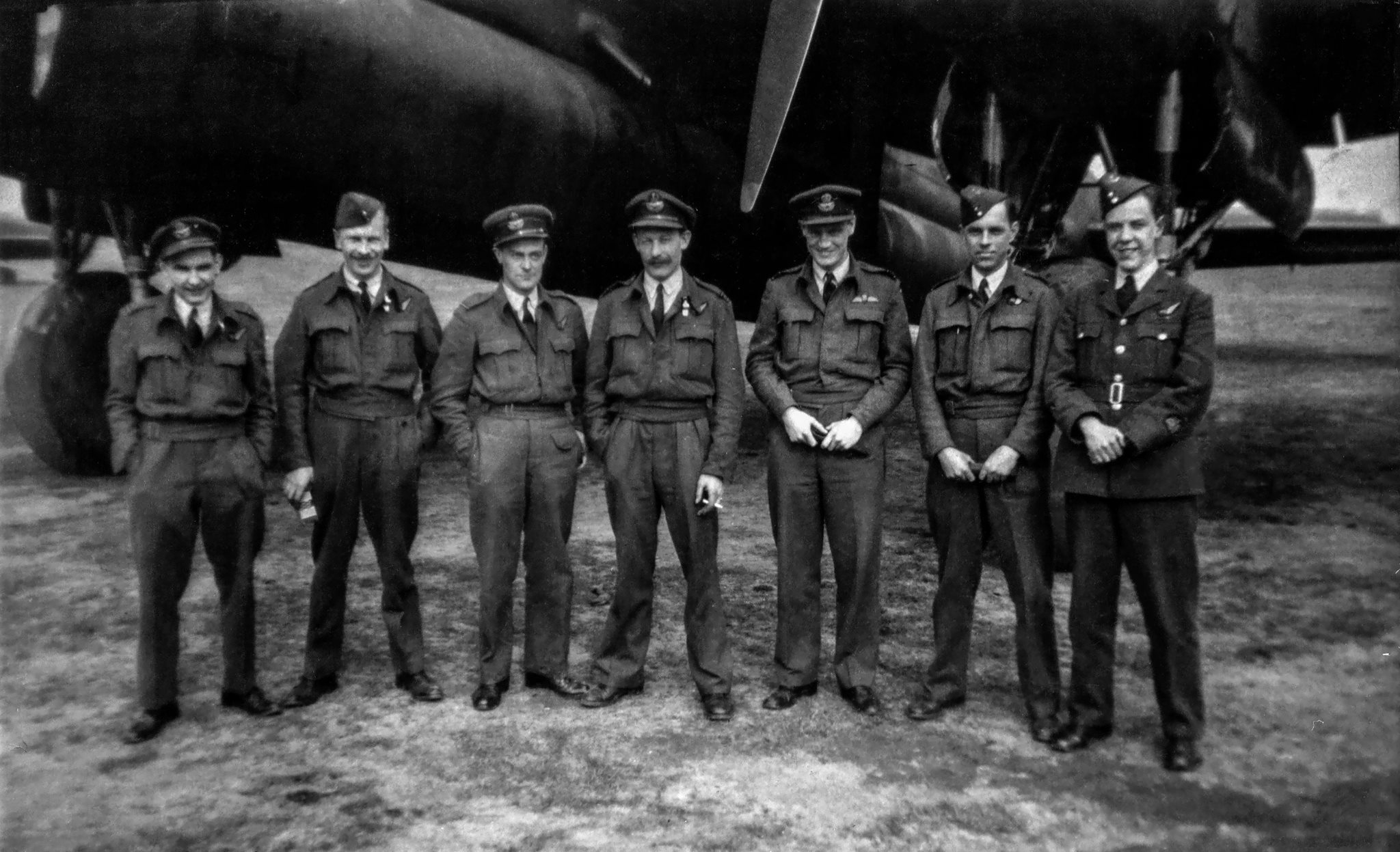
Lamason (third from right) and his crew standing in front of their Lancaster heavy bomber; early 1944.

Pilot Officer Philip John. LAMASON, (N.Z. 403460), Royal New Zealand Air Force, No. 218 Squadron. One night in April, 1942, this officer was the captain of an aircraft which attacked Pilsen. During the return flight his aircraft was attacked by an enemy fighter and sustained damage; the hydraulics were shot away and the turret rendered unserviceable, while a fire broke out in the middle of the fuselage. Displaying great presence of mind, Pilot Officer Lamason coolly directed his crew in the emergency and, while 2 of them dealt with the fire, he skilfully outmanoeuvred his attacker and finally shook him off. By his fine airmanship and great devotion to duty, Pilot Officer Lamason was undoubtedly responsible for the safe return of the aircraft and its crew. This officer has completed 21 sorties and he has at all times displayed courage and ability.

After his first tour ended flying Stirlings with 218 Squadron, Lamason then instructed other pilots at 1657 Heavy Conversion Unit. Returning to operations with No. 15 Squadron RAF, Lamason was twice Mentioned in Despatches, first on 2 June 1943 and again, having received promotion to acting squadron leader, on 14 January 1944. He was awarded a Bar to his DFC on 27 June 1944, for "courage and devotion to duty of a high order" and "vigorous determination" in attacks on Berlin and other heavily defended targets. Lamason was presented his award after the war by King George VI at Buckingham Palace, where he met and befriended a young Princess Elizabeth. A day after making an emergency landing at an American base in England, Lamason was introduced to, shook hands and spoke with Clark Gable.

Lamason was not afraid to speak his mind. On the night of 30/31 March 1944, when 795 bombers were sent to attack Nuremberg, he was very critical of the route chosen, warning his station commander that heavy losses could be expected. On the moonlit night, 95 bombers were lost, its heaviest losses of the entire war during a single raid.

== Buchenwald ==
On 8 June 1944, Lamason was serving as a flight commander in a Lancaster LM575 LS-H of No. 15 Squadron RAF, on his 45th operation, when he was shot down during a raid on railway marshalling yards at Massy-Palaiseau near Paris.

Lamason recalled:

On the night of the raid our bomber was spotted by a German fighter, which locked on to it. I decided to turn and fight him. Within seconds an incendiary round hit a wing and caught the fuel tank. I gave the order to bail out as the gas torched. But Robbie, our mid-upper gunner, kept on firing. When he eventually did jump, we no longer had enough height. I saw his parachute open, but too late. He must have died on impact. I pushed the navigator out and managed to jump clear at the last minute.

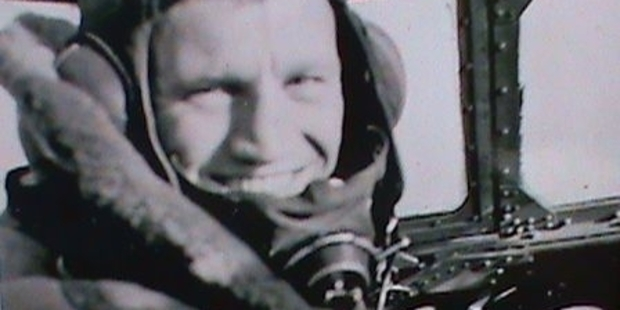
Lamason in the pilot's seat of the cockpit of a Stirling Bomber in 1942

Along with his English navigator, Flying Officer Ken Chapman, Lamason was picked up by members of the French Resistance and hidden at various locations for seven weeks. In August 1944, while attempting to reach Spain along the Comet line, Lamason and Chapman were captured by the Gestapo in Paris after they were betrayed by the French double agent Jacques Desoubrie for 10,000 francs each. After interrogation at the Gestapo headquarters in Paris, they were taken to Fresnes Prison. Many fliers were classified as "Terrorflieger" (terror flier) by the Germans, and were not given a trial. The most common act for Allied airmen to be classified a terror flier was to be captured in civilian clothing and/or without their dog tags. The German Foreign Office decided that these captured enemy airmen should not be given the legal status of prisoner of war (POWs) but should instead be treated as criminals and spies.

Consequently, Lamason was among a group of 168 Allied airmen from Great Britain, United States, Australia, Canada, New Zealand and Jamaica who—along with over 2,500 French prisoners—were taken by train in overcrowded cattle boxcars from Fresnes Prison outside Paris to Buchenwald concentration camp. As the airmen were herded into the boxcars, Lamason protested about the poor treatment of the airmen, only to be struck in the face by an SS guard. (Note: The day Lamason was struck by a SS guard is disputed. In the books Destination Buchenwald (p. 66), In the Shadows of War (pp. 233, 256) and Night After Night (p. 466), all authors stated that Lamason was hit by the guard on the first day, at the railway station outside Paris, as the airmen were herded into the boxcars. However, in an article in the New Zealand Evening Post, Lamason stated that he was hit by the SS guard the day after a French teenage boy was taken off the train and executed by the guards, during the five-day journey to Buchenwald.) Lamason fell to the ground and captured pilot Roy Allen watched as an SS Major pulled a Luger from his holster and thought Lamason would be shot on the spot. After five days travel, during which the airmen received very little food or water, they arrived at Buchenwald on 20 August 1944. (Note: During train stops to Buchenwald, Lamason emerged as the leader of the group and assumed command (Robb, 2009). However, it was not until the 168 airmen arrived at Buchenwald that it was firmly established that Lamason was the senior Allied officer. After Lamason, the senior Commonwealth officer was Flight Lieutenant Tom Blackham, and the senior US officer was Captain Merle Larson (Kinnis, p. 85).)

Buchenwald was a labour camp of about 60,000 inmates of mainly Russian POWs, but also common criminals, religious prisoners (including Jews), and various political prisoners from Germany, France, Poland, and Czechoslovakia. It was known for its brutality and barbaric medical experiments.

Upon arrival, Lamason, as ranking officer, demanded an interview with the camp commandant, Hermann Pister, which he was granted. He insisted that the airmen be treated as POWs under the Geneva Conventions and be sent to a POW camp. The commandant agreed that their arrival at Buchenwald was a "mistake" but they remained there anyway. The airmen were given the same poor treatment and beatings as the other inmates. For the first three weeks at Buchenwald, the prisoners were totally shaved, denied shoes and forced to sleep outside without shelter in one of Buchenwald's sub-camps, known as 'Little Camp'. Little Camp was a quarantine section of Buchenwald where the prisoners received the least food and harshest treatment.

After their first meal, Lamason stepped forward and said:

Attention!... Gentlemen, we have ourselves in a very fine fix indeed. The goons have completely violated the Geneva Convention and are treating us as common thieves and criminals. However, we are soldiers. From this time on, we will also conduct ourselves as our training has taught us and as our countries would expect from us. We will march as a unit to roll call and we will follow all reasonable commands as a single unit.

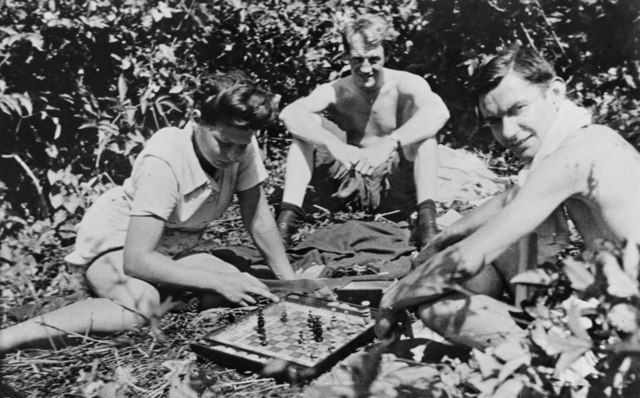
Lamason (centre) and another airman (Ken Chapman) playing chess in Chevreuse with a Frenchwoman whose family hid them for two weeks.

Lamason then instructed the group not to trust the SS, or provoke them in any way because as they had experienced on the train, the guards were unpredictable and trigger-happy. Also, they were not to explore the camp because of the chance of breaking unknown rules, but to stay together and keep as far away from the guards as possible. He further stated that acting on the group's behalf, he would make further contact with the camp authorities for recognition of their rights.

Lamason then proceeded to organise the airmen into groups by nationality and appointed a Commanding officer within each group. Lamason did not do this just to improve their morale but because he also saw it as his responsibility to carry on his war duties despite the adverse circumstances. Captured US pilot Joe Moser believed that Lamason also did this because if the right opportunity presented itself, the group would be able to operate much more effectively if military discipline and operations were applied.

Lamason's leadership boosted the airmen's spirits and gave them hope while instilling a level of discipline and bearing. One of the first assignments Lamason gave was to mount a guard detail, both day and night, to prevent pilfering by other inmates, which had begun during their first night at camp. During their incarceration, Lamason insisted the airmen march, parade and act as a military unit.

Within days of their arrival, Lamason met Edward Yeo-Thomas, a British spy being held at Buchenwald under the alias Kenneth Dodkin. Lamason, who knew the real Dodkin quite well, immediately became suspicious and later confided in Christopher Burney, who assured Lamason the cover was legitimate. Through Yeo-Thomas and Burney, Lamason was introduced to two Russian colonels, senior members of the International Camp Committee, an illegal underground resistance group of prisoners in the main camp.

As senior officer, Lamason had access to the main camp and quickly built a rapport with the group. As a result, he was able to secure extra blankets, clothes, clogs and food for the airmen. Lamason also built a rapport with two other prisoners; French scientist Alfred Balachowsky and Dutch Olympian trainer Jan Robert. Both men had developed trustworthy contacts within the camp administrative area and were able to provide Lamason with reliable intelligence that assisted in the survival of the airmen.

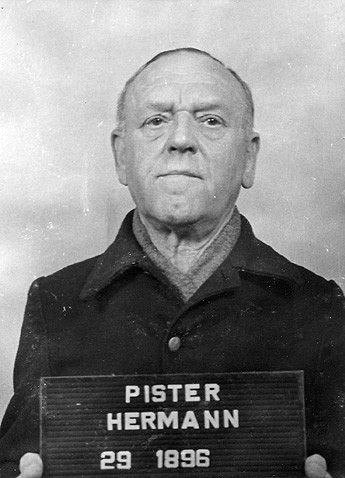
Hermann Pister, Commandant of the camp while the Allied airmen were prisoners there.

For the next six weeks, Lamason negotiated with Pister and the German camp authorities, but his requests to have the airmen transferred to proper POW camps were denied. One captured British airman, Pilot Officer Splinter Spierenburg, was a Dutchman flying for the Royal Air Force. Spierenburg, who spoke fluent German, regularly acted as an interpreter for Lamason when he negotiated with the camp authorities.

As Buchenwald was a forced labour camp, the German authorities had intended to put the 168 airmen to work as slave labor in the nearby armament factories. Consequently, Lamason was ordered by an SS officer to instruct the airmen to work, or he would be immediately executed by firing squad. Lamason refused to give the order and informed the officer that they were soldiers and could not and would not participate in war production. After a tense stand-off, during which time Lamason thought he would be shot, the SS officer eventually backed down.

Most airmen doubted they would ever get out of Buchenwald because their documents were stamped with the acronym "DIKAL" (Darf in kein anderes Lager), or "not to be transferred to another camp". At great risk, Lamason and Burney secretly smuggled a note through a trusted Russian prisoner, who worked at the nearby Nohra airfield, to the German Luftwaffe of their captivity at the camp. The message requested in part, that an officer pass the information to Berlin, and for the Luftwaffe to intercede on behalf of the airmen. Lamason understood that the Luftwaffe would be sympathetic to their predicament, as they would not want their captured men treated in the same way; he also knew that the Luftwaffe had the political connections to get the airmen transferred to a POW camp.

Eventually, Lamason's persistence paid off. Under the pretence of inspecting aerial bomb damage near the camp, two Luftwaffe officers (including Hannes Trautloft) made contact with the airmen and also spoke to Lamason. (Note: The two Luftwaffe officers who went to Buchenwald were Inspector of the Day Fighters, Colonel Hannes Trautloft and his adjutant. Trautloft was about to leave the camp when captured US airman Bernard Scharf called out to him in fluent German from behind a fence. The SS guards tried to intervene, but Trautloft pointed out that he out-ranked them and made them stand back. Scharf explained that he was one of more than 160 Allied airmen imprisoned at the camp and begged Trautloft to rescue him and the other airmen. Disturbed by the event, Trautloft returned to Berlin and began the process to have the airmen transferred out of Buchenwald (Makos, pp. 316–18).) Convinced the airmen were not spies, but bona-fide airmen, Trautloft reported his findings to command.

After reading the report, an outraged Hermann Göring demanded 'at the highest level' the transfer of the airmen to Luftwaffe control. Unknown to all airmen except Lamason, their execution had been scheduled for 26 October, if they remained at Buchenwald. News of the airmen's scheduled execution had been conveyed to Lamason by a German political prisoner, Eugen Kogon, who had a reliable contact within the camp administrative area. (Note: In the book The theory and practice of hell: the German concentration camps and the system behind them, the author, Eugen Kogon, incorrectly refers to Lamason as an Australian.) Lamason discussed the information at length with Yeo-Thomas, Burney and Robert and they concluded there was little that could be done to avert the mass execution. Lamason decided not to inform the airmen, but to keep this information to himself to keep morale high and in the slight hope the Luftwaffe would intervene in time. On the night of 19 October, seven days before their scheduled execution, 156 of the 168 airmen, including Lamason, were transferred from Buchenwald to Stalag Luft III by the Luftwaffe.

Nationalities of the 168 airmen
(United States) 82 American
(United Kingdom) 48 British (Note: Although Pilot Officer S.A. Spierenburg was a Dutchman flying for the RAF, he is listed in all material as a British national.)
(Canada) 26 Canadian
(Australia) 9 Australian
(New Zealand) 2 New Zealander
(Jamaica) 1 Jamaican

Two airmen died at Buchenwald. The other ten, who were too ill to be moved with the main group, were transported to Stalag Luft III in small groups over a period of several weeks. In the two months at Buchenwald, Lamason had lost 19 kilograms (42 lbs) and had contracted diphtheria and dysentery. At Stalag Luft III, he spent a month in the infirmary recovering. In late January 1945, all Stalag Luft III POWs were force-marched to other POW camps further inside Germany. Lamason and Chapman were marched to Stalag III-A outside Luckenwalde, where they remained until liberated by the Russian army at the end of the war in Europe. Lamason and Chapman were taken to Hildesheim airfield and flown to Brussels and then on to England.

Many airmen credit their survival at Buchenwald to the leadership and determination of Lamason. Captured pilot Stratton Appleman stated that "they were very fortunate to have Lamason as their leader". Another airman, Joe Moser, stated that Lamason was a great leader whom he would have been glad to follow anywhere he asked. British pilot James Stewart described Lamason as "a wonderful unsung hero". In the book 168 Jump into Hell, Lamason was described as having single-minded determination, selflessness, cold courage and forcefulness in the face of the threat of execution by the camp authorities because he was their leader and said that Lamason quickly established himself as a legendary figure in the airmen's eyes. In the National Film Board of Canada 1994 documentary, The Lucky Ones: Allied Airmen and Buchenwald, captured pilot Tom Blackham stated that Lamason was not only the senior officer, but also their natural leader. Lamason emerged from Buchenwald with a giant reputation. In the book Destination Buchenwald, Lamason stated he felt deeply honoured to have been the senior officer during the Buchenwald period.

== Aftermath and later life ==
Following their liberation and return to England, Lamason was asked to consider commanding one of the Okinawa squadrons for the final attack on Japan. However, the RNZAF refused and Lamason returned to New Zealand, arriving there the day after the atomic bomb was dropped on Hiroshima. He was discharged from the air force on 16 December 1945.

In 1946, Lamason was asked to be the lead pilot to test the flight paths for a new British airport. As part of the agreement, he was offered a farm in Berkshire. However, family said he needed to be home instead and Heathrow Airport went ahead without him. In 1948, Lamason moved to Dannevirke, a small rural community north east of Palmerston North where he acquired 406 acres and became a farmer until his retirement.

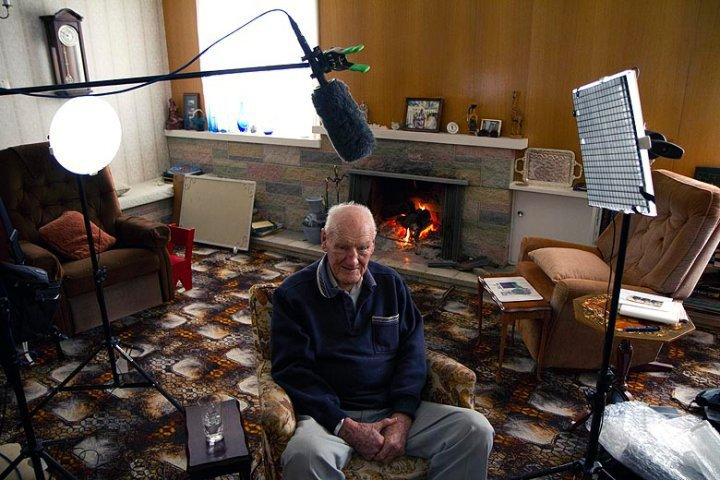
Phil Lamason being interviewed in June 2010 by Mike Dorsey for the documentary film Lost Airmen of Buchenwald.

During the 1980s and 1990s, Lamason was a regular speaker at KLB (initials for Konzentrationslager Buchenwald) Club reunions, a club formed by the Allied airmen while detained in Buchenwald. Lamason was also a member of the Caterpillar Club, an informal association of people who have successfully used a parachute to bail out of a disabled aircraft.

Lamason hid the fact for 39 years that the order for the airmen's execution was given and scheduled for 26 October 1944, first mentioning it at a Canadian POW convention in Hamilton in 1983. In May 1987, the New Zealand Government in Wellington approved a fund to compensate servicemen held in German concentration camps and Lamason was awarded $13,000. However, Lamason was never formally honoured by his homeland for his leading role in saving the lives of the Allied airmen at Buchenwald.

In 1994, the National Film Board of Canada released a documentary movie titled, “The Lucky Ones: Allied Airmen and Buchenwald”, in which former Allied airmen recounted their personal and collective stories of life before, during and after Buchenwald. Lamason was interviewed and mentioned throughout the documentary.

Lamason was portrayed in the History Channel's 2004 documentary "Shot from the Sky", about the real life saga of B-17 pilot Roy Allen, one of the captured airmen taken to Buchenwald.

In April 2005, Lamason, then 86, recollected the events of Buchenwald on TV New Zealand. In June 2010, Lamason, then 91, was interviewed again about his experience at Buchenwald by Mike Dorsey. This and other interviews with Lamason are featured in Dorsey's 2011 documentary film titled, Lost Airmen of Buchenwald, which tells the complete story of the 168 Allied airmen who were sent to Buchenwald, including Lamason. Mike Dorsey said Lamason remained scarred by his experiences to the extent that Dorsey said “I have a feeling that Lamason, to put it in a word, has no time for the Germans.”

Lamason died at his home on 19 May 2012, on the farm outside Dannevirke where he had lived for over 60 years. He was 93 and at the time of his death, survived by two sons and two daughters. He was predeceased by his wife, Joan (née Hopkins), who died in 2007, and was buried with her at Mangatera Cemetery.

In November 2015, it was announced that a book recounting and honouring Lamason's life would be written by Waipukurau author Hilary Pedersen by September 2018 (what would have been Lamason's 100th birthday). The book titled, I Would Not Step Back ... The Phil Lamason Story was launched at Dannevirke in February 2018.

== See also ==
- The Boys of Buchenwald – documentary film about the child survivors of Buchenwald concentration camp
- Karl and Ilse Koch; The first Commandant of Buchenwald and his wife, also known as the Bitch of Buchenwald
- Number of deaths in Buchenwald
