= Christopher Burney =

British SOE officer (1917–1980)

Christopher Burney MBE
- Born: 16 June 1917
- Died: 19 December 1980 (aged 63)
- Military career
- Allegiance: United Kingdom
- Branch: British Army
- Rank: Lieutenant
- Unit: Special Operations Executive
- Conflicts: World War II; French Resistance

Christopher Arthur Geoffrey Burney MBE (16 June 1917 – 18 December 1980) was an upper-class Englishman who served in the Special Operations Executive (SOE) during World War II.

== Biography ==
In 1941, Pierre de Vomécourt organized AUTOGYRO, one of the first resistance networks of Section F of the Special Operations Executive. Among de Vomécourt's recruits were Georges Bégué, the first SOE agent ever to be parachuted into France, who was assigned as the wireless operator; Noel Fernand Raoul Burdeyron (real name: Norman F. Burley); and Mathilde Carre.

Lack of money, weapons, and personnel, along with spotty communications with London meant that AUTOGYRO accomplished little. In frustration, Burdeyron/Burley singlehandedly derailed a German supply train by pulling up a rail, AUTOGYRO's only successful attack, causing considerable German casualties. Impressed, SOE decided to send Burdeyron some assistance. They recruited Christopher Burney, a lieutenant in the British Army and a trained commando, who had lived in France and spoke idiomatic French without an accent. On 30 May 1942, under the code name "Charles", he was inserted by parachute into France along with William Grover-Williams, on a different mission under the code name "Sebastian".

After being blind-dropped into the French countryside, Burney made his way to his rendezvous with Burdeyron. Circling the building, he spotted several suspicious men watching from various positions. He immediately concluded that his rendezvous had been blown and AUTOGYRO betrayed (it had – Mathilde Carre was in fact, a double agent). He quietly left, and never attempted any further contact with Burdeyron or de Vomécourt.

Burney then tried to create his own network, but after eleven weeks learned that the Abwehr was passing around a circular warning bank clerks, hotel clerks, and others to be on the lookout for a man named "Charles" who was asking strange questions, and offering a reward for tips on his whereabouts. The circular contained a good description of Burney who, tall and blonde, was very conspicuous in Normandy. Deciding he had done all he could, he planned his escape over the Pyrenees to Spain and back to England. Grover-Williams offered his help, and Burney met with him several times to organize the escape, but on the morning he was to meet Grover-Williams for the last time, Burney was surprised in his sleep by Abwehr agents who had been tipped off by a hotel clerk familiar with the circular.

The Germans locked him up, first in Fresnes prison, for 15 months of solitary confinement, then in Buchenwald concentration camp, where he arrived on 29 January 1944. While at Buchenwald, Burney would meet F.F.E. Yeo-Thomas and also subsequently meet Phil Lamason, the senior officer in charge of 168 allied airmen and would help - at great risk - with their transfer to a POW camp.

Freed in 1945, he worked after the war for the newly formed United Nations, helping to commission their building in New York City. When Dutch diplomat and UN Assistant Secretary-General Adrian Pelt was posted from 1949 to 1951 in the Franco-British UN Trust Territory of Libya as UN Commissioner for Libyan Independence, Burney was assigned as his assistant. In the 1950s, banking magnate Siegmund Warburg recruited him as a manager for the British and French Bank.

Burney's younger brother, Roger Burney, was one of two British officers killed on 18 February 1942 when the French submarine Surcouf was mysteriously sunk in the Caribbean.

In 1966, Frank Kermode, somewhat controversially, included Burney's experience of time passing in Solitary Confinement in his own major critical work of Western experience of passing time in The Sense of an Ending.

== Bibliography ==
- The Dungeon Democracy, 1946, Burney's controversial account of life in Buchenwald
- Solitary Confinement, 1951, his account of 15 months in Fresnes Prison
- Descent from Ararat, 1962, an existentialist fable
