= Allied airmen at Buchenwald concentration camp =

Allied airmen held prisoner at Buchenwald Concentration Camp in 1944

Between 20 August and 19 October 1944, 168 Allied airmen were held prisoner at Buchenwald concentration camp. Colloquially, they described themselves as the KLB Club (from German: Konzentrationslager Buchenwald). Of them, 166 airmen survived Buchenwald, while two died of sickness at the camp.

== Background ==
As Allied air forces took control of the skies over Europe in the summer of 1944, Adolf Hitler ordered the immediate execution of Allied flyers accused of committing certain acts. The most common act was to be captured in civilian clothing or without their dog tags by the Gestapo or secret police. These airmen had been shot down over France, Belgium, and the Netherlands and were turned over German authorities, often by double agents within the French Resistance, while attempting to reach England along escape routes such as the Comet and Pat lines. The double agent Jacques Desoubrie betrayed a significant number of these Allied airmen to the German authorities.

German authorities labeled the captured airmen Terrorflieger—"terror flyers"—and subject to summary judgement. The German Foreign Office advised that the airmen not be classified as prisoners of war (POWs) and thus not protected from execution. The Gestapo and security police accused the airmen of being criminals and spies. German authorities transported 168 allied airmen by train in overcrowded cattle cars from Fresnes Prison outside Paris to Buchenwald concentration camp. These airmen included nationals of Great Britain, the United States, Australia, Canada, New Zealand, and Jamaica. After five days in the boxcars, they arrived at Buchenwald on 20 August 1944.

== Buchenwald ==
Nationalities of the 168 airmen
(United States) 82 American
(United Kingdom) 48 British
(Canada) 26 Canadian
(Australia) 9 Australian
(New Zealand) 2 New Zealander
(Jamaica) 1 Jamaican

Buchenwald was a forced labour camp of about 60,000 inmates of mainly Russian POWs, but also common criminals; religious prisoners, including Jews; and various political prisoners from Germany, France, Poland, and Czechoslovakia. For the first three weeks at Buchenwald, the prisoners were totally shaven, denied shoes, and forced to sleep outside without shelter in one of Buchenwald's sub-camps, known as "Little Camp". Most airmen doubted they would ever get out of Buchenwald because their documents were stamped with the acronym "DIKAL" (Darf in kein anderes Lager), or "allowed in no other camp". After the war some of the airmen recounted that officers of the German Air Force had visited Buchenwald a few days after an Allied air raid on Weimar in late August 1944 to assess the damage inflicted upon the armament factory adjacent to the camp. According to these recollections the German officers talked to the airmen and saw that they were transferred to the POW camp. Years later veterans identified Hannes Trautloft from photos as one of the officers and credited him with saving their lives. Until now it was not possible to verify this story with archival records. In his war diary Trautloft does not mention the events. The Gedenkstätte Buchenwald stated that a visit by Trautloft or other officers might have happened and that this might have influenced the decision making process of what to do with the airmen. However, there might have been no connection whatsoever, because the decisions were not made by a single officer like Trautloft.

To address the constant stress, long appells (roll calls), boredom, insecurity and apprehension, it was decided amongst the 168 airmen to hold formal meetings to give them a sense of purpose and order. Thus, the exclusive KLB Club came into existence with several chapters; Canada, United States, Great Britain, and Australia-New Zealand. Elected representatives of each nationality held separate meetings to collate the previously scattered efforts of those who had proposed address lists, meetings after the war and other pursuits. The meetings at Buchenwald displayed the 168 airmen's militariness and solidarity, forming a bond that brings them together more than 60 years after the liberation of Buchenwald.

At one meeting, it was agreed to design a club pin. The winning design, put forward by Bob Taylor from Great Britain, showed a naked, winged foot, symbolising the airmen's barefoot condition while in the concentration camp. The foot is chained to a ball bearing the letters KLB, with the whole mounted on a white star, which was the crest of the Allied invasion forces. Canadian airman, William Arthur “Willie” Waldram, also wrote the poem titled, A Reflection, about Buchenwald (see below). On the night of 19 October, 156 of the 168 airmen were transferred from Buchenwald to Stalag Luft III by the Luftwaffe. Two airmen died from sickness at Buchenwald, while the remaining 10 were transported in small groups, over a period of several weeks.

In the book 168 Jump Into Hell, the purpose of the KLB Club was described as being to perpetuate the comradeship already shown by the flying personnel of Great Britain, Australia, New Zealand, United States and Canada, by the interchanging of pamphlets, ideas and visits. More than 30 years later, in 1979, four Canadian KLB members made the first serious attempt to trace all club members. At that time, of the original 168 members, only 28 had not been located or accounted for.. All have now been traced, and information about each individual airman, including service history, is now being posted at www.buchenwaldairmen.info. Stanley Albert Booker, the last survivor of the KLB Club, died in January, 2025.

== Members ==
Nationality	Name	Buchenwald number	Notes
New Zealander	Cullen, Malcolm Ford	78388	Died 5 September 2002.
	Lamason, Phillip (Phil) John	78407	Senior officer (Squadron leader) at Buchenwald concentration camp Interviewed in the 1994 NFBC documentary, Buchenwald: The Lucky Ones. Portrayed in the History Channel's 2004 documentary Shot from the Sky. Died 19 May 2012.
Australian	Fairclough, Mervyn James	78427	Died July 1964, Katanning Western Australia.
	Gwilliam, James (Jim) Percival	78423	Died 11 August 2002.
	Johnston, Eric Lyle	78421	Interviewed in the 1994 NFBC documentary, Buchenwald: The Lucky Ones. Died 25 August 2003.
	Light, Kevin William	78381	Died 19 July 2008.
	Malcolm, Thomas (Tom) Alexander	78379	Died 15 February 2002.
	Mills, Keith Cyril	78405	Died February 2012, Mackay, Queensland
	Mills, Robert (Bob) Neil	78426	Died 8 August 1990
	Perry, Raymond (Ray) Walter	78356	Died 26 November 1997
	Whellum, Lesley (Les) Keith	78442	Died 23 May 2003
Jamaican	Guilfoyle, Michael (Mike) A.	78393	Not located after World War II, but a Captain Michael Guilfoyle flew for Air Jamaica in 1966
Canadian	Atkins, Harold	78440	Only Canadian KLB member not located after World War II
	Bastable, Harry	78378	Died 23 September 2007
	Clark, Don	78364	Died 30 April 1988
	Crawford, John	78406	Died
	Comptom, G.A. Edward	78434	Died
	Carter-Edwards, Ed	78361	Interviewed in the 1994 NFBC documentary, Buchenwald: The Lucky Ones. Died 22 February 2017 in Ontario, Canada.
	Fulsher, Frederick W.	78418	Deceased
	Gibson, William (Bill) R.	78394	Addressed the Canadian Standing Committee on Veterans Affairs about Buchenwald, in February 2000. Deceased.
	Grenon, Leon (Leo) T.	78438	Died September 1994
	Harvie, John D.	78412	Co-wrote the book "Missing in Action" about Buchenwald. Died 5 January 2011.
	Head, Les	78430	
	Hetherington, Stanley (Stan)	78436	Died 16 October 2005 in Sarnia, Ontario, Canada
	High, Dave	78422	Interviewed in the 1994 NFBC documentary, Buchenwald: The Lucky Ones
	Hodgson, Thomas (Tommy) R.	78424	Deceased
	Hoffman, Charles Richard (Dick)	78429	Deceased
	Kinnis, Arthur (Art) G.	78391	Co-wrote the book 168 Jump into Hell about Buchenwald. Died 20 January 2011 in Victoria, British Columbia.
	Leslie, Donald (Don) E.	78404	Interviewed in the History Channel's 2004 documentary Shot from the Sky about Buchenwald
	McClenaghan, J. Ralph	78373	Deceased
	Prudham, James E. (Pep)	78374	Died 2000 in Scarbrough Ontario
	Scullion, Patrick	78395	Deceased
	Shepherd, Ernest G.	78372	Deceased
	Smith, James A.	78428	Died 29 July 2013
	Sonshine, E.R. (Joseph)	78343	Died 13 March 2005 in Toronto, Ontario, Canada
	Waldram, William Arthur (Willie)	78402	Wrote the poem, "A Reflection", about KLB and Buchenwald. Deceased.
	Watson, Earl Carruthers	78431	Deceased
	Willis, Calvin E.	78342	
British	Angus, Jack W.	78390	Not located after World War II
	Barham, Leonard P.	78432	Not located after World War II
	Baxter, Stuart	78384	Deceased
	Bennett, Geoffery	78344	Teacher at Caludon Castle School Coventry
	Blackham, Thomas Henry (Tom)	78380	Senior British officer (flight lieutenant) at Buchenwald. President of the KLB Club Great Britain chapter. Interviewed in the 1994 NFBC documentary, Buchenwald: The Lucky Ones. Died 6 April 2003.
	Booker, Stanley Albert	78370	Co-wrote the book 168 Jump into Hell about Buchenwald
	Bryden, Robert (Bob)	78365	
	Chapman, E.W. (Ken)	78409	Died 29 June 2008 in Sussex
	Chinn, Albert J.	78433	Not located after World War II
	Clark, John	78385	Not located after World War II
	Davis, Eric	78346	Deceased
	Dowdeswell, Philip	78410	Not located after World War II
	Eagle, Douglas	78403	Deceased
	Fernandez, John Joseph	78352	Died December 1992
	Gould, Terrance	78386	Not located after World War II
	Harper, Robert	78414	Not located after World War II
	Heggarty, Patrick W.	78420	
	Hemmens, Philip D.	78383	Died in Buchenwald from septic anemia, rheumatic fever and pneumonia on 18 October 1944
	Hughes, Ronald R.	78347	
	Jackson, Edgar	78392	Deceased
	Jordin, Douglas F.	78341	Not located after World War II
	Joyce, Reg W.	78401	
	Kay, William	78400	
	Leverington, Ronald (Ron) L.	78382	Still alive in November 2011
	Lucas, Lewis J.	78389	
	MacPherson, Alexander J.	78435	Not located after World War II
	Marshall, Wilfred	78417	Not located after World War II
	Measures, Derek K.	78413	Deceased
	Mutter, Neville E.S.	78375	Died March 2001
	Nuttall, Cyril Worsley	78366	Died November 1990
	Osselton, John N.	78371	Not located after World War II
	Peirson, Frank	78362	
	Percy, Douglas C.	78411	Deceased
	Phelps, Edward K.	78419	
	Reid, John D.	78387	Not located after World War II
	Robb, Ian A.	78415	
	Rowe, Andrew	78408	Not located after World War II
	Salt, Frank	78345	Not located after World War II
	Sharratt, William S.	78397	After the war returned to Lancashire where he married Irene Withington. They had two sons, John and Ian. He re-joined the Police Force and served for over 30 years. Died in April 1973 of a heart attack at the age of 55.
	Spierenburg, Splinter Adolph (Dutch)	78443	Dutchman flying for the RAF. Spoke fluent German and regularly acted as an interpreter for Lamason. Not located after World War II, but a P/O Splinter Adolphe Spierenburg (born 17 May 1920 in the Hague) who joined the RAF in 1942, shot down over France in May 1944, and was subsequently sent to a concentration camp, died April 1997, in England.
	Stewart, James (Jim) A.	78416	Interviewed in the 1994 NFBC documentary, Buchenwald: The Lucky Ones
	Taylor, Peter D.	78425	
	Taylor, Ralph John (Bob)	78376	Designed the KLB Club pin. Interviewed in the 1994 NFBC documentary, Buchenwald: The Lucky Ones.
	Vinecombe, Frederick S.	78377	Celebrated his 105th birthday in 2019, alive and well in 2020
	Ward, John D.	78396	Not located after World War II
	Watmough, George F.	78439	Not located after World War II
	Wesley, Laurice	78399	Not located after World War II
	Williams, Llewelyn	78437	Not located after World War II
American	Alexander, William	78287	Deceased
	Allen, Roy	78357	Co-wrote the book, In the Shadows of War about Buchenwald. Main character in the History Channel's 2004 documentary Shot from the Sky. Died 1991.
	Appleman, Stratton M.	78314	Deceased
	Bauder, Warren F.	78196	Interviewed in the History Channel's 2004 documentary Shot from the Sky about Buchenwald
	Beck, Levitt C.	78286	Died in Buchenwald from purulent pleurisy on the evening of 29 November 1944
	Bedford, Richard L.	78283	
	Bowan, Chasten (Chas) E.	78336	Interviewed in the History Channel's 2004 documentary Shot from the Sky about Buchenwald. Died 30 December 2016.
	Brown, Robert W.	78295	
	Bozarth, James Walter	78340	Deceased
	Carr, Frederick W.	78318	Deceased
	Chalot, John A.	78278	
	Chapman, Park	78284	Deceased
	Chessir, Douglas	78285	
	Coats, Basil A.	78308	Deceased
	Coffman, J.D.	78319	
	Cowan, Frank Kirby	78271	Died 23 December 2009
	Crouch, Marshall Jr. E.	78277	Deceased
	Dauteul, Donat F.	78324	
	Dearey, Ralph W.	78316	Deceased
	Denaro, Joe	78269	
	Duncan, James H.	78300	Deceased
	Edge, William L.	78267	Died 1996
	Fix, Karl Ellsworth	78313	Deceased
	Fore, James W.	78349	
	Freeman, Elmer (James) C.	78359	Died 2 August 2012, Niceville, Florida
	Friel, Edward J.	78309	
	Granberry, William L.	78312	Deceased
	Hanson, John P.	78280	Not located after World War II
	Hastin, James (Jim) D.	78354	Interviewed in the 1994 NFBC documentary, Buchenwald: The Lucky Ones. Died February 2005.
	Heimerman, Lawrence A.	78334	Deceased
	Hilding, Russ D.	78326	Died November 7, 2021, age 100. A 2Lt. in the USAAF, he was the last surviving Buchenwald Airman. Lawrence Cosentino (13 October 2022), 'UGH, BUCHENWALD' To hell and back: The story of Buchenwald Airman Russell Hilding (tribute), Lansing City Pulse
	Hoffman, Robert B.	78350	Deceased
	Horwege, Glenn L.	78281	Deceased
	Horrigan, Roy J.	78321	
	Hunter, Harry F.	78337	
	Johnson, Robert T.	78272	
	King, Myles A.	78279	
	Larson, Merle E.	78363	Senior US officer (captain) at Buchenwald. Died 1998.
	Little, Bruce S.	78301	
	Ludwig, Everett F.	78339	Deceased
	McClenaghan, J. Ralph	78348	Deceased
	Martini, Frederic C	78299	Active in KLB, VFW, POW groups. Died 1995 in Bradenton, FL.
	Masters, Lovell O.	78290	Deceased
	Mauk, William E.	78298	Deceased
	McLaughlin, Daniel (Whitey) G.	78338	
	Mikel, George	78266	Deceased
	Mitchell, Gerald E.	78307	
	Moser, Joseph (Joe)	78369	Interviewed in the 1994 NFBC documentary, Buchenwald: The Lucky Ones. Co-wrote the book A fighter pilot in Buchenwald about Buchenwald. Interviewed in the History Channel's 2004 documentary Shot from the Sky about Buchenwald. Died 2 December 2015 in Ferndale, Washington.
	Pacha, Arthur M.	78288	
	Paxton, S. Keith	78320	
	Pecus, Steve	78315	Deceased
	Pederson, J.W. (Charles)	78351	Died 23 July 1986
	Pennel, Sam	78289	Deceased
	Petrich, Michael R.	78325	Interviewed in the History Channel's 2004 documentary Shot from the Sky about Buchenwald. Died 23 April 2006 (Long Beach, California).
	Phelps, Byron F.	78331	Deceased 10 January 2012
	Pelletier, Arthur J.	78335	
	Powell, William (Bill)	78296	Original president of the US chapter. Interviewed in the 1994 NFBC documentary, Buchenwald: The Lucky Ones. Died 10 September 1997 (Bella Vista, Arizona).
	Reynolds, Leo J.	78292	
	Richey, G. Thomas	78317	Died 2 June 2004
	Ritter, Edwin W.	78311	Spoke Polish. Deceased.
	Robertson, Charles William	78327	Died 25 October 2005
	Rynerd, William H.	78358	
	Salo, Laurie H.	78270	Deceased
	Smith, James W.	78323	Deceased
	Scharf, Bernard T.	78353	Spoke German. Not located after World War II.
	Scott, George W.	78330	Not located after World War II
	Shearer, Donald R.	78332	Died 21 February 2019
	Stralka, Paul A.	78268	Deceased
	Suddock, Dwight E.	78273	Deceased
	Sypher, Leroy Henry	78276	Deceased 4 February 2006
	Thompson, Warren A.	78329	
	Vance, Ira E.	78360	Deceased
	Vallee, Edward	78293	Deceased
	Vincent, Edwin H.	78310	Deceased
	Vratney, Frank	78328	Spoke Czech or Slovak
	Ward, Robert	78355	
	Watson, John Paul	78333	
	Williams, W.J.	78294	
	Wilson, Paul J.	78297	Deceased
	Wojnick, Ray J.	78367	Deceased
	Zander, Arthur E.	78368	Died 15 July 2009
	Zeiser, James	78322	Deceased

== Bibliography ==
- Burgess, Colin (1995), Destination Buchenwald, Kenthurst, NSW: Kangaroo Press, ISBN 0-86417-733-X, OCLC 35019954.
- Kinnis, Arthur; Booker, Stanley (1999), 168 Jump Into Hell, Victoria, BC, ISBN 0-9684198-0-1, OCLC 43390724.
- Moser, Joseph; Baron, Gerald (2009), A fighter pilot in Buchenwald, Bellingham, WA: Edens Veil, ISBN 978-0-615-22111-3, OCLC 311551716.
- Martini, Frederic H (2017). Betrayed; Secrecy, Lies, and Consequences. ISBN 978-0996636353
