= SOE F Section Codenames & Aliases =

This is an incomplete list detailing the codenames and aliases used by F Section agents of the Special Operations Executive.

== A ==
- Achille - Roland Dowlen
- ACROBAT - John Starr
- ACTOR - Roger Landes
- Adele - Lisé de Baissac
- ADMINISTRATOR - John Allsop
- Agrippa - Nicholas Allington
- Alain - Georges Duboudin
- Alaric - Benjamin Aptaker
- Alcide - William Savy
- Alec - Adolphe Rabinovitch
- Alfred - Raymond Aubin
- Alice - Cecily Lefort
- ALMOND - Henry Newton
- ALMONER - Vera Leigh
- Alonce - John Allsop
- Alvar - René Bichelot
- Ambroise - Denise Bloch
- Annette - Yvonne Cormeau
- ANTAGONIST - Fred Agee
- Antoine - Philippe de Vomécourt
- Antonin - Fred Agee
- APOTHECARY - Jean-Paul Archambault
- Archambaud - Gilbert Norman
- ARCHDEACON - Frank Pickersgill
- Aristide - Roger Landes
- Arnaud - Adolphe Rabinovitch
- ARTIST - Lisé de Baissac
- Artus - Alfred Newton
- Astre - Roland Alexandre
- AUDITOR - Raymond Aubin
- Auguste - Henry Newton
- AUTHOR - Harry Peulevé
- AUTOGIRO - Pierre de Vomécourt
- AVENGER - Nicholas Allington

== B ==
- Bachelier, Raymond - René Bichelot
- BAGPIPER - René Bichelot
- Baker, Nora - Noor Inayat Khan
- BANDIT - Robert George Bruhl
- BARBER - Marcel Rousset
- Barberousse - Albert Benstead
- BARGEE - Adolphe Rabinovitch
- Barnabé - Robert George Bruhl
- BARNSTORMER - Joe Benoit
- Basil - Peter Lake
- Bastien - Marcel Clech
- Bavelan, Aline - Alix D'Unienville
- BEADLE - Ralph Beauclerk
- Beauvalais, René Charles - Ralph Beauclerk
- BEGGAR - Maurice Basset
- BENEFACTRESS - Muriel Byck
- BERBERIO - Blanche Charlet
- Bernard, André Jean - André Bloch
- Bernier, Jeanne - Yvonne Baseden
- Bertrand - Frank Pickersgill
- Billet - Wilhelm Holst
- BILLSTICKER - Raphaël Beugnon
- BIOLOGIST - Robert Byerly
- BISHOP - Marcus Bloom
- Blanche - Sonya Butt
- BLOUSE - Lilian Rolfe
- Bob - John Starr
- BOMBPROOF - Georges Bégué
- BORER - Eugène Bec
- Boris - Joe Benoit
- Bourdet, René Maurice - Robert Boiteux
- Bouville, Jeannette - Lisé de Baissac
- Boyd, Alan George - André Bloch
- Brémontier, Roger - Robert Benoist
- BRICKLAYER - France Antelme
- Brisse, Irène - Lisé de Baissac
- BUCCANEER - Albert Benstead
- BURGLAR - Alcide Beauregard
- BURSAR - Yvonne Baseden
- BUTCHER - Gilbert Norman
- BUTLER - Jean Bouguennec

== C ==
- Cardinal- FWM Reeve
- CAMELIA - Victor Hazan
- Camille - Virginia Hall
- CAMISOLE - Ralph Beauclerk
- Carlier, Lucienne Suzanne - Nancy Wake
- Casimir - Ralph Beauclerk
- CATALPHA - Adolphe Rabinovitch
- Célestin - Brian Stonehouse
- Chambrun, Pierre - Peter Churchill
- CHANCELLOR - George Millar
- CHAPLAIN - Diana Rowden
- Charles - Christopher Burney
- Chauvet, Pierre Marc - Peter Churchill
- Chauvigny, Yvonne Marie Yolande - Yolande Beekman
- CHEMIST - James Amps
- Chevalier, Henri - Harry Peulevé
- Chevalier, Jacques - Jack Agazarian
- Chico - Jean-Paul Archambault
- Christiane - Blanche Charlet
- Claire - Julienne Aisner
- Claudine - Mary Katherine Herbert
- Clement - Philippe Liewer
- CLOAK - Roger Landes
- Clothaire - Bob Maloubier
- CLOTHIER - Odette Sansom
- Colette - Anne-Marie Walters
- COMPOSITOR - Julienne Aisner
- de Courcelles, Philippe Robert - Philippe de Vomécourt
- CRINOLINE - Denise Bloch
- Cyrano - Alcide Beauregard

== D ==
- DANCER - Madeleine Damerment
- David - Claude de Baissac
- Davoust, Alice Thérèse - Anne-Marie Walters
- DEACON - Henri Gaillot
- DEAN - Eliane Plewman
- DECORATOR - Guy D'Artois
- Denis - Claude de Baissac
- Denise - Andrée Borrel
- DESIGNER - Jacqueline Nearne
- Desjardin, Guy Robert - Roméo Sabourin
- Desjardins, Françoise - Jacqueline Nearne
- Desprée, François - Francis Suttill
- DETECTIVE - Henri Sevenet
- Diane - Virginia Hall
- DICKY - Alcide Beauregard
- Didi - Eileen Nearne
- Dieudonné - Guy D'Artois
- Dieudonné - Gabriel Chartrand
- DITCHER - Albert Browne-Bartroli
- Dodkin, Kenneth - Forest Yeo-Thomas
- DONKEYMAN - Henri Frager
- Doucet, Roger François Marcel - Marcel Rousset
- DRAFTSMAN - André Bloch
- DRIVER - Georges Clément
- Dumontet, Joseph Marie Fernand - France Antelme
- Dussautoy, Martine - Madeleine Damerment
- Dusseret, Artus - Alfred Newton
- Dusseret, Hubert - Henry Newton
- Duterte, Jacqueline - Eileen Nearne

== E ==
- Élisabeth - Elizabeth Devereux-Rochester
- Edmond - Harry Peulevé
- Édouard - Georges Clément
- Émile - George Millar
- Émile - John Starr
- Eugene - Maurice Pertschuk

== F ==
- Fabre, Francine - Francine Agazarian
- FAIRY - Yvonne Cormeau
- Firmin - Robert Boiteux

== G ==
- Gaby - Eliane Plewman
- GARDENER - Robert Boiteux
- Garel, Francis - Jean Bouguennec
- Gaston - Noël Burdeyron
- Gauthier - Philippe de Vomécourt
- Gautier, Jacqueline - Yvonne Rudellat
- Genevieve - Phyllis Latour
- George I - Georges Bégué
- Georges IX - André Bloch
- George 53 - Edward Zeff
- George 60 - Marcel Cleff
- Gérard - Adolphe Rabinovitch
- Gervais - Victor Hazan
- Gilbert - Henri Déricourt
- GLAZIER - Jack Agazarian
- Gontrand - Robert Byerly
- GOWN - Muriel Byck
- GREENHEART - Alfred Newton
- GUARDIAN - Jean-Claude Guiet
- Guy - Gustave Biéler

== H ==
- HAIRDRESSER - Claude Arnault
- Hamlet - Philippe Liewer
- Hector - Maurice Southgate
- Hélène - Nancy Wake
- Henrique - Élisée Allard
- Hérault, René-Maurice - Bob Maloubier
- Hervé - Pierre Agapov
- Hilaire - Harry Peulevé
- Hilaire - George Reginald Starr
- Honoré - John Barrett
- Hugo - Raphaël Beugnon
- Hugues - Eugène Bec

== I ==
- Ignace - Henri Gaillot
- INNKEEPER - John Barrett
- Isabelle - Madeleine Latour

== J ==
- JAPONICA - Brian Stonehouse
- Jacqueline - Jacqueline Nearne
- Jean - Ernest Paul Bernard
- Jean - Harry Peulevé
- Jean-Marie - Henri Frager
- Jean-Pierre - Peter Lake
- JEWELLER - Mary Katherine Herbert
- JOCKEY - Francis Cammaerts
- José - Georges André
- Josette - Patricia O'Sullivan
- Jules - Ange Defendini
- Julien - Isidore Newman

== K ==
- KENNELMAID - Marguerite Knight
- KILT - Yolande Beekman

== L ==
- La Grande - Elizabeth Devereux-Rochester
- LAMPLIGHTER - Francine Agazarian
- La P'tite Anglaise - Violette Szabo
- Latour, Marianne - Madeleine Latour
- Latour, Phyllis (Pippa)
- Laurent - Arthur Steele
- Leblanc, Maurice - Maurice Southgate
- Lebouton, Guy - Adolphe Rabinovitch
- Léger, Maurice Alfred - Gustave Biéler
- Léonard - Roméo Sabourin
- Léopold - Marcel Rousset
- Leroy, Corinne Reine - Violette Szabo
- LIBRARIAN - Benjamin Aptaker
- LIFTMAN - Peter Lake
- Lionel - Robert Benoist
- Lise - Odette Sansom
- de Lormes, Jacques André - François Vallée
- Louise - Violette Szabo
- Lucas - Pierre de Vomécourt
- Ludovic - Maurice Basset

== M ==
- MACKINTOSH - Harry Peulevé
- Madamoiselle du Tort - Eileen Nearne
- Madeleine - Noor Inayat Khan
- Malvalle, Robert - Bob Maloubier
- Marc, Georges Marie - George William Abbott
- Marcel - Jack Agazarian
- Marguerite - Francine Agazarian
- Marguerite - Lisé de Baissac
- Marie - Virginia Hall
- Marie - Pearl Witherington
- Marie of Lyons - Virginia Hall
- Marie-France - Alix D'Unienville
- Marie-Louise - Mary Katherine Herbert
- Mariette - Yolande Beekman
- Marius - Henri Borosh
- Martial - Georges Audouard
- Martin, Gaston René - Georges Bégué
- MASON - Jean-Marie Régnier
- Mathieu - Edward Zeff
- Mathieu - Henri Sevenet
- Maulnier, Jean Charles - John Macalister
- Maurice - France Antelme
- Max - Jean Bouguennec
- McKenzie, John - Roméo Sabourin
- Mercier, Georges Robert - Georges Bégué
- MESMERIST - Gabriel Chartrand
- Meunier, Charles - John Barrett
- Michel - Peter Churchill
- Michéle - Muriel Byck
- MILKMAID - Anne-Marie Walters
- Millet, Jean - William Savy
- MILLIONAIRE - Élisée Allard
- Mimi - Yvonne Fontaine
- MOISSONEUSE - Rene Simon Ancel aka Willy Ceylan
- Mollier, Robert - Bob Maloubier
- Monique - Andrée Borrel
- Montaigne, Charles - Élisée Allard
- Morin, Guy - Gustave Biéler
- MULBERRY - George William Abbott
- MUSICIAN - Gustave Biéler
- Myrtil - Alix D'Unienville

== N ==
- Nadine - Lilian Rolfe
- Néron - Claude Arnault
- Nestor - Jacques, René Édouard, Poirier
- Nicolas - Robert Boiteux
- Nicole - Marguerite Knight
- Normand, Alfred - Alfred Newton
- Norville, Josette - Jacqueline Nearne
- NOTARY - Georges Audouard
- NURSE - Noor Inayat Khan

== O ==
- OATS - Wilhelm Holst
- Odette - Yvonne Baseden
- Odile - Lisé de Baissac
- Olive - Francis Basin
- Oscar - François Vallée
- OVERCOAT - Adolphe Rabinovitch

== P ==
- Paco - Bob Maloubier
- PALMIST - Yolande Beekman
- PARSON - François Vallée
- Paul - George William Abbott
- Paulette - Diana Rowden
- Pauline - Christine Granville
- Pauline - Pearl Witherington
- Pélican - Louis Bertheau
- Perdrigé, Daniel - Robert Benoist
- Périer, Marie-Françoise - Anne-Marie Walters
- Perkins, Martin - Maurice Pertschuk
- Perrault, Gérard - Maurice Pertschuk
- Perrin, Éliane - Eliane Plewman
- Peter - Isidore Newman
- Petit Fils - Louis Bertheau
- PETTICOAT - Eileen Nearne
- Philomène - Virginia Hall
- PHYSICIAN - Francis Suttill
- PIMENTO - Anthony Brooks
- PIONEER - Eileen Nearne
- PLAYWRIGHT - Georges Duboudin
- PLUMBER - John Macalister
- Pol, René - Roger Landes
- Ponsot, Henri - George Starr
- PORTER - Bob Maloubier
- Porthos - Jean-Marie Régnier
- PRIEST - Ange Defendini
- Prosper - Francis Suttill
- PRUNUS - Maurice Pertschuk
- PULLOVER - Roméo Sabourin
- PUNJAB - Christine Granville

== R ==
- Raoul - Peter Churchill
- Ratier, Antoine - France Antelme
- Raymond - Pierre Agapov
- RECLUSE - Lilian Rolfe
- Régnier, Jeanne-Marie - Noor Inayat Khan
- Renaud - France Antelme
- René - Jean-Marie Renaud-Dandicolle
- René - Victor Gerson
- Rodier, Claude Irène - Lilian Rolfe
- Rodolphe - Henri Sevenet
- Roger - Francis Cammaerts
- Rondeau, Juliette Thérèse - Diana Rowden
- Rose - Eileen Nearne

== S ==
- St. Paul - Philippe de Vomécourt
- SALESMAN - Philippe Liewer
- SARAFARI - Yvonne Cormeau
- Saulnier, Arthur - Arthur Steele
- SCIENTIST - Claude de Baissac
- SEAMSTRESS - Violette Szabo
- Sebastien - William Grover-Williams
- SECRETARY - Denise Bloch
- Shelley - Forest Yeo-Thomas
- SILVERSMITH - Henri Borosh
- Simone - Vera Leigh
- Simonet - Patricia O'Sullivan
- Simonet, Micheline Marcelle - Patricia O'Sullivan
- SOAPTREE - Yvonne Rudellat
- Solange - Madeleine Damerment
- SORCEROR - Roméo Sabourin
- SOVRANO - Duilio Tabanelli
- SPINDLE - Peter Churchill
- SPRUCE - Georges Duboudin
- Stanislas - Roger Landes
- STATIONER - Maurice Southgate
- Staunton, Charles Geoffrey Mark - Philippe Liewer
- STAYER - Adrien Berge
- STENOGRAPHER - Patricia O'Sullivan
- Stéphane - John Barrett
- STOCKING - Patricia O'Sullivan
- SUIT - Robert Byerly
- SURVEYOR - Roland Alexandre
- Suzanne - Yvonne Rudellat
- Sylvain - Pierre de Vomécourt
- Sylvestre - Michael Trotobas

== T ==
- Tailor, Vicky - Violette Szabo
- Tania - Sonia Olschanezky
- TAXIDERMIST - Phillip Amphlett
- TEACHER - Cecily Lefort
- Thierry, François-Yves - Forest Yeo-Thomas
- Tiburce - Albert Browne-Bartroli
- Thomas, Henry - Henri Sevenet
- TIPPET - Adrien Berge
- Tirelli - Forest Yeo-Thomas
- TOGA - Yvonne Baseden
- Tomas - James Amps
- Tournier, Marie Louise - Eileen Nearne
- Tutur - Adrien Berge
- TYPIST - Elizabeth Devereux-Rochester

== U ==
- Urbain - Marcus Bloom
- URCHIN - Francis Basin
- USHER - Jack Agazarian

== V ==
- Valentin - John Macalister
- VENTRILOQUIST - Philippe de Vomécourt
- Violette - Muriel Byck
- Virgile - Jean-Claude Guiet
- Vladimir - Maurice Louis Larcher

== W ==
- WAITER - Arthur Steele
- Watremez, Serge - George Starr
- WITCH - Nancy Wake
- WIZARD - William Savy
- WHEELWRIGHT - George Starr
- WHITEBEAM - Andrée Borrel
- White Mouse - Nancy Wake
- Williams, Danielle - Denise Bloch
- Wood, Alice - Eileen Nearne
- WRAP - Marcel Rousset

== X ==
- Xavier - Richard Henry Heslop

== Y ==
- Yvonne - Yolande Beekman
