= Elizabeth Devereux =

Elizabeth Devereux may refer to:

- Elizabeth Devereux (writer) (1833–1913)
- Elizabeth Devereux-Rochester, member of the First Aid Nursing Yeomanry

== See also ==
- Elizabeth Devereux-Rochester
