= Valençay SOE Memorial =

Franco-British monument

Coordinates: 47°10′2″N 1°33′25″E

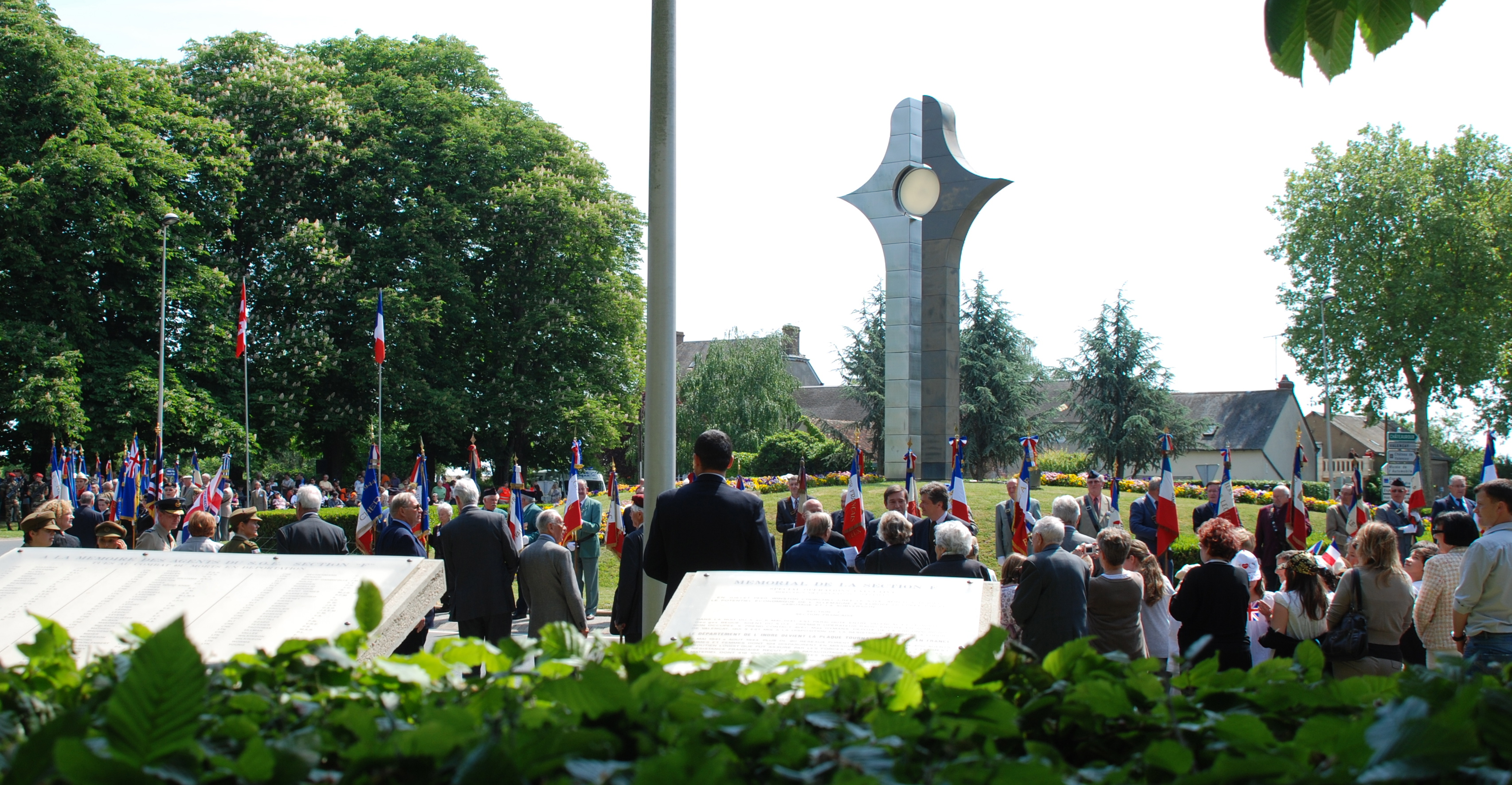
The SOE memorial in Valençay on the 20th anniversary of its unveiling

The Valençay SOE Memorial is a monument in France to the members of the Special Operations Executive F Section who died working to liberate the country during World War II.

The memorial was unveiled in the town of Valençay, in the department of Indre, on May 6, 1991, marking the fiftieth anniversary of the despatch of F Section's first agent to France.

Former SOE agents Pearl Witherington Cornioley and her husband Henri, who lived nearby, promoted the establishment of the memorial. Witherington had worked in the area as a SOE agent during World war II. The monument was designed by Elizabeth Lucas Harrison, herself a former Resistance member, who originally gave it the name "Spirit of Partnership".

Dedicated by the Minister of Veterans Affairs for France and Queen Elizabeth The Queen Mother, the memorial's Roll of Honour lists the names of the 91 men and 13 women members of the SOE who gave their lives for France's freedom.

== Valençay Memorial Roll of Honour ==
(from website: SOE and Valençay Monument)

- Jack Charles Stanmore Agazarian
- Roland Eugene Jean Alexandre
- Elisee A. L. Allard
- Phillip John Amphlett
- James Frederick Amps
- Joseph Antoine France Antelme
- John Barrett
- Alcide Beauregard
- Eugène_Bec
- Yolande Elsa Maria Beekman
- Robert Marcel Charles Benoist
- Louis Eugene Desire Bertheau
- Gustave Daniel Alfred Biéler
- Andre G. Bloch
- Denise Madeleine Bloch
- Marcus Reginald Bloom
- Andrée Raymonde Borrel
- Jean Bouguennec
- Muriel Tamara Byck
- Robert Bennett Byerly
- Eric Joseph Denis Cauchi
- Marcel Clech
- George Clement
- Ted Cyril Coppin
- Madeleine Zoe Damerment
- Marcel Enzebe Defence
- Ange Defendini
- George William Hedworth Demand
- Francois Adolphe Deniset
- Julien Theodore Joseph M. Detal
- Roland Dowlen
- André J. R. Dubois
- Émile Georges Jean Duboudin
- Phillip Francis Duclos
- David Haughton Finlayson
- Marcel Georges Florent Fox
- Henri Jacques Paul Frager
- Henri Hubert Gaillot
- Émile August Henri Garry
- Pierre Albert Hubert Geelen
- Harry Huntington Graham
- William Charles Frederick Grover-Williams
- John Trevor Hamilton
- Victor Charles Hayes
- Noor Inayat Khan
- Sidney Charles Jones
- Clement Marc Jumeau
- A. R. Landsdell
- Maurice Louis M. A. Larcher
- Marcel Mathieu René Leccia
- Jacques Paul Henri Ledoux
- Lionel Lee
- Cicely Margot Lefort
- Vera Eugenie Leigh
- M. A. Lepage
- E. Lesout
- Eugene Francis (Levene) Felangue
- John Kenneth Macalister
- Stanislaw_Makowski
- Claude Raymond Malraux
- R. M. A. Mathieu
- Andre Adrian Jules Maugenet
- James Andrew Mayer
- G. B. McBain
- James Francis George Mennesson
- Francois Gerard Michel
- Comte Jacques-Arthus Marc de Montalembert
- Pierre Louis Mulsant
- Isidore Newman
- Gilbert Maurice Norman
- Paul Baptiste Pardi
- Maurice Pertschuk
- Frank Herbert Dedrick Pickersgill
- Éliane Sophie Plewman
- Adolphe Rabinovitch
- Brian Dominic Rafferty
- Charles Rechenmann
- Jean Renaud
- Jean Renaud-Dandicolle
- Lilian Vera Rolfe
- Diana Hope Rowden
- Yvonne Claire Rudellat
- Roméo Sabourin
- Gonzague de Saint-Geniès
- Paul F. M. Sarrette
- Alexandre Schwatschko
- Henri Sevenet
- David Whytehead Sibrée
- Jean Alexandre Robert Simon
- Octave Anne Guillaume Simon
- Jack Andrew Eugene Marcel Sinclair
- Charles Milne Skepper
- V. A. Soskice
- Arthur Steele
- Francis Alfred Suttill
- Violette Reine Elizabeth Bushell Szabo
- P. R. Tessier
- Michael Alfred Raymond Trotobas
- Paul Ullman
- François M. C. Vallée
- Edward 'Teddy" Wilkinson
- George Alfred Wilkinson
- Jean Worms
- John Cuthbert Young
