= George Millar (writer) =

George Millar DSO MC

George Reid Millar DSO MC (19 September 1910 – 15 January 2005) was a Scottish journalist, soldier, author and farmer. He was awarded the Military Cross (MC) in early 1944 for escaping from Germany while a prisoner of war and making it back to England, which he wrote about in his 1946 book Horned Pigeon.

Millar was awarded the Distinguished Service Order (DSO) and the French Légion d'Honneur and the Croix de Guerre avec Palmes for his service as an SOE officer in France in 1944. He recorded his experiences fighting behind the lines with the local Resistance in his 1945 book Maquis; this book, his most well-known, belongs with others written by British servicemen who fought behind enemy lines including Ill Met by Moonlight by W. Stanley Moss, Eastern Approaches by Fitzroy Maclean and Seven Pillars of Wisdom by T. E. Lawrence.

== Early life ==
Millar was born at Bog Hall in Baldernock, Stirlingshire, the younger son of Thomas Andrew Millar. Millar's father was a self-made architect and builder; his mother's family owned property in Glasgow. His father died when he was 11 years old.

Millar, known as "Josh", was educated at Loretto School. He showed his courage and independence when he joined his boarding school aged 12 when he fought off the bullying of a 17-year-old student, by kicking him in the testicles then kicking him in the head, skills the SOE would later refine but which the school found abhorent. While at school he was happily initiated into fox hunting which became a lifelong passion. Between school and university he spent some formative months in France.

He read architecture at St John's College, Cambridge, achieving a first in his prelims but a third in his finals.

== Journalist ==
Millar practised as an architect for a short period after graduating, but decided to become a journalist in 1932, starting with a newspaper in Glasgow. He worked as an ordinary seaman on a freighter for four months and tried his hand at writing film scripts. He moved to The Daily Telegraph in 1936. After managing to befriend an officer on the yacht Nahlin, chartered by King Edward VIII in 1936 to tour the coast of Dalmatia, he breakfasted with the King and the ship's captain the next day. He published an account of the meeting, obtaining a scoop which led to the offer of a job at the Daily Express, where he came to know Lord Beaverbrook.

He married Annette Rose Forsyth (née Stockwell) in December 1937. She was the daughter of Brigadier-General Clifton Inglis Stockwell, and was previously married to Michael Noel Forsyth.

Millar joined Alan Moorehead and Geoffrey Cox as Paris correspondents of the Daily Express shortly before the outbreak of the Second World War. He covered the Battle of France as a war correspondent with the French Army, and was the last Express journalist in Paris before escaping back to England in June 1940 via Bordeaux. His wife drove an ambulance at the front with the Mechanised Transport Corps, and made her own way back to England.

== Soldier ==
Millar enlisted in the London Scottish regiment before becoming an officer in the Rifle Brigade. Beaverbrook continued to pay him half his Express salary while he was in the army. His second published book Horned Pigeon tells of his service in the 1st Battalion the Rifle Brigade in North Africa. As a second lieutenant, he was in command of a scout platoon of Bren gun carriers and motorcyclists. He had an uncomfortable time with the second in command of his battalion Major Vic Turner. His scout platoon was overrun by the advancing German forces at Gazala in the Libyan desert in June 1942, and Millar suffered light wounds. For a time he and some of his platoon evaded the Germans but eventually he was captured and briefly brought in front of Erwin Rommel himself.

He was handed over to the Italian army who took detained him at the prisoner of war camp Campo 66 in the Padula Monastery in Capua. After a number of escape attempts, and his dealings with the local Italian black market came to light, he was moved to Campo 5 at Gavi, a fortress north of Genoa used as a high-security PoW camp, where, like Colditz, the "escapers" were confined. One of his fellow inmates was David Stirling, who had established the SAS.

After the Italian surrender, the Allied prisoners were entrained for Germany in September 1943. Millar and a companion, Wally Binns, jumped from the train in Germany and made their way from Munich to Strasbourg, where they were separated. Millar continued to Paris and then Lyon. While in the south of France, he was found by the SOE section run by Richard Heslop and Elizabeth Devereux-Rochester. He volunteered to stay in France and fight with the Resistance. When Heslop refused, Millar asked Heslop to recommend him to SOE for the future. Finally, after more than three months on the run, made it across the Pyrenees and over the Spanish border to Barcelona in December 1943. He was awarded the Military Cross for his escape.

Back in London, he found his wife had moved on to a new relationship, and Millar befriended Isabel Beatriz Hardwell, daughter of the diplomat Montague Bentley Talbot Paske Smith (de:Montague Bentley Talbot Paske Smith) and then still the wife of Charles George Hardwell.

He was debriefed by MI5 and MI9, and then pulled strings to get into F Section of SOE (his elder brother was in MI6). He was prepared for a return to France by Vera Atkins and Maurice Buckmaster among others. He was promoted to captain, and parachuted into the Besançon area of eastern France a few days before D-Day to establish a sabotage unit codenamed "Chancellor". His own codename was "Emile". He quickly made links with the local Resistance, including Georges Molle, and caused disruption to the French railways, hindering the mobility of the German forces and distracting them from the invasion. For this work, he was awarded the Distinguished Service Order (DSO) by the British and the Légion d'Honneur and the Croix de Guerre avec Palmes by the French.

== Author ==
He returned to England three months later when the US Army pushed the Germans out of that part of France. He took a month's leave, rented a cottage in the country, and wrote the manuscript of Maquis, the nickname of the French Resistance. The book was cleared for publication in 1945. In an immediate and vivid account, he drew on his journalistic skills to describe life living in the woods with the Maquis, various sabotage missions against the railways and trying to organise the villages before liberation by the Americans. Millar considered this work a failure, but it received good reviews and Charles de Gaulle privately complimented him on it.

Maquis sold well and was followed by Horned Pigeon (1946) which was based on "prolific notes I had dictated ... to a shorthand typist, during the month's leave following my escape". The second book "was, if anything, more successful than the first".

Millar and Isabel divorced their previous spouses, and they married in 1946. He bought a Looe lugger Truant and sailed with Isabel to Greece on an extended honeymoon. This journey was recorded in Isabel and the Sea (1948). In Road to Resistance (1979) he records that while their boat was in Paris he received a summons from General Charles de Gaulle who had read Maquis and had taken the trouble on a trip in the area to detour to the village of Vieilley where Millar had been based.

== Farmer ==
After the war, Millar and his wife became cattle farmers at Sydling Court, near Dorchester. Millar continued to write, recording his yachting holidays as travel books.

His second wife did not recover consciousness after a car accident in 1989, and died in 1990. He retired from the farm to a house in Bridport, and died at Warmwell House in Dorchester in 2005. He had no children.

An annual prize in his honour is awarded at Bridport literary festival.

Millar's literary archive is held at the National Library of Scotland.

== Written works ==
- War autobiography
  - Maquis (William Heinemann, 1945) – covering June to October 1944 (published in the US 1946 as Waiting in the Night; A Story of the Maquis, Told By One of Its Leaders. French title: Un anglais dans le maquis.)
  - Horned Pigeon (William Heinemann, 1946) – covering 1940–44
  - Road to Resistance (The Bodley Head, 1979) – covering 1910–46
- Travel autobiography
  - Isabel and the Sea (William Heinemann, 1948) – sailing Truant through France by canal to Greece in 1946
  - A White Boat from England (William Heinemann, 1951) – subsequent sailing holidays in the sloop Serica from England via western France, Spain, Portugal, Morocco and the Balearic Islands to the south of France Full text at Archive.org
  - Oyster River (Dovecote, 1963) – sailing holiday on Amokura in the Gulf of Morbihan in Brittany
- Other works
  - My Past Was an Evil River (William Heinemann, 1946) – novel of American occupation of Germany during World War II
  - Through the Unicorn Gates (William Heinemann, 1950) – novel
  - Siesta (William Heinemann, 1953) – novel about the painter Henry Eldon
  - Orellana Discovers the Amazon (William Heinemann, 1954) (published in the US as A Crossbowman's Story of the First Exploration of the Amazon)
  - Horseman: Memoirs of Captain J. H. Marshall (The Bodley Head, 1970) – reminiscences of his friend and neighbour, including Marshall's experiences as a cavalryman, a fox hunter and horse trainer.
  - The Bruneval Raid. Flashpoint of the Radar War (The Bodley Head, 1974) Operation Biting

== His yachts ==
- Truant – a 31-ton ketch conversion of a Looe lugger (48 ft, 47, 13, 5) with twin 35 kp petrol engines – Isabel and the Sea
- Serica – a speedy 16-ton ocean-racing sloop (45 ft, 30, 10, 6.5) – A White Boat from England
- Amokura – 24-ton yawl (50.3 ft, 37.7, 12, 7) Oyster River

== Reviews ==
- 14 January 1946 – Time for Waiting in the Night (Maquis)
- 10 June 1946 – Time for Horned Pigeon
- 16 December 1946 – Time: "Perhaps the most readable personal war reporting of the year was by Britain's Captain George Reid Millar, who described in Horned Pigeon and Waiting in the Night his hair-raising escape from a Nazi P.O.W. camp and subsequent undercover work with the French Maquis."
- 18 July 1948 – The Milwaukee Journal for Isabel and the Sea
- 26 July 1948 – Time for Isabel and the Sea
