= Denise Bloch =

French espionage agent (1916–1945)

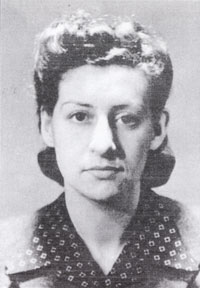
- Bloch in 1930s or 1940s
- Born: 21 January 1916; Paris, France
- Died: 5 February 1945 (aged 29); Ravensbrück concentration camp
- Military career
- Allegiance: United Kingdom; France
- Branch: Women's Transport Service (FANY); Special Operations Executive, French Resistance
- Service years: 1942–1945/1943–1945 (SOE)
- Nickname: Ambroise
- Units: Clergyman; Detective
- Awards: King's Commendation for Brave Conduct; Légion d'honneur Médaille de la Résistance; Croix de Guerre

Denise Madeleine Bloch (French pronunciation: [dəniz blɔk]; 21 January 1916 – 5 February 1945) was a French citizen who worked as an agent with the clandestine British Special Operations Executive (SOE) organization in the Second World War. The purpose of SOE was to conduct espionage, sabotage, and reconnaissance in countries occupied by the Axis powers, especially those occupied by Nazi Germany. SOE agents allied themselves with resistance groups and supplied them with weapons and equipment parachuted in from England.

Bloch and her family, who were Jewish, evaded capture by the Germans in Paris after its occupation by Nazi Germany in summer 1940. In 1942 the family escaped to Lyon. Bloch became involved in the French Resistance and narrowly avoided arrest in Lyon. Fleeing to southwestern France, she worked for SOE agent George Reginald Starr as his courier. In May 1942, she made a dangerous crossing of the Pyrenees into Spain and hence to SOE headquarters in London to present Starr's request for more aid to his resistance forces. Although known to the Germans and with a price on her head, Bloch was trained as a radio operator by SOE and sent back to France in 1944 to help carry out sabotage missions against the Germans. She was captured and sent to prison camps in Germany and executed in late January or early February 1945 at Ravensbrück concentration camp.

== Early life ==
Bloch was born to a Jewish family (Jacques Henri Bloch and Suzanne Levi-Strauss) in Paris, France in 1916. She had three brothers. Her father and two of her brothers were French soldiers taken prisoner by the German army in 1940. The Germans occupied northern France in summer 1940 and anti-Jewish campaigns began. Her mother, her brother Jean-Claude, and Denise then lived a clandestine life avoiding persecution as Jews by using false papers and identities. In the summer of 1942, the family was smuggled across the border from occupied to unoccupied Vichy France arriving in Lyon on 17 July.

== Working for the Resistance and SOE ==
In Lyon Bloch became a secretary for Jean-Maxime Aron, a Jewish engineer for Citroen who was working with the French Resistance and the SOE network led by Philippe de Vomécourt. Bloch began working for Aron as a courier, delivering messages to agents around the region. Through her work with Aron, Bloch met several Jews working in the French Resistance and SOE agents sent from London to help the Resistance. As a cover she fabricated an engagement to Dominique Mendelsohn, also involved in the resistance. She helped SOE organiser Henri Sevenet, radio operator Brian Stonehouse and courier Blanche Charlet. She witnessed Stonehouse being escorted by police officers after his arrest on 14 October 1942. (Stonehouse survived the war in German prison camps; Charlet escaped prison and survived.) Mendelsohn was also soon arrested. Realizing she was in danger, on 26 October SOE agent Paul Sarrette decided that he would accompany her from Lyon to a safe house in Marseilles. Bloch sent a telegram to her mother in Lyon with her travel plans. The Germans intercepted the telegram. As a result, Aron, who accompanied Bloch to the railroad station, was arrested. Bloch and Sarrette evaded arrest.

After Aron's arrest, Bloch went into hiding in Lyon and later Villefranche-sur-Mer on the French Riviera. She dyed her black hair blond as a disguise, but her height of 5 feet 10 inches (178 cm) made her conspicuous. In January 1943, Sarrette accompanied Bloch to Toulouse which was the territory of SOE agents George Reginald Starr and Henri Sevenet. Starr and Sevenet initially regarded Bloch as a nuisance and Starr proposed "to liquidate her." However, they decided instead to evacuate her over the Pyrenees to Spain. The mid-winter crossing on foot was thwarted by heavy snow. Bloch returned to Toulouse where she first met Starr in person. He was impressed and invited her to become his courier and stay with him at his base in a house in the isolated village of Castelnau-sur-l'Auvignon. The two became inseparable and possibly lovers. Starr had no radio operator at the time and Bloch weekly made the long journey to Toulouse to communicate with SOE headquarters in London with SOE agent Marcus Bloom's radio. However, in April 1943, Bloom was arrested by the Germans. Without a means of communicating with London and in desperate need of supplies for his resistance groups, Starr sent Bloch to London with a written report of his activities and as an advocate for him. She walked across the Pyrenees mountains with Maurice Dupont as a guide, but the Spanish briefly arrested her and confiscated Starr's report. Bloch made her way to the British territory of Gibraltar and was flown to England, arriving there on 21 May.

Illustrating that the Germans knew of Bloch, on 29 June 1943 she was convicted in absentia and sentenced to ten years hard labor.

In London, Bloch was debriefed by SOE and expressed the desire to return to France. SOE initially opposed her return as she was known to the Germans and SOE's French section deputy Nicolas Bodington complained that she was a security risk and should be removed from SOE. Bloch, in return, was contemptuous of the SOE. Eventually, SOE decided to train her as a radio operator and send her back to a different area of France where she was not known.

== Return to France ==
On 2 March 1944, with fellow SOE agent and former racing car driver, Robert Benoist, Bloch landed at a clandestine landing site in central France. Working in the Nantes area for the Clergyman circuit, the pair re-established contact with SOE agent and Benoist's fellow racing car driver, Jean-Pierre Wimille. Their objectives were to destroy pylons on the power line at Ile Heron in Nantes and to interrupt railroad transportation in support of the allied invasion of France which took place on 6 June. On 17 June, their preparations apparently in place, Benoist called a meeting of the key members of the network at his villa near Sermaise, a violation of SOE's guidance that members of a network should have as little contact with each other as possible. During dinner, he announced that he had received news that his mother was dying and he was leaving to visit her. He warned that if he didn't return by lunch the next day, 18 June, the members of the network should disperse. Benoist was arrested by the Germans outside his mother's apartment in Paris. His warning to his associates to disperse was not heeded and at about 8 p.m. on 18 June the Sicherheitsdienst (SD) raided the villa and captured Bloch and the others.

== Imprisonment and execution ==
Bloch was interrogated at SD headquarters at 84 Avenue Foch in Paris and imprisoned at Fresnes Prison. On 8 August 1944, with the allies advancing on Paris, Bloch and other captured SOE agents was sent by train to Germany. In late August she reached Ravensbrück concentration camp for women. Along with SOE agents Violette Szabo and Lilian Rolfe she volunteered for a work party at Torgau in Saxony, where conditions were better than at Ravensbrūck. They attempted, but failed to escape. Sent back to Ravensbrück, they were beaten and put in an underground bunker. On 19 October, they were sent to Königsberg in Brandenburg where they were forced to do heavy labor in winter conditions. Recalled to Ravensbrück in late January 1945, they were in pitiful condition. Rolfe was no longer able to walk and Bloch was "suffering from gangrene." A few days later they were taken to the courtyard by the crematorium. Camp commandant Fritz Suhren read the order for their execution and they were each shot in the back of the head with a small caliber pistol. Their bodies were cremated. An eyewitness said the women were "very brave" and that Commandant Suhren was annoyed that the Gestapo "did not themselves carry out the execution."

Bloch's family gravesite at the Montmartre Cemetery in Paris memorialises her life and execution.

== Recognition ==
=== Awards ===
| UK | 1939-45 Star |
| UK | France and Germany Star |
| UK | War Medal with King's Commendation for Brave Conduct |
| France | Légion d'honneur (Chevalier) |
| France | Croix de Guerre with palm |
| France | Médaille de la Résistance |

=== Monuments ===
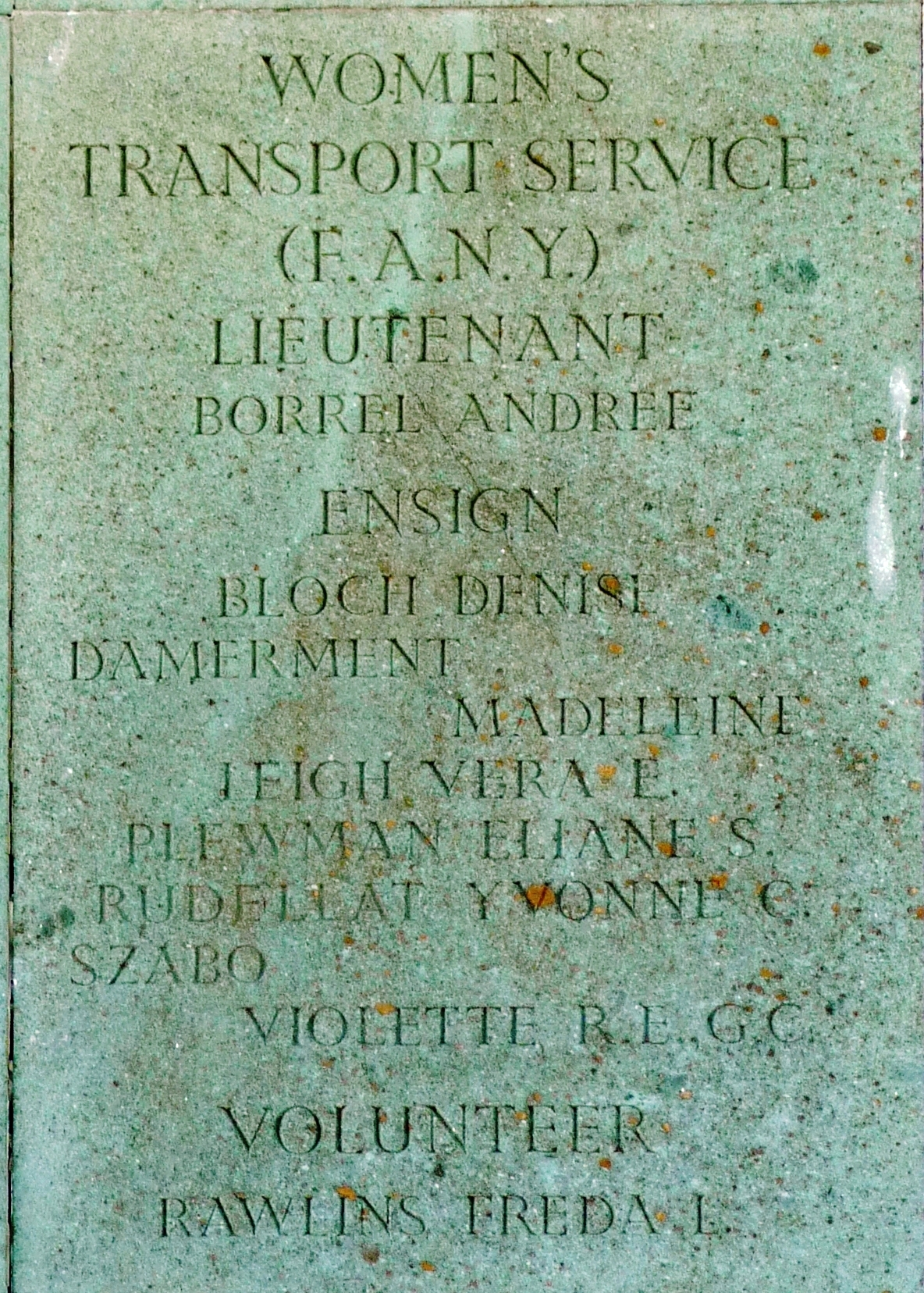
FANY (SOE) memorial, Brookwood Military Cemetery, 5 July 2017

Britain

- Brookwood Memorial as one of 3,500 "to whom war denied a known and honoured grave".
- FANY memorial (First Aid Nursing Yeomanry) in Wilton Road, Kensington.
- Tempsford Memorial as one of the women of the SOE who went out from RAF Tempsford and other airfields and port to aid resistance movements in occupied Europe, 1941 - 1945

France

- Valençay SOE Memorial in Valençay, Indre, in the "Roll of Honour" of the 91 men and 13 women members of the SOE who gave their lives for France's freedom.
