= Francis Basin =

French secret agent

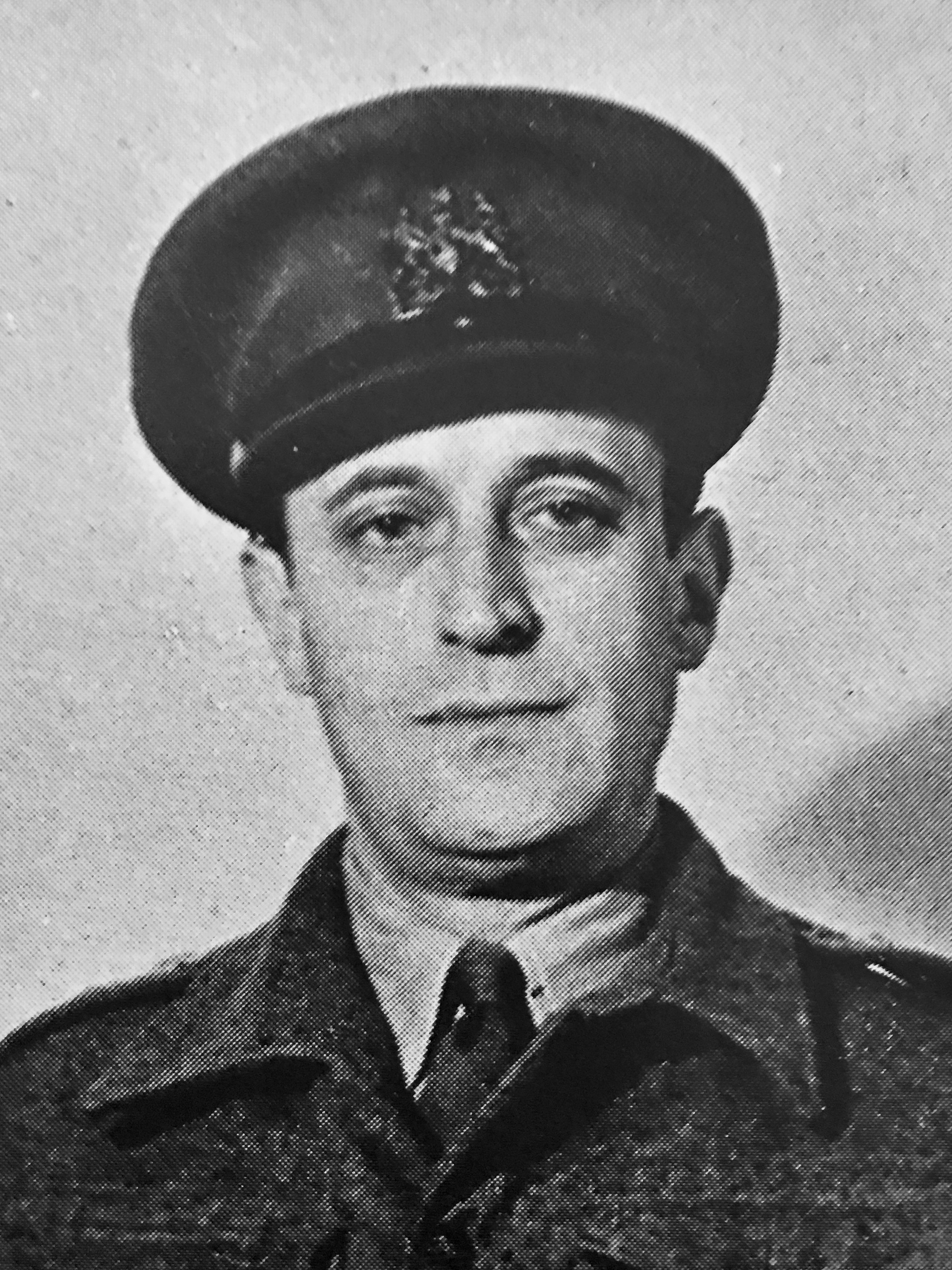
- Born: 6 August 1903; Grasse, France
- Died: 20 October 1975 (aged 72); Paris
- Military career
- Allegiance: France
- Branch: British Army
- Service years: 1940–1945
- Rank: Lieutenant
- Units: Special Operations Executive, Section F
- Conflicts: Second World War
- Awards: Member of the Order of the British Empire; Croix de guerre 1939–1945, Resistance Medal, Knight of the Legion of Honor, Office of the Order of the Legion of Honour

Francis Basin LdH CdeG MBE (1903–1975), code named Olive, was an agent of the United Kingdom's clandestine Special Operations Executive in France during the Second World War. The purpose of SOE was to conduct espionage, sabotage, and reconnaissance in countries occupied by the Axis powers, especially Nazi Germany. SOE agents allied themselves with resistance groups and supplied them with weapons and equipment parachuted in from England.

== Early life ==
François Marcel Basin was born on 6 August 1903 in Grasse, the son of Antoine Basin, a railway employee, and Élise née Vernin.

== Wartime activities ==
In August 1940, he enlisted in the British army on the advice of Colonel Massip to whom he was secretary and who was close to General de Gaulle. Incorporated as a private soldier with thirty other Frenchmen, he undertook all the classes without thinking of becoming a secret agent. He attended the Liaison Officer course at Wanborough Manor (Guildford) and took the exam on 27 December 1940. He was then visited by the commander Nicolas Bodington, director of Section F prior to Maurice Buckmaster. Bodington offered him special training to go to France on a dangerous mission. "Think about it," he advised. "You will give me your answer tomorrow." Basin replied: "I prefer to say ‘yes’ straight away. If I think, I will deflate."

He was one of the first recruits of the SOE. On 14 July 1941, he was promoted to Lieutenant.

=== Mission in France ===
He was head of the URCHIN network on the Côte d'Azur, working under the nom de guerre of "Olive".

On 28 August 1941, he sailed from England to Gibraltar in HMS Fidelity in Operation AUTOGYRO and on the night of 19/20 September 1941 landed by submarine at Le Barcarès near Perpignan with Robert Leroy "Louis", Raymond Roche "François", and Georges Duboudin "Alain".

The day after his arrival, Basin was arrested by the police at his hotel in Cannes and held in Fort Saint-Nicolas of Marseille. The investigating judge recognised his good faith and released him on 5 October 1941. Then for more than ten months until his arrest in August 1942 he developed the URCHIN network.

He made contact with Élie Lévy, whose house in Antibes became a reception centre for many agents in transit. Lévy put him in touch with André Girard, head of the CARTE network.

He established his headquarters in Cannes, in the Villa Isabelle. Baron Henri Ravel of Malval "Antoine", whom he knew at the beginning of the war and whom he met by chance in Cannes, put his house at his disposal. There, Basin received SOE agents landed on the Côte d'Azur. It formed 31 cells covering several departments: Bouches-du-Rhône, Var, Basses-Alpes, Alpes-Maritimes, of which seven cells were assigned to propaganda.

He was in regular contact with American SOE agent Virginia Hall "Marie", based in Lyon. Together, they prepared reports for London.

On 15 January 1942 Peter Churchill arrived by submarine to evaluate his network, provide him with Fr.400,000 and revised guidelines.

He established contact with the leaders of resistance movements and supported them financially: Henri Frenay (FREEDOM, which became COMBAT), General de La Laurencie (LIBERATION NATIONAL), Emmanuel d'Astier de la Vigerie "Bernard" (LIBERATION).

He was in contact with London, first by reports sent by the Swiss diplomatic bag, then also by radio from 20 April 1942 after the arrival of Isidore Newman "Julien", the radio operator assigned to him. Impressed by the possibilities of contact with London that Basin could assure, André Girard agreed to send one of his officers to England, and chose Henri Frager, his second in command. Taking advantage of the departure of Max Hymans "Frédéric" for London, Basin sent a report on his relations with the MAP network. Unfortunately, Max Hymans was interned for three months in Spain, and the report arrived in London only on 12 August 1942.

=== Arrest ===
On 18 August 1942 Basin was arrested in Cannes by the Security Service, having been given away by a Swiss diplomatic courier, Jean Cogniat, who was arrested at the Swiss border in possession of secret reports of Basin.

On the night of 27/ 28 August 1942 Peter Churchill returned to the south of France to take over the URCHIN network in the Midi under the name of SPINDLE. Churchill planned to rescue Basin but this attempt was called off, apparently at Basin's request.

On 4 September 1942 there was a failed attempt by the MAP network to rescue Basin in a train taking him to Montluc prison in Lyon.

=== Release ===
On 29 November 1942 Basin was released from Montluc prison with false provisional liberty papers. The Germans, who had invaded the free zone, were searching for him. He was weak and in need of medical care, but had to disappear quickly. With the help of Lazare Rachline (VIC escape network), Virginia Hall took him to Mont-Dore and placed him in a safe house in Auvergne. He then went to Nîmes where a plane came to fetch him, but he broke his leg in an accident on the ground.

On 20 August 1943 he was flown back to London in a Hudson in Operation DYER, organized by Henri Déricourt. Accompanying him were Peter Deman "Paul" from section DF; Marie-Thérèse Le Chêne, Tony Brooks "Alphonse", Robert Boiteux "Nicolas", Octave Simon, Joseph Marchand, Victor Gerson, Robert Benoist, Raymonde Mennessier, Jean-Louis de Ganay. Basin remained in London until the end of the war, firstly as an instructor at the Beaulieu Special Training School, then at the headquarters of Section F in London. Finally, he was reinstated in the French services (BCRA), staff FFI on 19 September 1944.

=== Post-war ===
He testified about his wartime experiences on 18 March 1947 with Miss Patrimonio, and on 3 November 1971 with André Gillois.

He died in Paris on 20 October 1975.

== Awards ==
- United Kingdom: Member of the Order of the British Empire (MBE),
- France: Croix de Guerre 1939–1945, Médaille de la Résistance, Légion d'honneur (1946), Officer of the Légion d'honneur(1951).

| Légion d'honneur (Chevalier) | Croix de Guerre | Médaille de la Résistance | Member of the Order of the British Empire |

== External sources ==
- Chronology of SOE operations with the resistance in France during World War II , Lt. Col. EG Boxshall, 1960, typed document (copy from the Pearl Witherington-Pearlioley Library), available at Valençay. See sheet 17, DONKEYMAN CIRCUIT .
- Le réseau carte : Histoire d'un réseau de la Résistance antiallemand, antigaulliste, anticommuniste et anticollaborationniste, Perrin, 2008, 398 p. (ISBN 978-2262026462)
- The spy: Virginia Hall, an American in the war. Vincent Nouzille, Fayard, Paris. ISBN 978-2-213-62827-1
- The uncertain adventure Claude Bourdet.
