= Adolphe Rabinovitch =

French military officer (1918–1944)

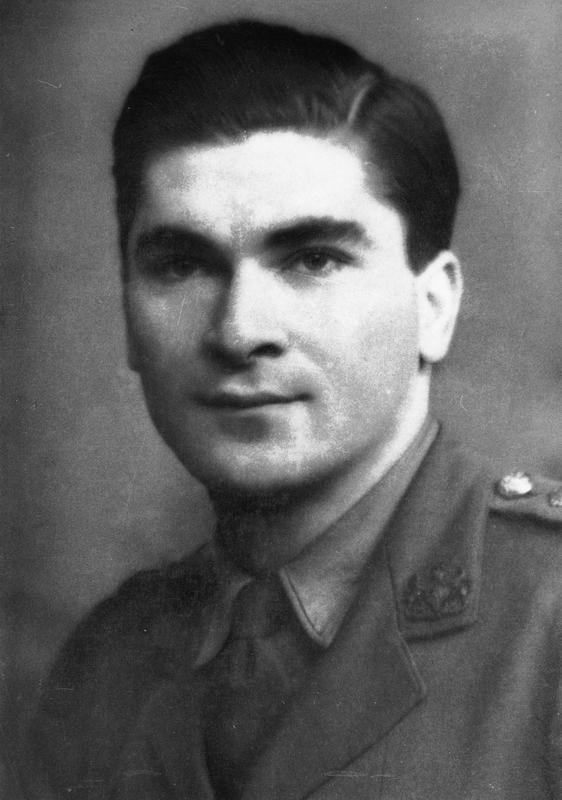
- Adolphe Rabinovitch
- Born: May 27, 1918; Moscow, Russia
- Died: 1944 (aged 25–26); Gross-Rosen concentration camp, Poland
- Burial place: Cremated
- Military career
- Allegiance: France; United Kingdom
- Branch: French Foreign Legion; Special Operations Executive
- Service years: 1939–1940 (French Foreign Legion); 1942–1944 (SOE)
- Rank: Captain
- Nickname: Alec
- Service number: 234268
- Unit: SOE F Section, Spindle network
- Conflicts: Second World War
- Awards: Croix de guerre 1939-1945 with Étoile de Vermeil; Mentioned in Despatches

Adolphe Rabinovitch (27 May 1918 – 1944), also known as Alec Rabinovitch, was a Special Operations Executive officer in France during the Second World War. He rose to the rank of captain.

== Life ==
Born to a family of Jewish extraction in Russia and raised in Egypt, he studied in Paris and lived in the United States before the outbreak of the war. He was a junior wrestling and boxing champion in his youth, and has been described as a "giant of a man."

In 1939 he volunteered in the French Foreign Legion. He was taken prisoner by the Germans in June 1940 but escaped after three months. He then escaped to Britain via Spain and became an SOE agent. Rabinovitch was described by a trainer as argumentative and humourless, an "enigma."

He was first parachuted into France on 28/29 August 1942 north of Grenoble. He was dropped in the wrong place and became a radio operator for the SPINDLE network (codename "Arnaud"), with Peter Churchill and Odette Sansom, and managed to evade capture when that network collapsed. With Victor Hazan (codename "Gervais"), he got back in contact with the network's contacts around Annecy and on the Côte d'Azur before returning to England via Spain. There he became the assistant to Jean de Lattre de Tassigny before being parachuted back into France on the night of 2/3 March 1944 with Roméo Sabourin. His orders were to set up and command the BARGEE network, but the landing site was under German control and he was wounded and captured as he landed. Because he was a Jew, he was deported to Gross-Rosen concentration camp in Poland, where he was gassed.

Peter Churchill dedicated his book Duel of Wits to "my beloved Arnaud, the late Captain Alec Rabinovitch, a violent, difficult, devoted and heroic radio operator, and through him to all 'underground' men and women of his supreme calibre who died, as they lived, in solitude. Their feats are legendary and beyond all military awards."

In the 1950 British film Odette he is played by Peter Ustinov.

== Recognition ==
=== Distinctions ===
- UK: Mentioned in Despatches.
- France : Croix de guerre 1939–1945 with Étoile de Vermeil.

=== Monuments ===
- His name is on the SOE memorial at Valençay, Indre, France.
- Brookwood Memorial, Surrey, panel 21, column 3.
