= Yvonne Baseden =

British Special Operations Executive (1922–2017)

- in uniform
- Born: 20 January 1922; Paris, France
- Died: 28 October 2017 (aged 95)
- Military career
- Allegiance: United Kingdom/France
- Branch: WAAF, Special Operations Executive, French Resistance
- Service years: 1944–1945
- Rank: Flight Officer, field agent and SOE agent
- Nickname: Odette
- Commands: SOE F Section
- Awards: Legion d'Honneur, Croix de Guerre avec palme, MBE, Croix du combattant volontaire de la Résistance

Yvonne Jeanne de Vibraye Baseden MBE (20 January 1922 – 28 October 2017), later known as Yvonne Burney, was one of approximately forty female Special Operations Executive (SOE) agents who served in France. The objective of SOE was to conduct espionage, sabotage and reconnaissance in occupied Europe against the Axis powers, especially Nazi Germany. SOE agents in France allied themselves with resistance groups and supplied them with weapons and equipment parachuted in from Britain.

== Background and early life ==
She was born in Rue Violet, Paris. Baseden's father was a World War I pilot in the Royal Flying Corps. He crash-landed in France at the home of the Comte de Vibraye, where he was invited by the Comtesse to have dinner. Whilst at the dinner, he met and fell in love with the daughter of the Comte and Comtesse. The couple went on to marry and lived in France following the end of the War.

The family travelled and lived around Europe, so as a result Baseden was educated at schools in England, France, Poland, Italy, and Spain in addition to being bilingual (English and French), she also spoke a basic level of many other languages. In 1937, the family moved to London, where they settled in Tottenham. Baseden was uninterested in school and left school aged 16 to work apple picking in Bedfordshire. In 1939, before the outbreak of war, she moved to Southampton, where she worked as a bilingual shorthand typist in an engineering firm.

== WAAF and Special Operations Executive ==
On 4 September 1940 (aged 18), Baseden joined the Women's Auxiliary Air Force (WAAF) as a General Duties Clerk (Service No 4189). She was commissioned in 1941 (later promoted to the rank of Section Officer) and worked in the RAF Intelligence branch, where she assisted in the interrogation of captured airmen and submarine crews. It was through this work that she came to the attention of the Special Operations Executive (SOE), which she joined on 24 May 1943.

Baseden left from RAF Tempsford airbase near Sandy on the night of 18/19 March 1944. Her field name was "Odette". She was parachuted into France with Gonzague de Saint-Geniès, a French organizer (field name: "Lucien"). They were dropped into South West France, close to the village of Gabarret. The local resistance were working for George Starr's network named "Wheelwright". They hid them for a few days, then she made her own way across France, her wireless equipment travelling separately, to Jura in Eastern France, where she worked for three months as the wireless operator to the Scholar circuit. Her cover story was that she was "Mademoiselle Yvonne Bernier", a shorthand typist and secretary.

Following the largest daylight air drop of the war to that date, during a routine search by the Gestapo on 26 June 1944, she was trapped in a cheese factory with seven colleagues from the network. Her organiser took a suicide pill immediately, as he was known to the Gestapo. Baseden was found, arrested and taken away for local questioning. At the end of that month, she was moved to the Gestapo Headquarters in Dijon and kept in solitary confinement.

On 25 August 1944, she was transferred to a prison in Saarbrücken and then to Ravensbrück concentration camp on 4 September of the same year. While at Ravensbrück, she became ill and was put in the camp hospital, nursed by, among others, Mary Lindell, where she remained until the liberation of the camp. She was one of about 500 women released from Ravensbrück to the Swedish Red Cross in April 1945 in the closing days of the war.

All the women were driven in coaches, the "White Buses", across Germany and Denmark and then on to Sweden. In Malmö, they were cleaned and deloused. Baseden spent her first nights of freedom on a mattress on the floor of the Malmö Museum of Prehistory, sleeping under the skeletons of dinosaurs. She was then flown to Scotland and put on a train to Euston. On her arrival at Euston, there was no one to meet her, so she called the Air Ministry and the duty officer arranged for Vera Atkins to meet her. Atkins then took her home to her father at Brockwell Park.

== Honours and awards ==
She was awarded the MBE by Britain and the Legion of Honour; the Resistance Medal and the Croix de Guerre avec Palme by France.

Member of the Order of the British Empire
1939–1945 Star	France and Germany Star	War Medal
Légion d'honneur (Chevalier)	Croix de Guerre (France)	Médaille de la Résistance

== After the war ==
After the war, she became the first regular subject of the BBC programme This Is Your Life when she was surprised by Eamonn Andrews in the BBC Television Theatre in September 1955. She married and moved to what was then Northern Rhodesia, where her husband worked in the Colonial Service. She remarried in 1966, took the name Yvonne Burney, and moved to Portugal and then in 1999 returned to London.

She no longer wanted to talk about her experiences in the war, but at the age of 80 she recounted her story through an interview with Martyn Cox for Legasee, The Veterans Video Archive. She also gave a brief interview to Sarah Helm for her biography of Vera Atkins, and appeared in a French documentary (Robert et les Ombres) in which she met, 60 years after the events, two of the Resistance fighters who were in the field when she was dropped. Baseden died in October 2017 at the age of 95.

== Sources ==
- Vigurs, Kate (2021). Mission France: The True History of the Women of SOE. New Haven: Yale University Press. ISBN 978-0-300-25884-4.
- Liane Jones, A Quiet Courage: Women Agents in the French Resistance, London, Transworld Publishers Ltd, 1990; ISBN 0-593-01663-7
- Marcus Binney, The Women Who Lived for Danger: The Women Agents of SOE in the Second World War, London, Hodder and Stoughton, 2002; ISBN 0-340-81840-9
- Sarah Helm, A Life in Secrets: The Story of Vera Atkins and the Lost Agents of SOE, London, Abacus, 2005; ISBN 978-0-349-11936-6
