= Richard Henry Heslop =

Richard Henry Heslop DSO
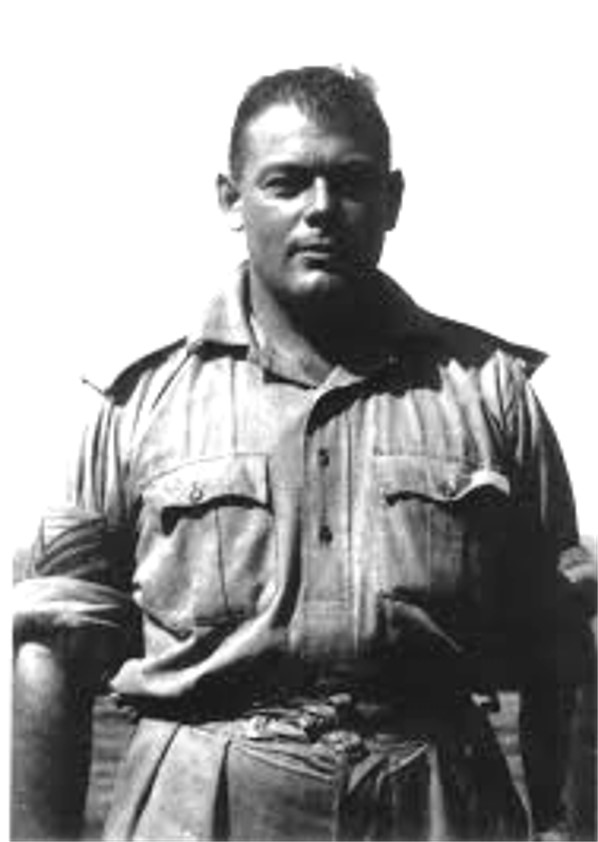
- Richard Heslop in 1943 or 1944
- Born: January 23, 1907; Cierp-Gaud, France
- Died: January 17, 1973 (aged 65)
- Military career
- Allegiance: United Kingdom
- Branch: Special Operations Executive; British Army
- Rank: Lieutenant Colonel
- Nickname: Xavier
- Unit: Marksman
- Commands: Marksman
- Awards: Légion d'honneur, Croix de guerre, Presidential Medal of Freedom

Heslop worked in Ain and adjoining departments of France.

Lieutenant-Colonel Richard Henry Heslop DSO (23 January 1907 – 17 January 1973) code named Xavier, was an agent in France of the United Kingdom's clandestine Special Operations Executive (SOE) organization during World War II. The purpose of SOE was to conduct espionage, sabotage, and reconnaissance in countries occupied by Nazi Germany or other Axis powers. SOE agents allied themselves with resistance groups and supplied them with weapons and equipment parachuted in from England.

Heslop undertook two missions to France, the first from July 1942 to June 1943 and the second and more important mission from September 1943 until September 1944. In his second mission, Heslop was the organiser of the Marksman network (or circuit) assisting one of the largest groups of the French Resistance which operated in the mountainous region near the border with Switzerland.

Of the more than 400 SOE agents who worked in France during World War II, M.R.D. Foot, the official historian of the SOE, named Heslop as one of a half-dozen best male agents. Although military rank was not very important in SOE, Heslop was one of only three SOE agents to become a Lt. Colonel along with Francis Cammaerts and George Starr. Heslop's reports to London on his activities were brief, leaving little grist for the historian's mill beyond his book, Xavier, first published in 1970.

== Personal life ==
Heslop was born in Cierp-Gaud, France, the only son and youngest child of William Heslop, a horse trainer. His mother was Vera Molesworth Muspratt, a lepidopterist who had species of butterflies named in her honor. Heslop mentions in his book that he had a wife, named Vi, and a daughter, born in 1944. In 1970 he spoke of his wife in the past tense.

== Special Operations Executive ==
Heslop applied for the Field Security Police in England in February 1940 and as a corporal took part in an unsuccessful attempt to capture Dakar in Senegal from Vichy France in September 1940. He then went to Sierra Leone before returning to England in January 1941. In November 1941, he became a member of the Special Operations Executive, going through the usual training courses.

=== First mission ===
Heslop was infiltrated into France by boat, landing near Cassis on the Mediterranean coast on the night of 19/20 July 1942. After a few days of orientation he traveled to Lyon where he met with SOE agent Virginia Hall, French resistance leader Philippe de Vomécourt, his friend SOE agent Edward Wilkinson, and Denis Rake, his wireless operator. Heslop and Wilkinson were immediately negative about Rake and blamed him for the arrest of all three by French police in Limoges in August.

The three SOE agents spent almost 3 months in miserable, starving conditions in the Castres prison before being transferred on 7 November to an internment camp for captured British soldiers. Conditions in Vichy France became much more dangerous for SOE agents after 8 November 1942 when the Germans invaded and took over the rump state of Vichy. On 27 November, the French commandant of the internment camp released Heslop, Wilkinson, and Rake to avoid having to turn them over to the Germans. A bus took them to nearby Roybon and they were given money and ration cards. Heslop and Wilkinson decided to leave the region as quickly as possible and walked to Le Puy-en-Velay, 160 kilometres (99 miles) distant, where they separated.

For several months Heslop traveled around France, looking for a means to communicate with SOE in London so that he could become operational. He found Edward Wilkinson in Angers. He helped a local resistance group receive an airdrop of arms and equipment for the Resistance sent by SOE. Finally in contact with London, he returned to England on the night of 23/24 June 1943 via a Westland Lysander airplane which picked him up at a clandestine airfield near Pocé-sur-Cisse.

=== Second mission ===
Heslop's mis-adventures during his first mission hardened him. In his words, he went to France a "boy scout" and came back as a "professional, able to hate, but hate with a coldness that kept my temper under control." Many SOE agents did not survive their first few weeks or months in France, including Heslop's friend Edward Wilkinson who was captured by the Germans in June 1943 and later executed. Heslop returned to France the night of 21/22 September 1943, landing near Arbigny in Ain Department. He was accompanied by Jean Rosenthal, the son of a prominent Paris jeweler. The task the two were given was to assess the strength of the Maquis (rural resistance forces) in five departments along the border of France with Switzerland. The pair spent three weeks in France, before returning to London in October with their favorable report. They returned to France two days later, 18/19 October traveling this time with a wireless operator, American Owen Denis Johnson, and a courier (also with American roots), Elizabeth Devereux-Rochester.

Heslop, code named Xavier, headed a network, called Marksman. He worked primarily in three French Departments: Ain, Haute-Savoie, and Jura. Heslop identified three enemies in his region: the German army, the Groupe mobile de réserve (GMR), a semi-trained paramilitary of the Vichy government, and the Milice, a vicious, pro-German militia. Three different groups (often fragmented between and among themselves) made up the armed French resistance: the maquis, rural fighters; the Secret Army, a pro-de Gaulle paramilitary; and the communists, fiercely in opposition to Charles de Gaulle. Heslop worked primarily in rural areas. SOE networks were more secure in rural areas which had a much smaller presence of German soldiers and milice, the pro-German French militia, than large urban areas.

Heslop's primary contact was the maquis leader Henri Romans-Petit, commander of the Maquis of Ain and Haut-Jura. Romans had 1,000 followers in the Ain, mostly young men fleeing their homes to avoid being forced by the Germans to work in factories in Germany. They were scattered around the region in groups of 30 to 40 in camps hidden in the mountains and forests. With an infusion of money and arms airdropped from England, the number of resistors in the region increased to about 3,500, not all of whom would become armed combatants. The maquis began sabotage operations, including ambushes on German soldiers and units, although avoiding direct confrontations. SOE London responded by air dropping large quantities of arms and supplies for the maquis. Although Heslop and Johnson had been instructed by SOE not to participate in sabotage operations, they did so on two occasions, believing it necessary for their credibility with the maquis.

Heslop, according to Foot, was a charismatic and dedicated leader, who dealt capably, as many SOE agents did not, with the prickly French Resistance leaders who guarded their authority while being dependent upon financial support and arms from the SOE. Heslop said that, he "led without appearing to lead." Heslop also created a few "personal" groups, directed by him, and unknown to the French Resistance leaders. A major task of his was effecting cooperation among loosely-organized and often competing resistance groups, many of them communists. He avoided any discussion of his own politics. Heslop traveled around his large area of operations by automobile and truck, risking capture at checkpoints manned by French police.

==== German Counterattack ====
The Germans and their French allies soon responded to the growing threat of the Resistance in Heslop's area of operations. The French pro-German militia, the Milice, burned more than 500 farms suspected of being used by the maquis in Haute-Savoie Department during the three winter months of 1943-1944. In February 1944, 4,500 members of the Milice and the Groupe mobile de réserve (GMR) invaded the Ain and Haute-Savoie Departments and in an operation lasting two months captured more than 1,000 members of the Resistance. In early March, Tom Morel, the maquis commander on the Glieres Plateau, was killed in a commando raid on a GMR headquarters. Later that month the German army and Milice attacked the plateau in force, defeating and dispersing 700 maquis. In early 1944 the impatient and newly-armed maquis were all too eager to take on the German military directly rather than confining themselves to sabotage and guerrilla tactics, as advised by Heslop and the SOE. As a result of the German victories, Heslop found himself on the run to evade capture.

==== D-Day and beyond ====
In April and May 1944, as the French became aware that the allies would soon invade France, the situation on the ground for Heslop and his Marksman network changed. The GMR lost its enthusiasm for repressing the Resistance and its leaders began to come over to the side of the maquis. The number of recruits for the maquis increased, especially French officers who had straddled the fence for 4 years but now demanded commands in the Resistance. These late-comers were called the "Mothball Brigade" (because their military uniforms had been hanging unused in their closets until allied victory became likely) and were shunted aside into units of their own.

Heslop and Roman-Petit's objectives after D-Day were to kill every German and to end all rail transport in their 26,000 square kilometres (10,000 sq mi) area of operations. On May 15, Heslop reported to London a total of 1,300 armed maquis in his core area of operations: 700 in Ain, 400 in Haut-Savoie, and 200 in Jura. He also armed an additional 2,000 men, members of the Armée Secrète which owed allegiance to Charles de Gaulle, who increasingly was taking over leadership of all the different resistance groups.

Two major attacks on railroads took place almost immediately after the D-Day (6 June 1944) allied invasion of France. On the night of 6–7 June the maquis damaged 52 locomotives with explosives in Ambérieu-en-Bugey. Two days later they damaged 38 locomotives in Bourg-en-Bresse, another prominent rail center. In the case of Bourg, the allied command had warned that the town would be bombed by air, causing civilian casualties, if the maquis were not able to damage the railyard. The Germans counterattacked strongly in July and August, partially to destroy the maquis and partially to keep a route open for the retreat of their army in southern France after the allied invasion (Operation Dragoon) on 15 August. Throughout this period, Heslop was under increasing pressure from the de Gaullists to declare support for General de Gaulle, who many of the maquis and especially the communists opposed.

In late August, Heslop traveled by automobile south to near Grenoble to meet the American army advancing north. He agreed that 2,000 maquis would shadow the American advance through the strategic Belfort Gap, but declined to participate in the liberation of Lyon as the maquis were incapable of taking on large conventional forces in pitched battles. In a bizarre incident in mid-September, Henri Romans-Petit, the commander of the maquis supplied by Heslop, was arrested and imprisoned for a few weeks by the new French government of de Gaulle. (Romans-Petit was treated as an honored guest by the jailers in the prison.) Heslop was also ordered by De Gaulle's government to leave France immediately which he declined to do. After being ordered by SOE to leave, Heslop traveled to Paris and spent a few days there before returning to England.

== Footnotes ==
=== Sources ===
- Foot, M. R. D. (1976) [1966]. SOE in France: An Account of the Work of the British Special Operations Executive in France, 1940-1944. London: Her Majesty's Stationery Office. ISBN 9780116301925. OCLC 249930650.
  - Reprinted: Foot, M. R. D. (2004). SOE in France: An Account of the Work of the British Special Operations Executive in France, 1940-1944. doi:10.4324/9780203496138. ISBN 978-0-203-49613-8. OCLC 56550748.
- Heslop, Richard Henry (2014). Xavier : a British secret agent with the French Resistance. London, England: Biteback Publishing. pp. 48–49. ISBN 978-1-84954-774-1. OCLC 884013767.
