= Robert Byerly =

Canadian espionage agent

- Born: Robert Bennett Byerly; March 20, 1916; Drexel Hill, Pennsylvania, US
- Died: May 8, 1945 (aged 29); Gross-Rosen concentration camp, Poland
- Education: University of Chicago
- Occupation: Radio operator
- Espionage activity
- Allegiance: Canada; United Kingdom
- Service branch: Canadian Army; Special Operations Executive
- Service years: 1941–1945
- Rank: Lieutenant
- Codename: Gontrand
- Codename: Biologist

Robert Bennett Byerly (March 20, 1916 – May 8, 1945) was an American-born Canadian soldier, who was an agent for the British Special Operations Executive (SOE) during World War II.

== Background ==
Byerly, a graduate of the University of Chicago, worked as a journalist and schoolteacher before the outbreak of the Second World War. He was in Paris when Germany invaded France in 1940, but was permitted to leave to the United Kingdom as he was an American citizen. In April 1941, Byerly enlisted in the Canadian Army's Royal Canadian Corps of Signals. A skilled radio operator and linguist, Byerly underwent advanced wireless training in England in 1943. After completing his training, he was commissioned in the Canadian Army and recruited to the United Kingdom's Special Operations Executive on July 3, 1943. He was subsequently given a new identity as "Robert Antoine Breuil".

On the night of February 8/9, 1944, Byerly was one of four SOE agents who left England and parachuted into France near Orleans as part of a mission. However, the Germans had managed to intercept the SOE's radio transmissions and captured the agents just after they landed. Byerly and the other agents were interrogated in Chartres before being transferred to a Gestapo prison at 3 bis Place des États-Unis in Paris. Their immediate captured upon arrival left them with little knowledge of local underground resistance activity.

== Disappearance ==
In July 1944, Byerly was transported from Paris, most likely to the Gross-Rosen concentration camp in Poland. He was not seen or heard from again, and was reported as missing and presumed executed. In the absence of any further information regarding his whereabouts, his date of death was recorded in his SOE personnel record as May 8, 1946 (a year after hostilities ceased in Europe). Byerly is listed on memorials at Gross-Rosen, the Valençay SOE Memorial in France, and at Brookwood Memorial in England.

== Notes ==
- As stated above, Byerly's SOE personnel record lists his death as May 8, 1946 but the Canadian Virtual War Memorial lists his date of death as May 8, 1945.
- Byerly is listed on the SOE memorial at Gross-Rosen, where he is presumed to have been executed, however SOE expert Nigel Perrin cites a possibly contradictory deposition from the commandant of the Sicherheitsdienst in Paris, Josef Kieffer, which stated that Byerly was transported to Rawicz, and an unverified claim from a prisoner that he met him at Flossenbürg concentration camp in Germany.

== See also ==
- List of people who disappeared
