= Muriel Byck =

- Born: 4 June 1918; Ealing, London, England
- Died: 23 May 1944 (aged 25); Romorantin, now Romorantin-Lanthenay, France
- Military career
- Allegiance: United Kingdom; France
- Branch: Special Operations Executive; French Resistance
- Service years: 1942–1944
- Rank: Field agent and guerrilla commander
- Nicknames: Michéle, Violette
- Commands: Ventriloquist
- Conflicts: World War II
- Awards: Mentioned in Dispatches

Muriel Byck (4 June 1918 – 23 May 1944) was an agent of the United Kingdom's clandestine Special Operations Executive (SOE) organization in France during World War II. She died of meningitis.

== Early life ==
Muriel Tamara Byck was the daughter of French Jews, Luba Basia (née Golinska) and Jacques Itzko Byck, who had both taken British nationality. She was born in London.

Her SOE file revealed that from 1923 to 1924 she had lived with her family in Wiesbaden, Germany. The family must have moved to France in 1926 as she went to school at the Lycee de Jeunes Filles, St Germain, France, before moving to England in 1930 as Byck attended the Lycee Francais in Kensington, London, SW7, where she took the Baccalaureate in 1935 and then proceeded to the University of Lille.

Byck worked as a secretary from 1936 to 1938 in London before becoming an Assistant Stage Manager at the Gate Theatre in 1937. At the outbreak of war, she joined the Red Cross as a voluntary worker and the WVS. She moved to Torquay in 1941 where she worked as National Registration Clerk and was also an ARP Warden.

== WAAF and SOE mission ==
Muriel joined the WAAF in December 1942 as a General Duties clerk (Service number 2071428) working in the records office, later being promoted to the rank of Section officer. As she spoke excellent French, she was recruited into the SOE in 1943. She began initial training in September 1943 at Winterfold House, Cranleigh, in Surrey. From here she proceeded to para-military training at Meoble Lodge, Morar, Inverness-shire until October and wireless operator training at Thame Park, Oxfordshire in November and December 1943. She was chosen by French resistance leader Philippe de Vomécourt to be his wireless operator.

Byck was graded 'average' as a General Agent by her SOE instructors, but gained a high intelligence rating (eight out of nine), and high grades for Morse and Mechanical Aptitude. She was described by her instructors on her SOE file as:

a quiet, bright, attractive girl, keen, enthusiastic and intelligent. Alert but not very practical and as yet lacks foresight and thoroughness. She is, however, self-possessed, independent and persistent, and warm in her feelings for others... a girl of considerable promise who will require much training to help her to overcome her lack of experience, her complete ignorance of what the work really involves and her general guilelessness. Her temperament would appear to be suitable for work as a courier, or possibly propaganda.

After three aborted attempts to fly from Tempsford airfield, Byck parachuted into France on the night of 8/9 April 1944 with three other SOE agents: Captain Stanisław Makowski, Captain C. Sydney Hudson - who was her commanding officer until de Vomecourt arrived by plane - and Captain G. D. Jones. She worked on the SOE Ventriloquist network (or circuit) as the wireless operator and to train any wireless operators recruited locally and inform London with the details about these new recruits so they could be given code names and status. Byck was additionally tasked with establishing post-boxes for contact should wireless transmission break down. Her codename was Violette.

Byck lodged at a safe house in the town of Salbris owned by French Resistant Antoine Vincent. She sent her transmissions back to England from a shed behind a garage in Limoges where German trucks and cars came in for repairs. While at this location, she aroused the suspicion of a German soldier, but by the time the local Gestapo returned Byck had moved to a new location. She changed her cover story, posing as a Parisian secretary on sick leave; to disguise her night time activities sending messages through to London, she said she had to take medicine every few hours even at night. She later moved again to the home of a blacksmith in Vernou.

== Death ==
Byck worked long hours as a wireless operator, so fatigue was expected. However, when she collapsed at the blacksmith's house and lost consciousness, she required urgent medical attention. De Vomécourt took her to a doctor known to the resistance; he diagnosed meningitis and told them that hospitalisation was her only chance. This posed a problem as the Germans kept a check on hospital admissions and scrutinised the papers of all people entering. The cover story devised was that Byck and de Vomécourt (as her uncle) were evacuees from Paris. Byck was admitted to the hospital in Romorantin, now Romorantin-Lanthenay, which was run by nuns. She was given a lumbar puncture, but died shortly afterward on 23 May 1944, aged 25.

She was buried in Romorantin and for many years her grave was tended by the local people. The townsfold of Romorantin commemorated the Anniversary of her death as a heroine of the Resistance. Later, her grave was moved to the Pornic War Cemetery.

== Legacy ==
Muriel Byck was posthumously Mentioned in Despatches for her conduct, and she is commemorated on the FANY St Paul's Knightsbridge Memorial and the Valençay SOE Memorial, as well as the war memorial at the Lycee Francais in Kensington. A plaque in her memory, with an unusual Hebrew inscription from the Book of Joshua, was unveiled on the wall of the house where she lived in Torquay for some years, in 2014, by The Torbay Civic Society and AJEX, represented by historian Martin Sugarman. She is also named on the war memorial on Torquay promenade. Muriel's long lost colour tinted photograph, and her sweetheart WAAF badge (both kept by her mother after Muriel died) were discovered at the home of her mother's friend, Mrs Krish, who had been bequeathed them in Mrs Byck's will; Mrs Krish died in London in 2013 and the items were donated to the Jewish Military Museum in Camden. Apparently, Mrs Byck ordered Muriel's medals destroyed after her death; they have never been seen in any case.

By viewing the web site of Cathie Hewitt, 'Remembering Jews of WW2' readers may see the moving poem about Muriel.

1939–1945 Star	France and Germany Star	War Medal with Mentioned in Dispatches
