= Blanche Charlet =

SOE operative

- Born: Valentine Blanche Charlet; 23 May 1898; Westminster, London, England
- Died: 11 October 1985 (aged 87); Camden, London, England
- Military career
- Allegiance: United Kingdom; France
- Branch: Special Operations Executive; French Resistance
- Service years: 1942–1944
- Rank: Field Agent
- Nickname: Christiane
- Commands: Ventriloquist
- Conflicts: World War II
- Awards: Member of the Order of the British Empire

Valentine Blanche Charlet MBE (23 May 1898 – 11 October 1985), code named Christiane, served in France as an agent for the United Kingdom's clandestine Special Operations Executive (SOE) during World War II. The purpose of SOE was to conduct espionage, sabotage and reconnaissance in occupied Europe against the Axis powers. SOE agents in France allied themselves with French Resistance groups and supplied them with weapons and equipment parachuted in from England. Charlet was a courier. She was arrested and imprisoned by the Germans occupying France but escaped and returned safely to England.

== Background ==
Charlet was born in London of Belgian parents on 23 May 1898. As an adult she managed an art gallery in Brussels. When Nazi Germany invaded Belgium in May 1940, she fled to England. She joined the Women's Transport Service. Her fluency in French brought her to the attention of the SOE. Her English was only "passable". She never married.

== SOE ==
Forty-four years old when she joined the SOE, Charlet was one of oldest of the agents who worked for SOE's F (French) Section. She was described as small, dark-haired, attractive, and lively. She trained with the first group of SOE F Section female agents, Andrée Borrel, Yvonne Rudellat, and Marie-Thérèse Le Chêne, and herself. Because of her age she was not given parachute training, but instead landed by a felucca converted to military use on the French Riviera in Vichy France on 1 September 1942. Until 11 November 1942, Vichy France was not occupied by Nazi Germany, but collaborated with the Germans. SOE agents were in danger of arrest from both the French police and the Germans.

After landing, Charlet traveled to Cannes, but her contact there had been arrested. Knowing nobody else, she proceeded northward to Lyon to meet another contact, Virginia Hall, who she was scheduled to replace. Instead, Hall directed her to the Ventriloquist Network headed by Philippe de Vomécourt. Charlet's first task was to find a safe house from which wireless operator Brian Stonehouse could transmit and receive messages. She found a house to rent in Feyzin, a southern suburb of Lyon and thereafter served as a courier between Vomécourt and Stonehouse. Charlet and Stonehouse were arrested on 24 October 1942 while he was sending a wireless message to SOE headquarters in London. Charlet blamed herself for Stonehouse's arrest as she had seen German wireless detector vans in the area, but failed to tell Stonehouse. While in custody, she reportedly attempted to kill herself.

== Incarceration and escape ==
Many SOE agents were tortured and executed after their arrests, but Charlet under interrogation proved adept at portraying herself as a vacuous woman ignorant of politics, concocting elaborate stories about lovers and fainting when under pressure from her interrogators. In November 1942, she was sentenced to incarceration in Castres prison in southern France. The prison, run by the French, was lax about security. On 16 September 1943, at least 37 of the prisoners escaped. Charlet and the other prisoners had obtained pistols and keys to the cells and the guards were locked up or deceived. The escapees broke up into small groups, Charlet and Suzanne Warenghem, a young French woman who had been a courier for the Pat O'Leary Escape Line (and married to British soldier and turncoat Harold Cole), remaining together. Charlet and Warenghem reached open country and, helped by a local farmer, took refuge in a Benedictine monastery. There they sheltered in a guest house for two months before the monks took them to an escape line which helped people flee France by walking across the Pyrénées mountains to Spain. Heavy snow prevented them from crossing the mountains.

Having failed to cross into Spain, Charlet and Warenghem, now in touch with SOE headquarters in London, undertook a cross country saga. First, they journeyed to Paris and then to Lyon. Charlet was worried she might be recognized in Lyon and traveled to the Jura Mountains near the border of Switzerland to work as a courier and guide for SOE. In April 1944, SOE arranged for Charlet and Warenghem to escape from France. To do so, they crossed France again to Brittany where they were picked up on a beach by a small boat, and rowed offshore to a motor torpedo boat, a dangerous operation as the Germans were fortifying the French coast in anticipation of an Allied invasion. During their escape they were fired on, but their boat outraced German pursuers and they arrived safely in Plymouth on 20 April 1944.

== Honours and awards ==
On 19 February 1946 Charlet was appointed a Member of the Order of the British Empire (MBE) by King George VI for "services in France during the enemy occupation."
