= Alix d'Unienville =

British spy

- Born: Alix Marrier d'Unienville; 8 May 1918; Vacoas-Phoenix, Mauritius
- Died: 10 November 2015 (aged 97); Paris, France
- Military career
- Allegiance: United Kingdom, France
- Branch: BCRA & SOE, French Resistance
- Service years: 1943–1944
- Rank: Field agent and resistance operative
- Nickname: Agent Myrtil/Marie-France
- Commands: SOE RF Section networks

Alix Marrier d'Unienville, MBE (8 May 1918 – 10 November 2015) was a French-British agent in the Free French (RF) Section of the Special Operations Executive (SOE), during World War II.

== Biography ==
D'Unienville was born in Mauritius to a wealthy French aristocratic family who moved back to France when she was six. She was brought up in a château near Vannes in Brittany. She held dual French and British citizenship. After managing to escape to England in 1940, she was employed writing propaganda leaflets at the Free French headquarters at Carlton Gardens, London before the Bureau Central de Renseignements et d'Action recruited her and directed her to the SOE for training.

Commissioned into the Women's Auxiliary Air Force, she began her SOE training in June 1943, passing through the special training schools at Beaulieu. On 31 March 1944, she parachuted into Loir-et-Cher from a Halifax aircraft with millions in francs for the Gaullist delegate-general to distribute. Adopting the alias Aline Bavelan, her cover story was she was born on the island of Réunion in 1922, moved to France in 1938 to study and was now the wife of a prisoner of war.

She worked in Paris, known by the codename Myrtil to the intelligence-officers & signallers in London, and the codename Marie-France to her colleagues in the Resistance. She was successful until 6 June 1944 when she was arrested with "Tristan" (Pierre-Henri Teitgen) outside Le Bon Marché in Paris. She was taken to Avenue Foch for interrogation and was searched. They found and took away her cyanide pill. She was held in Fresnes prison in solitary confinement. She pretended to be mentally ill to escape from Fresnes and to be transferred to Saint-Anne hospital. This plan was foiled by the Gestapo, who transferred her to La Pitié, a place associated with brutal atrocities of the Gestapo.

D'Unienville, by once again eating and talking, was able to get herself transferred briefly to Saint-Anne, and then to the prison camp at Romainville, where she and another woman, Annie Hervé, hatched a plan to escape over the walls using a rope they made out of black curtains. The attempt was abandoned when Hervé was deported to Germany.

She was in the last convoy to be sent from Romainville towards Germany, but she was able to escape when the prisoners were sent across a road bridge over the Marne because the rail bridge had been destroyed by Allied bombing. She was then able to hide in two villages before being liberated by the Americans, whereupon she was able to return to Paris.

After the war d'Unienville was employed as a war correspondent for US forces in south east Asia before she worked as an air hostess for Air France and became a writer of fiction and nonfiction.

== Bibliography ==
Books which have been written by Alix d'Unienville include the following:

1. Nuit et jour : Le grand hebdomadaire illustré (1944)

2. En vol : journal d'une hôtesse de l'air (1949)

3. La Chaîne d'amour (The loving spirit) (1950)

4. Les Mascareignes, vieille France en mer indienne (1954)

5. Images de l'île Maurice (1954)

6. Qui es-tu ? (1957)

7. Hôtesse courageuse (1959)

8. Le Point zéro (1961)

9. La fête secrète (1975)

10. Le Trésor de Dieu (1976)

11. L'amour dans l'âme (1995)

12. Printemps fragiles (2016)

== Decorations ==
D'Unienville was appointed a Military Member of the Order of the British Empire (MBE) by the British government. She was awarded the Legion d'honneur and the Croix de Guerre by France.

Member of the Order of the British Empire	1939–1945 Star	France and Germany Star	War Medal
Légion d'honneur (Chevalier)		Croix de Guerre (France)	

== Sources ==
- Binney, Marcus (2012). The Women Who Lived for Danger. Hodder & Stoughton. ISBN 978-1-4447-5643-2.
