= Bob Maloubier =

Robert Maloubier DSO MBE (2 February 1923 – 20 April 2015) was a French secret agent who worked for the British Special Operations Executive (SOE) in World War II. He received his training at Wanborough Manor in Surrey.

Following the war, Maloubier went on to become a founding member of the Service de Documentation Extérieure et de Contre-Espionnage (the French Secret Service). He also designed one of the world's first modern diving watches, when he saw the need for one that could be seen in muddy waters. He took his and Claude Riffaud's drawings to Blancpain, who then created its Fifty Fathoms watch that had a water resistance guaranteed for 91.45 metres (300.0 ft).
