= Ralph Beauclerk =

Captain Ralph Beauclerk
- Arms of Beauclerk, marqueses de Urría
- Born: Raphael Charles Beauclerk; 10 August 1917; Surrey, England
- Died: 4 April 2007 (aged 89); London SW19
- Education: Downside School
- Occupation: Merchant banker
- Employer: HSBC
- Political party: Conservative
- Spouse: Noirine Bowen (m. 1957)
- Children: 1 son, 1 dau
- Parent(s): William Beauclerk (1864–1950); Lola de Peñalver (1881–1972)
- Military career
- Allegiance: United Kingdom
- Branch: British Army
- Service years: 1939–1945
- Rank: Captain
- Service number: 297759
- Units: Intelligence Corps; SOE (F Section)
- Conflicts: World War II; French Resistance
- Awards: MBE

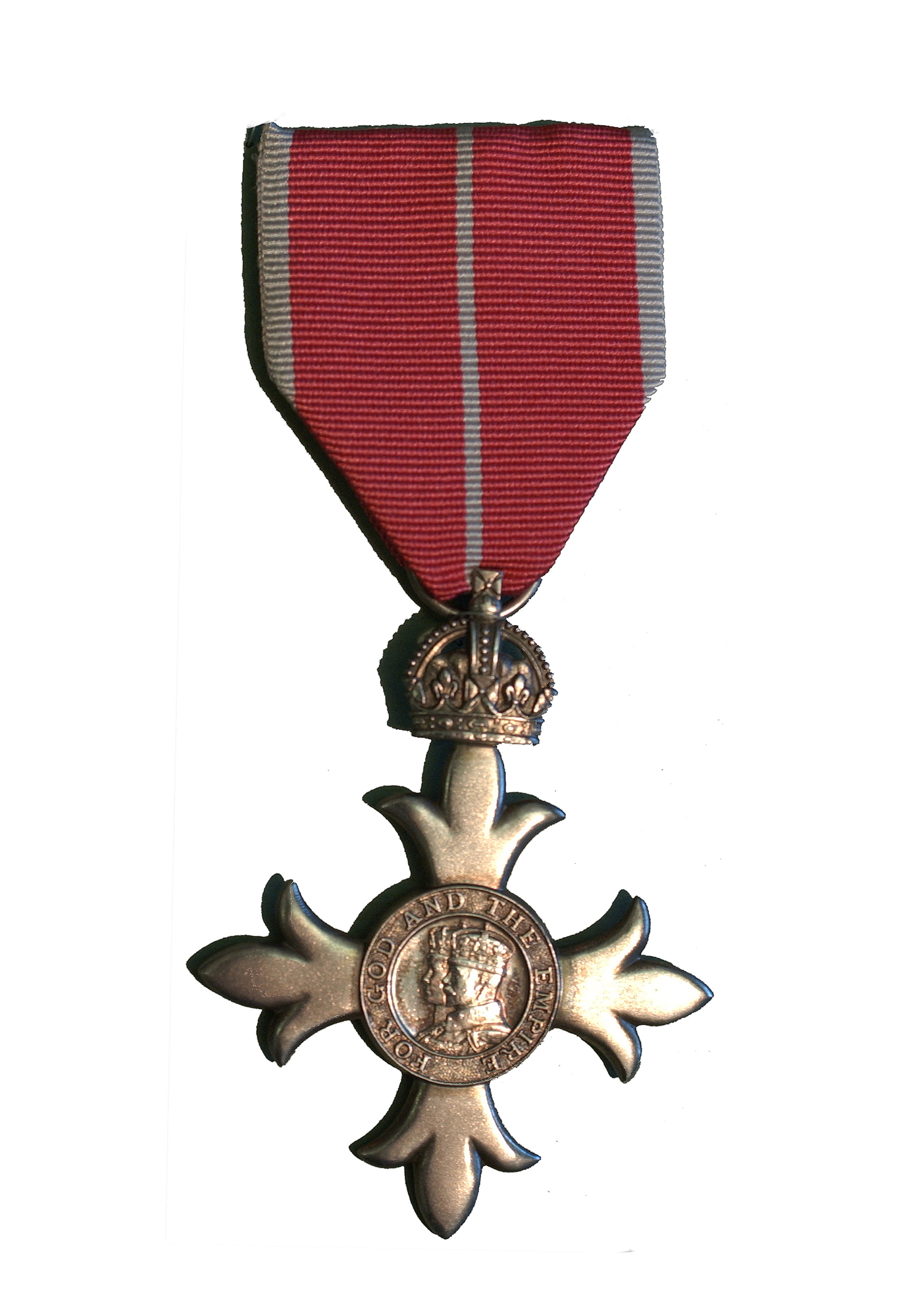
MBE insignia

Raphael Charles Beauclerk, better known as Ralph Beauclerk, MBE (1917–2007), VI marqués de Valero de Urría, was an upper-class British Army officer and secret agent, decorated for his WWII service with the Special Operations Executive (SOE).

== Background and early life ==
Of Spanish noble and English aristocratic descent, Beauclerk was via his father in remainder to the dukedom of Saint Albans, later succeeding as marqués de Valero de Urría (cr. 1852), when his mother's title was revived in his favour in 1989.

His father William Topham Sidney Beauclerk MInstCE (grandson of Charles George Beauclerk MP, only son of Topham Beauclerk by his wife Lady Diana Beauclerk (née Spencer), son of Lord Sidney Beauclerk PC MP) was a civil engineer in the Argentine who, in 1910, married Dolores (aka Lola) de Peñalver y Zamora (1881–1972), V condesa de Peñalver later VII marquesa de Arcos.

His mother, the only surviving child of Enrique de Peñalver y Zamora, VII marqués de Arcos and María Zamora y Pérez de Urría, daughter and heiress of María Pérez de Urría y de la Cuesta, II marquesa de Valero de Urría (by Rafael Zamora y Quesada), succeeded to her family titles.

Beauclerk was educated first at Downside School, Somerset, then at Bayonne in France, becoming a fluent linguist.

== Military service and later life ==
Commissioned into the Intelligence Corps at the outbreak of WWII, Beauclerk served in France on attachment to the SOE, being promoted Captain.

During World War II, code named Casimir, Beauclerk worked as an agent for the clandestine British Special Operations Executive (SOE), conducting espionage, sabotage and reconnaissance in Nazi-occupied Europe. SOE agents allied themselves with French Resistance maquis and supplied them with weapons and equipment.

After his distinguished military service, Beauclerk joined Hong Kong and Shanghai Merchant Bank working in Asia until 1970 and then with the Banque Privée de Luxembourg.

In 1989, the Spanish marquisate of Valero de Urría devolved upon Beauclerk; among his cousins was the Marchioness of Cárdenas de Montehermoso, with kinsmen including the Duke of St Albans and the Duchess of Alba.

== Personal life ==
On 24 August 1957 at Saigon, Vietnam, Beauclerk married Noirine Mary Bowen (died 20 January 1997), daughter of James Bowen, of Bowen's Court, County Cork; the Marquis and Marquesa had two children:

- Dolores Mary Beauclerk (born 11 Jul 1958), married Dr Richard Makower and has three children.
- William Raphael Beauclerk (born 14 Aug 1961), was educated at Worth School, commissioned in the Royal Navy serving on HMY Britannia and promoted Lieutenant, elected FRICS; after his father's death he succeeded as the 7th Marquis de Valero de Urría. He married in 1986 Margaret Eleanor Mountjoy, having a daughter and two sons:
  - Charlotte Mary Beauclerk (born 24 July 1987)
  - Alexander Charles Beauclerk (born 11 February 1990)
  - Cameron William Beauclerk (born 25 March 1993).

Capt Beauclerk's granddaughter, doña Charlotte Beauclerk, is heiress apparent to the marquisate and her younger brothers are in remainder to the dukedom of Saint Albans. His son, the present Marquis and Marquesa de Valero de Urría live at Médan, near Paris.

== Honours and decorations ==
The 6th Marquis de Valero de Urría's distinguished services were recognised by being appointed :

- : Member of the Order of the British Empire (MBE);
- : Légion d'honneur;
- : Croix de guerre;
- : Knight of Malta (SMOM).

== See also ==
- Dukedom of St Albans
- Marquisate of Valero de Urría
