= Roméo Sabourin =

Canadian WWII soldier and spy (1923–1944)

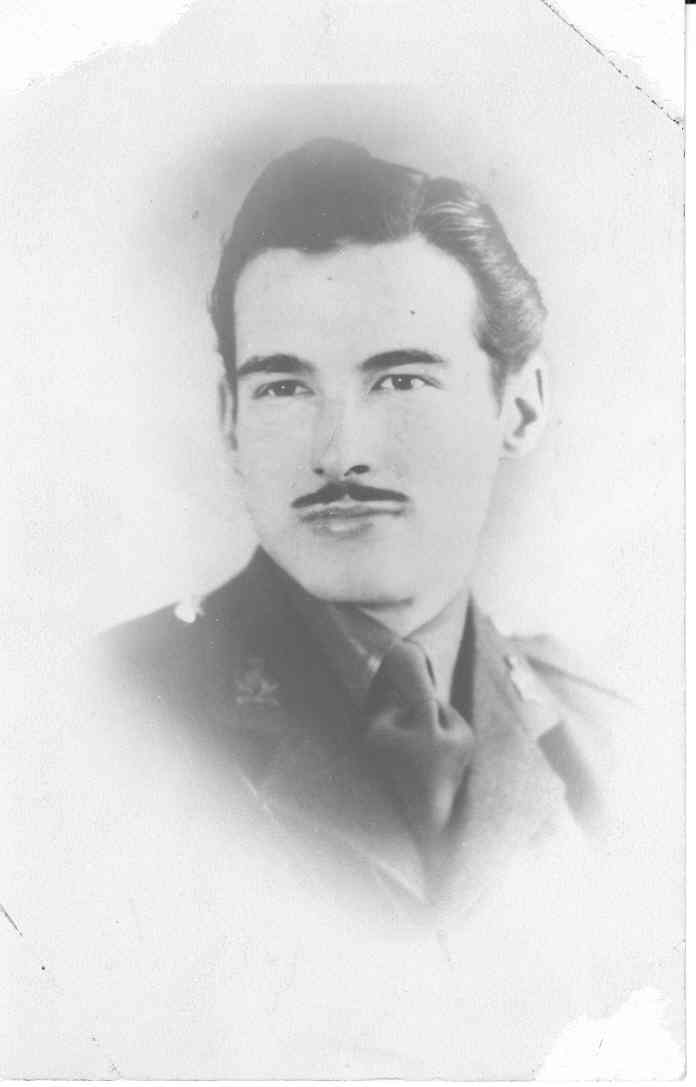
- Born: January 1, 1923; Montreal, Quebec, Canada
- Died: September 14, 1944 (aged 21); KL Buchenwald, Weimar, Germany
- Military career
- Allegiance: Canada; United Kingdom
- Branch: Canadian Intelligence Corps; Special Operations Executive
- Service years: 1940–1944
- Rank: Lieutenant
- Conflicts: World War II

Lieutenant Roméo Sabourin (January 1, 1923 – September 14, 1944) was a Canadian soldier and spy during World War II.

== Biography ==
Born in Montreal, Quebec, Sabourin joined the Canadian Army, serving in the Canadian Intelligence Corps. Because of his training and fluency in both the French and the English languages, he was recruited into the Special Operations Executive (SOE).

From London, he was parachuted into occupied France where he worked with the French Resistance, but was captured by the Gestapo with members of the Robert Benoist group and shipped to Buchenwald concentration camp on August 27, 1944.

Twenty-one-year-old Roméo Sabourin was executed by the Nazis on September 14, 1944, along with two other Canadian SOE agents, Frank Pickersgill and John Kenneth Macalister.

Lieutenant Sabourin is honored on the Groesbeek Memorial in the Groesbeek Canadian War Cemetery in the Netherlands. As one of the SOE agents who died for the liberation of France, Lieutenant Sabourin is listed on the "Roll of Honor" on the Valençay SOE Memorial in the town of Valençay, in the Indre département.

== See also ==
- List of SOE agents
