= Georges Duboudin =

French SOE agent

Émile Georges Jean Duboudin (May 23, 1907 – March 22, 1945) was a French Special Operations Executive agent during the Second World War.

== Early years ==
Émile Georges Jean Duboudin was born in France on 23 May 1907, the son of George and Adelna Duboudin. He married an English woman named Elizabeth Trumble, and lived in London.

== Wartime ==
He joined the Special Operations Executive, Section F, as a captain.

=== First mission ===
On the night of 19/20 September 1941 Georges Duboudin "Alain" landed by boat at Barcarès, near Perpignan, and went to Lyon to train to organise the SPRUCE network to supervise sabotage teams.

In January 1942 Peter Churchill arrived to give him instructions from SOE headquarters and give him 300,000 francs.

In April 1942 Virginia Hall assigned him radio operator Edward Zeff, who had arrived in the French Riviera by submarine with Victor Gerson, an SOE agent on a special mission to organise the VIC Escape Line, delivered by Peter Churchill in Operation DELAY II.

On 28 May 1942 the first parachuting of arms in the Lyons region took place.

On 2 June 1942 Robert Boiteux was parachuted to Anse to assist him, but the two men did not get along. Bob Sheppard, who arrived on the same flight as an instructor, fell on a roof near the police station and was arrested. Jean Mingat, in charge of receiving Bob Sheppard, was also arrested and sentenced to 10 months in prison.

In October 1942 Duboudin was called back to London, and during the night of 26/27 October a Lysander flew him back to the UK, having handed over his network to Robert Boiteux. Francis Basin took over URCHIN.

=== Second mission ===
On the night of 23/24 March 1943 he was landed by Lysander near Compiegne to run the PLAYWRIGHT network, but was arrested a few days after his arrival and taken to the Mittelbau-Dora Concentration Camp, where he died of pleurisy on 22 March 1945, aged 37, as result of his mistreatment in captivity.

== Post-war ==
In 1965 his widow filed a claim for Nazi persecution under the Anglo-German Compensation Agreement.

== Recognition ==
- As one of the 104 SOE Section F agents who gave their lives for the liberation of France, Georges Duboudin is honoured at the Valençay Memorial (Indre).
- Brookwood Memorial, Surrey, panel 21, column 3.
