= Elizabeth Devereux-Rochester =

Elizabeth "Minnie" Devereaux-Rochester
- Born: 20 December 1917; New York City
- Died: 19 March 1983 (aged 65); Rennes, France
- Military career
- Allegiance: United Kingdom, France
- Branch: Special Operations Executive, French Resistance
- Service years: 1943-1944
- Rank: Field agent
- Nicknames: Elizabeth, "La Grande"
- Commands: Marksman
- Awards: Chevalier de la Legion d'Honneur, Croix de Guerre

Elizabeth "Minnie" Devereux-Rochester, also known as Elizabeth Reynolds, (20 December 1917 – between 1981 and 1983) was a member of the First Aid Nursing Yeomanry who served with the Special Operations Executive (SOE) in France during World War II and worked as a courier with the codename Typist (in French: "Dactylo") for the Marksman network (or circuit). The purpose of SOE was to conduct espionage, sabotage, and reconnaissance in countries occupied by Nazi Germany or other Axis powers. SOE agents allied themselves with resistance groups and supplied them with weapons and equipment parachuted in from England.

== Early life ==
The daughter of American parents, Aimee (Babe) Margaret Lathrop née Gunning Rochester Reynolds and Richmond Rochester, Jr.. She had one sister, Aimee Christine Gunning Rochester. Devereaux Rochester was educated by an English governess and at Roedean School in England. Her parents divorced and her mother married Myron Reynolds. Devereaux went by the name Rochester pre-dominantly, but seems to have also used Reynolds.

In the 1930s, she lived in Paris with her mother; when the Germans invaded France in 1941, she worked as a driver for the French Red Cross. She escaped France with a group leading several Jews into Switzerland. She became one of the leaders of the group and was later asked to return to France and work with the French Resistance. She led several downed pilots across the border to Switzerland until that route had to be closed. For this group she developed a new escape route across the Pyrénées.

== Special Operations Executive ==
She joined the Special Operations Executive (SOE) in early 1943. Following training, she landed in a Hudson aircraft on 18 October 1943 in France with Richard Heslop (organiser of the Marksman circuit, codename "Xavier"), a radio operator, Owen Denis Johnson, and an RF agent of Charles de Gaulle, Jean Rosenthal. Heslop described Rochester as very English in appearance. "She did not walk, she strode...you automatically expected to see a couple of Labradors at her heels...She stuck out like a sore thumb." But, he added, "She did a fine job for she had guts and imagination."

In Spring 1944, Heslop reluctantly requested that Rochester be recalled by SOE to England, as she "looked so like an Englishwoman" that he and the French leaders were apprehensive that she would be captured by the Germans. The capture of one member of a network would endanger the other members as the captured member might reveal details of the network under interrogation and possibly torture. Heslop blamed SOE for recruiting an agent who looked so "un-French." She left the Marksman circuit, but didn't return to England and instead went to Paris to see her mother. She was arrested on 20 March 1944 in Paris. She was held at the Fresnes Prison, then transferred to the Vittel Internment Camp, where she stayed until liberation.

== Honours and awards ==
She was awarded the Legion of Honour; and the Croix de Guerre by France.

1939–1945 Star	France and Germany Star	War Medal
Légion d'honneur (Chevalier)	Croix de Guerre (France)	

== Later life ==
Following the war she lived in Paris and worked in advertising for the Vel d'Hiv. Devereux Rochester inherited money from Jane Stanford a former California Governor's wife. Stanford's niece Mrs. Amy Hansen, had adopted Devereux Rochester, as well as her sister. Upon Stanford's death, Stanford University tried to contest the adoption as invalid so that the money would not be bequeathed and would instead be given back to the university. The case was finally won by the heirs 21 September 1957. Shortly after, Devereux-Rochester was diagnosed with multiple sclerosis. She lived her later years in Dinard in Brittany until her death. She was never married.
