= Philippe de Vomécourt =

French SOE agent (1902-1964)

- Born: 16 January 1902; Chassey-lès-Montbozon, France
- Died: 20 December 1964 (aged 62); Paris, France
- Relatives: Pierre de Vomécourt (brother)
- Military career
- Allegiance: France/United Kingdom
- Branch: Special Operations Executive,
- Service years: 1941–1944
- Nicknames: Gauthier, Antoine
- Unit: Ventriloquist
- Awards: Croix de Guerre, France, Distinguished Service Cross, United States

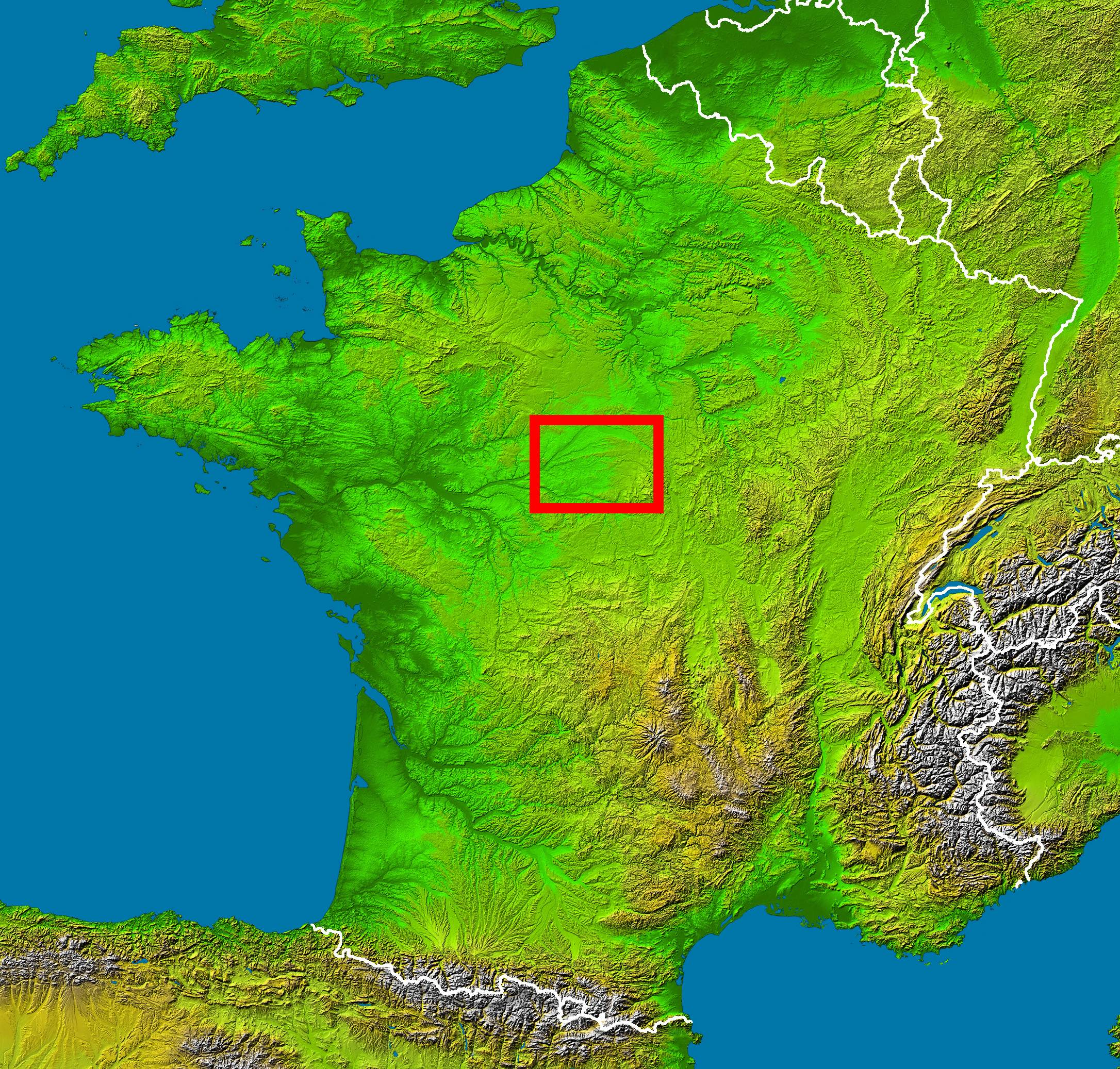
De Vomécourt operated primarily in the Sologne region of France

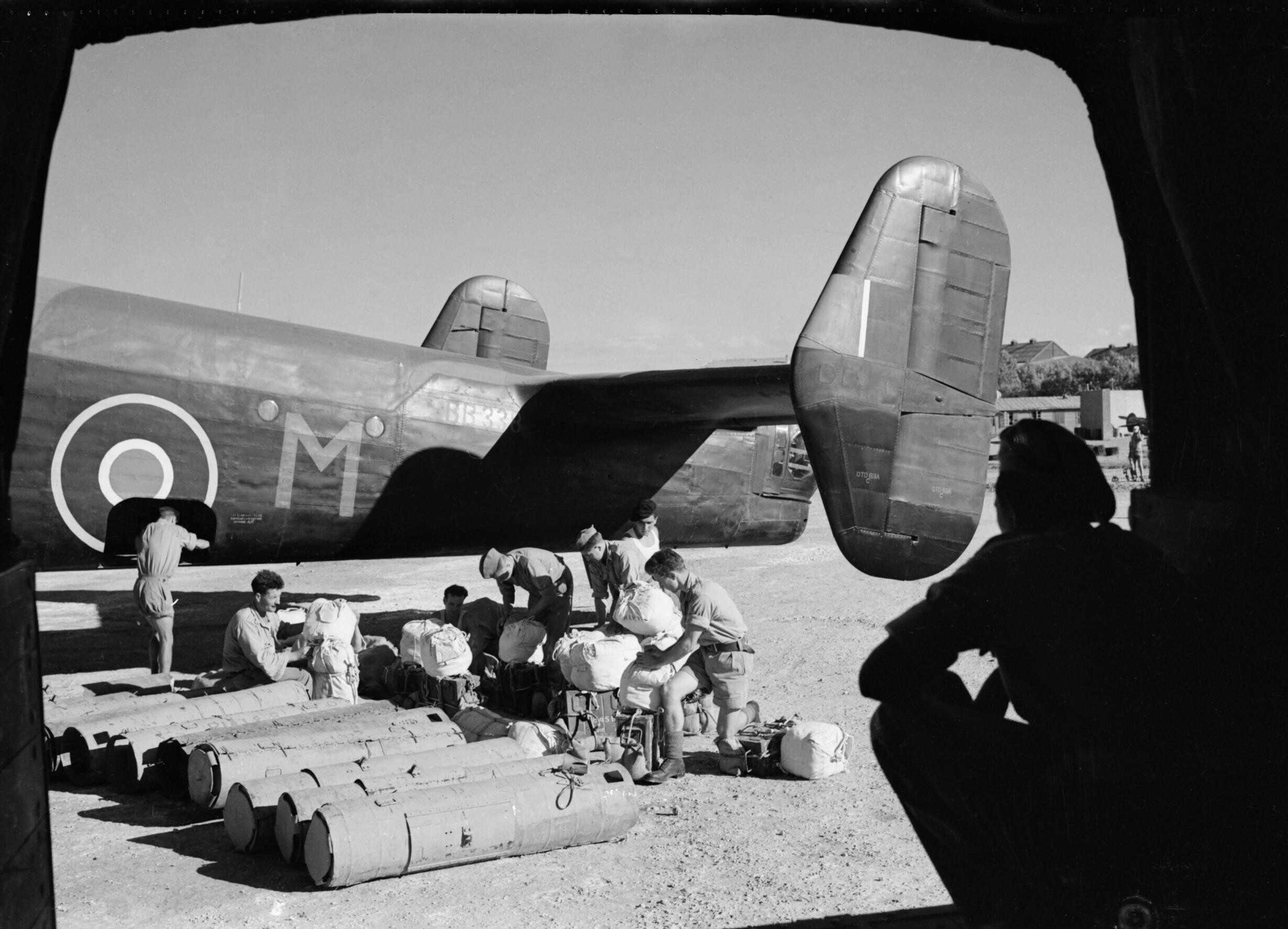
CLE canisters ready to be loaded on to Handley Page Halifax B.II Series I (Special), SOE BB338.

Had all of us in France meekly, lawfully carried out the orders of the German master, no Frenchman could have ever looked another man in the face. Such submission would have saved the lives of many -- some very dear to me -- but France would have lost its soul.

— Philippe de Vomécourt

Philippe Albert de Crevoisier, Baron de Vomécourt (16 January 1902 – 20 December 1964), code names Gauthier and Antoine, was an agent of the United Kingdom's clandestine Special Operations Executive (SOE) organization in World War II. He was the organiser (leader) of the Ventriloquist network (or circuit) from May 1941 until the liberation of France from Nazi German occupation in September 1944. The purpose of SOE in occupied France was to conduct espionage, sabotage and reconnaissance. SOE agents allied themselves with French Resistance groups and supplied them with weapons and equipment parachuted in from England. The primary area of Vomécourt's activity was in the Sologne region about 160 kilometres (99 mi) south of Paris. Philippe's older brother Jean and younger brother Pierre were also members of the French Resistance.

Vomécourt was controversial. Author Sonia Purnell is critical of Vomécourt, but acknowledges that he was one of "the biggest legends of the Resistance." A colleague in the Resistance, Col. Vésine de la Rüe, said Vomécourt "was the real organizer, the undisputed leader of the resistance in Sologne, and the main, if not the only distributor of weapons." Pearl Witherington, the SOE leader in an adjacent district, called Vomécourt a "wily fox of an agent." On the adverse side, the official historian of the SOE, M.R.D. Foot, said that Vomécourt's book, An Army of Amateurs, was "a sometimes exaggerated account of his activities." He added that de Vomécourt had "magnetic qualities of personality" and "attracted storms." The American SOE agent Virginia Hall had as little contact as possible with Vomécourt as she considered him careless about security and full of grandiose plans.

Summing up the pluses and minuses, author Peter Hore's comment about another controversial figure in the Resistance, Mary Lindell, applies also to Vomécourt: he resisted the German occupation of France for more than three years unlike many of the French who joined the Resistance only when it became clear that Germany was losing the war.

== Early life ==
Vomécourt was born to a distinguished French family. He had two brothers, Jean and Pierre. He was educated at Beaumont College in Old Windsor, England. He was too young to serve in the military in World War I. After the war, he lived and worked in Africa for 10 years. In 1929 he married Geneviève de Vanssay de Blavous. The couple had seven children. In 1939, at the beginning of World War II, Vomécourt was living on his estate of 120 hectares (300 acres) in Saint-Léonard-de-Noblat in Haute-Vienne Department. Due to his age and large family he was not mobilized as a soldier for the war.

== World War II ==
=== First airdrop ===
Vomécourt was recruited in May 1941 by his brother Pierre to work for the Special Operations Executive which was headquartered in London. On June 13, 1941, SOE airdropped two CLE Canisters into Bas Soleil, Vomécourt's estate 15 kilometres (9.3 miles) east of Limoges, France. The canisters were dropped by an Armstrong Whitworth Whitley bomber and contained sub-machine guns, explosives, and other materials. Wireless operator Georges Bégué arranged for the airdrop. These canisters were the first of nearly 60,000 canisters loaded with supplies and arms which SOE air-dropped to agents and resistance groups during World War II.

This first airdrop was not without mishap. The drop came only after four days of waiting and expectations and the reception committee at the drop site was only two persons, Vomécourt and a young man named Gabie. One of the canisters landed more than a mile from the drop site. A full canister can weigh up to 160 kilograms (350 lb) and with great difficulty the two men dragged and carried the canisters and their contents overland to Vomécourt's villa and hid them among rhododendron bushes. The next morning Vomécourt heard excited farmers speculating about the airplane they had heard the night before. To allay suspicions from himself, he reported the airplane to the French police and they came to his estate and looked around the fields, finding nothing.

=== Growing pains ===
With aristocratic aplomb, the three Vomécourt brothers divided among themselves the responsibilities for resistance to the German occupation. Oldest brother Jean, focused on eastern France near his chateau at Pontarlier. Philippe worked south of the Loire River in the Sologne region, mostly in Vichy France which was unoccupied by Germany until November 1942. Pierre based himself in Paris and worked in northern France.

The first year of SOE operations in southern France did not go well for SOE. De Vomécourt recruited Henri Sevenet for the Resistance but the arrest of a dozen SOE agents in October 1941 and the feckless CARTE network of André Girard (in which SOE had placed great hopes) adversely impacted the fledgling SOE resistance networks. Vomécourt was of little help in attempting to create order out of confusion. He told SOE that he wanted arms and money, and "not more of London's incompetents" parachuted into his region. As a sign of his displeasure, he delayed meeting a pair of newly-arrived SOE agents for seventeen days while they slept in ditches. To the contrary, the SOE agents believed that Vomécourt was "bluffing' by claiming that he had thousands of men waiting to be armed and trained when in fact he had only a handful.

=== Arrest and escape ===
Vomécourt was arrested by French police near Limoges on 13 November 1942. The police told him they had arrested him to save him from the Gestapo and they registered him as Philippe de Crevoisier to conceal his identity. He was sentenced to 10 years imprisonment. In July 1943, along with 200 other men he was transferred to Eysses prison in Villeneuve-sur-Lot in southwestern France. On 3 January 1944, Vomécourt was one of 53 prisoners to escape from Eysses. The prison was in the area of the SOE's Wheelwright network led by George Starr. Starr's explosives expert Claude Arnault and courier Anne-Marie Walters helped the escapees cross the Pyrenees into neutral Spain. Vomécourt arrived in England on 8 March.

=== Return to France ===
In England, Vomécourt was commissioned as a Major and given a few weeks training. He returned to France by Westland Lysander airplane on the night of April 9/10, 1944 landing near Châteauroux. He had a new code name Antoine and a work name of "St. Paul," St. Paul being the name of one of the prisons where he had been incarcerated. With his team he undertook a number of sabotage missions. One of the most noteworthy was the coordination of an air attack on a German arsenal named Michenon near the town of Salbris on May 7. Vomécourt's intelligence enabled the Royal Air Force (RAF) to bomb the arsenal while trains loaded with munitions were present. His men blew up bridges and destroyed railroads to isolate the arsenal. He also notified French workers in advance of the bombing to stay away from the arsenal. The bombing was successful in destroying much of the arsenal.

Seven RAF Lancasters were shot down by the Germans during the raid and Vomécourt's men rescued some of the survivors and got them on their way toward safety in neutral Spain via escape lines. Vomécourt's sabotage activities were not without casualties to his subordinates. His overworked wireless operator, Muriel Byck died in May 1944 of meningitis and his second-in-command, Polish-born Stanislaw Makowski, died after being captured and tortured by the Germans in August 1944.

=== Surrender of a German army ===
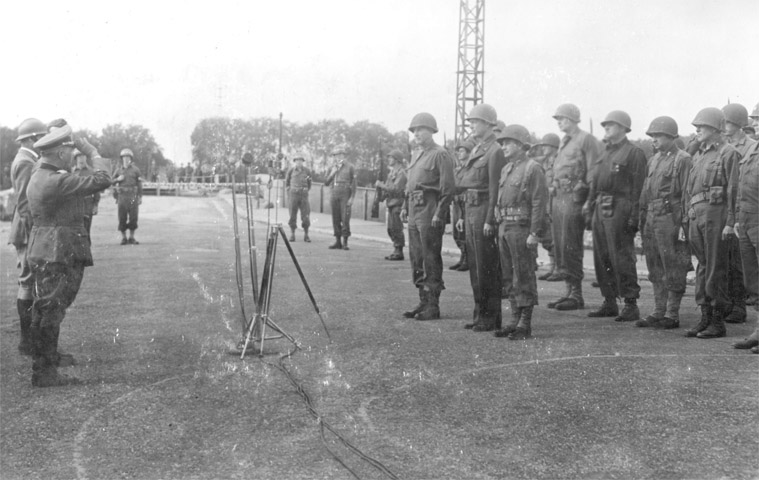
German general Elster (left) surrenders to American forces, September 16, 1944.

In early September 1944, German forces under General Botho Elster were retreating northward from southern France, attempting to join forces with German forces retreating from Normandy. The Germans were threatened every step of the way by French resistance groups, now called the French Forces of the Interior (FFI). Realizing that he was unable to join with other German forces, Elster proposed to surrender to the American army, not wishing to soil his military reputation by surrendering to the irregular forces of the resistance and fearing that the resistance forces might seek revenge on his troops after a surrender. Elster negotiated a surrender agreement with American General Robert C. Macon. The Germans were separated from the American army by 100 kilometres (62 miles) with the intervening territory controlled by the FFI forces. Macon agreed that the Germans would keep their small arms and march unopposed through the FFI territory to Beaugency where the surrender ceremony would take place.

Vomécourt opposed the agreement and he traveled overland for 300 kilometres (190 mi) to the headquarters of American General George S. Patton to attempt to have the terms of the surrender re-negotiated. Vomécourt feared the proposed march of the Germans through FFI territory would become violent and that the terms of the German surrender violated the "unconditional surrender" policy of the allies. Vomécourt said Patton agreed with him and gave him a letter delaying the movement of the German soldiers until new terms could be negotiated. During his return to the FFI forces, Vomécourt was injured in an automobile accident and consequently was delayed and unable to deliver the letter to General Macon in time to stop the German's armed march through FFI territory. When he arrived at Macon's headquarters, Macon refused to see him.

As it turned out, the march proceeded without violence and the formal surrender of nearly 20,000 Germans to the Americans took place on September 16, 1944. The French resistance forces were furious that they had been excluded from the negotiations and the surrender. To add insult to injury, French civilians "who had next to nothing" looked on as the Americans distributed rations and luxuries to the German soldiers and the Germans destroyed their arms and equipment, much of it stolen from French civilians. American flags were torn down and outraged letters were published in local and national newspapers.

== Return home ==
In October 1944, Vomécourt returned to his home, his wartime service over. His wife had not heard from him for six weeks and thought he was dead. The messages he had asked SOE to deliver to her were not delivered. He spent two days at home and then departed to join the United Nations Relief and Rehabilitation Administration to help the millions of people who had been displaced in the war.

Philippe de Vomécourt's brother Jean had been captured and executed by the Germans during the war. His brother Pierre had also been captured by the Germans, but was treated as a prisoner of war and survived.
