= Thiers Foundation =

French fund to support early-career researchers

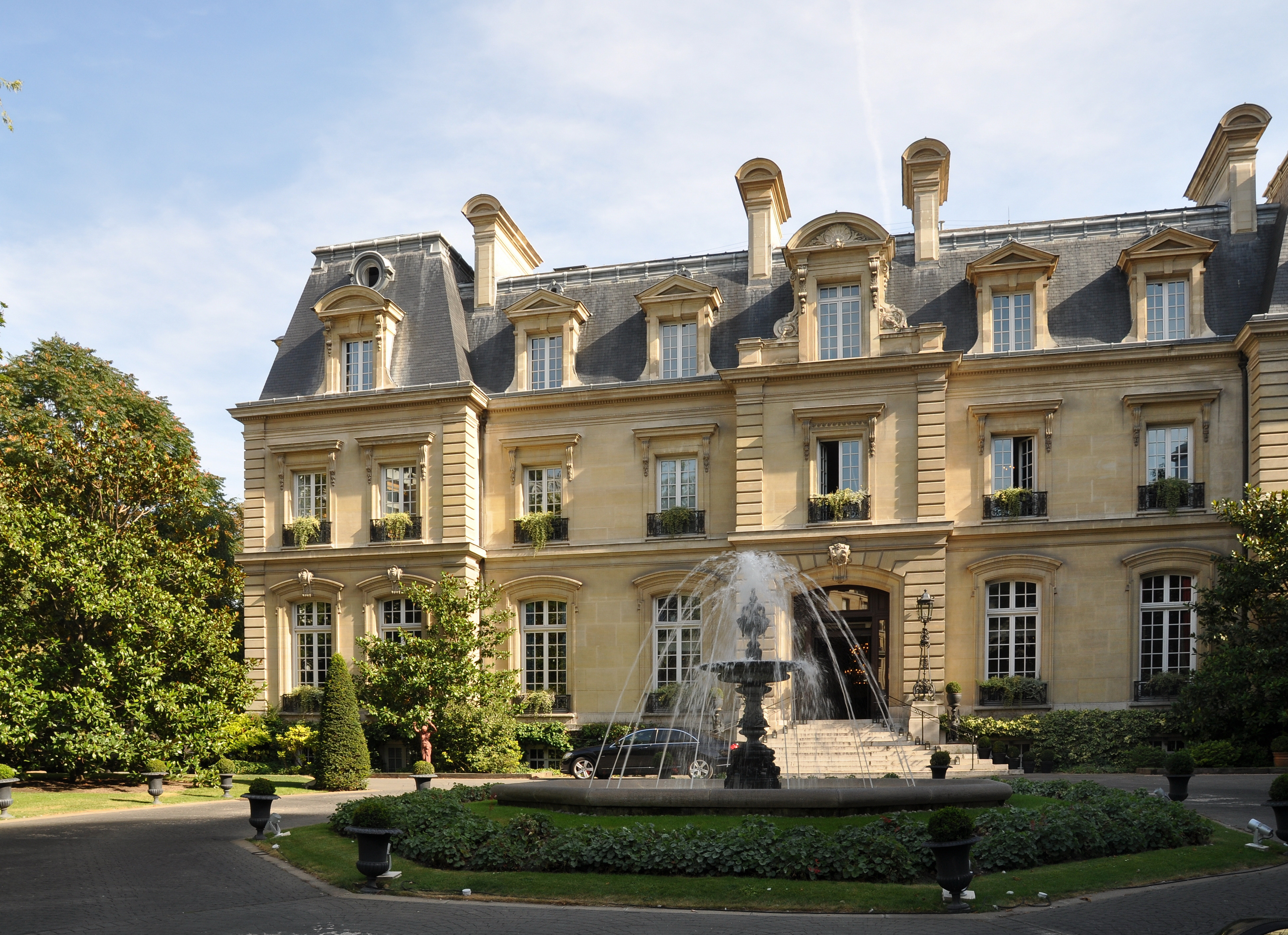
The Foundation's current site

The Thiers Foundation (French: Fondation Thiers) is a French institution which aims to help the early careers of promising young researchers. It is now based at 5 place du Chancelier-Adenauer in the 16th arrondissement of Paris.

It has awarded grants to figures including Jean Tulard, Louis Gernet, André Aymard, Marc Bloch, Charles Blondel, Jean Guitton, René Étiemble, Georges Bonnefoy, Daniel Villey, Maxime Chastaing, Maurice Duverger, Jacques Rancière, Daniel Defert, Michel Foucault, José Grosdidier de Matons, Pascal Ory, Pierre de Labriolle, Guy Pervillé, Lise Queffélec, Olivier Wieviorka, Pierre Nora, Marc Fumaroli, Dominique Janicaud, Jean Ebersolt, André Crépin and Émile Giraud.

== History ==
On 1 May 1893 the Conseil d'État recognised the foundation as a public utility and accepted the donation from Madamoiselle Dosne to set it up. She was sister-in-law to the former president Adolphe Thiers and allocated 120,000 francs to its upkeep. It was then attached to the Institut de France. In 1903 a specialist library was added to the foundation for use by its past and present grant recipients.

Its grant recipients are now part of the humanist research circles of the Institut de France, as is the Association des anciens pensionnaires et amis de la fondation (friend and alumni association). It recruits from the most talented university students, who are funded by the CNRS for three years. The contract with the CRNS has not been renewed since 2017 and no grant recipients have been recruited since that date, though those recruited in 2016 were able to complete their theses with CNRS funding until the contract ended in 2019. Currently only one-year scholarship can be awarded. Every two years the foundation awards a prize for the best works by former grant recipients.

== Former home ==
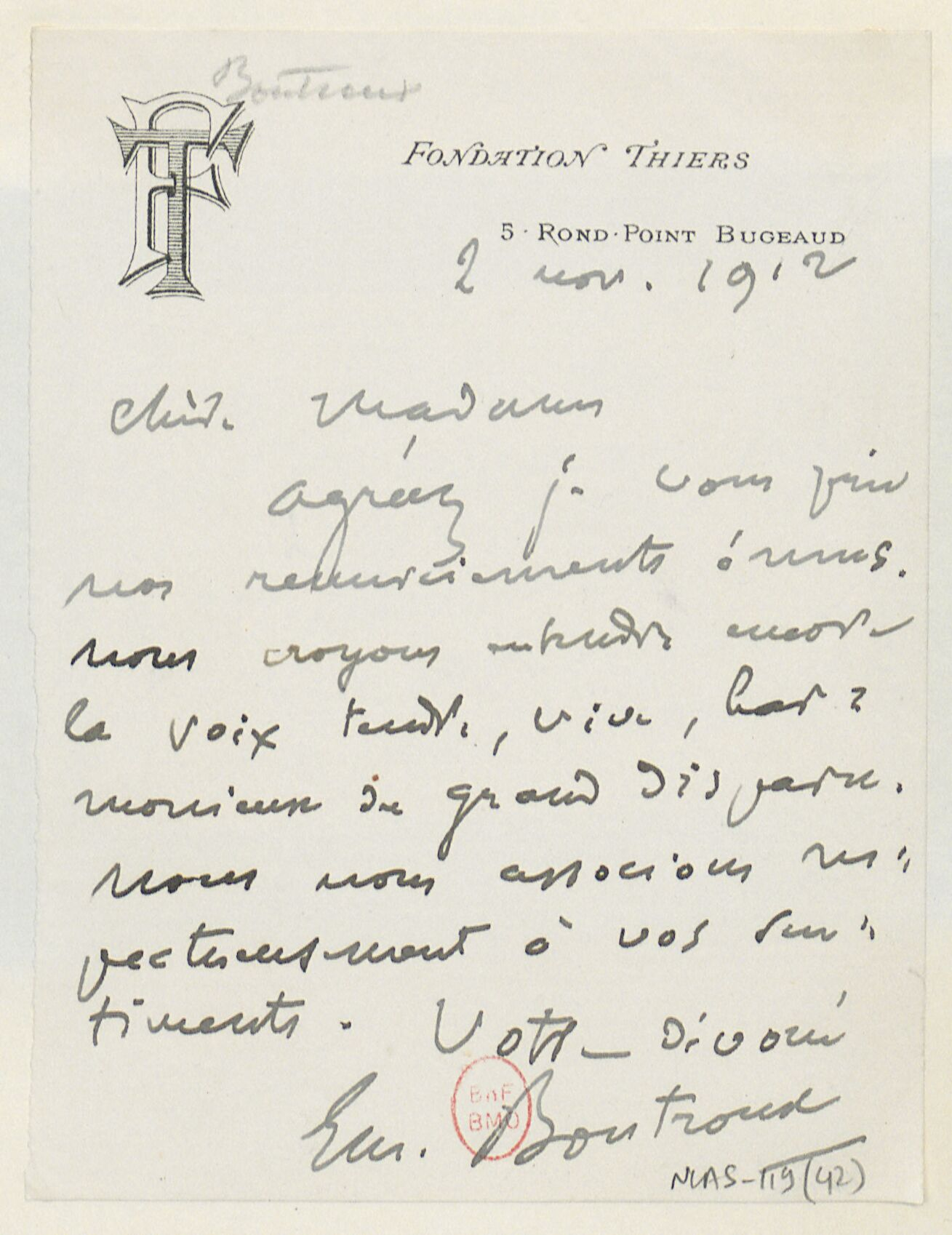
Letterhead of the Thiers Foundation, 1912

For most of its history recipients of the foundation's grants were housed for three years in the hôtel particulier on rond-point Bugeaud (now place du Chancelier-Adenauer) in Paris.

The building had been built in 1890–1892 by the foundation's founder, in Paris' 16th arrondissement on the edge of the bois de Boulogne between l'avenue Foch and avenue Victor-Hugo, on the site of Paris' first aerodrome, which served hot air balloons. In December 1889, a journalist described the future place du Chancelier-Adenauer :

At the rond-point Bugeaud, forming a vast trapezoid with rue des Belles-Feuilles and rue Spontini, we note an estate closed in with fences, a sort of construction site, dotted with cut stones covered in snow and big bare trees. Promenaders are rare in this corner of Passy, populated by quaint little hotels, in the midst of which too many dilapidated hovels stand out

That "construction site" was that of the hôtel, built on land bought for almost nothing in 1826 by Alexis Dosne, Thiers' father-in-law. The architect was Aldroff.

She gave the building to the foundation a few years later to accord with the wishes of the former president's widow Élise, in order to house "a school intended to complete the scientific, historic and philosophical education of particularly gifted young people". It was in a bad state by 1986, when the Institut de France sold it off, and now houses Saint James Paris, a luxury hotel.

== Bibliography ==
- (in French) Pascal Ory, « Le premier siècle de la Fondation Thiers », in Fondation Thiers : Annuaire 1893–1993, Paris, Association des anciens pensionnaires et amis de la Fondation Thiers, 1993, 116 p
