= Germaine Guérin =

French brothel owner and Resistance sympathizer

- Born: Lyon, France
- Occupations: Brothel owner, French resistant
- Known for: Allied collaboration

Germaine Guérin (French pronunciation: [ʒɛʁmɛn ɡeʁɛ̃]) was a brothel owner and a French Resistance sympathizer during the Vichy regime. She was part of Virginia Hall's spy network that operated in Lyon, France. Along with the gynecologist Jean Rousset, she helped Hall save Jews, Allied pilots, spies, radio operators, and refugees during the Second World War.

== Biography ==
Little is known about Guérin's life and background except for accounts chronicling her life as a "madam", an owner of a popular brothel in Lyon. She was described as a brunette who wrapped herself in jewels, silks, and furs. She lived in an apartment above her business, which was located in a backstreet of the city, an area now occupied by the offices of the National Treasury of France.

=== French Resistance ===
When Virginia Hall was assigned in France to establish resistance networks, she was given a list of names she could contact by an Allied pilot, Flight Lieutenant Simpson. Guérin was on the list, and the two women first met at the former's salon in the winter of 1942. The 37-year-old Guérin was already part of the French resistance movement; she was known for harboring Jews forced into hiding.

Guérin's brothel was popular among German soldiers, enabling her to extract information through the prostitutes she employed. Guérin also helped undermine the Nazis by spreading sexually transmitted diseases among her German patrons. She used forged white cards that authorities used in their efforts to prevent the spread of such diseases. With the help of gynecologist Rousset, she manipulated identification documents so that infected girls were presented as disease-free.

After Hall fled France, Guérin continued to help resistance fighters, providing them food and shelter. She was later arrested after she was betrayed by Father Robert Alesch, a French Nazi collaborator who posed as Rousset's associate. It was also Guérin who introduced several of Hall's colleagues to Alesch, leading to their arrests. These included Monsieur Genet and two collaborators whom Hall identified in her correspondence as the "Siamese twins".
