= Jacques Legrand =

Jacques Legrand may refer to:

- Jacques Legrand (writer) (c. 1350–1422), French writer of the Arts de seconde rhétorique, also known as Jacobus Magnus
- Jacques Legrand (philatelist) (1820–1912), French philatelist
- Jacques Legrand (resistance leader), French Resistance leader
- Jacques Legrand (Mongolist) (born 1946), French linguist and anthropologist
