= Victor Hugo station =

Metro station in Paris, France

Victor Hugo
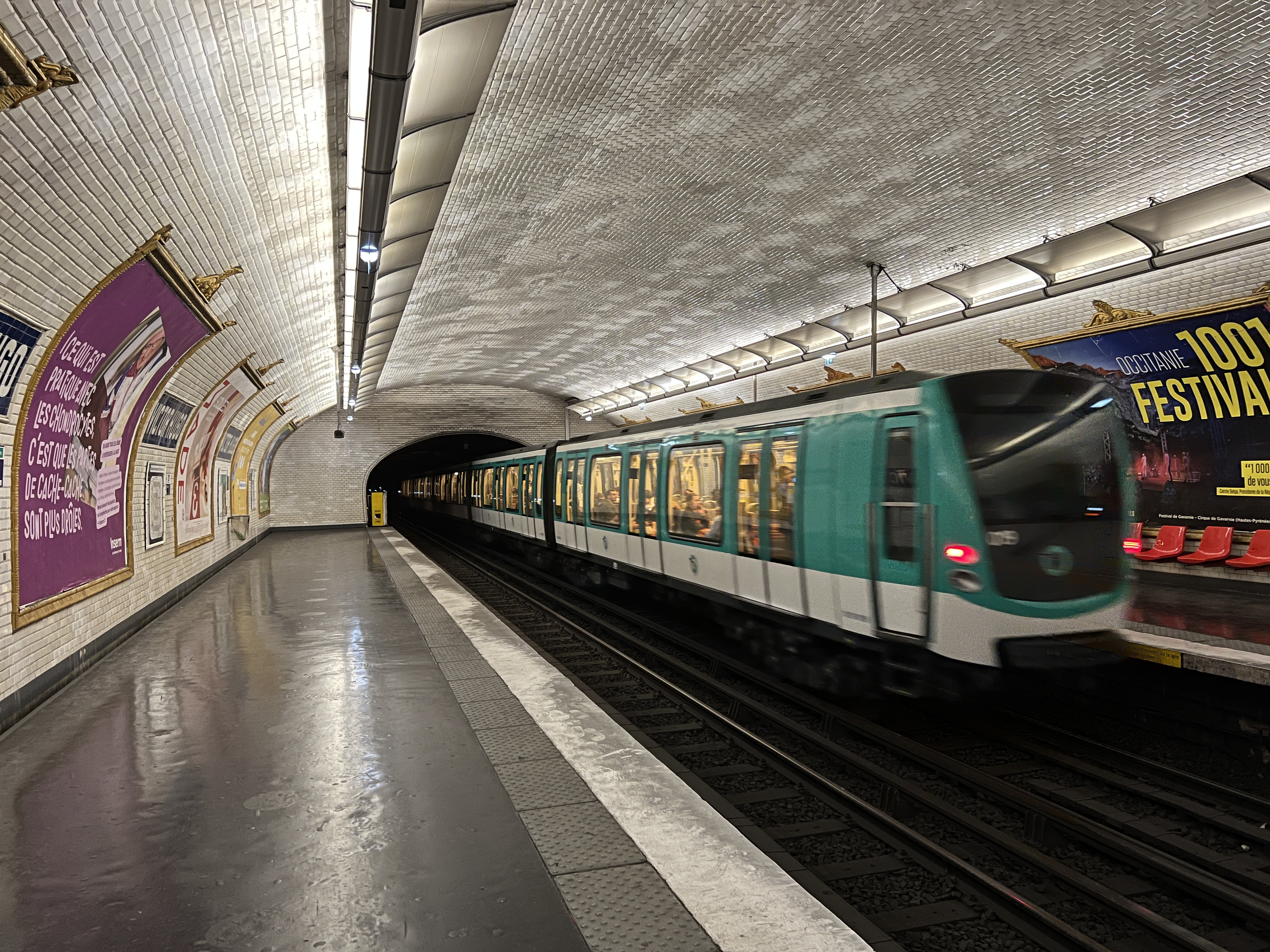

General information
- Location: 2, pl. Victor Hugo; 4, pl. Victor Hugo; 16th arrondissement of Paris; Île-de-France; France
- Coordinates: 48°52′11″N 2°17′06″E
- Owner: RATP
- Operator: RATP

Other information
- Fare zone: 1

History
- Opened: 12 December 1900

Services
Preceding station	Paris Metro	Following station
Porte Dauphine Terminus	Line 2	Charles de Gaulle–Étoile towards Nation
Location
- Location within Paris

Victor Hugo (French pronunciation: [viktɔʁ yɡo]) is a station on Paris Métro Line 2. It is named after the author Victor Hugo, and located directly underneath Place Victor Hugo in the 16th arrondissement of Paris.

== Location ==
The station, located between the western terminus of Porte Dauphine and the Charles de Gaulle - Étoile station, is located northeast of Place Victor-Hugo, and has a stopping point replacing an old abandoned station, their platforms established at:

- for the old abandoned station, in a marked curve under the square, along the axis of Avenue Bugeaud and Avenue Victor-Hugo;
- for the current station, under Avenue Victor-Hugo, northeast of the original location.

== History ==
When first opened in 1900 as part of line 2 Nord, the platforms were built on the tight bend between Avenue Victor Hugo and Avenue Bugeaud. However, when new rolling stocks were introduced in 1930, the curve of the track was too tight for people to board and alight safely on these new trains. So, the station was rebuilt closer to Charles de Gaulle – Étoile (at the time named Étoile) on the straight stretch of track immediately after the curve.

The original station is clearly visible from the end of the platforms and remains accessible to staff. It still features some of the original flat tiles that were first in use on the network and have now almost entirely disappeared.

As part of the RATP Renouveau du métro revival program, the station corridors and platform lighting were renovated on 17 September 2002.

In July 2018, after the France national football team won the 2018 FIFA World Cup, the station was temporarily renamed Victor Hugo Lloris after captain and goalkeeper Hugo Lloris.

In 2019, 3,841,033 travelers entered this station which placed it at the 128th position of metro stations for its usage.

It owes its name to its location under Place Victor-Hugo and Avenue Victor-Hugo, which pay homage to Victor Hugo (1802-1885), French poet, playwright, prose writer, novelist and draftsman, considered to be one of the most important French-language writers.

== Passenger services ==
=== Access ===
The station has two entrances leading to Place Victor-Hugo:

- entrance 1 - Avenue Victor-Hugo, consisting of a fixed staircase adorned with a Guimard entrance classified as a historic monument by a decree of 29 May 1978, located northeast of the square, at the angle formed by the eponymous avenue and Rue Léonard-de-Vinci;
- entrance 2 - Avenue Raymond-Poincaré, consisting of an ascending escalator allowing only an exit from the platform in the direction of Porte Dauphine, located north of the square, at the corner with Rue Léonard-de- Vinci and Avenue Raymond-Poincaré.

=== Station layout ===
G	Street Level
M	Mezzanine for platform connection
P	Platform level
P	Side platform, doors will open on the right
P	Platform 1	← toward Porte Dauphine (Terminus)
P	Platform 2	toward Nation (Charles de Gaulle–Étoile) →
P	Side platform, doors will open on the right

=== Platforms ===
Victor Hugo is a standard configuration station. It has two platforms separated by the metro tracks and the vault is elliptical. The decoration is of the style used for most metro stations. The lighting canopies are white and rounded in the Gaudin style of the renouveau du métro des années 2000 revival and, the bevelled white ceramic tiles cover the walls, the vault and the tympans. The advertising frames are in a faience honey color and the name of the station is also in faience, in the style of the original CMP, a unique case on line 2. The seats are in a Motte style red. The station is distinguished however by the lower part of its platforms which are vertical and not elliptical, except at the end on the Porte Dauphine side (where the accesses take place), which is located within the very end of the old platforms; it is therefore recognizable by its lower vault and the curvature of the platforms at the level of the tunnel exits.

The wall on the platform towards Nation has a niche fitted out as a small display window dedicated to Victor Hugo. It houses a particular bust in his likeness.

The abandoned old station, also of standard configuration but set in a steep curve, remains clearly visible to the passengers of the trains passing it. It is also possible to see it from the end of the platforms of the current station on the Porte Dauphine side.

=== Bus connections ===
The station is served by lines 52 and 82 of the RATP Bus Network.

== Nearby ==
- Fontaine de la place Victor-Hugo
- Église Saint-Honoré-d'Eylau

== Gallery ==
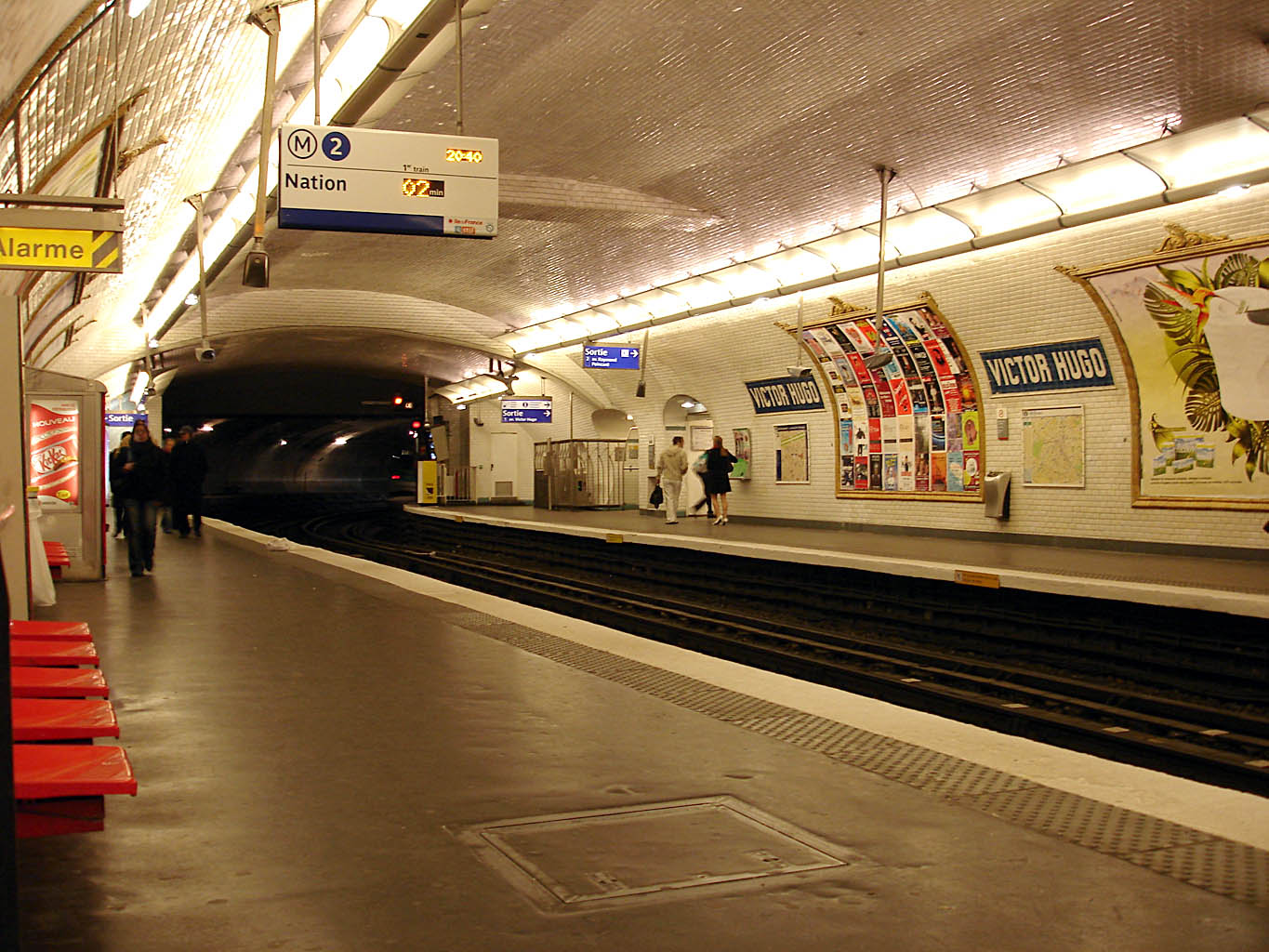
View towards Porte Dauphine

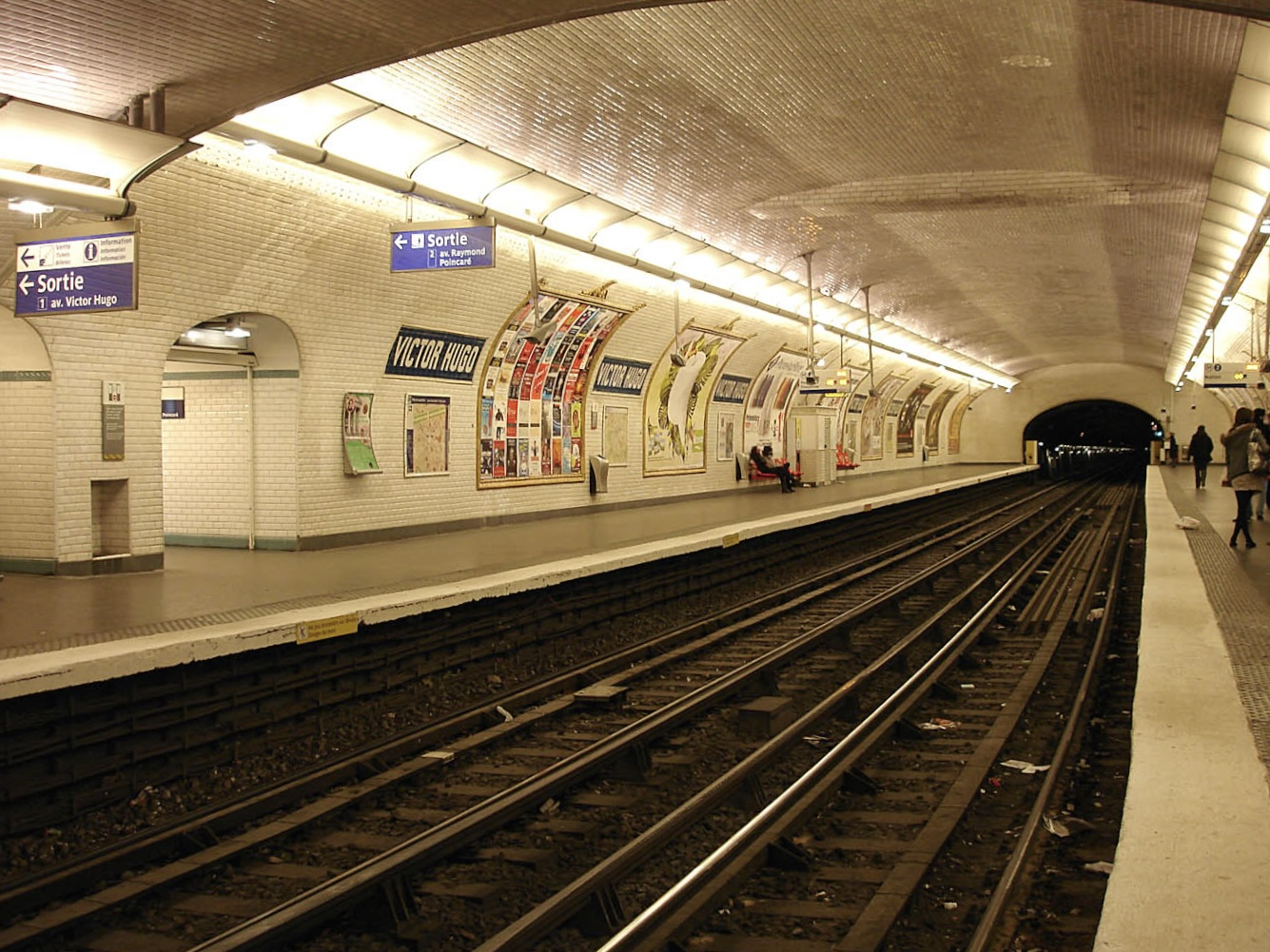
View towards Nation

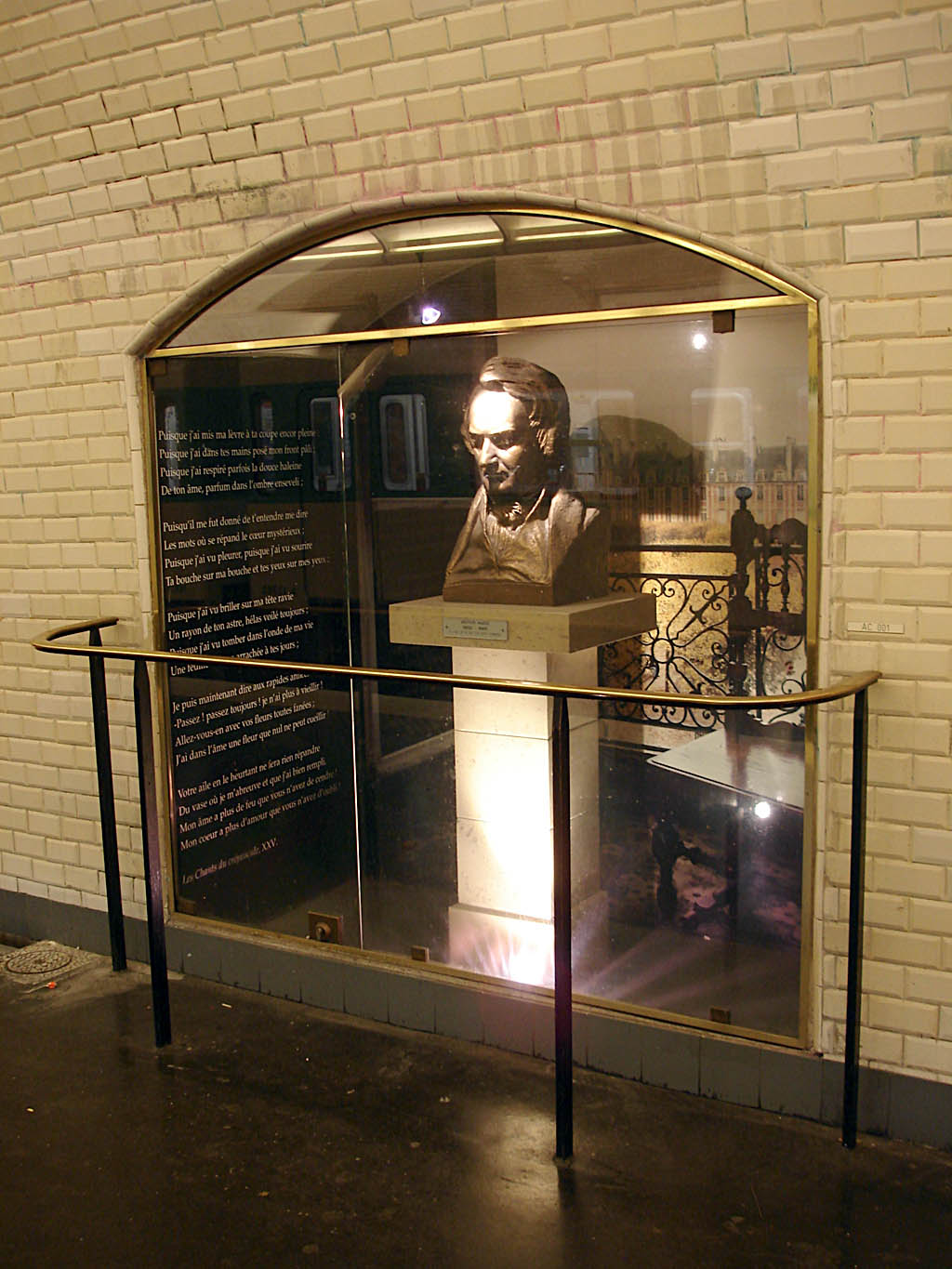
Sculpture of Victor Hugo

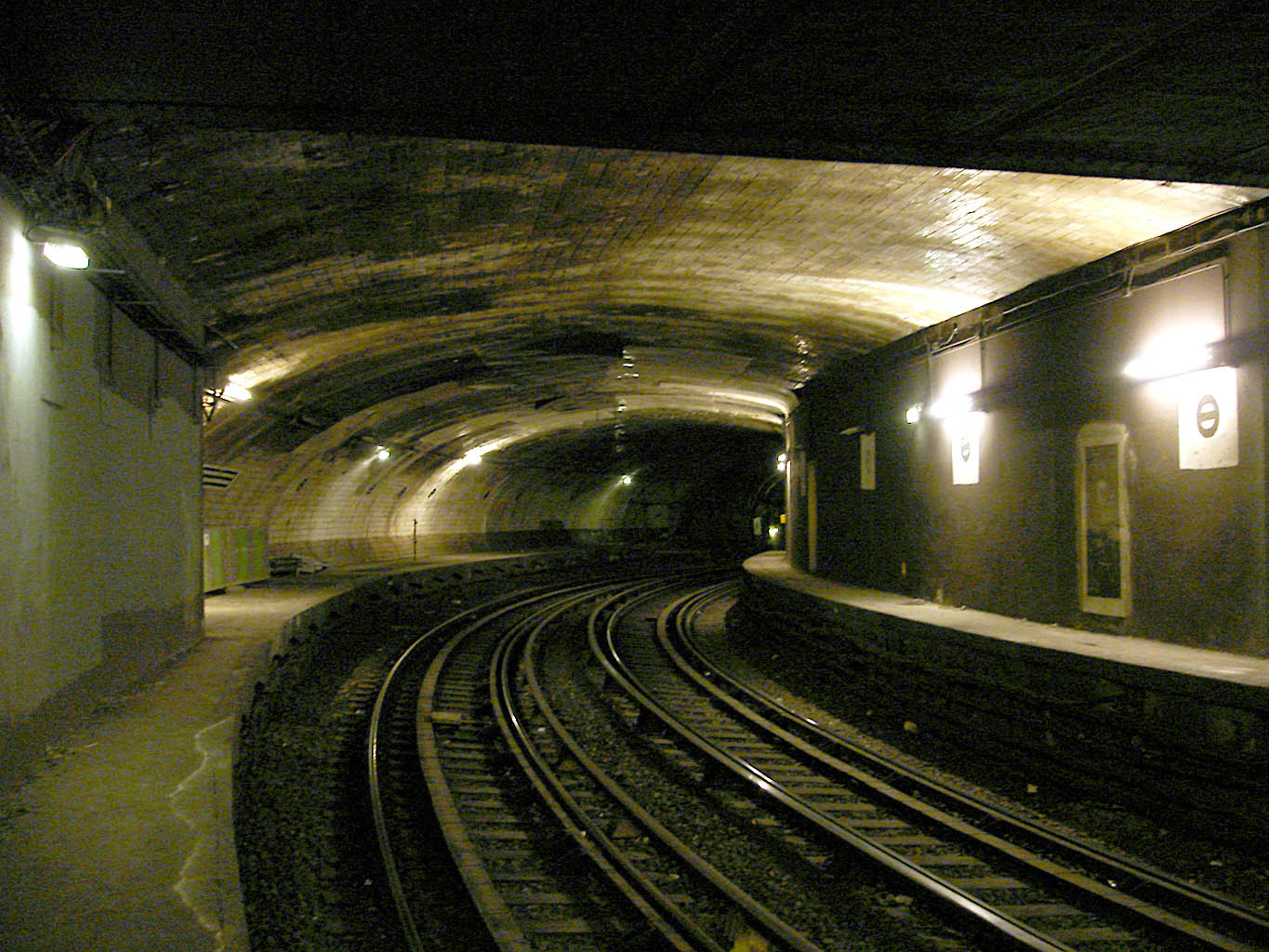
Abandoned platforms
