= Jacques Legrand (resistance leader) =

- Born: 24 October 1906; Douai
- Died: 30 June 1944; Mauthausen-Gusen concentration camp, Austria
- Organization: Réseau Gloria

Jacques Legrand (24 October 1906 – 30 June 1944) was a French Resistance leader and a chemical engineer at the Curie Institute in Paris.

== Pre-war life ==
Legrand was born in Douai, France on 24 October 1906. He worked as a chemical engineer at the Curie Institute in Paris. Legrand was an avid amateur sailor in his spare time prior to the war.

== World War II ==
Legrand joined the French Army in October 1939, following the outbreak of World War II. He served in an anti-aircraft battery during the Battle of France. Legrand was the co-founder of the Réseau Gloria along with Gabrielle Picabia and served as the leader of the network. Réseau Gloria operated during the German occupation of France during World War II with the primary task of gathering naval and maritime intelligence. The network was in touch with the British Secret Intelligence Service and with the Special Operations Executive (SOE). Legrand's codename with SOE was "Jack Tar" and he was referred to as "SMH" and "Bernard" within his own network. He mostly recruited academics and college professors for intelligence gathering within his network. Legrand and Réseau Gloria provided information, photographs, and maps to American Virginia Hall, among others. Among the members of Legrand's cell was Samuel Beckett, who served mostly as a courier. The network was infiltrated by Catholic priest and collaborator Robert Alesch in 1942.

=== Arrest and death ===
Acting on intelligence provided by Alesch, Legrand was arrested by the Germans on 13 August 1942, effectively ending the Réseau Gloria network. He was deported to the Mauthausen-Gusen concentration camp in Mauthausen, Austria where he later died in 1944.
