= Robert Alesch =

French-Luxembourgish priest, collaborator with Nazi Germany

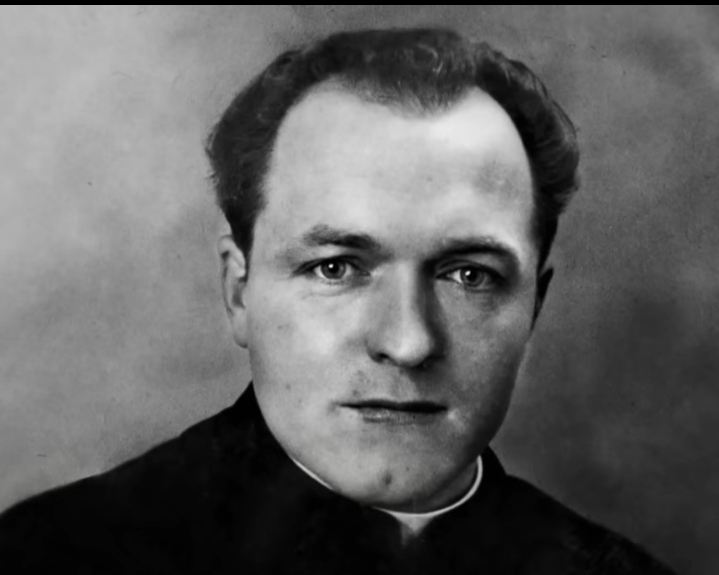
- Born: 6 March 1906; Aspelt, Luxembourg
- Died: 25 January 1949 (aged 42); Fort de Montrouge, Paris, France
- Cause of death: Execution by firing squad
- Occupation(s): Priest, collaborator
- Known for: Nazi collaboration

Robert Alesch (6 March 1906 – 25 January 1949) was a Catholic priest and collaborator with Nazi Germany during the Second World War.

== Biography ==
Alesch was born 6 March 1906 in Aspelt, Luxembourg. He claimed that his father was a Lorraine French patriot, who was tortured by the Germans in 1917.

=== Priesthood ===
Alesch relocated to Freiburg to study theology and was ordained in 1933 and settled in France in 1935. He was named vicar at La Varenne-Saint-Hilaire, parish of Saint-Maur, in the Paris region. From the beginning of the Nazi occupation, he passed himself off as an opponent of the Germans, particularly during his Sunday sermons. He saw the occupation, however, as an opportunity to earn money and offered his service to the Abwehr in 1941.

=== Collaboration with the Nazis ===
Alesch became an agent of the Abwehr, German intelligence organization. He gained entry into resistance circles and won the confidence of the ethnologist Germaine Tillion, who put him in touch with Jacques Legrand, the chief executive of the Réseau Gloria (Note: The Réseau Gloria was in touch with the British Secret Intelligence Service (SIS) and with the Special Operations Executive (SOE) britannique.) and with Gabrielle Picabia (whose nom de guerre was "Gloria") founder and head of the network.

Alesch was paid for his information by the Germans and lived a double life. Priest during the day, he lived with two mistresses on rue Spontini in the 16th arrondissement. On 13 August 1942, Legrand, Tillion and the main leaders of the network were arrested. Around 80 people found themselves imprisoned over the month of August. Detained in Fresnes Prison and Prison de la Santé, they were subjected to long interrogations and in some cases, torture, by the German police. After being moved to the camp at Fort de Romainville they were mostly deported to the concentration camps of Buchenwald, Mauthausen and Ravensbrück. Jacques Legrand, his second, Thomasson and a number of others did not return from deportation.

Alesch pursued his activities as double agent for the Nazis, encouraging young people to resist then delivering them to the occupiers. He was paid 12,000 Francs monthly, about the salary of a high-ranking officer at the time, and earned a bonus for each person he informed on.

His victims also included Virginia Hall, an American-born agent of the British intelligence service SOE. After worming his way into her confidence, Alesch discovered her section's activities in unoccupied southern France. In May 1942, as organiser of the Heckler circuit in Lyon, Hall agreed to have messages from the Gloria Network to be transmitted to SOE in London. Alesch infiltrated Gloria in August leading to its leadership being captured by the Abwehr. Alesch then made contact with Hall claiming to be an agent of Gloria and offering intelligence of apparently high value. She had doubts about Alesch, especially when she learned that Gloria had been destroyed, but was persuaded of his bona fides, as was the London headquarters of SOE. Alesch was able to penetrate Hall's network of contacts, including the capture of wireless operators and the sending of false messages to London in her name. Many of those captured did not survive.

After the war, Alesch fled to Brussels. He was handed over to the French authorities and tried by the Court of Justice (order of June 26, 1944) of the Seine department. The surviving members of the network, Tillion (who invoked the memory of her mother Émilie Tillion, murdered at Ravensbrück), Picabia and Pierre Weydert were also there to witness at the trial. Former Abwehr colleague Hugo Bleicher also testified against him.

Alesch was sentenced to death and held in Fresnes prison before being executed by firing squad on 25 January 1949 at Fort de Montrouge in Arcueil.

== Bibliography ==
- Archives Nationales (French).
- Beckett, James Knowlson, éditions Solin, Actes Sud (French).
- Knowlson, James (1996). Damned to fame: the life of Samuel Beckett. Simon & Schuster. ISBN 0684808722.
- Le témoignage est un combat, Jean Lacouture (a biography of Germaine Tillion), éditions du Seuil.
- Purnell, Sonia, A Woman of No Importance, Viking, 2019, Chapter Eight (pp. 169–195), entitled "Agent Most Wanted" is mostly about Alesch.
- Emmanuel Bégué (2021). L'archevêque de Cologne (in French). Medusis. ISBN 978-2951559332., historical novel about Robert Alesch, written in the first person.
