= Rue Spontini =

Street on the 16th arrondissement of Paris

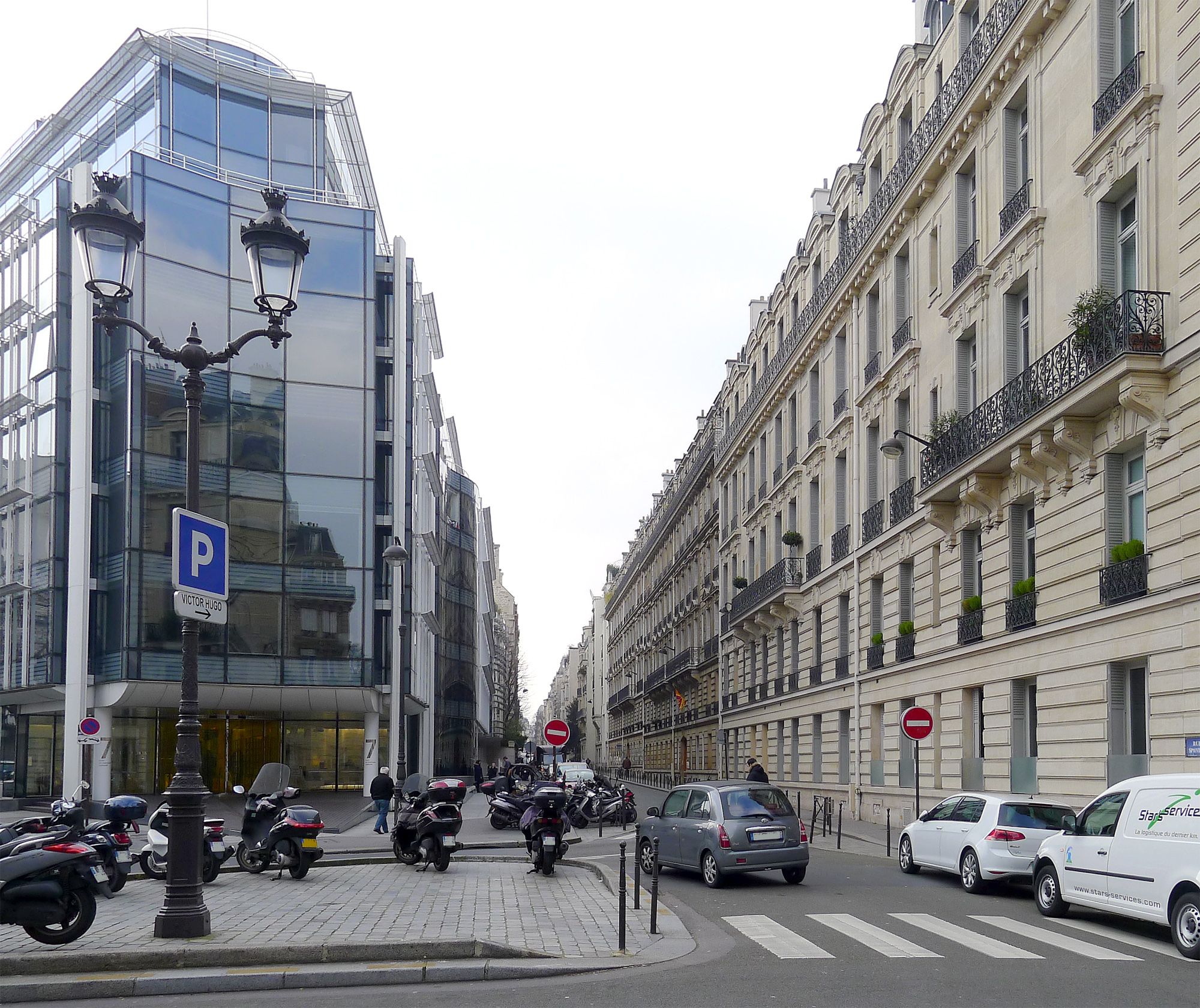
- Rue Spontini at the Place du Chancelier-Adenauer

- Location within Paris
- Former name: Rue du Petit-Parc
- Length: 665 m (2,182 ft)
- Width: 10 m
- Arrondissement: 16th
- Quarter: Porte Dauphine
- Coordinates: 48°52′08″N 2°16′40″E

Construction
- Completion: 1825
- Inauguration: 1865

The Rue Spontini is a street in the 16th arrondissement of Paris, France.

== Location and access ==
The Rue Spontini is a public way in the 16th arrondissement of Paris, part of the Porte-Dauphine district, an upscale residential neighborhood. It begins at 73, avenue Foch and ends at 2, rue Benjamin-Godard, level with the Avenue Victor-Hugo and the Place Mike-Brant.

The district is served by RER line C at the avenue Foch station and the avenue Henri-Martin station, as well as by the terminus of line 2 at the Porte Dauphine station and the extension of line 3b of the Île-de-France tramway.

== Name origin ==
The street is named after the Italian composer Gaspare Spontini (1774–1851).

== History ==
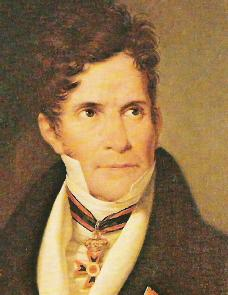
Gaspare Spontini

This street, which once formed part of the Rue du Petit-Parc, (Note: Rue du Petit-Parc, which was located in the former commune of Passy and Neuilly, has been replaced by rue Mignard, square Lamartine, rue Spontini and rue Pergolèse.) was created in 1825 when the road running east along the former La Muette pheasantry separated the communes of Passy and Neuilly.

The street is also the western boundary of the plaine de Passy housing estate created in 1825 by the Société des terrains de la plaine de Passy. The western part of this subdivision, which extended eastwards to the boulevard outside the Fermiers généraux enclosure, was not built until after 1850. Single-family homes were replaced by apartment blocks from the late 19th century onwards.

Classified as a Paris roadway by a decree of May 23, 1863, it took on its present name by a decree of October 2, 1865.

The section between the Rue de la Tour and the Avenue Henri-Martin became part of the Rue Mignard in 1881.

In 1881, the current Square Lamartine also included the part of the Rue Spontini between the Avenues Henri-Martin and Victor-Hugo.

== Remarkable buildings and places of memory ==
- Politician Michel Debré lived on this street.
- No. 2: on December 22, 1931, a party was held at this address to benefit the Petits Poulbots Christmas tree, presided over by the Marquise d'Andigné, the Marquise d'Armaillé, Princess Achille Murat and Countess Jean de Page. In front of the audience gathered in the hotel "graciously lent", several speakers followed one another: Doctor Gilbert Robin, the man of letters André de Fouquières and the writer André Maurois.
- No. 16: first site of the Bibliothèque d'art et d'archéologie, created by couturier Jacques Doucet in 1905 in the six adjoining apartments he owned in the building.
- No. 30bis: former private mansion built by architect Henri Grandpierre for painter Jean-Louis Forain (1852–1931), signed on the façade. Yves Saint Laurent's first couture collection was presented here on January 29, 1962. The couturier lived here with Pierre Bergé.
- No. 37: Villa Spontini, private street.
- No. 38: Saint-Albert-le-Grand chapel, German-speaking Catholic community in Paris.
- No. 43bis: Bourgat dance school.
- No. 45: Institut Supérieur de Gestion (ISG) building.
- No. 46: tenement building designed by architect Léon Bénouville between 1899 and 1901.
- No. 66: Cuban legation in the 1900s.
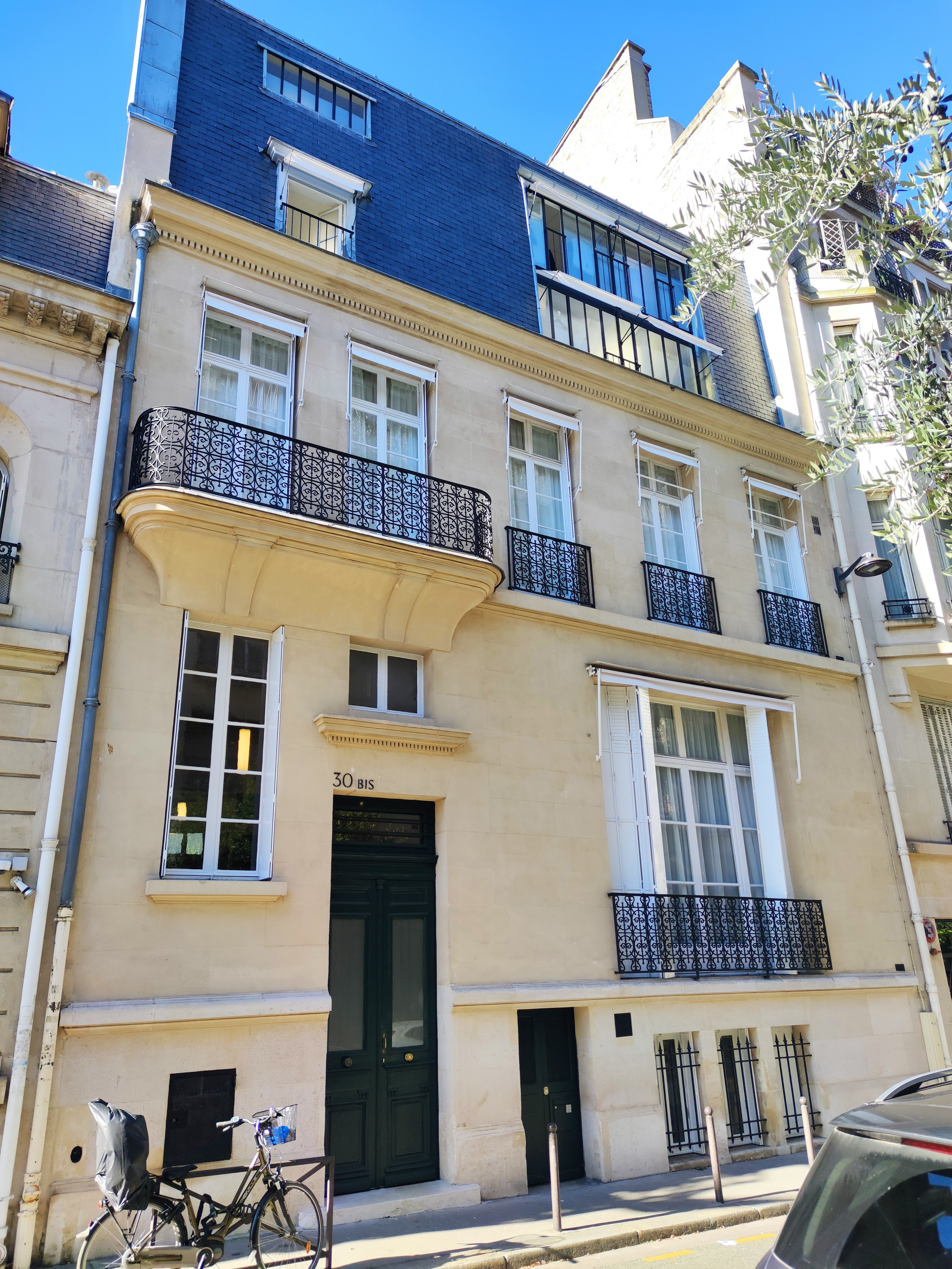
No. 30bis

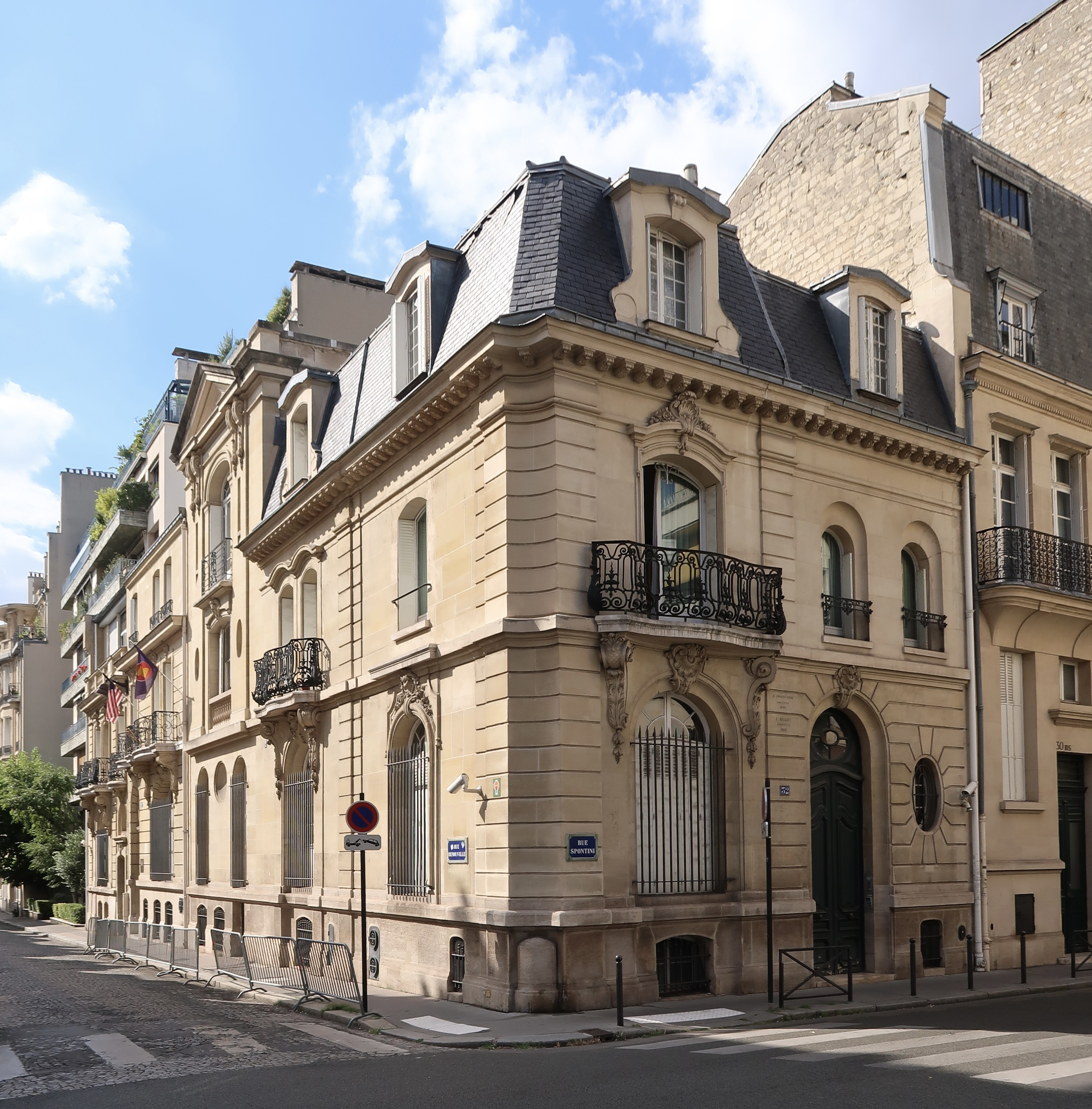
No. 32, at the junction with rue Benouville

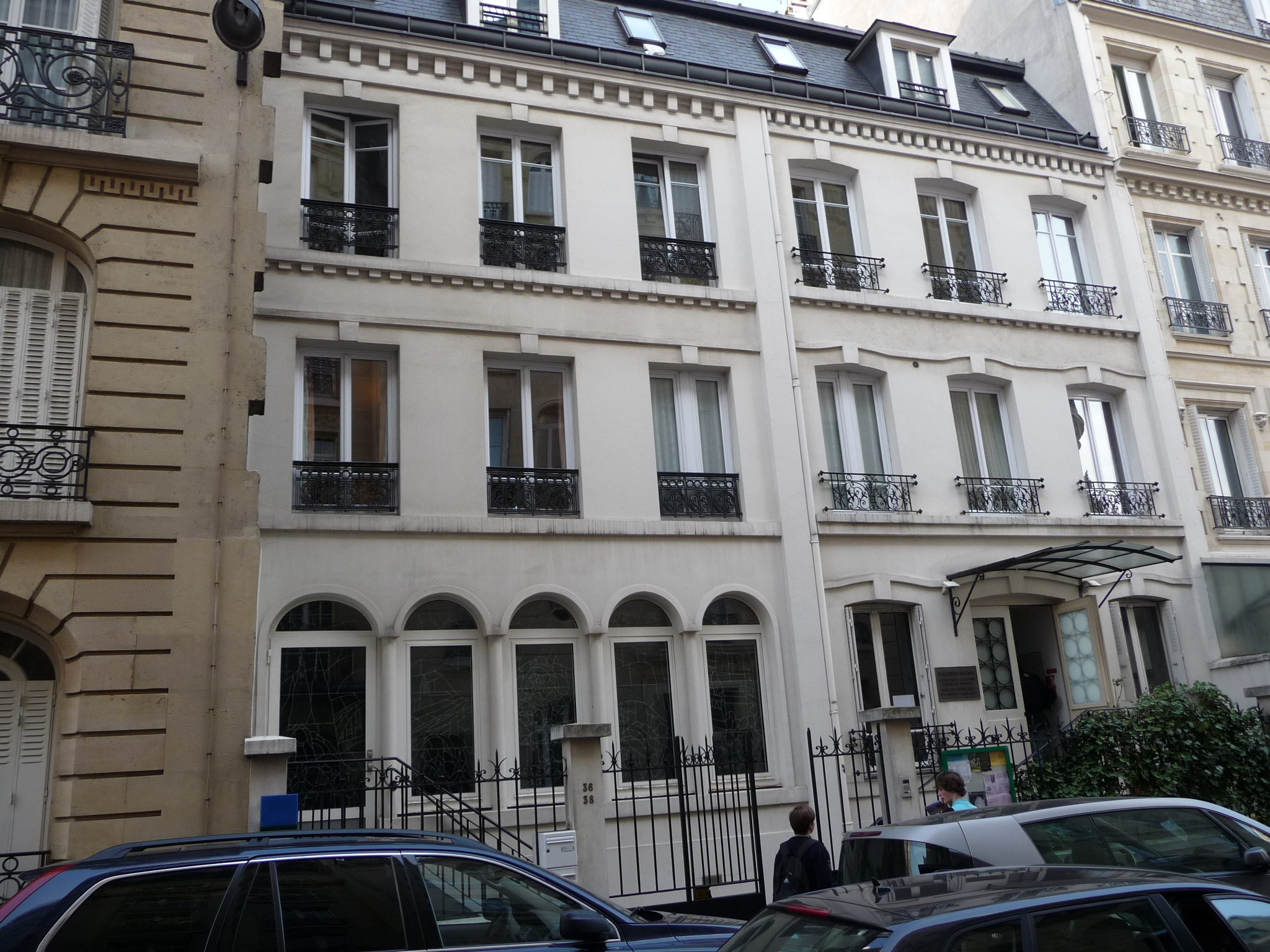
No. 38, Saint-Albert-le-Grand German church

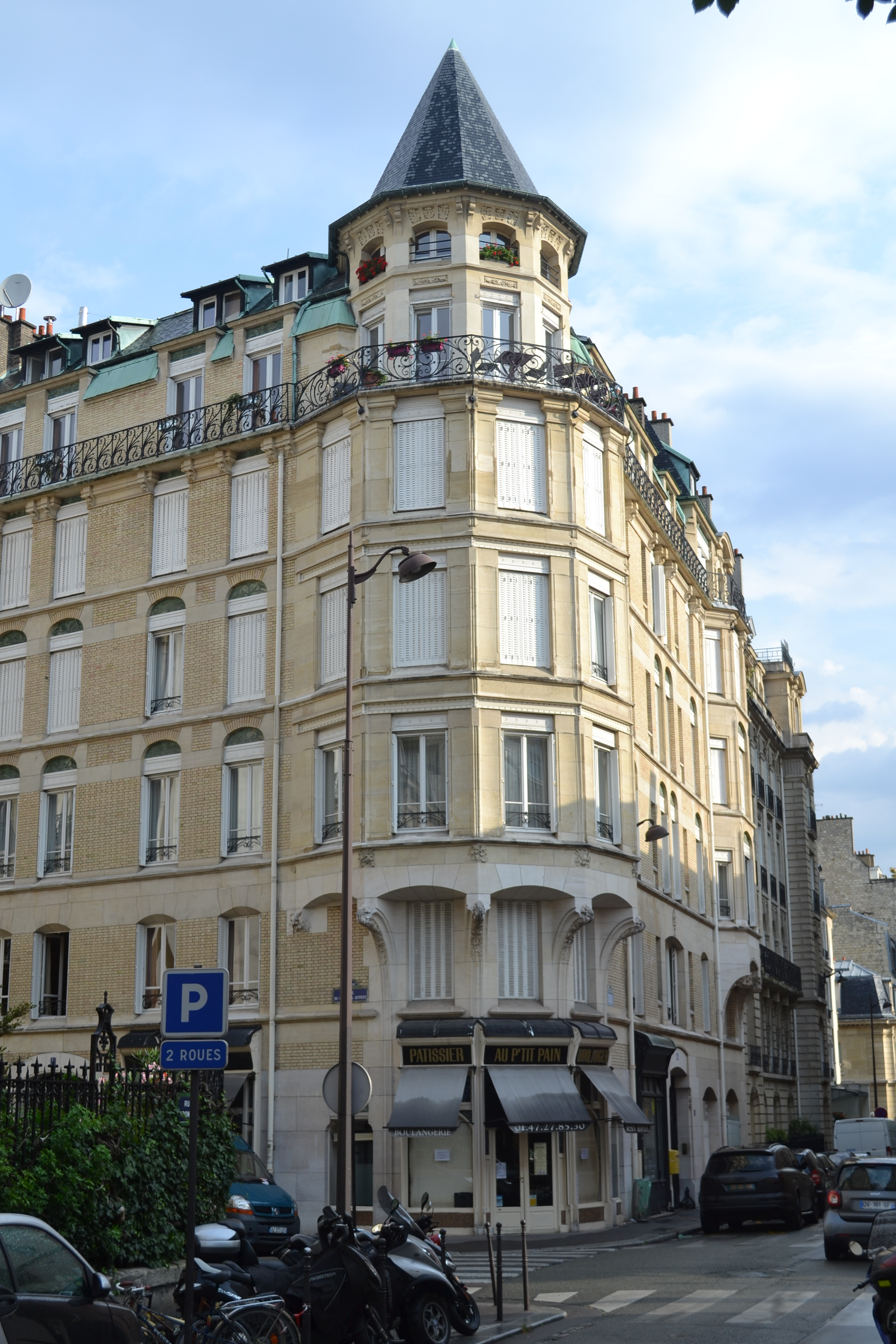
No. 46

=== Demolished building ===
- No. 19 (and rue de Noisiel): town house built by architect Louis Parent for couturier and collector Jacques Doucet (1853–1929).

== See also ==
- Gaspare Spontini
- List of streets in the 16th arrondissement of Paris
