= Nancy Polette =

American educator and writer

Nancy Polette is a writer, the author of more than 100 professional books and several children's books. She is a former teacher for grades K-8, director of several programs, and director of the Laboratory School at Lindenwood University. She has been an instructor for more than fifty years, including as a professor at Lindenwood University.

== Early life and education ==
Polette made her first publication in a children's magazine at the age of ten.

== Career ==
Nancy Polette worked as a K-8 classroom teacher for 30 years. She was a teacher in the school district of Pattonville when she also took the role as the school's librarian. She began writing books that teachers could use as resources and references.

Polette was later the director of the Laboratory School at Lindenwood University in St. Charles, Missouri. She also served as a director of Library/Media and Gifted Programs in St. Louis county schools.

In 2006, Polette's website, "Nancy Polette's Children's Literature Site", was given an "A" rating for its educational content by Education World magazine.

Polette has also been a keynote speaker and consultant at many conferences, including library and media specialists and gifted and reading educators.

In addition to speaking, Polette also advises school districts in the United States and Canada on meeting performance standards by using integrated learning in lessons.

Polette is a professor at Lindenwood University. She teaches educators how to efficiently use the libraries in their schools in order to engage students in lessons. Some of the workshops she has presented include: Mind Stretching Picture Books K-6, Luring Readers With Improvisation & Readers Theatre (Elementary/Middle School), Stretching Minds With Lemony Snicket, and many more.

Polette currently lives in O’Fallon, Missouri.

== Selected books ==
=== Children's books ===
- N is for Never Forget, 2017
- The Spy with the Wooden Leg: The Story of Virginia Hall, 2012
- Diagnosis: Monster, 2011
- Damsel or Daredevil?, 2006
- Grandma's Patchy Pocket, 2004
- Tangles, 1990
- The Little Old Women and the Hungry Cat, 1989

=== Professional books ===
- The Brain Power Story Hour, 2012
- Fairy Tale Fun, 2012
- Reading the Fifty States, 2010
- Lures to Literacy, 2003
- Books and Real Life, 1984
- E is for Everybody, 1982
- Three R’s for the Gifted, 1982
- Books to Build Brain Power, 1990
- Engage youngsters with Caldecott Fun
- Reading the World with Picture Books
- Mysteries in the Classroom
- Biography, By Golly!

=== Literature study and activity books ===
- ABCs of Thinking With Caldecott Books, Foster thinking skills!, Gr 1-3
- Another Point of View, (Fairy Tales), Gr 3-7
- Forecasting the Future with the Wizard of Oz, A whole new look at an old favorite with a focus on the future, Gr 2-6
- Historical Hoaxes, Gr 4-8
- Pfunny Phonics from Children's Literature, Gr K-2
- School Librarian's Grab Bag, Gr K-6
