= Avenue Victor-Hugo (Paris) =

Avenue in Paris, France

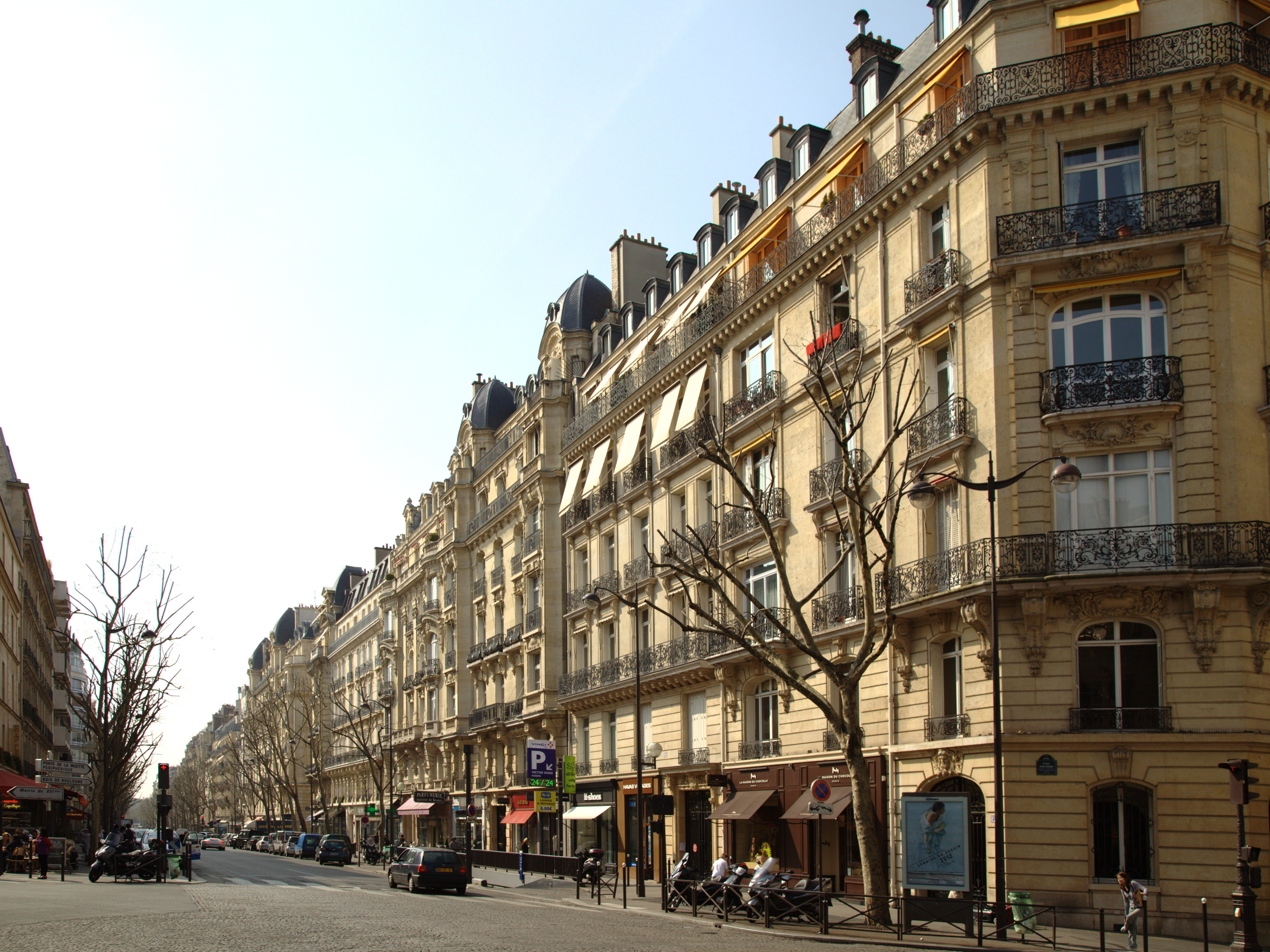
- Avenue Victor-Hugo at the level of the Rue de la Pompe

- Location within Paris
- Former names: Avenue Charles-X (1826); Avenue de Saint-Cloud (1830); Avenue d'Eylau (1864)
- Namesake: Victor Hugo
- Length: 1,765 km (1,097 mi)
- Width: 36m
- Arrondissement: 16th
- Quarter: Porte-Dauphine; Chaillot
- Coordinates: 48°52′08″N 2°17′00″E
- North end: Place Charles de Gaulle
- South end: Avenue Henri-Martin

Construction
- Completion: 1826

The Avenue Victor-Hugo (French pronunciation: [avny viktɔʁ yɡo]) is an avenue in the 16th arrondissement of Paris. It begins at the Place Charles de Gaulle (also known as the Place de l'Étoile) and ends at the Place Tattegrain (becoming the Avenue Henri-Martin). It is one of the twelve avenues beginning at the Étoile, and the second longest of the twelve, after the Avenue des Champs-Élysées.

== Description ==
The avenue junction with the Étoile in between those of the Avenue Foch and the Avenue Kléber. It runs along the Chaillot Hill. Halfway along it is the Place Victor-Hugo and the Line 2 Metro station Victor Hugo. Originally named the Avenue de Saint-Cloud, the avenue was renamed after Hugo on 28 February 1881 (the day after his 79th birthday).

Crossing the whole northern part of the 16th arrondissement, over 1.825 km from the Étoile to the Muette, it is an average of 36 m wide (its first part, between the Étoile and the Place Victor-Hugo, is wider than the second part, between the Place Victor Hugo and the Place Tattegrain). Planted with trees and decorated with a statue of its namesake at the junction with the Avenue Henri-Martin, it is one of the most prestigious avenues in Paris.

== Notable buildings ==
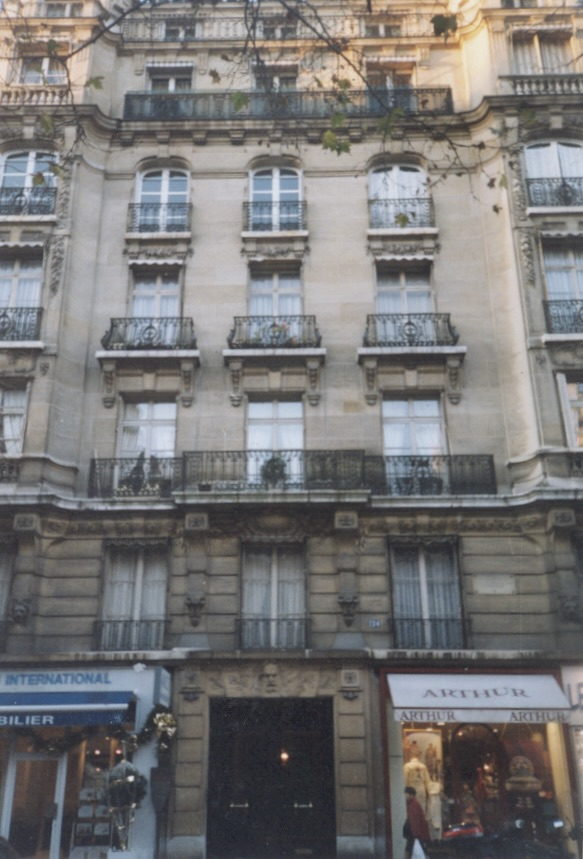
At number 124, Humbert's building on the site of Hugo's hôtel particulier

The avenue includes several buildings by Pierre Humbert, such as numbers 122 and 167 (the latter built in 1911 for Humbert's family). Humbert also built number 124, on the site of the hôtel particulier where Victor Hugo spent his last days (having as his address "Mr Victor Hugo, In his avenue, in Paris"). The 1907 building's magnificent façade won several prizes and includes a sculpture of Hugo's face by Fonquergne. The Haitian president Lysius Salomon died at number 3 on 19 October 1888.

== See also ==
- 16th arrondissement of Paris
