= Réseau Gloria =

French resistance movement

The réseau Gloria SMH (Gloria network) was a French Resistance network under the German occupation of France during World War II.

The Gloria network was founded by Gabrielle Picabia, alias "Gloria", who was running it with Jacques Legrand (chemical engineer). It counted among its members Alfred Péron, normalien and English professor at the Lycée Buffon. The network depended on the British Secret Intelligence Service, in conjunction with the SOE. The network's mission was to gather military and naval information about the occupiers. Its members were intellectuals, managers, and artists including an engraver who was very useful for producing false documents.

The Gloria network was infiltrated by Father Robert Alesch and was decimated in August 1942. Most of the operatives, including Péron, were arrested by the Nazis. Samuel Beckett and his companion Suzanne Dechevaux-Dumesnil, were warned by Péron's wife and escaped arrest, fleeing to their friend the writer Nathalie Sarraute in the free zone. In total, more than 80 members of the network were deported and many never returned from Mauthausen or Buchenwald. The head of the network, Jacques Legrand, died in Mauthausen, and Péron died in Switzerland two days after his return from Mauthausen.

== Sources ==
- Bureau Résistance and family archives (in French)
- Knowlson, James (1996). Damned to fame: the life of Samuel Beckett. Simon & Schuster. ISBN 0684808722.
- Davies, William (2020). Samuel Beckett and the Second World War. London: Bloomsbury.
