= Avenue Henri-Martin =

Avenue in Paris, France

Coordinates: 48°51′51″N 2°16′22″E

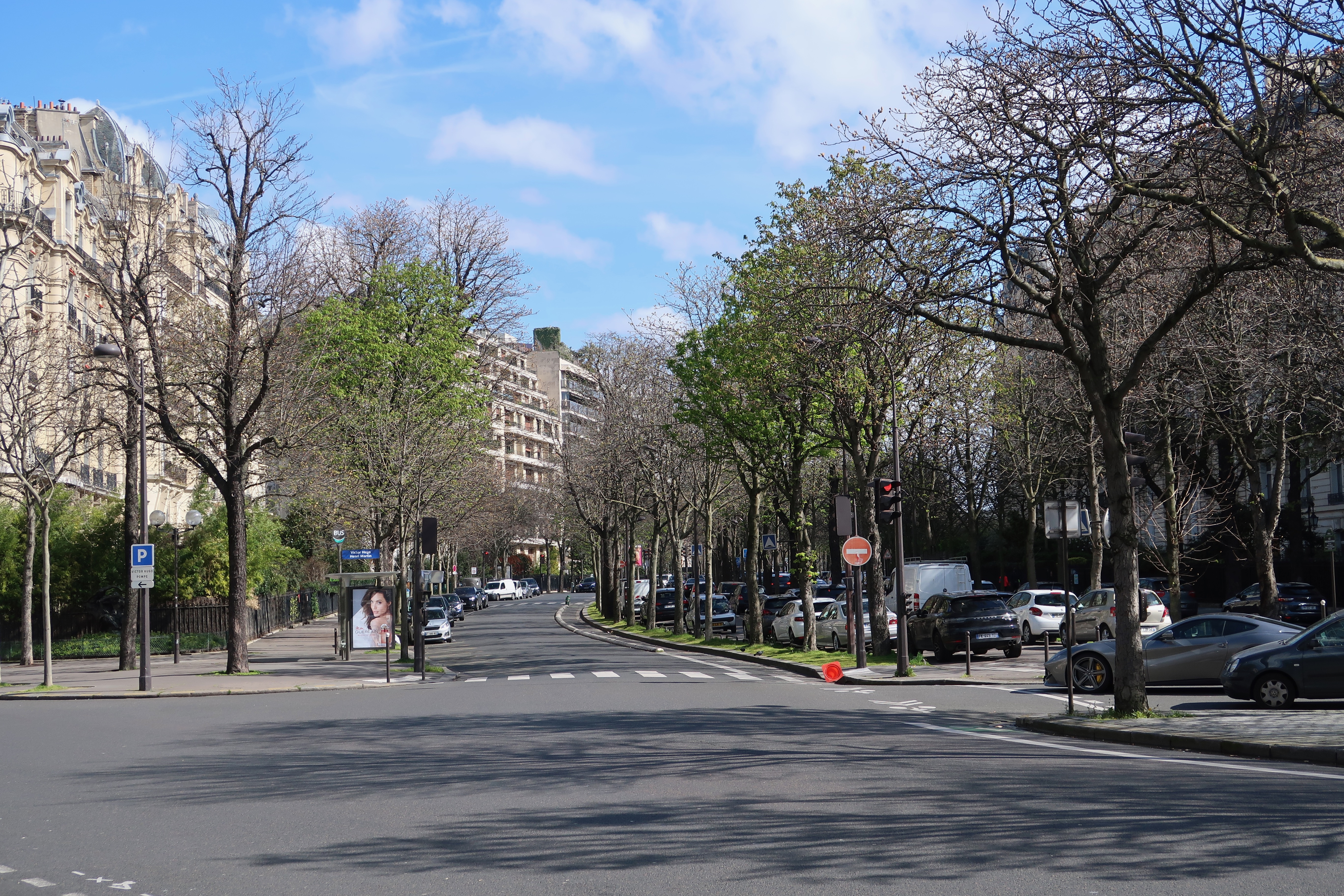
Avenue Henri-Martin

The Avenue Henri-Martin (French pronunciation: [avny ɑ̃ʁi maʁtɛ̃]) is an avenue in the 16th arrondissement of Paris, named after the French historian Henri Martin (1810–1883), onetime mayor of the 16th arrondissement.

The Avenue Henri-Martin in the 16th arrondissement of Paris is 663 metres long and 40 metres wide. It starts at the Rue de la Pompe and ends at the Place de Colombie, where the Boulevard Suchet changes into the Boulevard Lannes. Both streets lead to the outskirts of the urban forest Bois de Boulogne. It also passes through two "Quartiers" (districts): Muette, which lies in the eastern part, and Porte Dauphine in the western part. At the eastern end of the street there is a metro station (Rue de la Pompe), which is a stop on line nine. At the western end the station Gare de l'avenue Henri Martin, which is connected with the RER lines, is operated on the lines C1 and C3.

== History ==
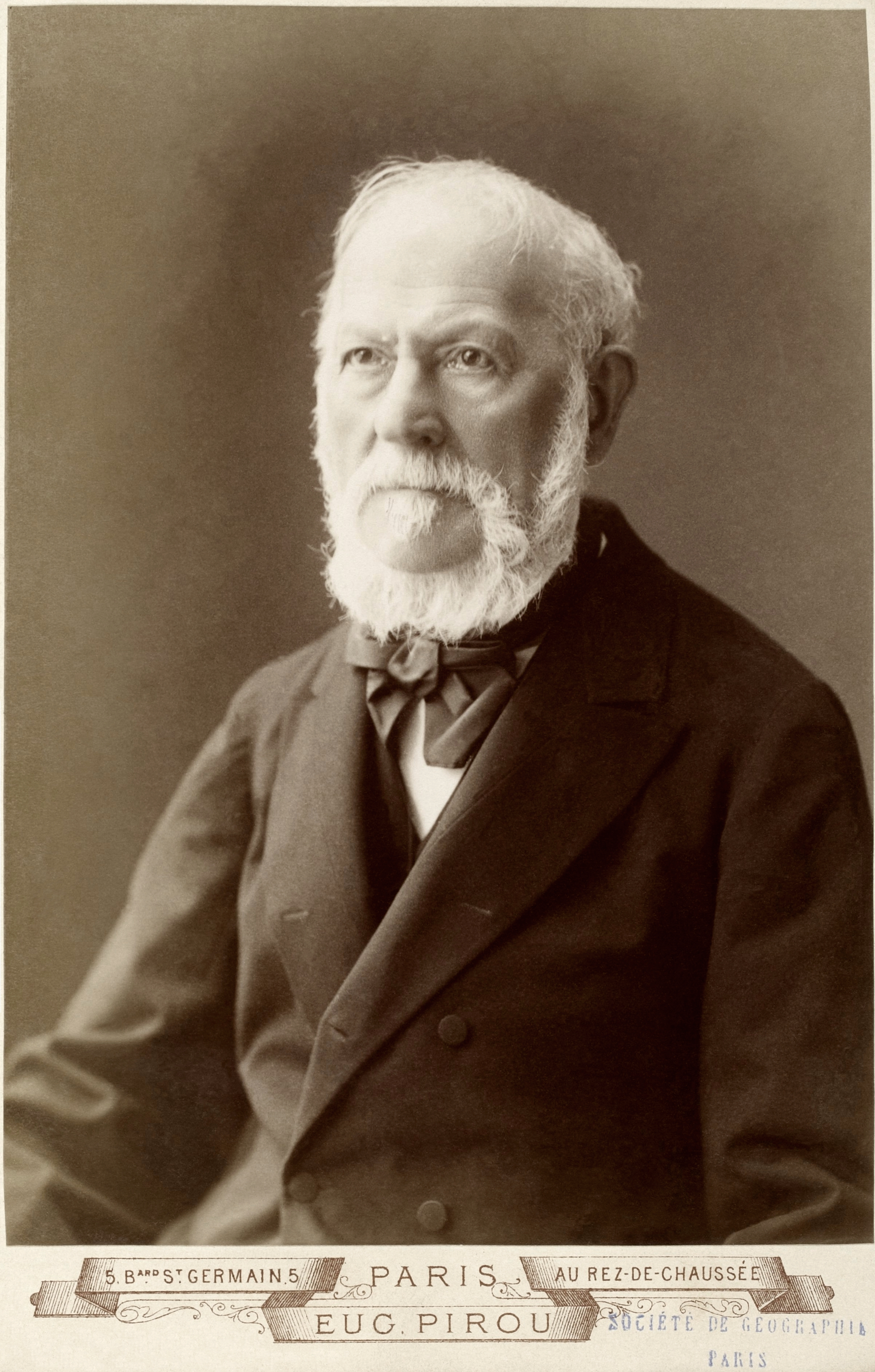
Henri Martin

The Avenue Henri-Martin was one of several avenues built with the re-development of Chaillot Quartier, one of the Paris districts defined by the third administrative and redevelopment system devised by Baron Haussmann. The new plan for this old part of western Paris was organized around the Chaillot Hill as the main geographical feature, with the Place du Trocadéro as the terminal point of the new avenues. The Avenue Henri-Martin ran west from the Place du Trocadéro.

The Avenue Henri-Martin continues in the western part of the Rue de la Pompe as the Avenue Georges-Mandel; this section also belonged to the Avenue Henri-Martin earlier, but was changed in 1945 in honour of the French historian and politician Louis Georges Rothschild alias Georges Mandel (1885–1944), who was murdered in World War II. The house numbers show that all of this was a single street at an earlier point in time. The Avenue Georges-Mandel ends with the numbers 58 or rather 69, whereas the local street starts with the numbers 58 or rather 71. In the building at number 71, the administrative headquarters of the 16th arrondissement can be found.

The Avenue Henri-Martin was named after Henri Martin, a French historian and politician (1810-1883), who was elected mayor of the 16th arrondissement in 1870. He wrote a book with the title Histoire de France, which consisted of 17 volumes.

== Well-known residents ==
The building with the house numbers 107 through 113 was once the home of the French poet Alphonse de Lamartine. Geo-engineer Paul Louis Weiss, born in Strasbourg in 1867, also lived there in a spacious flat from the time of his arrival in Paris in 1899 until his death on Christmas in 1945. Moreover, the main entrance to Winnaretta Singer's house, built in 1904, can be found in this street, too. She was one of the daughters and heiresses of Isaac Merritt Singer, who made his fortune in the sewing machine branch. Grand Duke Cyril of Russia and his wife Grand Duchess Victoria had an apartment at no. 32 (now Avenue Georges Mandel) from 1906 until the 1920s.

== Bibliography ==
Carmona, Michel (2002). Haussmann: His Life and Times, and the Making of Modern Paris. Translated by Patrick Camiller. Chicago: Ivan R. Dee. ISBN 1-56663-427-X.
