= Armed peace in the provinces =

1563–7 French peace in the provinces

The years 1563–1567 would see the French crown, led by the queen mother Catherine de' Medici, and her son Charles IX attempt to implement the edict of Amboise which had brought the first French War of Religion to a close in April 1563. To this end, commissioners were sent out into the provinces, and the royal court would undertake a tour of the kingdom from 1564 to 1566.

The tranquillity of the provinces, and the toleration afforded to Protestantism and Catholicism, varied wildly across the kingdom. In the lands of the queen of Navarre in southern France, Protestantism was favoured to the point of exclusivity after 1566. Meanwhile, in cities such as Dijon in Burgundy, while technically legal, Protestants were subject to harassment and legal discrimination, the ambiguity of the edict of Amboise's terms being used against them.

Though at peace, the years would not be free of religious violence. In Paris, Protestants were murdered in the street. Meanwhile, in June 1566 in Pamiers, Catholics were massacred. The French crown attempted to suppress these disorders, entrusting its provincial agents with suppressing disturbances, and looking to curtail authorities (such as the Paris militia) little inclined to respect toleration of Protestantism.

== Commissioners ==
With the aim of sidelining the parlements, king Charles IX established a national system of commissioners, issuing letters of commission from 18 June 1563 to this effect. The commissioners would enforce the peace edict of Amboise in places where it was not yet implemented and impose justice on those who defied the piece. They would be supported in their work by the local administrative apparatus, and their commissions would be registered by the relevant regional parlement (highest court of ancien régime France, there were eight in the kingdom during this period: Paris, Rouen, Dijon, Grenoble, Aix, Toulouse, Bordeaux, and Rennes). The commissioners were dispatched in pairs to each province of the kingdom with the exception of the province of Champagne which was exempted from receiving them. There were a total of twenty-eight commissions issued, though only thirteen commissioners would actually take up their charges in the provinces (some of them covering multiple territories).

The assigned commissioners were as follows. For the province of the Île de France, Mathieu Chartier and Pierre de Longueil; for Normandy, Jacques Viole and Jehan de La Guesle; for Picardy, Charles de Lamoignon and François le Cercier; for Burgundy, Estienne Charlet and Jehan de Montceaux; for the Lyonnais, Michel Queslain and Gabriel Myron; for Dauphiné and Provence, Jacques Phelippeaux and Jessé de Bauquemare; for Languedoc, Jean-Jacques de Mesmes and Jacques de Bauquemare; for Guyenne, Antoine Fumée and Jérôme Angenoust/Jacques Viart; for Poitou and Saintonge, René de Bourgneuf and Pierre de Masparraulte; for Brittany, Etienne Lallement and Charles de Chantecler; for Touraine, Maine and Anjou, François Briçonnet and Arnoul Boucher/Jean de Lavau; and for the Orléanais, Jehan-Baptiste de Machault.

Working alongside the commissioners in this national peace effort were the three maréchaux (Marshal - second most senior military office in the kingdom of France). Covering Paris, and the provinces of the Île de France, Picardy, Normandy, Champagne, the Orléanais, and Berry would be the maréchal de Montmorency. For the provinces of Touraine, Anjou, Maine, Poitou, parts of Brittany and lower-Normandy would be the maréchal de Bourdillon. For the Lyonnais, Dauphiné, Provence (including the territorial exclaves around the Comtat Venaissin) and Languedoc would be the maréchal de Vielleville. Vielleville would receive praise for his even-handedness and would subsequently be granted responsibility over Poitou and the pays Messin.

== Île de France ==
In the hopes of enforcing the peace, Charles leant on the four maréchaux of France. They were to conduct tours of inspection to assess how the edict of Amboise was being applied. The maréchal de Montmorency, the governor of the Île de France was tasked with touring the towns of his government by order of 6 May 1563.

=== Sites of worship ===
For the bailliage of Senlis, the city of Pontoise was selected for Protestant worship. Charles alerted the maréchal de Montmorency to this on 20 April, before the main list of proposed sites had been published. It had been chosen over the objection of its inhabitants, and the cardinal de Bourbon, and therefore Charles left it to Montmorency as to whether he maintained it or moved it.

Discretion over all sights of Protestant worship in the Île de France would be devolved to the maréchal de Montmorency the following month.

With Protestant worship banned in Paris and the wider prévôté by the terms of the edict of Amboise, Catherine also sought to eliminate Protestant worship from the more prominent towns around Paris. In the bailliage of Senlis, Catherine looked to see the maréchal de Montmorency move the site of Protestant worship from Pontoise to a 'small city' in the area by a letter of 20 April. Nemours and Melun were declared to be unsuitable venues for Protestant worship, and Fontainebleau, where the Protestant duchess of Ferrara looked to establish Protestant preaching, was outlawed on grounds it was too close to the French court. Catherine suggested the place of Pont-Sainte-Maxence to Montmorency, advising him against Beauvais and Compiègne.

Melun, Corbeil, and Meulan would all be granted exemptions from Protestant worship. The Catholics of Meulan had argued in a petition of November 1563, that the edict was intended for areas in which there was religious diversity, but that there was not a single Protestant among their number. The Protestants of Melun meanwhile, attempted to assert the original designation of a suburb of their city as the site of Protestant worship after had been changed to a place two leagues away.

=== Paris ===
The maréchal de Montmorency, governor of Paris, was held in suspicion by Catholics in Paris, for he had introduced his cavalry into the capital and installed cannons in the Bastille. In the opinion of the Spanish ambassador to France, Álava, Montmorency, along with the prince de Condé and the admiral de Coligny were planning to seize the capital. The historian Diefendorf moderates this view, arguing that the Catholics of Paris held Montmorency in suspicion as being overly sympathetic to Protestants, but nevertheless respected his authority.

==== Coming of peace ====
The capital represented a Catholic stronghold. Protestants, and those suspected of being Protestants were attacked and killed, and during the war the city had largely been emptied of its Protestant population. The coming of peace had been greeted with disgust, the heralds who proclaimed it on 30 March being targeted with thrown mud, or even hunted down. The prévôt des marchands (provost of the merchants, de facto mayor of Paris before the establishment of the title) reprimanded the Paris militia for failing to maintain order on 7 April. This rebuke was followed with a stronger one delivered by king Charles and queen mother Catherine on Easter Sunday, 11 April. They alluded to the murder of several prisoners who had been seized from the guards. The city was urged to put an end to such activities. In response to this rebuke, the city officials pinned the blame for the murder of the prisoners on their guards, who had mentioned that they were rebel Protestants. No effort would be made to track down the responsible, though going forward more precautions were taken with prisoner transfers.

The radical preacher Simon Vigor denounced the edict and expounded on the right to disobey an impious sovereign.

The bureau de la ville attempted to stop Protestants from returning to their homes or working. In this they could look to the parlement which had on 12 April declared that Parisian Protestants should delay their return until after the situation had calmed, Easter had passed, and the mercenaries had departed the kingdom. Those Protestants who attempted to return were subject to attacks, and had to make their coming home under cover of darkness.

==== Government by Amboise's terms ====
By the terms of the edict of Amboise, Protestants in the capital were not to travel to neighbouring bailliages to attend worship and then return to Paris. If they wished to practice their faith, they were to emigrate from the capital permanently. For the burial of their dead, they had to conduct internments at night, and without any sort of gathering. The parlement of Paris ensured the rigorous following of these stringent prohibitions.

In the summer of 1563, the Corpus Christi celebrations were tarnished by violence. An unknown Protestant was killed in the event. A gentleman of the prince de Condé's suite named Couppé, who was accompanying the carriage of the princes wife Éléonore de Roye on route to Vincennes was also killed near one of the capital's gates by a group numbering perhaps three-hundred men. The couple were playing host to Charles and Catherine at this time.

==== Prévôt des marchands against the guard and militia ====
The next day, Charles ordered the prévôt des marchands to arrest those responsible. That afternoon, two militia captains were arrested and charged with involvement in the deed. This was unacceptable to the other militia captains, who rushed to support their compatriots. They threatened that the people would riot if their colleagues were not released. The prévôt relented and freed the captains. He then went through the city and explained measurers to be undertaken which amounted to a curfew.

In late June, a Protestant who had been executed for robbery had his body torn down, where it was beaten with sticks before being dragged into the Seine. The prévôt des marchands and alderman rushed out to confront the crowd. They ordered that they hand over the body, and several members of the crowd were arrested. Those adults arrested were sentenced to be hanged, but on route to their hanging, they were freed by the crowd, who tossed stones at the guards. In the following inquest, militiamen and guards deemed responsible for the lapse in security were fined.

On 2 July, a special guard was created to protect the prêvôt des marchands and aldermen during their rounds in the city. This proved no help for two aldermen conducting inspections of the guard at the porte Saint-Antoine on 9 July, who were set upon by a crowd who chanted 'kill the Huguenots'. Militia officers eventually intervened to rescue the aldermen. Three militia men were charged with instigating this riot, with witnesses reporting that the aldermen were trying to protect the Protestants. The guilty militia men were on duty at the time.

Orders came down from the crown that those guarding the gates of Paris cease to daily parade out of their posts to drumbeats and flying standards on 19 July. This was defied by some captains. The ensign at the porte Saint-Jacques marched his men through the city in a procession spearheaded by two bagpipers. The prévôt des marchands attempted to reason with the captains when they came as a collective to the hôtel de ville to protest the order. One captain was suspended after he stated that he would not march without drums and standards. Threats were made that any who defied this order would have their names reported to the king, but this accomplished little.

On 11 August, Charles gave new warning to Paris about their defiance of his orders concerning their parades. He threatened to march on the city at the head of an army and enforce its submission. In response to these threats, new efforts were made to bring the militia into line. Inspections were conducted, and captains called up to explain their defiance. Some captains complained that they could not comply because their men were defiant and resisted their efforts to stop them flying the flag. One captain reported that his men had told him they would abandon their posts rather than yield.

==== Disarming the militia ====
During the first French War of Religion, the bourgeois militia of Paris had been armed. With the coming of peace, it took a long time for them to relent on possession of their weapons. The hatred the militiamen enjoyed for the Protestants motivated their desire to remain under arms. The hôtel de ville (city hall) found itself in dispute with the militia, which repeatedly refused royal orders to disarm.

The Paris militia had been left intact after the civil war, in the hopes that it would aid in the enforcement of the peace. By August, it was apparent that the militia was more of a danger than a boon to the peace. As part of the declaration of royal majority of 17 August 1563, Charles issued a letter to the Parisian authorities outlining the dismantling of the civic guard. Responsibility for the night watch would return to the chevalier du guet, whose numbers would be supplemented at the expense of the city. He outlined again his threat to bring the army into Paris.

Over the coming months, the city attempted to negotiate with Charles. They succeeded in avoiding his threatened occupation of Paris, and getting the new professional guard reduced in scope by two-thirds. The citizens watch would also be permitted to survive, but on a far reduced scale. Regardless, it would not be until late October that all the weapons from the dissolved militia were collected in. These episodes, which pitted the hôtel de ville against the more radical elements of the population acted as a divisive wedge.

On 3 January 1564, the heads of households in Paris were granted the right to retain their arms, this was due to the proliferation of private killings at this time. This unnerved the Protestants.

Despite this, Charles still hoped to see the city disarmed. He summoned the notables of the city to him, so that he might praise their obedience. The king also cautioned them against perpetrating any excesses in violation of the edict of Amboise. He therefore hoped to curtail their possession of arquebuses and pistols. As such, he proposed a buy back scheme in which he would purchase pistols from the Parisians.

==== Protestant church ====
In compliance with the edict of Amboise, the Protestant church of the capital was dissolved. This was done by a meeting of the Paris consistory at Orléans of 26 March 1563 over the objections of the pastor Chandieu and other Protestant ministers.

However, this was only done for six months, before the Protestant church was secretly re-established.

The covertly reformed church was at first conducted in small clandestine groups, but with time the Protestants grew bolder. In December 1565, an illegal synod was held in the capital. Less well-known ministers were chosen to work covertly in the capital, while more famous figures were dispatched outside the city, where they might receive people to provide the sacrament in places of greater safety. The Parisian Protestant ministers lived in fear of betrayal, something which offered the prospect of Catholic reprisals, and the instigation of civil war on terms unfavourable to the Protestants.

Champion alleges that Protestant sermons were held at twenty places in the capital in contravention of the edict of Amboise which forbade Protestantism in the capital. Further he states that Protestant magistrates had secured public office. The Spanish ambassador, Álava, would despair in April 1566 that Paris was a Protestant city.

The cardinal de Châtillon was accused, in May 1565, of hosting Protestant services in the capital in defiance of the peace edict. The prince de Condé gave assurance that he had not consented to his coreligionist's act.

Towards the end of March 1567, Catherine entreated the maréchal de Montmorency to try and convey to the Protestants of the capital that if they continued to violate the edict of Amboise, there was much trouble to be feared. This intervention had little effect, the Protestants determining galvanising the more they felt persecuted.

The next month, the pastor Chandieu, who had until this point camped out in Lyon, afraid of showing himself in the capital, resolved to resume his ministry in Paris.

==== Violence and scandal ====
In November 1563, Charles afforded to Paris a court of consular justices for the regulation of commerce. This institution was already enjoyed by Lyon, Rouen, and Toulouse. The affording of this privilege to Paris would be affirmed again in April 1565.

In early December, Condé's chaplain was assaulted in the capital by members of the congregation of Saint Germain l'Auxerrois. The man was only saved thanks to the intervention of Protestant soldiers.

On 22 December, at the church of Saint-Séverin, a scandal erupted. During the raising of the host (i.e. the bread) as part of the Mass, a man wrestled the priest to the ground host in hand. The man was seized and representatives sent off to the Louvre (then a royal residence) to complain. Put on trial, the man's hands would be cut off in front of Saint-Geneviève. This done, he was to be burned alive at the place Maubert. Having declared that he intended to die a Catholic, the condemned man was allowed to be strangled before he was burned.

On 30 December, the royal family conducted reparation for the crime, participating in a procession from Sainte-Chapelle to Saint-Séverin. The Venetian ambassador reported that the Lorraine-Guise family played a prominent role in this religious pageantry. Along the route, torches were lit, and houses covered with hangings.

In April 1564, the maréchal de Montmorency's men clashed with a Catholic crowd which was attempting to disinter a Protestant corpse from the Cemetery of the Innocents in line with the regulations on Protestant burials outlined by the king in December 1563.

==== Harvest troubles ====
Though there were religious issues in the capital, the main trouble of the interwar period was an economic one in Knecht's estimation.

As concerned Paris, though prices for grain had come down with the coming of peace, in 1564 the crops were annihilated by rain before they could be brought in from the fields. This was followed by a bitter winter so cold that wine in cellars froze and peasants could be found dead in their fields. When the frozen river finally thawed, it was as a torrent, making it impossible for the river Seine to be navigated. A cold spring meant the 1565 harvest was poor and by June, Charles had to give order that prohibited the exporting of grain from Paris. The city was forced to import grain from places as far away as Sweden and Danzig. Torrential rains again wiped out the crop in 1566, causing grain prices to peak. For example, a setier of wheat, which in 1565 sold for nine or ten livres in the capital, peaked at a price of twenty-one livres and 10 sols in July 1566 (five times the average price for pre-1561 figures).

In such a crisis, the grandees of the city feared that the poor would attempt to loot the houses of the rich looking for supplies of grain, and that riots could follow. The 1565 plans to import grain from Danzig were frustrated by an early freeze in the north.

The impoverished flocked into the capital, leading to a tightening of the capital's laws relating to the poor. The parlement of Paris forbade speculation and the hoarding of surpluses. Alms were levied on the bourgeois. With the situation at its most acute in 1566, the need to protect the bakers, who would be blamed for the prices, was realised. Armed guards were stationed in the markets in some quarters of the city. Homes, barns and convents were searched to find hidden grain stores, and requisitioning undertaken from the countryside. By August, sufficient grain had been acquired to allow for the prices to decline, but they remained at double their prewar average.

==== Religious temperature rising ====
Twice in September 1566, Protestants returning to Paris from their services outside the city were greeted with crowds of abusive Catholics, some bearing swords.

The response to the queen of Navarre's public Protestant preaching in the city in November 1566 was even more bitter, with placards posted around the city calling people to violence, they were to kill them all. This outcry prompted a new effort to root out those Protestant pastors living secretly in Paris. One such preacher wrote to the Calvinist leader Theodore de Beza in January 1567 that Vigor (a Catholic priest) was doing all he could to set the king against them, but that neither he nor his colleagues had stopped their work. He feared that unless god showed mercy, a new period of troubles would soon be upon them.

In January 1567, the duc de Guise made his entry to Paris, where he was received with considerable affection.

On 6 April, a week after Easter, a Protestant rushed the priest at the moment the host was to be consecrated and tore the bread to pieces. This was the cause of great scandal.

A month later, on 6 May, the order was given that Protestant services in Paris would be forbidden. Nevertheless, a Protestant service would be held a little while later, at which several hundred would attend. Catching wind of this, local Catholics attempted to storm the building. They were held off by the Protestants inside until the Parisian authorities arrived and forced the door. They found the building largely empty, most of the congregation having fled. The six Protestants still in the building were taken to prison, though they had to be escorted to stop their stoning by the Catholics.

Come June 1567, Charles was receiving regular complaints about illegal Protestant assemblies, preaching, baptisms, marriages and fundraising in Paris. By letters patent of 1 June, he reiterated the prohibition on the exercise of the Protestant religion in Paris and its suburbs. Rather than being defined solely by the bounds of the vicomté and prévôté of Paris, a more specific distance prohibition was added to the law. Those who continued to defy the law would be subject to severe penalties. The historian Thompson argues the law was not designed as a reactionary measure, but rather a method of avoiding conflict, observing that the liberal chancellor L'Hôpital supported its implementation.

The radical Catholic priest, Simon Vigor, claimed that a certain Hugues Sureau du Rosier, who had been arrested in June before being released on grounds of lack of evidence, had produced a book in which he called for the assassination of king Charles.

Corpus Christi celebrations in 1567 would again play host to riots. Charles saw necessity in armed support for the Parisian officials attempting to keep order in the capital. Thus, in mid-July, the prévôt des marchands and aldermen of Paris were invited to establish new peace keeping forces for each quarter of the capital, totalling one-hundred men apiece. These men would typically be heads of households but would not be armed with firearms. They would serve under bourgeois notables selected by Charles from lists provided by the city. Those who had previously served as militia officers in the past iteration of the organisation, would not be permitted to do so in this one. Despite this provision, six of the seventeenth captains named would be former captains, and he therefore ordered their replacement. This new militia, which champion puts at 1,600 men was to stand ready for any alert. Diefendorf states that while this force could in theory have been used for suppression of both Protestant or Catholic excesses, it was seen as an anti-Protestant force.

In August, Simon Vigor claimed that around fifty to sixty Protestant ministers, in addition to 'unknown persons', had gathered in the capital to plan a coup against the king.

By September, Protestant fear in the capital was such that some Parisian Protestants started to sell their property and depart from the capital.

A panic rippled through Paris in early September. The guard was reinforced, four of the gates sealed up, and foreigners expelled from the capital. This represented a blow to the capital's merchant community. Spooked, Charles, who was in Picardy, moved to see what was happening in the capital, but it turned out to be a false alarm.

At the place of La Ferté-Milon, Catherine ordered the maréchal de Montmorency to impose order. Both religions were to be put in a state of concord in the town such that the edict would be maintained. Having been petitioned about the location for Protestant worship, Catherine responded that the court would handle the matter upon its return to Paris.

=== Other places ===
At Dreux in June 1563, the parlement of Paris found cause to open an investigation into the Protestants of the place who were 'seditious' and 'disturbers of the peace'.

The suppression of the bailliage of Chaumont-en-Vexin and its reintegration into the bailliage of Senlis negated the site of Protestant worship granted to the former bailliage by the edict of Amboise.

== Normandy ==
The historian Crété characterises the position of Protestantism in Normandy favourably during the peace, thanks to the efforts of the province's governor, the duc de Bouillon.

The maréchal de Brissac was given the responsibilities of a lieutenant-general in Normandy for the purpose of pacifying the province.

The Protestant nobility of Normandy was felt to be particularly restless. Charles wrote to the seigneur de Matignon in May 1566, noting that nobles were departing from the province towards unknown ends. Matignon was to investigate this matter to identify who was leaving from Normandy, and the purpose of their departure. He also noted that he had ordered those that were in Paris to withdraw back to their homes, and that Matignon was to appraise him of when they returned.

On 28 March 1567, Charles wrote to the seigneur de Matignon, the lieutenant-general of Normandy, concerning his superior the governor. The king disapproved of the way the duc de Bouillon had distributed the 12,000 livres granted to him for the purpose of ensuring his province was prepared against both internal and external threat. Bouillon had spread the money around all the places of Normandy. Charles advised that with such a methodology, the already small sum would be split such that it would be useless. Rather, Bouillon should identify the place of greatest need and pursue it until it was in a state of completion. He advised that work should begin at Le Havre, whose harbour was in need of the funds for its repair. 9,000 of the sum should be devoted to this cause, with the other 3,000 put towards the château de Rouen. Then, come the next year, a further sum of 12,000 would be provided to the governor for other high-priority projects.

=== Rouen ===
==== Exiled Protestants ====
Rouen was deeply resistant to the pacification edict. The parlement of Rouen refused to register it, and the Council of Twenty-Four (the municipal council) petitioned Catherine to exempt Rouen from its provisions. This petition was denied, so they passed a law by which any Protestant involved in the 1562 coup would be prohibited from returning to Rouen, and those who were allowed to return would be disarmed. This would leave those Protestants permitted to return disarmed, while the Catholics remained under arms.

Come late April, many Protestants had still not been permitted entry into the city, let alone returned to their offices (for those who had formerly held them). The exiles spent their time in the nearby villages, knocking on the gates to demand entry. On 24 April, the Protestants dispatched two delegates to the comte de Brissac, seeking that he secure them permission to enter the city. These delegates did not reach the city to make their request, being cut down by boatmen and soldiers along the Seine. In retaliation, the Protestants destroyed the church of Le Grand-Quevilly, which was outside the walls, and assaulted several houses in the place of Croisset. Receiving word of this affair, the crown sent firm letters to the Council of Twenty-Four and parlement, and the edict of Amboise was at last put into force.

The comte de Brissac passed on the edict of Amboise to the bailli of Rouen, a certain Jean d'Estouteville, in April 1563, requesting that he quickly see to its implementation so that with all possible haste obedience to the king be re-established.

Royal troops were sent to Rouen, to protect the returning Protestants of the city. They would stay for the majority of the year and were largely successful in their mission. The maréchal de Bourdillon was also sent to Rouen to clamp down on Catholic excesses in the city.

==== Protestant return ====
The fall of the city to the royalists during the first civil war, had seen the ousting of the Protestants from the Council of Twenty-Four, that governed Rouen. Even with the return of peace, the Protestants would never again hold a place in this council. This was despite a concerted effort to see some of their number elected in 1566. Having returned to Rouen, they would work to rebuild their community. Thus, they represented 21% of the total baptisms undertaken in the city for the year 1565-1566. This figure causes Benedict to speculate the community may have been even larger than it was before the war. Nor were they any less emboldened in their ambitions of a Protestant Rouen: psalm singing in the city quickly returned, and proselytising resumed. Conversions were much rarer though, and this had the effect of ossifying and solidifying the two religious groups.

A secret printing press, operated by a Genevan printer, pumped out psalters and theological works, both for the Rouennais, and for export internationally.

==== Economic troubles ====
The particularly violent termination of Protestant rule in Rouen engendered a militant hatred of the Protestant community of the city among its Catholics. This was further amplified by the economic hardship Rouen experienced in the following decade. The return of trade was delayed by the English presence at Dieppe, and thus it was not until 1564 that merchants could return to Rouen. Further trouble came in 1565 with a sudden February thaw which wrecked many ships anchored around the city. Despite these troubles, a recovery and expansion could be witnessed between 1564 and 1568.

==== Catholic and Protestant relations ====
Mutual recrimination between Protestants and Catholics proliferated in 1563. The Protestants complained that they were denied the return of their goods and formerly held offices. The Catholics meanwhile were convinced the Protestants were stockpiling arms for an uprising.

Religious insult was an easy recourse. This is demonstrated in the case of some repairs that were being undertaken before the house of a Catholic. The tenant of the house, convinced the repairs were unnecessary, complained that they must be Protestant workmen, seeking to burden the Catholics of Rouen with unnecessary expenses.

In December, the comte de Brissac, governor of Rouen, died. He was succeeded in the charge by the sieur de La Londe.

On 5 March 1564, several hundred Protestants, returning from a service at Pavilly (on the estates of the baroness d'Esneval) under arms, traded insults with Catholics departing a Lenten sermon in the suburb of Saint-Maur. One contemporary accused the Protestants of hurling stones, another that they sang psalms to interrupt the Catholic Mass. Fighting followed, leaving two dead, and the Catholics enraged. The historian Champion records the incident differently, suggesting ten to twelve Protestants died in the confrontation. Come 8 March, in the wake of a meeting called by the priest of Saint-Nicaise, a crowd gathered outside the palais de justice (from which the parlement conducted its business) to demand action be taken against illegal Protestant worship that they believed to be taking place inside Rouen. That day, a Protestant crowd, in the parish of Saint-Eloi (where they enjoyed strength) and assaulted the parish church, breaking statues. On 9 March, a new Catholic crowd harassed and pushed the lieutenant-general of Rouen. It would only be on 10 March that order was restored.

==== Bouillon's visit ====
The Protestant duc de Bouillon, governor of Normandy, was tasked with ascertaining when he passed through the capital in late May 1564 on his way to Normandy whether the commissioners for the peace had visited Rouen. If they had not done so, he was to bring them with him to Rouen.

In June 1564, the duc de Bouillon, frequented Rouen. This was part of his first long visit to his governate since he had become Protestant. He went everywhere with a large armed guard, something further augmented by the transfer of a garrison from Bayeux to Rouen. He insisted on the return of the Protestant municipal officers who had been dispossessed to their charges. Bouillon also sought to see justice done for a crime of the civil war, with the guilty in relation to the murder of an avocat du roi arrested. The Catholics reacted virulently to Bouillon's measures, with the Council of Twenty-Four petitioning first Bouillon and then the crown. Catherine reacted with frustration to these petitions, complaining that the inhabitants of Rouen were the most difficult in the entire kingdom. Nevertheless, some of Bouillon's actions were countermanded. Vexed at this, Bouillon retired from his government to his own sovereign lands on the Eastern frontier of the kingdom, where his orders could not be overruled.

Two acts of Protestant iconoclasm occurred over the year 1564, as well as a disputation by Protestant audience members of a Catholic preacher in service.

Charles urged the aldermen of Rouen to ensure a 'just balance' between the two faiths by a letter of 28 June 1564.

Absent the duc de Bouillon, authority in Rouen fell to the lieutenant-general, the seigneur de Carrouges. Carrouges had previously served as a lieutenant to the comte de Brissac, and as such had a history of authority in the city. Carrouges' enemies tied him to the house of Lorraine-Guise, but the historian Benedict finds no indication of favouritism towards their party in his actions in Rouen.

In 1565, a royal sergeant observed a priest bearing an illegal weapon. The sergeant remarked that the Papists should all be killed as he went to arrest the offending priest. But, an assembling crowd, that had gathered to watch the arrest, realised the sergeant was Protestant. They stoned him to death, allegedly at the urgings of the Catholic priest.

Failing to elect any of their number to the council in 1566, the Protestants remonstrated with the king. They complained that the election had been dodgily run, with Protestants barred from polling places, or having their votes disregarded. Of the elected Catholics, some were ineligible, or unfit for office. In the remonstrance, the Protestants speculated that the Catholics had chosen such unfit candidates because all the worthy electoral candidates were Protestants. Benedict notes that despite how bitterly this election was contested, it did not become a violent episode.

=== Caen ===
In some places, Protestant municipal domination was held on to throughout the 1560s. In Caen, the Protestants held a great majority in the échevinage (the body of aldermen) throughout the decade. The Protestants also held many of the judicial offices of Caen in the présidial and bailliage courts (mid-level and low-level courts respectively). So too were several of the king's prominent legal office holders in the city (two of the avocats du roi and the procureur du roi.

The peace of Amboise was resented by the Protestants of Caen, who had established their ascendency during the war. The public reading of the peace was met with fury, with the monasteries of the Cordeliers and Carmelites being sacked on 11 April.

The crown dispatched the sieur de La Curée to Caen to bring about the city's compliance with the edict, hoping that his Protestantism (he had aligned himself with the Protestant rebels during the civil war) would make him an agreeable choice. His job was a difficult one, as it meant Protestant worship would be removed from the city of Caen, pushed out to the suburbs. Only the town of Vire was allocated for Protestant worship in the bailliage of Caen, but, the edict of Amboise also included provision for the continuity of Protestant worship in places it had taken place before the war. With the governor favourable, Protestant worship was able to continue in Caen's suburbs, and the community continued to grow.

==== Batresse's government ====
On 29 April, the comte de Montgommery, who had been in command of the château of Caen, handed the place to a certain sieur de Batresse. Batresse was established as lieutenant-general, and inventoried the artillery in the place.

Batresse's reputation with the crown quickly crumbled. On 3 May, the aldermen of Caen thanked Catherine for sending them such an agreeable governor as Batresse. Catherine gave thanks to the aldermen for their deference and gratitude by letter of 22 May but included note that she was hearing reports contrary to the one of obedience they had proffered her. On 27 May, the comte de Brissac, who was in Rouen, reported that he was given to understand from Batresse that a Protestant synod had transpired in Caen a few days ago, and that members of this synod had spoken in favour of an English occupation. He portrayed Caen as a vulnerable city helmed by an incompetent captain.

Rumours contrary to the professions of Caennais loyalty multiplied at court, and on 14 June the constable de Montmorency dispatched a sieur d'Hérouville to the town council of Caen. Hérouville gave warning that the king was daily receiving words of defiance of his edicts from Caen. Charles was resolved to visit Caen himself to investigate, and the constable de Montmorency wanted to see the place in good obedience for his arrival. Batresse was believed to be failing in his duties as governor, by not having achieved civil concord and the return of Catholicism to Caen.

On 20 June, an assembly was held to communicate the warning of Hêrouville to the Caennais. During the assembly, a certain lawyer complained of being harried while he and his family attempted to attend Mass. The historian Dauvin notes that this testifies to Batresse having restored Catholic worship before his departure. It was a recent restoration, as the letter of the aldermen to the constable de Montmorency of 4 July noted that Catholic worship had begun in all the churches of Caen sometime after Montmorency's June letter to the city. Dauvin concludes that progress that transpired during Batresse's tenure in the city was deemed too slow by the crown.

==== Mériten's government ====
On 4 June, Charles wrote to Caen to explain that Batresse was to be replaced by a new governor, a certain seigneur de Méritens. Before Batresse's replacement could be appointed, on 10 June, a representative of Caen travelled to the court at Vincennes to express their hope that Batresse would be given some worthy office now he was leaving the city, and their desire that he would maintain the title he had held under the authority of the seigneur de Damville (the de jure governor of Caen in absentia), even if he was no longer in the city. Dauvin in trying to explain their hesitancy around their new governor before he arrived offers the possibility that Batresse had dragged his name through the mud for the notables in advance of his arrival, or that as a captain of the French bands he might have had a reputation for anti-Protestant firmness. The Caennais representative was not granted an audience with Catherine, but met with one of the secretaries of state, and with Damville, who told the council of Caen to stop complaining about their new governor.

By letters of 11 June 1563, a Béarnais captain was appointed as lieutenant-general of Caen, the seigneur de Méritens. His letter of appointment granted him extraordinary powers above and beyond that typically afforded a governor. Indeed, his authority would be parallel in totality to the de jure governor of Caen, the seigneur de Damville. He came on the recommendation of the king's tutor, Cipierre and also, Dauvin speculates, perhaps his superior officer, the colonel-general of the French infantry, the comte de Strozzi.

Méritens would hold the charge of lieutenant-general of Caen for the next fifteen years. Dauvin describes him as a harsh governor, noting a contemporary opinion that he was more severe to the Caennais than was necessary. He would not advise the city council of Caen of his arrival, and it would be a messenger of the departing Batresse that alerted the council to his having arrived on 4 July. Méritens arrived with his company of French infantry. Méritens enjoyed access to an informant in the French court, who appraised him of developments at the centre of power in the coming years that Méritens passed on to the lieutenant-general of lower-Normandy, the seigneur de Matignon. The captain was an admirer of the late duc de Guise.

==== Méritens arrives ====
On 4 July, a skirmish took place outside the church of Saint-Pierre. In the official report of the incident, a band of armed men were said to be roaming the street crying 'death to Protestants', leaving a great many wounded in the commotion (though they struck those they attacked with the 'flat of the blade'). The account implied that the attacking soldiers were outsiders, emphasising the use of the term Mordieux, which was typically of southern French origin. Dauvin postulates that the men were from Méritens arriving company, and might have been in the church to verify the reports at the court, before having a run in with some Protestants. He offers the possibility that the Protestants had been insulting the Gascons, and that their decision to use the flat of their blades in assaulting the Protestants was a response designed to keep things in proportion.

The council of Caen remained in entirely Protestant hands until the return of the sieur de Bras, who presided over the assembly of 6 June. In August, Bras was charged with investigating the sack of Troarn Abbey, deputised under the authority of the royal commissioners for Normandy, Violle and La Guesle who would arrive in Caen personally on 14 August. This offered Bras the opportunity to settle scores, and reaffirm authority he had lost in the preceding months. Damning testimonies were heard concerning the conduct of the seigneur d'Igny and Gilles de Benneville for their involvement in the affair (both being present during the sacking.)

==== Royal entry ====
Mêritens would meet with the constable de Montmorency as he prepared for the royal Entry into Caen on 23 August 1563 (the court fresh off its time in Rouen). This was the first royal Entry Caen had enjoyed since 1532. It had been demanded that part of the wall be torn down for the Entry, this being the practice of humiliating a conquered city.

The king and his mother entered via the Millet gate after meeting with various grandees outside the walls. It is unclear whether the section of walls that had been ordered torn down had been removed. Inside the city, Charles was gifted a rich Spanish horse. There is no mention of a Te Deum being performed to greet the king, or his entry concluding at a church. This contrasts sharply with his recent entry into Rouen. The clerk that recorded the event contrasted the hospitality shown the king with the sovereign's coldness. Dauvin explains the latter by the secular, un-Catholic nature of the greeting the king received, contrary to the crown's expectations of the post-Amboise order of things. Charles and Catherine were in Caen from 24 to 28 August. The king did not move about Caen much during his stay, largely confining himself to the château and the Abbaye aux Dames. Charles was silent on the matter of confirming the city in its privileges, and thus legal prerogatives the Caennais theoretically enjoyed were left in a state of ambiguity.

Shortly after the royal visit, Charles re-established the office of receveur des aides et des tailles in the city, returning direct taxation in the city to private hands rather than allowing the municipality responsibility for the taxes. The new office holder showed a lack of leniency towards the Caennais.

==== Military occupation of Caen ====
On 31 August, the comte de Brissac proposed to remove the soldiers currently stationed in the city if the city paid up immediately a quarter of the 15,000 livres subsidy the king had demanded. The supposed wealthiest inhabitant of Caen offered to advance the sum in return for reimbursement out of the vicomté's (viscounty's) revenues. Brissac continued the extortion in September, proposing that ninety-six residents of Caen each pay 1,960 livres. Though payments were made, the soldiers did not depart Caen.

A week after Charles' departure, the seigneur de Méritens imposed a humiliating measure upon the civilian apparatus of the city. Brissac had permitted him, on the grounds of security, to occupy the hôtel de ville (city hall) and expel the aldermen. On 8 September, the outraged city council sent a delegation to the comte de Brissac composed of the seigneur de Bras and several others. The meeting with Brissac achieved nothing and they yielded the hôtel de ville to the military authority, finding themselves compelled to rent their meeting place in the Vaucelles suburbs. After a month of this humiliation, they moved back into the city proper on 25 October, requisitioning the fr:collège des arts for their meetings.

September would however represent the first reduction in the size of Méritens' company, being reduced from three hundred to two hundred men. Over the period 1563 to 1566 his force would slowly be drawn down until by early 1566 he had only one hundred men. Méritens protested against the reduction in size of his company, writing to the lieutenant-general of lower Normandy in March 1564.

On 20 November, the exiled municipal council learned that Charles had renewed their rights to the salt storehouse of Caen. This allowed for a levy that would be used for the fortifications of Caen. The military nature of this grant meant little softening the bitterness felt by the civic authorities of Caen.

A meeting of Protestant ministers in the city was prohibited around December 1563, on the grounds that it might play host to seditious discussions.

The seigneur de Méritens assumed control over the city walls of Caen and usurped a revenue stream relating to them around this time, according to the seigneur de Bras.

The municipality was not always able to financially support the burden of the garrison imposed upon them, and thus Méritens complained in March 1564 that he had to advance the money himself to meet the food needs of his soldiery.

Even after peace was made with England in April 1564, Méritens maintained his control over the city walls of Caen and the hôtel de ville. His soldiers continued to patrol the city streets.

Lodgings for Méritens garrison was complicated by the paucity of barracks in this period. Thus, they had to be quartered on the population, an unpopular measure. In September 1564, the duc de Bouillon emphasised that the allocation of places for Méritens' soldiers was the responsibility of the legal authorities in collaboration with the municipality. A list of residents to house the soldiers was forwarded to the governor, with lodging slips distributed to the involved households so they might claim compensation. Abuses were common with an unwanted guest in the home who was often drunk and violent. The seigneur de Batresse had largely avoided quartering soldiers on the Caennais, with only twelve households mentioned in orders of 29 April 1563. On 6 February 1564, the duc de Bouillon ordered forty houses proximate to the château be selected for quartering. By order of 22 September, a further eighty households were required under the same requirements. Protestant households faced a higher concentration of the responsibility to quarter the soldiers. Dauvin explains that wealthier households tended to hold a larger burden of the responsibility, and wealthier individuals in Caen biased towards Protestantism. Méritens too was inclined to place a greater responsibility for the task on Protestant heads.

==== Judicial reform ====
The king withdrew cognisance of civil cases from the présidial court of Caen on 8 December 1563. Four years later, Charles would be ordering the parlement of Rouen to register this decision. This petition to the parlement suggested that the limiting of the présidial court was a measure that had origins in Caen itself. At this time the rivalry between the seigneur de Bras and the seigneur d'Igny was live, and the move was of benefit to the bailliage and municipality. The parlement obstructed this measure of the king.

In examining the cause of this effort, Dauvin sees Charles' hatred of the Protestant dominated présidial court, as well as the alienation that might have been burgeoning between the city council and the présidial court (the former feeling they were being punished for the rebelliousness of the latter). Perhaps too it was a way for the aldermen to get their foot back in the door of the hôtel de ville.

==== New elections ====
On 15 February 1564, municipal elections were undertaken for new aldermen. By this means, Caen regained control of an institution which had been prorogued by the duc de Bouillon in September 1562. The seigneur de Bras presided over the election and proposed a list of candidates which contained four Protestants and two Catholics. Re-establishing a Catholic majority on the council was not felt to be feasible, but Bras hoped to fill the council with moderate Protestants. Bras' list carried the day, securing thirty-eight votes, to the full Protestant list of the seigneur d'Igny which carried twenty. Igny's play to secure a fully Protestant slate for the municipality came at a time when the trial against him, overseen by Bras was still ongoing. In June 1564, the trial was transferred to the purview of the présidial court where Igny and his allies held sway. No punishments for the desecration of the abbey would be forthcoming.

By the terms of the edict of Crémieu, the election process of February 1564 was called into question. The new system involved the submission of twelve names who had attained the most votes to the governor of Normandy (the duc de Bouillon). Charles would then choose six of the twelve men as aldermen determining those most interested in the public tranquillity. The city council set about this process on 26 August 1564 and determined that the six existing aldermen were legitimate. From Avignon in October, Charles made his choices, with three aldermen continuing from before the election, and three new appointments. The new composition was again four Protestant and two Catholic names. Charles did not factor in the number of votes received, and even picked a Protestant who had been involved in the iconoclasm of the first civil war. Dauvin imagines that Charles was ill-informed about the candidates he was choosing, and might have suspected that because he was picking men who had received fewer votes, that he was picking Catholics.

==== Méritens' growing jurisdiction ====
Méritens quickly expanded his authority beyond Caen to the surrounds, including nearby Bayeux. Thus, in a letter of 21 March 1564, he informed the seigneur de Matignon that he was taking charge of investigating an outrage that had taken place here. Dauvin finds this surprising, as the incident would have more naturally been the responsibility of the captain of Bayeux. In 1565 this was taken further, with a corporal under Méritens' authority commanding in Bayeux.

In addition to Bayeux, Méritens also exerted influence over nearby Falaise. Dauvin sees practical and economic justification for this in the relative significance of Caen. Thus, when soldiers were needed for Bayeux and Falaise in July 1563, Méritens' men in Caen were a logical choice for sending to the places.

Through his influence in these places, Méritens kept an eye on developments there, reporting to the seigneur de Matignon in 1564 of the movements of the seigneur de Colombières. The goings of Colombières and his company of armed horsemen would be a matter that Méritens returned to repeatedly in his correspondence with Matignon. He suggested that he would military intervene to stop Colombières illegally arming men, however, no clash between the men ever occurred despite Méritens' frequent knowledge of his location. Méritens observed but did not act.

The governor's observations were frequently second hand, and this was a source of anxiety for Méritens as to their credibility. Dauvin observes that all Méritens' letters about Colombières' military efforts, as well as his report on the threat to Matignon's life coincided with the making of peace with England, thereby the removal of a threat to Caen, and thus possibly explaining the reports he was making as a reaction to a fear that he might see his garrison and responsibilities drawn down.

==== Plots and threats ====
On 20 June 1565, the seigneur de Méritens reported on the capture of two agents of the comte de Montgommery in Caen. He suggested in his correspondence to the seigneur de Matignon that the local judiciary, including the seigneur de Bras, would be lenient to the men, an accusation Dauvin finds to be borderline slanderous. Two weeks prior to the arrest of these spies, Charles had ordered Méritens to shed another one hundred men from his company.

The continuity of peace was a threat to Méritens' influence and power. He regularly offered the spectre of danger to Matignon to justify the maintenance of his position, the possibility of returning to Protestant ruled Béarn being an unappealing one.

==== Return to old methods ====
In February 1567, Charles permitted Caen to return to its traditional method of election. However, for the vote to be valid it would have to take place in the presence of the seigneur de Méritens. Despite his presence, the Protestants continued to be confirmed as aldermen on the council. In May, Charles ordered that henceforth town council sessions be held in the presence of the procureur-syndic (also a Protestant). Decisions made in this officer's absence could be nullified by the king.

On 7 August 1567, the seigneur de Méritens announced his absence, as he made south for his homeland of Béarn. In his absence, he left two officers in the château.

=== Le Havre ===
Shortly after the recapture of Le Havre, in July, the procureur du roi of the city travelled to meet with the royal family. He threw himself at Catherine's feet and was able to secure the preservation of the city's charter of privileges.

In August 1563, Le Havre, was punished for its treasonable allegiance. The bourgeois militia was suspended, the civic elite dismissed, and five companies of French infantry imposed as a garrison, to be paid for by the populace. A new governor was appointed for the city, a member of the French bands of infantry, subordinate to the comte de Brissac, the seigneur de Sarlabous.

Sarlabous instituted a new process for the aldermen of Le Havre by which he would confirm the candidates after their Catholicity was demonstrated.

=== Dieppe ===
The Protestants of Dieppe were ill inclined to see the return of Catholicism to the city. They appealed to the sieur de La Curée to provide them a Protestant captain, whom they would find it easier to obey. They also wrote to the prince de Condé on 20 April 1563 to demand a Protestant governor. This was to avoid the evil of religious plurality that would disunite the city. They extolled the virtue of Protestantism's impact on Dieppe, noting that they all lived freely and at peace.

The Protestant governor of Dieppe, the sieur de La Curée was replaced by the comte de Brissac with a certain sieur de Sigogne in August 1563. Alongside the choices of governor in Caen and Le Havre, he was a man of the French old bands of infantry, under the charge of the comte de Brissac. Dauvin puts these various efforts in a broader context of enforcement of the edict of Amboise in Normandy, under the auspices of the comte de Brissac who had a dual authority over the men (as colonel-general of the French infantry, and also a maréchal with oversight for Normandy).

The historian Champion records an incident relating to Dieppe from early 1565. Norman Protestants had sacked several churches, and the governor of Dieppe had attacked the responsible band, imprisoning some. The imprisoned Protestants had been sprung from captivity, with their guards killed.

Receiving word of this episode while the court was in Toulouse, Catherine declared that the proper response was to punish the Protestants. The constable de Montmorency and the present cardinals supported this resolution. The chancellor L'Hôpital opposed it, making an appeal for mercy, and noting that while such retribution might feel satisfactory today, it was necessary to take the long-term view.

=== Other places ===
Condé wrote to the seigneur de Matignon concerning Protestant worship in the place of Alençon on 10 November 1565. He explained that the Protestants of Alençon had come to him, to express their frustration that their worship had been curtailed. Condé wrote that it had previously been permitted within the terms of the edict of Amboise under the auspices of a pastor named Merlin. Matignon had however suspended it on the grounds that they had preached in an orchard in the suburbs of Alençon, that it had taken into communion those from outside the bailliage of Alençon, and that Merlin had taken a nun as his wife. Condé explained that Charles had written to reinstate Merlin in his ministry and allow him to live with his wife. Thus, Condé was adding his voice to the request, that Matignon not prohibit worship which was legal by the terms of the edict of Amboise. As Condé saw it, the practice of religion was a crucial bond by which loyalty to a prince was maintained.

At nearby Argentan, a place of weaker Protestant strength, the commissioners Jacques Viole and Jehan de La Guesle denied a request by the Protestants to establish a place of worship for themselves there on the grounds they already enjoyed one at Alençon.

The Protestants of the stronghold of Saint-Lô resisted efforts to demolish their town walls.

In May 1564, the crown ruled that a Protestant minister of Normandy who was holding an illegal service should be arrested. But, balancing this out, a Catholic priest who had initiated a disturbance was to be likewise arrested. Both men would then be deported from Normandy, with their supporters fined.

With the king's great-aunt Renée (the daughter of king Louis XII) proving to be sympathetic to the Protestants, Charles ordered the removal from her control of a bailliage she had been ceded in Normandy. It was to return to the authority of the governor of Normandy. Henceforth, she would not involve herself in the affairs of this bailliage.

== Picardy ==
In the estimation of Labourdette, it was in Picardy that the Protestants offered the greatest amount of defiance towards the pacification edict. The king ordered that the Protestants should return churches and items they had taken from the Catholics, as well as tithes. In several places, Charles also observed armed preparations were being undertaken in the province. He therefore looked to ensure the border fortresses were in a proper state of readiness. D'Humières, the governor of Péronne and lieutenant-general of Picardy was instructed in December 1566 to return to his charge if he was not there presently. Charles warned d'Humières that he had been appraised of disturbances in Picardy and he should be on the lookout for armed assemblies and gatherings. This included subjects of the king crossing the frontier to foment rebellion in the Spanish Netherlands.

=== Amiens ===
In Amiens, the council was highly resistant to the peace of Amboise. Hoping to see the site of Protestant worship allocated to the region moved further away from their city, they appealed to the prince de Condé, governor of Picardy, for redress on the matter. Condé, though Protestant, little desired to attract the ire of the capital of his governate. He therefore compromised concerning the site of worship. This was to the frustration of his deputy, the seigneur de Sénarpont who championed the cause of the persecuted Protestants of Amiens. Protestants would not be permitted to return to city office in Amiens and would go to their services armed with hidden weapons for fear of attack.

=== Boulogne ===
The Protestant governor of Boulogne-sur-Mer, the seigneur de Morvilliers enforced a harsh policy to ensure religious peace in his city. The punishment for causing religious discord was to be death.

=== Soissons ===
In defiance of the king, Condé permitted Protestant worship in the city of Soissons.

=== Montdidier ===
In Montdidier, dispute between Protestants and Catholics arose over the election of the city's mayor. Due to the proximate location of the French border to Montdidier, the king was keen to see magistrates in the place who were not consumed by religious passions. He hoped to see peace and security maintained in Montdidier.

=== Laon ===
At Laon, in 1565, the municipal authorities ignored Protestant objections to a tax levied on them, on the grounds that Catholics had had to face similar exactions.

=== Other places ===
Writing to the seigneur d'Humières on 15 April 1564, Condé explained that he was aware of Protestants at Roye, Le Plessier, Guerbigny, Crapeaumesnil and other nearby places who wished to quietly exercise their faith. He explained that he had been petitioned by them, as they were fearful they might be prevented by Humières from conducting their worship. Condé explained that he felt it wrong to deny people the practice of their religion, and he had thus allowed them to worship on his lands around Roye (as well as its suburbs), in addition to the place of Cany if they conducted themselves peaceably.

== Champagne and the Three Bishoprics ==
The death of governor François II de Clèves and ascent of the house of Lorraine-Guise to the administration of Champagne changed the relationship of the provincial government towards the Protestants. During the minority of the duc de Guise, his uncle, the duc d'Aumale governed Champagne in his stead. The Guise government, and the urban governors, largely drawn from the noblesse seconde and outsiders to the cities they governed, were in sync with the municipal governments of Champagne during this period. Both groups saw the value in limiting Protestant worship as much as possible, within the confines of the edict of Amboise.

Though the royal policy was at this time one of religious conciliation, Champenois nobles of the noblesse seconde could find prospects of advancement shuttered to them through their conversion to Protestantism. For example, the baron de Jours who had enjoyed a career filled with honours found the well dried up in the last few years of his life after he converted to Protestantism in 1561.

=== Troyes ===
In the city of Troyes in Champagne, word of the peace prompted hurried action from the Catholic administration to kill Protestant prisoners in their custody before the amnesty clause of the peace took effect. The local contemporary Pierre Pithou ascribed involvement to the mayor, Claude Pinette, in these murders. The historian Roberts suspects the hand of a local official behind the killings. At Easter, the surviving Protestant prisoners received Catholic communion, fearing the consequences if they refused.

On 25 March, the funeral cortège of the recently assassinated duc de Guise (father of the new governor) arrived in Troyes, as part of its journey to Joinville. Some Troyen Protestants warned of the possibility that the reception of the body might be liable to prove an instigator of violence against them, but this was ignored. Catholic soldiers, supposedly in revenge for the death of the duc, subjected Protestant homes to pillage and vandalism.

==== Publishing of the edict of Amboise ====
On 19 April, the edict of Amboise was published at the siège présidial (the seat of the présidial court) and introduced to Troyes by the seigneur de Barbezieulx, the new lieutenant-governor of Champagne. This instigated new protest from the council, who resolved to undertake door to door inquiries of Troyes, surveying religion and thoughts about the proximity of the Protestant worship that its acceptance entailed. The Protestants noted that the Catholic militia accompanied these interviews, and saw the whole exercise as one of coercion, rather than an attempt to gauge sentiment. The historian Roberts moderates this attitude, noting that some degree of protection for those undertaking such a job was probably felt to be necessary in the days after a delicate peace had been established. Some Protestants, forewarned of the survey, absented themselves, while others answered in ambiguous ways, both as to their religion and as to their preference on religious sites (a matter which they stated was the king's business). Around thirty of the surviving Catholic respondents proved militantly Catholic, indicating they would rather die than allow Protestant worship to take place near Troyes, others expressed the view that they would leave Troyes in such an eventuality. By and large, the concern was to see further violence avoided, which Roberts suggests indicates that the chief problem for many Catholics was the possibility of friction between themselves and their Protestant neighbours by the permitting of divergent worship. She contrasts the lack of uniformity in the responses recorded with the unanimous opposition to the restoration of the Mass in a similar survey undertaken in Protestant held Millau.

Protestants returning to Troyes in April and May were butchered by soldiers. With soldiers still stationed at the gates of Troyes, many Protestants decided against returning. Other Protestants, who were in Troyes, were subject to attack, with one murdered. Those who sought to prosecute the man's killers were subject to threats.

==== Site of worship ====
It would be a suburb of Troyes that received the designation for the site of Protestant worship in the bailliage of Troyes. This occasioned protest from the authorities who felt it too close to the city. In May 1563, the Protestants secured the affirmation of this site for their worship from the crown. The implementation of this was to be found lacking. In December, the crown devolved the right to pick the site to the provincial governor. As the duc de Guise's stand-in, the duc d'Aumale selected Aix-en-Othe which was so far away from Troyes that it was not even in the same bailliage. This was then amended to Céant-en-Othe, which was on the edge of the bailliage and around 18-20 miles from Troyes. The Protestants protested to Aumale that this was not an appropriate site, and were determined not to accept its use, unless it prejudiced their chance of getting an alternative from the king during the royal tour of the kingdom. Their petition unsuccessful, they conceded to using Céant, with services beginning on 30 April 1564.

Representatives continued to be sent, both directly to the king, and via the prince de Condé seeking amelioration concerning this circumstance. The distance of the site ultimately settled on, from the city of Troyes, would serve as what Roberts describes as one of the most effective demoralisers of the Protestant community of Troyes. To the vexation of the Catholics, in 1565, a service and baptism was held at the house of a certain Ménisson, at Dosches, which was only 2 leagues out from Troyes. Ménisson, as a local noble, claimed freedom of worship on his estates. While nobles such as these were beyond prosecution, the Protestants returning from services could be attacked. A relative of Ménisson, the seigneur de Saint-Pouange petitioned the Troyen council in April 1565 to secure worship on his estates. Saint-Pouange, an écuyer (squire) in Condé's household had bought up seigneuries around Troyes including Saint-Pouange (which was around 10km south of Troyes) Montreuil-sur-Barse, Montiéramey, Vendeuvre, Saint-Aventin, Mesnil-Saint-Père, and Courteranges, all in the environs of the city. In all these places he permitted Protestant worship to take place. The council refused to countenance this, but nevertheless services began there. The complaints about the conduct of these nobles reached even Charles (the council having petitioned Aumale to raise the matter with him), who highlighted to Saint-Pouange that his estates were not a suitable site for worship as he was not lord of the relevant castles. Ménisson ignored the prohibition.

On 1 May 1564, Protestants returning from a service at Céant were subject to insults and the throwing of stones.

An ambush was laid for the Protestants that returned from a service at Dosches in 1565.

==== Anti-Protestant ordinance ====
In June 1563, all those suspected of Protestantism were excluded from guard duty but nevertheless obliged to pay for the Catholics who would replace them.

The duc d'Aumale, stand-in for the young duc de Guise as governor of Champagne, was due to visit Troyes at this time. The council looked to seize upon the moment with an anti-Protestant ordinance. The carrying of arms would be prohibited outside the context of guard duty, with all weapons deposited in the Cordeliers and Jacobin households that only the mayor and bailli (bailiff, agent of the bailliage court) would have the key for. All assemblies would be prohibited. Quarrelling over religion was prohibited. The eating of meat and working would be banned on days of Catholic significance. Protestants would be banned from municipal office, as well as the manufacture or trade of weapons. Finally, those Protestants absent from Troyes for more than a year would be barred from re-entering the city.

Pithou described the process of searching for arms as an opportunity for further harassment of the Protestants. The most militant Catholics were chosen for the roles, and alongside their official duties, they destroyed books and insulted the Protestants (with a particular focus on Protestant women). In one quarter, the inhabitants were forced to declare their religion and expelled from Troyes if they answered Protestant. Appeals against this treatment were ignored.

==== End of the Catholic monopoly ====
By the start of 1564, tempers were cooling. Barbezieulx secured the return of the Protestants to the council. Back in some measure of political power, the Protestants now looked to protest against the levies that had been imposed upon them during the civil war.

Despite this progress, the murder of Protestants continued, with little in the way of consequence for the perpetrators. In such instances as Catholic justices were willing to pursue a prosecution, violent threats dissuaded them from following through.

The murder of a militant Catholic in 1564, was assumed to be the work of the Protestants. A gang assembled to revenge themselves against Protestants and their property.

==== Prorogued election ====
The French crown intervened in the municipal elections of 1564 in Troyes, providing a degree of tolerance to the proceedings. The election resulted in a slate of candidates hostile to the previous Catholic administration and its mayor Pinette. Pinette and the old aldermen protested to the king, who annulled the election. New elections were held on 7 September 1564 but delivered the same result. Pinette and his allies then appealed to the duc d'Aumale. Aumale spoke with the king and received permission to allow Pinette and the old aldermen to continue in their offices despite the elections.

The occasion of a Catholic procession proved to be the nucleus for a confrontation. The Protestants of Troyes continued to work along the route, to the scandal of the Catholics.

In 1566, effort was made to exclude from election those who had represented the radical Catholics in 1562.

Tensions were raised in the summer of 1567 by the discovery of secret Protestant worship occurring on the rue de La Grande Tannerye.

=== Châlons ===
==== Return of the Protestants ====
Many Protestants had fled from Châlons during the first French War of Religion to Strasbourg. Of the twenty-one families who had fled there, twenty would return in the spring of 1563. Among them were five former councillors, who now sought to return to their old positions on the council of Châlons, but were rebuffed. These ex-councillors appealed to the bailli of Vermandois, who ruled for them. A counter appeal was then lodged by the procureur of Châlons, which went before the parlement of Paris. They were fortified in their position by the duc d'Aumale, with the procureur declaring on 23 October 1563 that the duc d'Aumale had instructed them to continue to deny the Protestant councillors their places. The matter would not be resolved until the visit of the king on the royal tour, when the councillors were reinstated.

Though the duc d'Aumale resisted, the Protestants returned to the city council without incident.

==== Bussy against the council ====
The seigneur de Bussy attempted to impose a company under a certain captain d'Estrées on the city of Châlons on 7 April 1563, on the grounds that he had been informed a host of men were assembling at the village of Bricquenay with plans to assault Châlons after Easter. Little believing Bussy, the council of Châlons resolved to dispatch representatives to Bricquenay themselves. If there was merit to what Bussy said, the city would do what was required.

Bussy again requested the council permit the lodging of troops a few days later, on the grounds of the passage of the Protestant reiters (pistol armed mercenary cavalry) under the command of the prince de Porcien. Rather than assent, the council looked to ascertain the route Porcien would be taking. Bussy was apoplectic, announcing he intended to abandon the city, and was returning the keys to the place to a certain Castel. The council then made conciliatory gestures, but Bussy would not allow them to meet. The governor complained to the queen mother concerning the council. Catherine in turn referred the matter to the duc d'Aumale. Aumale wrote a scathing letter to the council, excoriating them for their treatment of the seigneur de Bussy. He announced his imminent arrival and noted he would punish their sedition. Suitably chastised, the council sent representatives to meet with Bussy, to offer their apologies and find out what had caused him anguish. The seigneur de Bussy relented and allowed the council to meet again.

Only a little while later, on 27 April, when Bussy ordered the council accept one-hundred soldiers into the city, the council argued back that Châlons had always enjoyed an exemption from garrisons, that they were in a state of concord, and the mercenaries were marching at some distance from the city. They noted that were open to Bussy's request if he could produce an order to that effect from king Charles or the duc d'Aumale. Bussy explained the command was a verbal one. It would not be until the duc d'Aumale arrived in Châlons in May that four companies of infantry were imposed on the city.

==== Protestant survival ====
Though Protestant worship was not legal in Châlons, the community rebuilt itself in the city. Konnert suspects they met unofficially, lacking a pastor. In April 1564, Châlons sent lay representatives to the provincial Protestant synod of La Ferté-sous-Jouarre. They expressed their right to recall their pastor (who had retired to Sedan) at such time as it was possible to officially re-establish their church. Konnert finds it notable that although certainly aware of the Protestant activities in their city, the council minutes were silent on the matter.

By letter of 31 July 1566, d'Espaulx ordered the Châlons council to pay particular mind to the security of their city. This was a response to the Habsburg efforts to recapture Metz from France.

=== Mézières ===
Mézières, as part of the duché de Rethel was under the stewardship of the duc de Nevers. Nevers' deputy in the city was a certain Pierre de La Vieuville. In 1567, La Vieuville imposed a new constitutional arrangement on Mézières. Where before, the seven aldermen had been selected by a group of three men who were themselves elected by the bourgeois of Mézières. Now instead of the bourgeois choosing the three men who selected the aldermen, it would instead be the militia officers. This was a cause of vexation.

=== Provins ===
The first président of the présidial court of the city of Provins resisted attempts by the crown to allow worship for their city's Protestant community. They argued that the king had only granted this to the Protestants of Provins because he had been lied to about their number among the community. To illustrate that they were but a small minority that did not require satisfaction, he is supposed to have invited the Protestants of Provins to appear before him that very day, to provide their names and signatures for a list. The historian Christin sees this as a case in which an argument from majority was used to intimidate a minority community.

The Protestants of Provins, lacking suburbs in their city, hoped to see their worship conducted within the walls of Provins. This contravention of the edict of Amboise would not be permitted, and they were compelled to use a field for their worship.

At Provins, in 1566, a Catholic procession collided with Protestants returning from their service. Both sides attempted to drown out the other with their singing. The affair quickly descended into violence.

=== Reims ===
The Protestants had essentially no presence in Reims, and their worship was determined to take place at Crépy-en-Valois for the bailliage. Despite this, Protestants illegally assembled at nearby Bezannes and Warmeriville. The seigneur de Warmeriville was a man of Reims, the général des finances and a one-time lieutenant of the city. After the death of the prince de Porcien in 1567, he took on the role of military leadership for the Protestants of northern Champagne.

=== Other places ===
In the place of Sézanne, the comte de Cheverny was entrusted with a pacification mission in March 1564.

The Catholics of Langres made the case that the local Protestant population could not attend service in nearby Montsaugeon, as that was a part of a different bailliage. Per the edict of Amboise, they had a duty to go to the further away site of worship for the bailliage that Langres was a part of.

=== Three Bishoprics ===
The cardinal de Lorraine meddled in Holy Roman affairs through his involvement with the diocese of Metz, Toul and Verdun. His agent would provoke a private war in Metz, as well as a flurry of Protestant pamphlets decrying his role.

Confessional relations between Catholics and Protestants in Metz were on the brink of war by 1566.

== Burgundy and the Nivernais ==
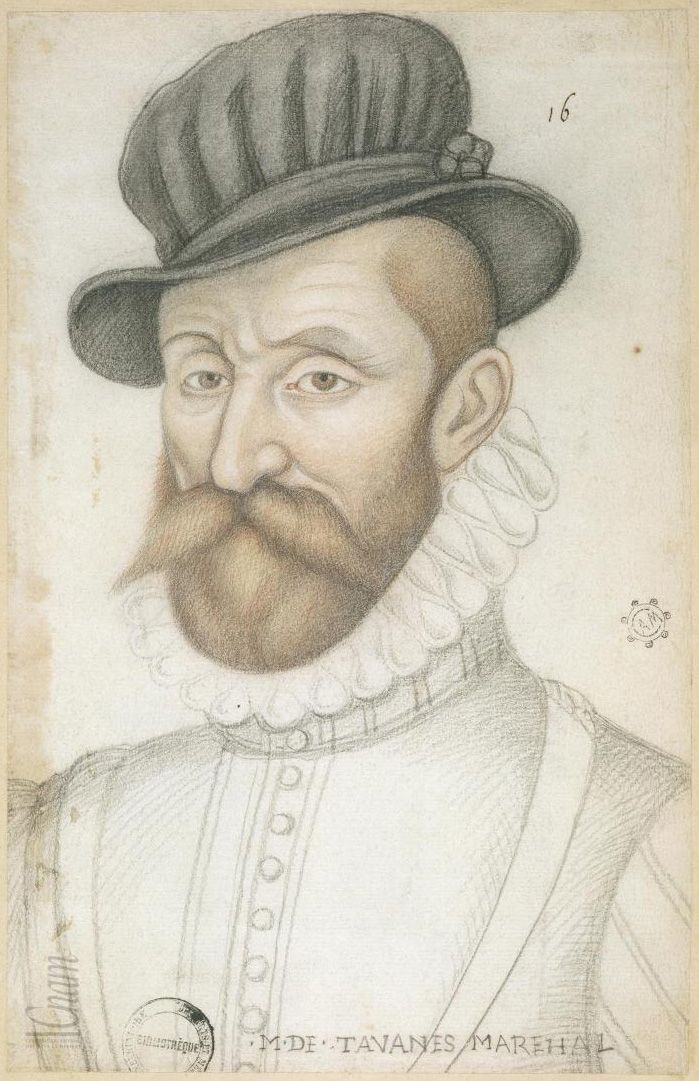
Seigneur de Tavannes, lieutenant-general of the province of Burgundy, and leading opponent of the edict of Amboise

In Burgundy, the provincial lieutenant-general, the seigneur de Tavannes, pursued anti-Protestantism with vigour. He was hostile to the peace, describing it as an 'edict of the Huguenot religion'. The lieutenant-general argued that Burgundy was a border province, and thus must be treated differently with respect to the edict of Amboise. He kept the places of his province in an armed peace, with towns obliged to maintain watches and guards. The historian Christin observes that Tavannes married his proclamations of loyalty to king Charles with a minimal application of the edict of Amboise and the fostering of confessional solidarity. After being forced to register the edict, over the protests of the parlement, Dijon city council and provincial Estates, the opposition of the Catholics in Burgundy was only strengthened. They now turned themselves to legal warfare. Catholic authorities and Protestant communities were consumed by litigation. Wherever there was a point of ambiguity in the edict, Tavannes would always ensure that it was interpreted in the most restrictive and inconvenient way for the Protestants. In this effort to maintain the Protestants as a vulnerable and ever challenged minority, he was supported by the parlement and city councils.

For example, the royal requirement of obedience before peace was exploited in May to demand that only the Protestants had to disarm until such time as the Protestant held city of Lyon returned to royal obedience. The Catholic authorities also legally challenged the commissioners sent to enforce the edict in Burgundy. Tavannes himself entered into lawsuits with the commissioners.

Tavannes, the parlements and city councils had good opportunities to be vexatious in the allocation of sites of Protestant worship as mandated by the edict of Amboise. In addition to this were sites of burial and the distribution of expenses.

To the end of seeing the edicts of pacification properly enforced throughout the kingdom, the king ordered the various governors and lieutenant-generals of the French provinces to conduct tours of their provinces. He was greatly satisfied by the one undertaken by the seigneur de Tavannes in Burgundy and made his pleasure known to Tavannes in a correspondence of April 1567.

=== Commissioners ===
The official royal commissioners for Burgundy were the Parisien parlementaires Étienne Charlet and Jean de Monceaux. They would subsequently be reinforced in their mission by the councillors Jean Bataille and Jean Moisson, and then even later the provincial parlementaires Nicole de Recourt and Maclou Popon. Though there were many figures involved in the pacification of Burgundy, Charlet would have exclusive prerogatives over the Nivernais. Charlet's Catholic orthodoxy had come in for question during the civil war. Monceaux meanwhile had absented himself from the oath of Catholicity the parlement undertook.

Starting in December 1563, Tavannes would enter a two year long dispute with the king's commissioners. Tavannes would emerge from this fight triumphant. The nucleus of the quarrel concerned a certain Pierre Queret's petition, as he had departed Chalon during the first war, and in his absence all his goods had been sold off, as well as those of his wife. He urged the commissioners to restore his property to him. Tavannes argued against this on several fronts. Firstly, the grounds of the requisitions having been undertaken due to the necessities of war. Secondly, the edict of Amboise was ambiguous and the 'judicial' approach to the matter would engender hatreds in the people rather than facilitating peace. Tavannes would thus chastise the commissioners in 1565 for stirring the pot.

He made an offer that in genuine circumstances of injustice, such as those where people were evicted from their homes against the ruling of the edict of Amboise, he would provide them the means to remedy the situation, rather than going down the path of lawsuits. By this means, he made himself the arbiter, over the commissioners. He had the power to circumvent the commissioners and appeal straight to the king's council, or indeed the king himself. Thus, the authority the crown invested its commissioners with proved insufficient.

Tavannes would claim, in June 1565, that he had risked both his person and property in service of seeing the king's commissioners obeyed.

=== Catholic Leagues ===
Leagues (known as the confréries du Saint-Esprit - confraternities of the Holy Spirit) emerged in Burgundy under the leadership of the lieutenant-general of the province, the seigneur de Tavannes in July 1567. Holt describes the sole purpose of this confraternity as the elimination of Protestantism in Burgundy, by means of offering a cover for the raising of shock troops.

By the terms of the League, in the service of the king, its members would devote their life and property to the Catholic religion and against the Protestants. Those in the confraternity had to swear an oath to maintain the secrecy of the organisation and not associate with Protestants. Men would also be raised. Unlike more traditional confraternities, the entire social body was brought together as one, rather than being segmented by trade, or specific saint cult. The more traditional elements of the fraternal order could also be found: mutual aid, funerals for members and the promise of attendance of Mass on All Saints' Day.

As for the legality of the organisation, it was serving Catholicism against Protestant heresy, and that served as sufficient justification. The references to the king in their oath were more to serve as a form of pressure on the crown than an obedience. Similar organisations were founded in Dijon, Beaune, Chalon, Tournus and Mâcon.

In Mâcon, the membership was weighted towards the more well-to-do members of the community. In Dijon by contrast, vignerons (wine growers) had already demonstrated their mobilisation in favour of the Catholic cause.

In every town that subscribed to a league a militia and surveillance committee was created. Dijon, Autun and Chalon boasted reserves of money for the maintenance of soldiers and the employment of spies. The leader of the committee in Chalon was called the prior and enjoyed the captaincy of the citadel of Chalon. Tavannes conducted a census of the Catholic forces and saw to their organising. The richest members of the towns would require horses for when fighting broke out, the more middling sorts, arquebuses. Tavannes' son would speak on the anti-Protestant character of these leagues. By them, the tool of the Protestants could be turned against them. The possibility of federating these leagues between the towns, either to the level of the bailliage or to the province was considered by some. Pernot sees in the Burgundian leagues, a forerunner of the later national Catholic League.

=== Dijon ===
In Dijon, Tavannes urged the city to maintain its night watch due to the daily sight of 'foreigners bearing weapons' in the city. Protestants attempts to maintain either parity, or even token representation on the city council were shot down.

For the Protestants of Dijon, as far as the city council was concerned, they could either depart from the city with their property forfeit, or stay, and attend Catholic Mass. Those who stayed had their houses searched for arms and munitions, and their Protestant servants imprisoned or deported. They were also subject to curfew and obligations to keep their businesses shut during Catholic feast days and services.

The authorities of Dijon in their objections to Protestant services stressed the frontier nature of the city. They joined this with a needle threading in which they complained about the many Protestant assemblies in the region, but to ensure that this did not validate for the crown an impression that the Protestants might therefore need to be allocated a site of worship, they stressed that these services were not held in public.

==== Commissioners ====
The commissioners responsible for Dijon urged the Protestants of the city in July to behave with gentleness towards their Catholic neighbours and live in peace. The local authorities gave assurance that they had always shown obedience to the king and his officers, and that the Catholics were abiding by the king's edicts peaceably, the Protestants by contrast were violent and seditious.

In August, local officials challenged the crown's commissioners' attempt to allow the readmission and return of those who had been dispossessed 'for good reason'. Even if they could not defy this, they argued that the readmission of the Protestants into Dijon should represent the end of the commissioner's work.

==== Anti-Protestant regime ====
In October 1563, a Protestant couple of Dijon was arrested for having 'repeatedly and openly sung the psalm of David in public'. They were put before the mayoral court. Neighbours denounced them, noting they had tried to intervene to get them to stop. The husband protested that they could not be arrested on the grounds of their religion, and the psalm singing they were accused of was a 'libel'. Both would subsequently be jailed, with their appeal not heard until 4 November, which was denied. They would spend the next five years in prison, only being released in September 1568 after they had sworn to live as Catholics.

The seigneur de Tavannes had to step in to restrain the Catholics of Dijon on 1 January 1564. He ordered that they stop throwing sewage and stones at the houses of the Protestants still residing in the city who were living in accordance with the edict of Amboise.

In the first months of 1564, the Protestants of Dijon complained that the promises of protection they had received from the duc d'Aumale for the conduct of their worship had not materialised, and they were being victimised.

It would only be in January 1566 that a location for Protestant burials was granted. This was despite the fact a Protestant had been granted permission to bury his dead son according to his religion back in 1564.

In October 1566, the city council undertook legal action against a Protestant shoemaker who worked on the feast day of Saint-Crispin, the patron saint of shoemakers.

=== Beaune ===
In Beaune, the lieutenant of the bailliage court, Massol, expressed his confusion that armed men were still to be found in the town contrary to the edict of Amboise. It was explained to him that the seigneur de Tavannes had ordered their maintenance as it was a 'border town'.

By maintaining towns, such as Beaune (or Dijon) under arms, Tavannes was able to regulate the return of Protestants to their homes.

=== Mâcon ===
==== Return of the Protestants ====
On 8 June 1563, a crowd of three-hundred Protestants gathered beneath the walls of Mâcon, and their representative, a certain Philibert Barjot requested entry to the city. Barjot argued that the edict of Amboise had granted Protestants the right to return to their homes freely. The aldermen of Mâcon rebuffed his request, saying it was not their place to grant such a request, and that he should submit his demands in writing to the captain of the city, with a list of names of all those who wished to return. These names could be checked, to make sure no foreigners were trying to gain entry to their city. This was despite the fact the gatekeepers well knew the faces of their old neighbours. Thus, the gates were locked, and watch was taken from the city at the Protestants who congregated in a nearby meadow.

The aldermen of Mâcon appealed to the provincial royal commissioners, arguing that compliance with the terms of the edict of Amboise would risk an influx of foreigners into their city. Through raising the 'problem' of foreigners, the authorities of Mâcon placed in their own hands the ability to select who they wished to see return.

The Protestants were still in limbo at the start of July, the captain unwilling to make a decision without first consulting Tavannes. The lieutenant of the bailliage, named Chandon, looked to accelerate this drawn out process by freeing the prisoners and accepting the exiles return. Faced with this circumvention effort, the two captains of the city agreed to let those exiles who had proved to be less troublesome during the civil war return, based on a selection criteria outlined by Tavannes in mid-July.

==== Restricted existence ====
Protestant attempts to gain entry onto the city council were rebuffed out of hand.

In November 1563, the Protestants of Mâcon requested of Tavannes a place to bury their dead, and were granted that of Saint-Étienne, outside the city. The lieutenant-general established several riders to this grant though: they were never to gather there in groups of more than eight, that they conduct no preaching or hymns there, and that they conduct their burials at sunrise.

In April 1564, the provincial Estates of Burgundy argued to the king, as related to Mâcon, that the Protestants were not the majority community there.

There was concern in Mâcon that the route the Protestants took to attend their services involved passing through the city under arms.

=== Other places ===
The Catholics of Chalon-sur-Saône tried to argue for exemption from Protestant worship on the grounds that there were many other nearby suitable sites for Protestant worship, and that the assemblies might bring disorders to their community.

As late as February 1564, the Protestants of Châtillon-sur-Seine were still without the place of worship the edict had granted them. Those who attempted to attend services in places designated by the edict of Amboise for Protestant worship, were liable to be arrested.

At Cravant, near Auxerre, a Protestant service was attacked, with thirteen killed as a result. The commissioner Michel Quelain who had been operating in Languedoc and then the Lyonnais was entrusted with investigating the trouble in July 1564.

The Protestants of Autun objected to the site of La Tagnière chosen for their worship. They lamented in July 1563 that pastors and the preaching of scripture, and this was injurious to their consciences. The commissioners investigated their complaints as to its suitability and found them to be meritorious.

=== Nivernais ===
While most of the towns and cities on the Loire had been reconquered by the royalists during the First Civil War, that of La Charité-sur-Loire remained in Protestant hands.

== Lyonnais ==
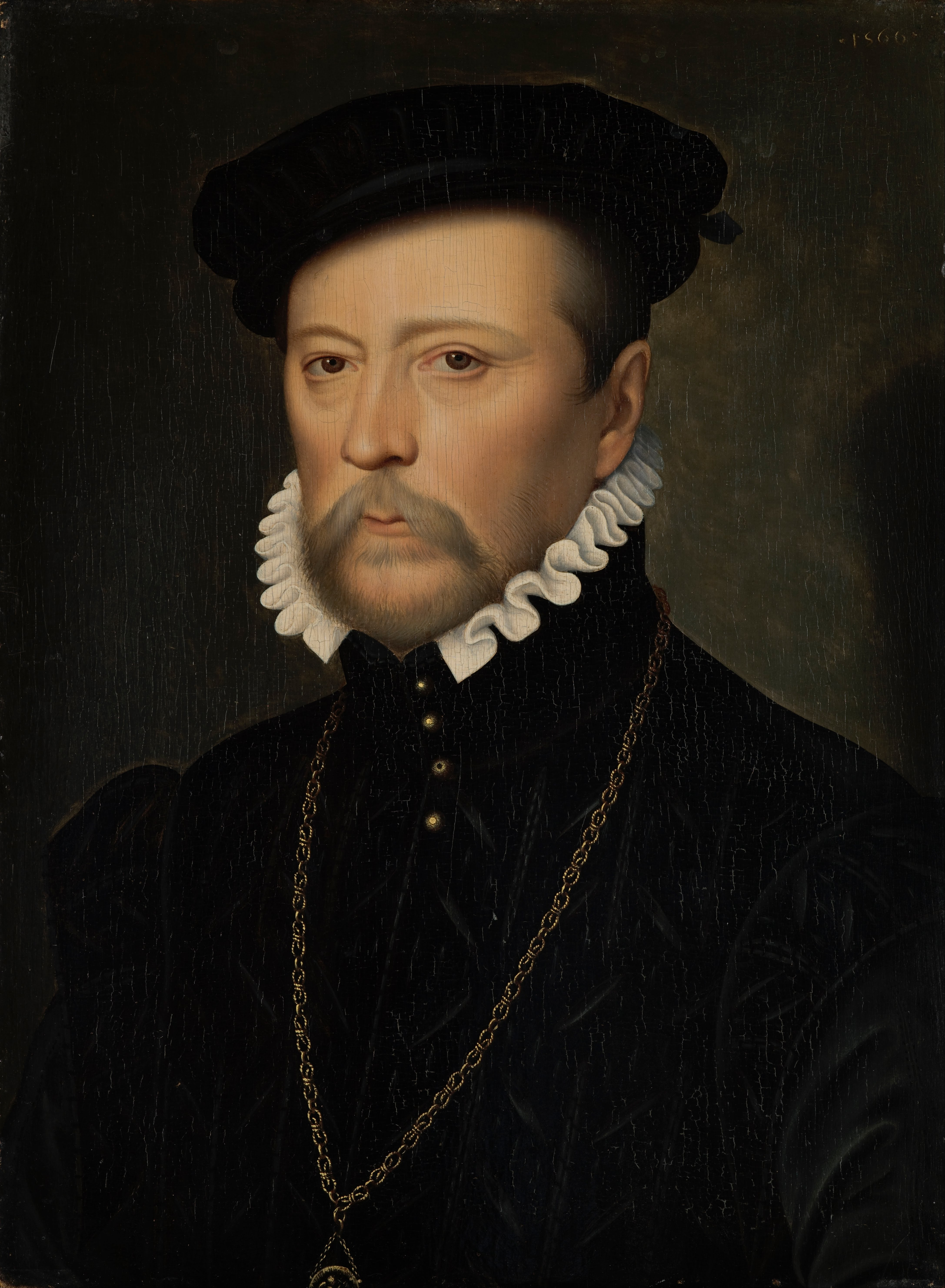
Maréchal de Vielleville, most prominent maréchal in the process of enforcement for the edict of Amboise

At the request of the duc de Nemours, the honour of induction into the Order of Saint-Michel was afforded to Nemours' lieutenant-general for the Lyonnais, the seigneur de Mandelot outside of the traditional period of promotion. Mandelot's loyalty was felt to be important to the security of Lyon.

The elevation of René de Birague as lieutenant-general of the government of the Lyonnais was a cause for scandal. Birague came from a relatively modest Italian background.

In the work Lettre missive d'un gentilhomme a un sien compagnon, contenant les causes de mescontentement de la Noblesse de France, the Protestant polemicist Gibier derided Birague, and another prominent Italian courtier, the comte de Retz as being of poor stock, with little in the way of martial accomplishments. It was despaired at that such unworthy men found favour over the nobility of France. Nobles of the Sword deserved these high offices by virtue of their generous and noble hearts. This same text observed that it was the ambition of these avaricious Italians to impose a tax on the incomes of the nobility. Another pamphleteer in 1567 bemoaned that Charles was 'governed by commoners'.

=== Lyon ===
The Protestants in charge of Lyon were hesitant to stand down with the coming of peace. They stalled registration of the edict of Amboise while they looked to acquire the preservation of the Protestant faith in Lyon, as well as political guarantees. Thus, for a time Catholicism was not re-established in the city. According to the Spanish ambassador's despatch of 7 June 1563, a party of Catholics came to the French court to complain of various infamies the Protestants of Lyon were responsible for, including the destruction of churches. They are to have received a dim reception from the crown.

At last, in summer the peace was accepted in the city. The maréchal de Vielleville had the sénéchaussée (mid-ranking court between that of the bailliage and parlement) of Lyon register the edict of Amboise on 11 June. Vielleville was afforded entry into Lyon on 15 June. As Protestantism was practiced there before the first war of religion, he assigned three places of worship for the Protestants of the city, though only two had been afforded by the edict of Amboise. By edict of 17 June, all inhabitants were ordered to hand over their arms before 1 July. A week later, on 24 June, the edict of Amboise was read out in public places along with the edict of 17 June.

==== Restoring bi-confessional government ====
As governor of Lyon, Vielleville imposed religious coexistence on the city. Protestants and Catholics were not to fight. Weapons had been confiscated from the populace, soldiers dismissed, Catholic churches reopened and their property restored to them. For their part, the Protestants were afforded permission to establish three new churches.

The Protestants of Lyon had at first hoped to maintain the city free of Catholicism, before conceding this and asking that they be allowed to maintain two mendicant temples in the city for their services. They were informed that the king intended all churches to be returned to the Catholics, and thus they searched for locations large enough to accommodate their numbers, finding three that were passed over to them despite the objections of Catholic religious houses.

Vielleville restored the fairs and privileges of Lyon in the hope of luring back merchants who had migrated from the city to Chalon. On 18 July, he restored the Mass to the cathedral of Saint-Jean, before departing for Provence.

There was also the matter of the return of the city's Catholic consuls. The Protestants had charged the Catholic consuls with having abandoned the city during the war, the Catholics meanwhile put little stock in the Protestant assurances, anticipating a new coup. Nevertheless, a bi-confessional consulate would be established at the instigation of the maréchal de Vielleville on 24 December 1563.

Vielleville brought together the masters of the guild that had been elected on 23 December 1563, and announced that Charles had ordered him assemble all those elected in 1561 and 1562. By this means, they could reduce their numbers down to their typical number. Six existing aldermen, and six new, equally divided between the faiths were then established. Christin contrasts this process with the modern conception of tolerance, arguing it derived more from secular political negotiation in the hopes of establishing a reasonable power sharing arrangement.

==== Commissioners ====
The commissioners responsible for the Lyonnais completed their overhaul of the city's judiciary by January 1564. This was followed up by new police regulations on 30 May 1564.

The commissioners who were responsible for Lyon, Michel Quelain and Gabriel Myron, received supplementary royal letters to augment their authority in April 1564, as the current arrangement was proving unworkable. Quelain's Catholicity had been challenged in the years 1562-3. Myron by contrast was unimpeachably Catholic. Despite this reputation, Myron showed a similar degree of commitment to securing site for Protestant worship, to the Protestant sympathetic Fumée in Bordeaux. They were granted the right to requisition ten royal judges from the présidial court to judge local cases. Roberts argues that Quelain and Myron were successful, given the difficulties of Lyon, noting they even found time to execute legal innovations during their stay in the city.

In April 1565, the royal commissioners for the pacification were again empowered by the French crown to resolve disputes in Lyon.

==== Catholic supremacy ====
The Catholics would come out of this deal the stronger of the two parties. They enjoyed powerful allies in the judiciary, as well as military strength after the construction of a fortress in the city. Parity would thus be fleeting. Come 1565, eight of the twelve consuls were Catholic. That same year, several prominent Protestant pastors, among whom was Viret, felt compelled to flee from Lyon in the face of the Catholic reaction in the city.

The Catholic consuls refused to recognise the debts their Protestant colleagues had accrued during the civil war. For the Catholics, the administration of the city in 1562 and 1563 was in itself illegitimate, thereby voiding the need to recognise their debts. One of those Protestant consuls who remained in office, Pierre Sève took umbrage with their refusal to recognise them in a session of 10 July 1565. He noted that it was not customary to do such a thing and would set a poor precedent that could in the future come back to hurt them. As the Catholics held the majority, they carried the day, and the debts were not recognised.

The death of two of the incumbent Catholic consuls, reduced the power of the Catholics in the council. The swearing in of the two replacements, appointed by the king, was boycotted by the Protestant members of the consulate, in the hopes of restoring parity in the city. By this means, quorum could not be attained by the Catholics on 17 July where they hoped to elect the new members. Only a few days later, on 19 July, the Protestant Sève sat with the Catholics, affording them the quorum necessary to conduct the election of the two new members. By this move, Sève rejected an absolute position, in favour of one that allowed his participation in government. Through this crossing of the aisle, the petrification of camps on the council might be eroded. The risks of this strategy were to be found in the criticism of the more resolute members of both parties.

==== End of Protestant administrative power ====
From 1565, the governor's council of Lyon, under the purview of the lieutenant-general Losses supervised the administration of Lyon and its surrounds. Unlike the municipal council, it was a religiously partisan body, and featured representatives of the présidial and sénéchaussée courts, alongside Catholic councillors.

Until 1566, the consulate of Lyon was divided between Protestants and Catholics. During that year the Protestant presence in the consulate was extinguished.

Lyon was to have its fortifications repaired. To this end, king Charles dispatched a certain captain Corset to the duc de Nemours to oversee work on the citadel during 1566.

In February 1567, the Protestant temple of Terreaux in Lyon was sacked. This was a response to the discovery of a mine which had been dug beneath the citadel of Lyon, something for which the Protestants were suspected.

== Dauphiné and French Piedmont ==
=== New administrations ===
Since 1562, the lieutenant-general of Dauphiné had been the stringent Catholic seigneur de Maugiron. Maugiron was also viewed as a strong loyalist of the Lorraine-Guise party. He was faced with a restless situation in Dauphiné, Catherine's letter to Maugiron of August 1563 testifying to continued troubles and disturbances.

In the hopes of providing a more moderate touch to the government of this province and reconciling the factions, Maugiron was replaced by the Montmorency client, the baron de Gordes, who would maintain the position until l578. Gordes was well known to Catherine, and had a reputation as a soldier and a diplomat of a well-regarded Provençal noble family that was well-established in Dauphiné. He possessed family links with leaders of the Protestant party. He replaced Maugiron in the charge while the court was staying in Valence between August and September 1564. To compensate Maugiron for this snub, he was elevated to the collar of the Order of Saint-Michel.

The prince de La Roche-sur-Yon, served as governor of Dauphiné until his death on 10 October 1565. He was succeeded in the charge by his elder brother, the duc de Montpensier. The duc de Montpensier in turn abdicated the office to his son, the prince dauphin d'Auvergne in the first months of 1567.

=== Commissioners ===
For Dauphiné, Jessé de Bauquemare and Jacques Phelippeaux would serve as royal commissioners for the peace edict. They complained that their expenses were not compensated and they had been forced to borrow money on interest in the course of their duties. Due to illnesses, Bauquemare and Phelippeaux were given responsibility over both Dauphiné and Provence.

=== Crisis of Gordes' authority ===
==== Early troubles ====
From the bailliage of Embrun, a firmly Catholic town, it was imparted to Gordes in November 1564 that they were having difficulties with the valley of Freyssinières, which showed 'little respect for god, the king, or royal justice'.

In December 1564, the sieur de Furmeyer, a leader of the Protestant party during the first civil war, was assassinated. The murder gave the appearances of Catholic revenge. The parlementaires who travelled to the scene were met with a wall of silence. The attempt of the vi-bailli (vice-bailiff) Meyrieu to arrest ten of the guiltiest persons inspired an attempt to spring them from captivity.

In Oisans, the judge alerted the baron de Gordes in January 1565 that he had suppressed seditions in the place of La Mure, before moving on to Lans-en-Vercors where he summoned notable Catholics and Protestants before him. The Catholics reported on a Protestant assembly, and the Protestants petitioned for redress against acts committed against them during this assembly by the Catholics.

Attempts to clamp down on illicit Protestant worship in the Diois, Trièves, Champsaur and other places were frustrated. At Vif, the bailli sought information about a Protestant colloquy that had transpired at Mens-en-Trièves during December, but his efforts came to nought as almost the entire village was Protestant and refused to speak with him on the matter. The royal sergeants demand of the Protestant minister of Vif to cease worship in the place was rebuffed, the pastor claiming the authority of god superseded that of man.

==== Officially lieutenant-general ====
Gordes would have to wait for the registration of his letters of commission by the parlement of Grenoble, on account of the plague that was ravaging the city. It was only with his ceremonial entry of 12 February 1565 into Grenoble that he would be affirmed in his office. Gordes looked to a certain lawyer of Grenoble, Laurent de Briançon to act as his factotum. Briançon would subsequently defend the baron de Gordes against criticism of his government at Moulins.

Justice under Gordes was divided into two sections. The first, the judges and clerks of the four bailliages and sénéchaussées, who were subordinate to the parlement of Grenoble. The second, the baillis and vi-baillis who formed the armed parts of justice. Together they enjoyed responsibility for enforcing the edict of Amboise, and its subsequent modificatory declarations. Gordes had little faith in this system at a time when great care was required to maintain tranquillity. Further, the plague compromised the ability of the officers to conduct their patrols.

During February, Gordes invited the baron des Adrets to join him in Laval, near Grenoble. While this reassured the Protestants of Dauphiné, it was to the alarm of the Catholics, to whom Adrets had been a terror during the civil war.

Around Easter 1565, two churches were torched near Pont-en-Royans (a place which had been afforded to the Protestants). The guilty fled, and the Protestant pastor of Grenoble, knowing that his coreligionists would be suspected of the crime, promised to work with any judicial inquiry. Two days earlier a Catholic delegation led by the seigneur de Pont-au-Royan with several parlementaires had gone to the président (senior judge of the parlement) de Portes.

==== Crisis ====
Opposition to the baron de Gordes was growing, and he was advised by the comte de Crussol, who was at court, to ensure he did his all to appear Catholic, as he had enemies among the Catholic party at court.

Around Pentecost (10 June), the baron de Gordes, to the vexation of the Catholics, failed to impede a Protestant synod from transpiring at Grenoble. The rumours had it that thousands of Protestants, including those from plague infected areas, would be in attendance, with the former (now Protestant) bishop of Aix appearing at the head of an armed band. Though the reality was far diminished on this, and the festivities were celebrated peaceably, it was taken as a sign of the baron de Gordes' weakness by the Catholics.

A few weeks later, during a procession to cleanse the city from its impurities (both the plague and implicitly, Protestantism), Gordes was anonymously alerted to threats against his life.

Attempting to disarm the population of Dauphiné, the baron de Gordes uncovered a cache of arms belonging to a former supplier of the prince de Condé, and came into conflict with the Catholic nobility of Grésivaudan who refused to yield their arms.

Around the end of June, new rumours were spread of a Protestant attempt to seize the border Savoyard fortress of Montmélian. It was alleged that Geneva (the central base of Calvinism) was sponsoring 'plague spreaders' in alliance with Dauphinois Protestants to seize the city. The Savoyards were convinced of the threat posed by these non-existent 'spreaders'. For the Dauphinois Catholics, this conspiracy was knitted into a network of Protestant action including an attempt to seize Lyon, and massacres in Orléans and Tours. All the while, their supposed lieutenant-general was complicit with the Protestant nobility. Meanwhile, Gordes departed for a tour of the eastern fortifications, as well as a rendezvous with the duke of Savoy in August leaving the field open to his enemies. The premier président (first president - most senior judge) of the parlement of Grenoble, Truchon, kept the baron de Gordes appraised of developments.

==== Catholic strike ====
The parlement was not then in session, it being the summer, and therefore the remonstrances was presented before the smaller vacation chamber. This transpired on 17 August, shortly after the feast of the assumption (15 August), with the involvement of the procureur général Pierre Bûcher and Pierre Le Maistre, the first consul of Grenoble in 1564. Le Maistre had claimed a group of Protestants insulted him on the day of the feast of the assumption, a claim which survived judicial review. The two men complained that the Protestants privately met in two places on that same feast day. The vacation chamber thus implored the baron de Gordes to return. The next day, new Catholic rumours originating from 'gentleman of distinction' alleged mounted pistoleers marching from Voreppe to Grenoble. Catholic craftsmen were also said to be selling arquebuses, and the Protestants were beginning to fear a Sicilian Vespers massacre after an overheard remark from one such craftsman.

==== Petition against Gordes ====
Gordes was back in Grenoble by the start of September. On 18 September, inspired by the Catholics of Lyon requesting of the crown for their city to be exempted from Protestant worship, the Catholics of Grenoble formulated their own petition. While the petition itself does not survive, responses to it do. Gordes saw the procureur général, alongside the avocat Le Maistre and the sieur de Pâquier as the architects of the enterprise. Similarly, men that Gordes took to be involved in the murder of Furmeyer such as the sieur de Glandage (governor of Die) who had supposedly provided refuge in his château to the chevalier de Bona, a suspect on Furmeyer's murder; and the sieur de Maugarny who had killed a Protestant gentlemen on the road a few months after the declaration of peace.

The historians Greengrass and Rentet argue that Gordes' challenges to these men's credibility were weak. Attacking Pâquier directly was not easy for Gordes, as they were tied together by marriage.

Moving on to matters of substance, Gordes noted how both he and the parlement did not pointlessly bother the king, in the way the petitioners had. Further, the petition messed with the chronology to slander him, absenting itself from the usage of dates to hide the fact most of what they brought up happened before his appointment. They gave credence to all the rumours they heard, in the hope of disturbing the public peace. He further alleged that his accusers made him guilty for things that were outside his jurisdiction as lieutenant-general, for ecclesiastical matters were not his concern, nor the ordinary process of justice. Rather than a partisan in favour of the Protestants, the baron was a faithful adherent of the edict of pacification.

When, on 10 October 1565, the prince de La Roche-sur-Yon, governor of Dauphiné, died. He was succeeded in the office of governor of Dauphiné by his brother, the duc de Montpensier. This was an opportune moment therefore for the enemies of the baron de Gordes to have their petition arrive at the French court.

The culmination of the challenge to Gordes' authority was tackled by the court during its stay in Moulins in the first months of 1566. From Dauphiné, Gordes kept appraised of developments by letter of his allies who had come to join with the court. Gordes' agent Briançon worked ably in his service. He struck up a friendship with an agent of the duc de Montpensier's, requested that Gordes make a gift of mules to buy loyalty, and held secret meetings with the Protestant admiral de Coligny and cardinal de Châtillon. He was reassured by an audience he enjoyed with Catherine on 20 January in which he got to expound upon Gordes' situation. Four days later he requested that the baron de Gordes write an obsequious letter to the queen mother.

Gordes was to make it clear that in everything he relied on her, and that he feared being left in a situation similar to that which befell La Motte-Gondrin (the lieutenant-general of Dauphiné up to his murder in 1562) for want of men. Briançon also spoke with the chancellor who was entirely in Gordes' corner already and advised him to just summarise the points of Gordes' memorandum, rather than presenting the full thing. Catherine tried to stop the affair from coming before the king's council, but Briançon insisted it was necessary for his master's honour, and it was heard on 8 February. The three-hour session proved a poor result for Gordes' enemies. They were made to look ridiculous, and Gordes would subsequently enjoy a richer royal correspondence.

=== Grenoble ===
==== End of Protestant dominion ====
In August 1563, the commissioners for Dauphiné extolled the people of Grenoble to forget their past grievances and respect the peace edict. It would not be until December 1563, that Catholicism returned to the city, which had been in Protestant hands during the war. Despite the Protestant occupation, the city remained of a strongly Catholic character. Over the coming months and years, the Protestants lost their positions in the municipal bodies of Grenoble.

The Protestants negotiated with the local authorities as they vacated the churches they had occupied. They sought municipal funding for their new site. They were prevented from assuming control of the refectory of the cordeliers and were ultimately granted the right to build a temple, pick a burial site, and until such time as one could be established, the clergy would permit them to use the regular cemeteries.

==== Electoral dispute ====
By the end of 1566, when the council made its proposals for candidates of the 1567 consul, there were no Protestants chosen for the election. This aroused Protestant indignation, with arguments that they had a right to be represented. The matter went before the parlement of Grenoble, which determined, in an 18 December judgement, that the Protestants did indeed have this right, and the council should select eight Protestant men from which four would be chosen. The council chose men who were not of the appropriate rank to becoming first consul, leading to further Protestant protest. Thus, Hugues Vallambert, a man of suitable dignity, was nominated. Though they had twice had their protests successfully abided by, no Protestants would be elected consul for 1567.

=== Die ===
The town of Die was to be found firmly in the Protestant camp. The Catholic clergy were thus uneasy about the prospect of resuming the practice of their faith in the city. In November 1563, the prospect of death threats made some priests hesitant to say Mass, to the vexation of their flock. This was despite the encouragement of the council.

It would be the majority Protestant consulate of Die that had to offer guarantees of protection to the Catholics into the summer of 1564. Threats were made by the Protestant controlled council to punish those Protestants who tried to confound the Catholic clergy.

=== Montélimar ===
The city of Montélimar had a tradition of consuls and councillors choosing their successors. This system (which locked in Protestant hegemony) began to deteriorate around 1564. The first consul, a certain Chapuys, chastised those who sought to sow discord and undermine the election process. He rebuffed the demands of the Catholic opposition on the council on the grounds of civic liberties (i.e. tradition), but nevertheless there was agreement that it would be prudent to convene a general council of the most prominent men of Montélimar to get their opinion on the matter. At the general council, Chapuys again denounced those who sought to undermine the traditional electoral process of Montélimar by threatening parallel elections. The historian Christin accepts Chapuy's argument as being on firm legal footing, but finds it to be politically weak, the electoral process of nominated successors was a poor mix with the stated effort to reintegrate Catholics into the community of Montélimar. Therefore, it soon became apparent the Protestants would have to share power in the city.

Through the intervention of a certain Bressieu, a second general council was held on 14 January 1564. After a difficult vote, it was agreed to appoint two Catholic men of standing as deputies of the council. This was not satisfactory to the Catholics, who also wished to have a voice in the consulate. The two royal commissioners, La Magdeleine and Bauquemart would arrive to oversee the establishment of a bi-confessional consulate in mid-February. By this means, Catholics were restored to involvement in political decision making. Faced with institutional deadlock, the Protestant consuls of Montélimar would go on to resign en masse later that year.

=== Valence ===
The city of Valence would send representatives out to meet with the maréchal de Vielleville in June 1563. These delegates declared their obedience and their commitment to the pacification. In the coming months, declarations of the unity of the people, and their commitment to the king's edicts were made.

The Protestants of Valence, like those of Grenoble, would make use of hospitals as a temporary location for worship, despite the clerical ownership of these buildings.

Valence would bear witness in 1564 to conflict between the commissioners and the municipality. The municipality complained that the commissioners were encroaching on their civic liberties as regarded the imposition of taxation. Protest on board, the measure of the commissioners was modified.

The Protestants of Valence would not be permitted to ring church bells, in compliance with the edict of Amboise. Thus, the bell in their possession had its clapper removed. Suspicion was thus later raised when a Protestant was appointed to regulate the clocks of the city.

A synod was held in Valence by armed Protestants.

=== Nyons ===
In Nyons, on 30 April 1563, the general assembly of the town (at the urging of the Protestant pastor) promised the leaders of the two local confessional armies, the seigneur de Montbrun for the Protestants and Saint-Jalle for the Catholics, that they would live in peace and bi-confessional concord. Having received a summons from the marquis de Bressieu, a Protestant and Catholic were sent to the notable in the interest of balance.

In December, the town again attested this liberal attitude before the Estates of Dauphiné. In January 1564, one of the consuls, a certain François Bon, read before the council a directive from Bressieu which mandated parity in the consulate and among the councillors, and the re-establishment of the Catholic faith in Nyons. Bon noted that the Protestants had no desire to impede Catholic worship and indeed had invited the Catholic priests to perform their rites. The directions for consular parity would be followed also with one consul a Catholic, the other a Protestant. This process would be followed scrupulously.

In January 1565, the Protestant Roy, and the Catholic Marcel, gathered the council for the election of the next years deputies. Each man designated six of their faith, and the one who received the plurality of votes among this group received the nomination as consul.

The fruits of this approach were seen in 1565, by the lack of bearing arms, or the troubling of the cities Catholic population. The bi-confessional system of parity would function without trouble in Nyons until 1568.

=== Vienne ===
In Vienne, the Protestants had been ousted from the city consulate in late 1562, shortly after the battle of Dreux. With the coming of peace, they wished to reverse this coup. Appeals were made to the maréchal de Vielleville that their ouster had been contrary to the edict of Amboise. The new Catholic consulate threatened a mass resignation to counteract any efforts of their removal. Their firm position would require moderation, and in the Autumn, Vielleville ordered that when the next consular election was taken, two of the four places be reserved for Protestants. This measure eased tensions, cooling passions among certain segments of the Protestant population.

This would not have the effect of guaranteeing a Protestant voice in Vienne. From 1565, the slate of elected consuls was Catholic. It was further rejected by majority vote to institute a bi-confessional elected body of mediators, much to the chagrin of the Protestants.

Christin notes the contrasting possibilities of majoritarian government in this period of peace. On the one hand, it allowed the majority to sweep away the representation and voices of the minority in such a way as to compromise the meaning of the peace. On the other hand, there were circumstances where it allowed Protestants and Catholics to move beyond their confessional affiliations, as with Catholics in Vienne that voted for Protestant candidates. Le Roux highlights that shared religious control of the municipal consulates often allowed Catholics to maintain a foothold in places that had been conquered by the Protestants during the first civil war.

=== Romans ===
The comte de Crussol informed the town of Romans of the peace by letter of 12 April, requesting that the consuls of the place make for Valence on 20 April to learn the royal will at the provincial estates. The historian Nicoll does not believe the estates went ahead.

Though they had just observed the re-establishment of Catholicism in Grenoble, the Protestant consuls of Romans waited for the commissioners to arrive in their city before re-establishing the Mass.

In Romans, the commissioners for the province established a new bi-confessional body of thirty members sometime before the end of October 1563. This body would daily deal with matters relating to religious coexistence.

Romans would follow a different course to some other bi-confessional cities. At least according to a contemporary Catholic chronicler, it was the Protestants that ruled the supposed bi-confessional urban government. This chronicler noted a Catholic petition of April 1564, requesting that the two parties be made equal.

=== Other places ===
The diocese of Vaison in Dauphiné was one of great Protestant strength. However, even here, the Catholics held the town of Mirabel.

A Catholic priest in Gap oversaw the pillaging and mistreatment of Protestants.

=== French Piedmont ===
In the French Italian territory of Saluzzo, the Protestants of this place made requests to receive preachers.

== Comtat Venaissin, Orange, and Avignon ==
=== Continued fighting ===
At the moment of the edict of Amboise being made known to the Comtat Venaissin (the Papal exclave in southern France) on 27 April, half the province was under the control of the Protestants.

The publication of the edict of Amboise did not end the violence in these territories. Protestants, who had succeeded in occupying much of the Papal land during the civil war, continued to conduct raids. Séguret was attacked, with one-hundred-and-thirty left dead, the Catholic priest of Morières was killed, and incursions were made into Gigondas, Sablet and Bédoin. Cattle raids, attacks on the peasantry and the looting of crops were the order of the day. In addition to the human toll of the violence, the economy was also affected, with rent incomes down significantly against their level in 1560.

On 31 May, the comte de Crussol, commander of the southern rebel Protestants during the civil war, made a declaration concerning the Protestant troops in the Comtat Venaissin. He defended his previous fighting in the territory as being in service of the king, against seditious persons, with the goal of protecting his subjects from foreign troops. Having now been informed of the king's will on the matter, Crussol ordered his captains to cease operations there, and withdrew the artillery. The Provençal troops in the territory were not under his command. Going forward he assured that he would have no involvement in Comtat Venaissin affairs.

Rather than hand back the Protestant held towns in the Comtat Venaissin, Crussol thus absolved himself of responsibility. He avoided seriously upsetting the Protestants or the crown by this abdication of involvement. The Provençal soldiers reached out to Crussol asking that he supply them, so that they needn't be compelled to live off the land. Crussol denied their request, and thus the Provençal soldiers continued to live off the Papal territory until such time they could return to Provence.

It would not be until the end of August that the Provençal Protestant soldiers were able to leave the Papal territories. The peace edict would then be published in the Comtat Venaissin in September.

=== Restoration of Papal authority ===
For the Papacy, the desirable outcome of the peace was for all the Protestant occupations to be cleared from the Comtat Venaissin. Beyond this, for Protestant worship to be prohibited across the land.

The Estates of the Comtat convened in Avignon. They concluded that it would be necessary to negotiate with the Protestant leaders. However, the Protestants gathered their own Estates, at Sainte-Cécile-les-Vignes and asserted the right to determine law and taxation for the entire territory.

The arrival of the maréchal de Vielleville in the area, to enforce the terms of the peace, did not bring about a happy conclusion to the affair. He struggled to make an impression on the Protestants in the Comtat and Orange. By August, he had succeeded in convincing some to cross the Durance river and head south. Others however, remained in their places, and continued to terrorise the Papal territories.

In September, it appeared as though a deal had been reached. The Protestants would accept the banning of their religion in the Papal territories, and in return, the Papacy afforded them freedom of conscience in Papal lands. The Protestants pulled out of this deal at the last minute, much to the vexation of the maréchal de Vielleville.

The Protestant position was now weaker though, having come to the table to talk terms, they had laid down their arms. The Papal commander Serbelloni (cousin of pope Pius IV) recaptured Mormoiron in September, and its fall saw three surrounding villages likewise capitulate. The fall of Le Barroux opened up the north of the Comtat Venaissin, while Malaucène and Caderousse came soon after into Papal hands. Shortly after these triumphs, much of the rest of the territory was restored to Papal control. Formal peace would not be made in the Comtat until Charles' grand tour of the kingdom arrived in Avignon a year later.

For Venard, 1564 represented the death knell of the Protestant movement in the Comtat. Going forward, Protestant groundwork in the Papal territories would be eliminated. This made Avignon a Catholic island in a sea of Protestantism. With Protestant strength to be found in the nearby Principality of Orange, the Dauphiné diocese of Vaison (to the north-east of the Comtat), to the east around Mérindol, and to the west beyond the Rhône.

Hold outs for Protestantism in the province of Avignon were to be found in the above-mentioned Mérindol, and Le Buis. Through the intervention of the baron de Gordes, and the président of the parlement of Grenoble, Catholicism was restored to the latter place in 1564.

=== Illegal Protestantism ===
While Protestantism was now illegal in Avignon, this did not bring about the envisioned Catholic purity. The Protestants of Avignon would travel to Villeneuve-lès-Avignon and other places to meet with their Protestant relatives. Similarly, Protestants were hired to be workers and servants. When this practice was ordered to come to an end, a certain Possevino reported that the exodus of Protestant workers numbered around five hundred.

Receiving reports from his agents about the level of Protestantism still in Avignon, the pope wrote to the cardinal d'Armagnac that he was of the understanding there were thirty crypto-Protestants in the city. The inquiry that followed did not turn up any such crypto-Protestants. Despite this, Pius V would remain convinced that Protestants were present in Avignon.

The cardinal d'Armagnac's governing of the Papal territory came in for challenge in Rome during 1566. He was charged with poor administration and neglecting religious matters. These charges were challenged by a certain Garganello, who wrote back to cardinal Farnese to argue that Armagnac's administration was one that conducted 'good and holy works'.

Armagnac for his part wrote disapprovingly to Charles in June 1566 to note that French subjects were assembling at Saint-Pol and Tulette in Dauphiné, Mondragon in Provence, and Orange under the command of a captain Saint-Auban. He described an incident where they had slain a burgher and threatened towns. With horsemen they had overrun the Papal lands. Armagnac requested that forces be provided so that the interlopers might be dealt with.

Between 1566 and 1574, the notary Vincent Siffredi reported that around seven-hundred heretics were sentenced to death by the Papal Tribunal, though many of these heretics were not to be found in the Papal territories, and thus the justice was limited to the seizure of their property.

=== Orange ===
The prince of Orange wrote the articles of peace that were to apply to his principality, which was nestled near to Avignon. Both religions were to be tolerated, those who had fled during the war were invited to return, and the Protestants could keep the church of the Jacobins but would have to return the others they had taken to the Catholics. This would mean, in Courthézon, Jonquières and Gigondas finding a place other than a church in which to worship. This settlement was unacceptable to the Papacy, which dispatched an envoy to the Spanish court to alert the Papal Nuncio, who would in turn request that king Philip II pressure the prince of Orange (who was a Spanish vassal for his Dutch territories) to ban the practice of Protestantism in his territory. Conversely, resistance from the Protestants meant that Catholic worship was not re-established in the principality until 1565. Mass was first celebrated again in the city of Orange around Easter 1565. In 1566, the bishop returned to assume control of the Cathedral of Orange.

In Courthézon the notaries had removed Catholic invocations from their will formulae, even in circumstances where their clients were Catholic. This did not stop their clients from requesting traditional Catholic burials. By 1565, the Protestant community of Courthézon had developed a monetary system for the upkeep of their church. Two years later, in 1567, the Catholics of Courthézon were beginning to mobilise. This was seen in the formation of a confraternity. However, Venard notes that, due to their close contact with their Protestant neighbours, the articles of the confraternity were unusually influenced by Protestant evangelical language.

Even in areas of Protestant domination like Orange, there were to be found holdout places of Catholic strength, such as the town of Jonquières.

== Provence ==
Violence did not cease in Provence with the coming of peace, and the baron de Biron was sent into the province at the head of an army late in 1563 to handle the continued fighting. He reduced the Protestant garrison of Sisteron.

In Provence, the maréchal de Vielleville oversaw the re-establishment of the comte de Tende in his charge of provincial governor, and that those Protestants who had fled Provence after the fall of Sisteron during the first war of religion might return to their homes.

In mid-1564, he made recommendation that the comte de Sommerive and comte de Carcès be summoned to court. They were accused of obstructing the implementation of the edict of Amboise.

At the provincial estates of Provence in March 1564, held at Manosque, the Catholic nobility refused to attend.

The comte de Tende, governor of Provence, died on 6 April 1566, and was succeeded to the charge by his son.

=== Commissioners ===
It was only in the spring of 1564 that Jacques Phelippeaux and Jessé de Bauquemare arrived as the crown's commissioners for the enforcement of the edict of Amboise. Their arrival had been held up by their involvement in the peace process of Dauphiné.

=== Sites of worship ===
Provision of sites of worship to Protestants was poor, and therefore the Protestants of Provence relied on the concessions for noble Protestant worship for their access to their religion.

In December 1563, the crown inquired of the governor of Provence as to the establishment of sites of Protestant worship as per the edict of Amboise. This caused confusion in Provence as, outside of noble houses, the province had been exempted from the designation of such sites. Despite this, the Protestants would eventually secure the site of Mérindol for their worship in Provence.

Though worship was confined largely to noble estates, the Protestants of Provence were to be provided suitable sites for the burial of their dead.

=== Catholic Leagues ===
During 1567 in Provence, penitential brotherhoods proliferated. This included the penitents of Sainte-Claire de Cassis, which was headed by the local bailli (bailiff). The bishop of Marseille authorised the creation of two new penitential brotherhoods in the same year. The purpose of these brotherhoods was to clear the diocese of Protestants, including those to be found in the outlying villages where the new faith still enjoyed some strength.

=== Aix ===
Vielleville fruitlessly attempted to see the parlement of Aix register the edict of Amboise on 28 July. He then briefly visited Marseille before returning to Aix on 30 July in the hopes of securing support for the peace from a group of the local nobility.

The local nobility of Aix would reaffirm their opposition to the peace on 5 August. Nevertheless, progress would be made by 8 August with an agreement allowing Protestants to return to their homes with disarmament. The ban on their worship would also be lifted.

Back in Aix on 15 September after a tour of Dauphiné, Vielleville undertook more talks to see the edict of Amboise registered. This was finally accomplished on 15 September.

Bernard Prévost, who exercised the senior judicial office in Aix, expressed the difficulty he found in keeping the peace. By October 1566, Prévost was able to content himself that good progress had been made for the return of private property, and judicial judgements contrary to the edict of Amboise.

=== Marseille ===
Marseille proved obstinate concerning the peace, arguing that their municipal privileges allowed them to defy it. The maréchal de Biron increasingly lost his patience, observing that if kind words and remonstrations achieved nothing, he had a large force from Charles in the area he could employ. Ultimately, Marseille would win exemption from Protestant worship.

=== Other places ===
Churches were burned in the province of Provence in 1565 in the regions of Grésivaudan and Gapançais.

== Languedoc and Roussillon ==
=== Delayed coming of peace ===
Despite the establishment of the edict of Amboise, bringing the first French War of Religion to a close, fighting did not immediately cease. The Protestants of Castres and Puylaurens, hoping to relieve the siege on the capital of Quercy (Cahors), seized the town of Buzet north of Toulouse on 2 April.

The vicomte de Joyeuse, lieutenant-general of Languedoc, complained that he had been unable to see the edict of Amboise published in towns that the Protestants had dominated for the last year. There, he found his own authority could not match those of the Protestants.

==== Bagnols ====
It was while a Protestant council was assembled at Bagnols-sur-Cèze (a meeting which began on 31 March and ended on 5 April) that they became aware of the signing of the edict of Amboise. The comte de Crussol, leader of the southern Protestant rebels, had received an unsigned copy of the peace from the national Protestant leader, the prince de Condé, and it was thus not immediately apparent to those at the assembly that terms had been agreed. Given the uncertainty, the comte de Crussol was maintained in his leadership role until such time as the troubles were completely pacified. So too was the confederation of Protestant aligned towns in Languedoc, Dauphiné and the Lyonnais under Crussol's leadership. They were to remain united in alliance.

The provided terms from Condé were not directly criticised but it was determined to hold off the laying down of arms until the king was felt to be at liberty, free of the control of the enemies of the Protestants. This had not yet transpired in their estimation. The Catholic-royalist army must also be dissolved and the government of the province of Languedoc and the administrators of justice granted to Protestants. With all these conditions met, disarmament could transpire.

Thus, Daussy sees little trust in the terms of the edict by the Protestants of Languedoc in a scenario where they continued to have a Catholic governor (there present governor being the Catholic constable de Montmorency). Matters of finance were also discussed for the current campaigns the Protestants were undertaking. A force needed by sent into Dauphiné to relieve the siege of Grenoble, and Crussol had sought the raising of new companies to face off enemies on the frontiers of Languedoc.

Efforts to improve the Protestant justice system were also proposed, as crimes such as the attendance of Mass needed to be effectively punished, and delinquent soldiers disciplined.

To express their frustrations to the crown, the assembly of Bagnols nominated three men (the seigneur de Clausonne, de Colans and a Palamides) to go to the court and outline their reservations. They would not however immediately depart. At court, they would remonstrate with the king and the conseil privé (privy council) not only concerning the peace, but also other issues. In this remonstrance, the Protestants requested the dispatch of commissioners into the provinces to ensure the enforcement of the edict of Amboise, in addition to a host of other concerns and requests on the terms of the edict and freedom of worship. The seigneur de Colans was to gain amnesty for acts undertaken by the Protestant Estates of Languedoc during the war. Representatives were also sent to the cardinal de Châtillon to thank him for his services to the provinces.

There is no account of the reception the Languedocien Protestants enjoyed at court, however the response of the conseil privé to the grievances Clausonne presented does survive from 17 October. It was written in the margins of the text the Protestants had submitted and contained no major concessions. Daussy separates out the establishment of the commissioner system that the crown would undertake from this request, noting that the royal system did not follow from the Languedocien petition. The seigneur de Colans' efforts would be successful, and Charles signed an amnesty for the Languedocien Protestants on 11 December.

==== Protestant estates of Montpellier ====
A few weeks later, the Protestant controlled Estates of Languedoc met at Montpellier, having been convened by the comte de Crussol in the hopes of seeing the edict of Amboise adopted. One of the chief purposes of the meeting was for the Protestant nobility (that was far more sympathetic to the edict of Amboise) to convince their Languedocien coreligionists who were more suspicious of the peace to lay down their arms. The comte de Crussol and the cardinal de Châtillon arrived in Montpellier for the occasion. So too did Condé's representative, François de Boucard. These grandees were welcomed with much ceremony in Montpellier. Four companies of infantry with their battle ensigns awaited them, crowds of children singing the psalms of David. As the men approached the town they were greeted with the firing off of artillery. Gifts were granted to Crussol and Châtillon.

Two days after their arrival, the comte de Caylus made a more subtle entry into the city. He had been given the mission by the crown of seeing the edict of Amboise registered by the parlement (highest court of appeal in ancien régime France, there were eight in the kingdom during this period) of Toulouse and seeing to the Protestant disarmament. He had begun his mission in Languedoc in April.

The Montpellier assembly opened on 11 May, with Boucard calling for the gathered to abide by the edict and show their obedience to the crown. Caylus followed on from what Boucard said in his speech of the next session. Caylus noted that he had already published the edict in Narbonne, Castelnaudary, Toulouse and Carcassonne. He explained that Charles and Catherine were grateful the good service the comte de Crussol and the Protestants of the region had done over the past year, knowing them to be good and loyal subjects. The seigneur de Clausonne thanked Caylus on behalf of the assembly, expressing pleasure in the attitude of the king, and noting the desire to live in peace. To Boucard, he offered thanks for his service but expressed disapproval at some of the terms of the edict.

Faced with this bi-confessional onslaught, the deputies relented, and on 13 May agreed to register the edict. It was not an unconditional registration though, as they sought the dismissal of the lieutenant-general of Languedoc, Joyeuse, a new governor (preferably a prince du sang - prince of the blood, descended from the French royal family through the male line) and that the royalist-Catholics also lay down their arms.

It was intended to remonstrance with the king on the points of the edict that were felt to be unjust before they began to strictly adhere to them. Plans were also made for the future, with the selection of representatives for a Protestant synod of August. The comte de Crussol, who had so well served the Protestant cause, was to be afforded a guard of gentleman for the security of his person when he travelled to court. Ten gentlemen would receive 1,000 livres over the coming months to serve as this guard. Crussol would also maintain the powers the Protestants had established him in still longer, until the peace was 'firmly established'. An escort was also provided for the unimpeachable admiral de Coligny (alongside a grant of 4,000 livres to employ this guard of twenty gentlemen for four months). No grants were made to the prince de Condé, who was felt to have sold them out by the peace, which gave far too much to the crown.

After their collaboration at the Montpellier Protestant estates, the comte de Crussol and seigneur de Caylus headed for Béziers, where they oversaw the publication of the peace.

Despite the endorsement of the edict by the Montpellier Protestant estates, the entire Protestant economic-military system that had been established in the south was not dismantled. A certain Guillaume Arquier received appointment for the collection of funds. The vicomte de Joyeuse would charge the Protestants with having raised the taille on the king's subjects at their Montpellier estates. Crussol would subsequently deny this, but Nicoll finds his defence weak, noting that the Protestants continued to collect rents on seized ecclesiastical lands. Crussol's political system was also to be kept in operation until such time as the edict of Amboise was effectively implemented in Languedoc. Receiving their request, Crussol assented to maintain his operations for some months longer. As an economy, his governing council would be reduced to five members. This system would however quickly fade from the record. Daussy credits this to Catherine's successful intervention with the comte de Crussol. Though their parallel political and economic institutions faded away, they would once more be awoken at the outbreak of the second French War of Religion.

Clausonne presented the doléances of the Protestants of Languedoc to the king and these were addressed in royal council of October 1563. The assumption by the crown of Protestant debts accrued in Languedoc during the war would be a laboured process. For example, a certain Jehan Pons found himself asking for reimbursement in 1565. The auditors demanded that Pons prove that the sieur de Pérault, who governed Montpellier for the Protestants in the war, did so on the comte de Crussol's orders. Pons presented witness statements proving Pérault's presence in Montpellier, as well as extracts of his accounts. Crussol would subsequently affirm Pérault's commission in January 1567, and a copy of his 1563 letter establishing Pérault in the office was provided. At last, in February 1567, Charles ordered the auditors to reimbursed Pons. Another figure, Lion Malbois, had his accounts at first thrown out, and it was not until 1566 that he was compensated when royal order commanded the auditors to pay the comte de Crussol's one-time subordinates.

==== Change of the guard ====
Joyeuse was not removed from the office of lieutenant-general of Languedoc. Further, the replacement for the constable de Montmorency as governor of Languedoc proved to be his son, the seigneur de Damville.

Writing to Charles a few weeks after the Montpellier Estates, Joyeuse complained that the Protestants refused to return the towns they held to him. He dismissed the validity of the Protestant held Estates, noting that they had not been convened on the king's orders. Joyeuse explained how Charles had previously ordered him to disband his forces and disarm, but this was impossible in a situation where Crussol was not disarming. Thus, for the sake of the population of Languedoc, he had maintained some troops at arms.

The crown advised Joyeuse (and his Dauphinois counterpart Maugiron, to let the Protestants take the first step and then mirror the action, so that the Protestants did not seize new places. Tievant describes how Languedoc remained divided into two opposing camps until the arrival of Vielleville in July. Finally, Crussol stood down before the authority of Vielleville and the comte de Caylus.

Caylus would enter many of the former Protestant strongholds: Montpellier on 12 August 1563, then Castres on 13 September and finally Puylaurens. In these places he endeavoured to see to the progress of disarmament. The choice of Caylus for this role avoided the problem of picking a man tied up in the fighting of the previous year going through the surrendered cities like a victor.

For the sake of his honour and prestige, the comte de Crussol preferred to hand over the towns under his command to the maréchal de Vielleville rather than to the vicomte de Joyeuse. By being the one to provide the cities and towns to Vielleville he put himself in the position of a royal agent, on a par with the vicomte de Joyeuse. To hand them over to Joyeuse would be to subordinate himself to the lieutenant-general as a defeated rebel.

=== Military presence in Languedoc ===
Royal troops, fresh off the reconquest of Le Havre from the English would arrive in Languedoc beginning in December 1563. It was the royal intention that they would aid in the maintenance of the edict of Amboise. Languedoc would in the end host around 1,600 to 1,800 infantry and a few companies of gendarmes. Among the compagnies lodged in Languedoc between 1563 and 1566 was that of the duc de Nevers. Another Italian's compagnie, that of marquis of Massa Lombarda, could also be found in Languedoc during this period, though its commander was absent and the compagnie managed by the lieutenant. That of a certain Italian, Scipion de Vimercat, was quartered in the Albigeois. The French comte de Gramont's compagnie of seventy-five men-at-arms was to be found in the Commingeois in 1566. The seigneur de Saint-Sulpice also enjoyed a compagnie in the south thanks to the royal favour he was in. In the midi-Toulousian, a compagnie was created for the seigneur de La Valette in 1564 composed of seventy-five men-at-arms and then the seigneur de Caillac in 1567 which comprised forty-nine men-at-arms.

With the threat of corsairs looming in May 1565, the governor Damville reorientated much of his soldiery towards the ports of Languedoc.

Hoping to see the burden on his people lessened, on 28 February 1567 Charles ordered the seigneur de Damville, the governor of Languedoc, to have the soldiers of Francesco d'Este, which were garrisoned at Marvejols withdrawn from the place. This garrison had been staying there without paying, and in their new base they were to pay for what they took at the rates specified in royal ordinances.

=== Damville's government ===
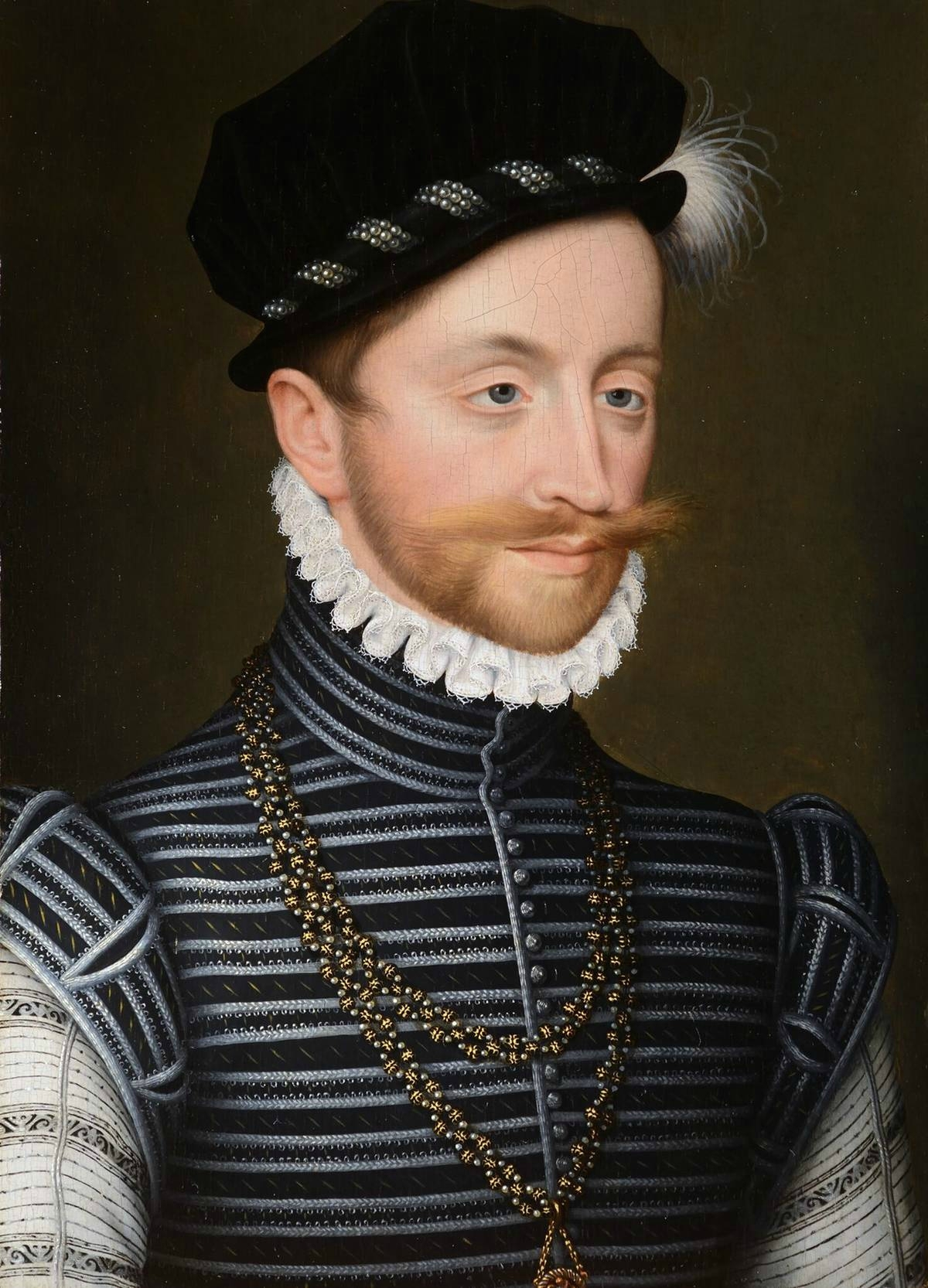
Seigneur de Damville, governor of Languedoc

The governors of the provinces were to have a central role in the application of the edict of Amboise. This was a problem for the constable de Montmorency who needed to remain near the centre of royal power. He therefore resigned his charge as governor of Languedoc on 12 May 1563 in favour of his second eldest son, the seigneur de Damville. Much of Languedoc was still under the de facto authority of the comte de Crussol who was slow to disarm. The day before Montmorency handed over the government of Languedoc to his son, Charles permitted Crussol to continue acting as lieutenant-general of the province until the arrival of maréchal de Vielleville.

The new governor Damville had no prior role in the conflict which had torn apart the south, though he would quickly build a reputation that discredited himself among the Protestants regardless.

The new governor of Languedoc, Damville, entered his province in October, stopping first in Toulouse. In royal fashion, all the city's notables came out to greet him. His entry into Toulouse was in grand style, with four-hundred Catholic nobles, among whom the seigneur de Monluc, cardinal d'Armagnac, seigneur de Strozzi and baron de Terride. Damville was met by an honour-guard of the basoche and confraternities of Toulouse. He then proceeded through the city to the palace of the parlement. Reception followed, then a mass in the cathedral. This grandiose Catholic arrival served for many to illustrate the triumph of Catholicism in Toulouse. He had been offered the honour of entering the city under a canopy, but declined it, noting that this was something one should offer only the king. He would stay in the city for three days, enjoying every comfort.

On 20 October 1563, Damville gave mandate to the baron de Bellegarde, the sénéchal of Toulouse to publish the peace articles with particular emphasis on disarmament.

Disarmament was of capital importance to the crown. Charles instructed the governor Damville to designate châteaux at which the weapons of the people of the province, be they Catholic or Protestant, would be deposited. Damville chose the locations inside his government except for Toulouse and the Lauragais (the region south-east of Toulouse) by letter of 7 February 1564. For Toulouse and the Lauragais, authority was delegated to the consuls, présidents (senior judges of the parlement) and capitouls (municipal leaders of Toulouse) to designate and establish the places (with two or three to be chosen inside Toulouse). There was a strong resistance to disarming in the various cities. In Montpellier and Toulouse there was resistance to the order, even with a threat of serious fine for violation.

Damville would impose garrisons on the towns that had been taken into rebellion against the crown by the Protestants during the first war of religion. Tievant argues this was not a punitive measure on them, but rather the means by which the pacification was enforced and the coexistence of religions ensured.

These troops would remain in this distribution until Charles arrived in Languedoc in October 1564. The city of Narbonne appealed for exemption from hosting a garrison but without success.

==== Crisis of authority with the crown ====
On 14 December 1563, the king clarified his ambition that public office should be open to all without regard to religion. Tievant describes this ambition as 'utopian', and notes that only Montpellier would manage something like it in Languedoc with its 5 December 1563 election of a bi-confessional consulate. Damville had little interest in seeing this policy spread to other places in Languedoc. The Protestants were rebels who had little business being in government. He quickly moved to oversee 'extraordinary electoral procedures' in the various places the Protestants had held during the first French War of Religion. He personally selected the men who would be responsible for the municipal elections across the diocese of Nîmes, Béziers, Castres, Viviers, Uzès and Montpellier. The historian Harding describes the influence of Damville and his lieutenant Joyeuse over municipal elections as being focused on 'insecure towns' in around these six diocese. Their strategy was to select several urban notables, who would elect the council in the presence of Damville.

Damville also looked to expel all 'strangers' from these formerly Protestant dominated cities. This targeted Protestants who had come to the cities of Languedoc from Provence, Dauphiné and other places in the kingdom during 1562. They had now been living in the cities of Languedoc for two years but were driven from the places by Damville who argued they were vagrants liable to cause sedition. They protested against this situation to the crown during January 1564. Likewise the comte de Crussol and his brother the baron d'Acier protested against the proroguing of elections undertaken by Damville. Rather than directly indicate to Damville that his policy was unacceptable, the court looked to revoke his policy through the intermediary of the extraordinary commissioners in the province, Baucquemare and Mesmes (who had arrived in Languedoc around October 1563). Baucquemare would subsequently be killed during the carrying out of his commission. This occasioned a royal response from Charles who observed that the murder was not only in defiance of a representative of the royal will, but that it needed to be responded to in such a manner as future commissioners need not fear any harm might come to them.

During December 1563, the deeply Catholic Estates of Languedoc, which met in Narbonne, attempted to argue that the province should be exempt from the imposition of commissioners. They begged the king not to permit a diversity of religions on Languedoc and to act against Protestant preachers. They requested that the seigneur de Damville spend the implementation of the edict of Amboise until the king gave his response. Charles gave the commissioners the authority to override Damville's policies by royal ordinance of 23 and 27 January 1564. He informed Languedoc that like the other provinces of the kingdom it was to implement the edict of Amboise. In addition, two new commissioners were dispatched to oversee that the elections undertaken in eastern Languedoc accorded with the edict of Amboise, Saint Père and Reynaud de Beaune, two maîtres des requêtes. These commissioners formed the nucleus of a conflict between Damville and the court around March 1564.

Around the end of 1563, having been given to understand that Protestant worship had not been established in all the sites afforded to their religion by the crown, the seigneur de Damville was asked to send a list of places in Languedoc where Protestant worship had been established, signed by his own hand. In all of Languedoc there were only three sites designated, and one of these was outside Damville's jurisdiction in Rouergue. His response made it clear other sites would be established as necessary.

Word that Damville had taken it upon himself to have a prominent Protestant pastor hanged reached the court in February 1564. This greatly frustrated the Coligny-Châtillon brothers; who demanded that the seigneur de Damville be relieved of the office of the governorship of Languedoc. They were not satisfied in this request.

When Damville learned in February of what the commissioners were doing, he ordered them halt, while he sought more explicit instruction from Charles. He sent a representative to the court on 1 March with an extensive memorandum, as well as a letter for his father, the constable de Montmorency. In these correspondences, he asserted that as governor of Languedoc he enjoyed the greatest cognisance and authority in these matters. Further, there was a risk of creating confusion in the province by having commissions pulling in a different direction to him.

The matter came before the royal council and was ultimately settled in Damville's favour. Catherine gave assurances to Damville, and the royal letters of 23 and 27 January were revoked. Damville's policies could thus stand. Despite this apparent victory, Charles responded favourably to the Protestants on 8 March, affirming the right he had expounded upon in December that men could hold public office irrespective of their religion.

The problem of Protestant access to municipal office in Languedoc would continue to bubble away, and Charles would attempt to resolve it during his stay in Languedoc in favour of the Protestants, as part of his grand tour of the kingdom. This did not succeed, and the municipal elections would continue to exclude Protestants until 1567.

==== Remuneration ====
Around February 1565, Damville found himself concerned by the large number of Spanish galleys close to the French coast. As a result of this, he got into a dispute with the seigneur de Monluc concerning the intentions of Philip II.

Damville would remain in Languedoc until January 1566, and by the time he left the province was pacified.

On 10 February 1566, the seigneur de Damville became a maréchal of France. This gave him hierarchical superiority over the provost of Languedoc. It also afforded him power over the apparatus that maintained the royal troops in his province. Outside of the provincial provost, appointments to the various charges were to be made on his advice. Back in 1565, he had been urged by the duc d'Orléans, brother of king Charles, to appoint one of his servants as commissaire ordinaire des guerres on the understanding this officer would be subordinate to him on his establishment as maréchal.

Since 1540, the Estates of Languedoc had secured the right to proffer 'gifts and salaries' to the governor of the province, as well as other royal officials who appeared before them. In 1567, Damville received 16,000 livres by this means, with the vicomte de Joyeuse receiving 5,000 livres.

=== Toulouse ===
==== Legacy of civil disorder ====
Toulouse's 1562 had been particularly violent, racked by a failed Protestant coup to seize the city, over which the parlement had led the counterattack. One of the capitouls who had involved themselves in the coup and had not escaped had his head nailed up publicly, and a plaque was installed at the hôtel de ville with the various sentences the parlement had handed down to the leading rebels as a reminder of their perfidy. The city of Toulouse would only accept the return of the Protestants to the city in return for them swearing a profession of Catholic faith.

In his various orders to Toulouse, Charles would request the removal of the head of the rebel capitoul from its instillation. Similarly, the king and the administration of Toulouse sparred over the memory of the uprising. Those capitouls elected after May 1562 had struck their deposed colleagues from the annals of the city, as well as striking their coats of arms. Charles requested these damages be reversed. The other seven condemned capitouls, who had been able to flee, were meant to be able to return to the city by the peace. Their property had been sold off, and it would not be until 13 August 1563 that they attained from royal council the return of the remaining funds of their sold property. This was furthered in a 12 April 1564 royal commission that ordered their property be returned to them, as well as their reintegration into Toulouse. Two more commissions, one of May and one of September reiterated these points. It was only with the king's arrival in Toulouse in February 1565 that the current judicial officials could be forced to abide by the king's judgement concerning the return of the capitouls, even so as late as 1572, one of the capitouls had yet to recover all his property.

A Catholic text, glorifying the bloody repression against Protestants during the civil war, which had been financed by the Toulousian treasury, was ordered banned by the king. This ban did not stop the work from circulating in the libraries of Toulouse. Similarly, the city engaged in a celebratory procession each May to commemorate their triumph over the Protestants in the civil war. Though prohibited by the crown, this procession would continue each year into the eighteenth-century.

Toulouse had played host to a Catholic League in the dying days of the first civil war. Such organisations were prohibited by the edict of Amboise, and the organisation would be promptly dissolved. The cardinal d'Armagnac gave warning on the disorders this measure would mean going forward by letter to Catherine of 13 April. He predicted the fall of Toulouse to their enemies, and noted people were begging him to take action. By contrast, the seigneur de Monluc, who had helped organise the league, withdrew from Toulouse, focusing his attentions on Agen to the west.

==== Parlement ====
Though the parlement of Toulouse registered the edict of Amboise on 15 April 1563, the cardinal d'Armagnac and parlementaires refused to distribute it or display it anywhere. This reticence was justified on the grounds that to display it would be so unpopular with the Catholic population that it would bring about civil disorder.

Similar problems were to be found in the royal efforts to see the expelled parlementaires returned to their property and offices. This included men such as Jean de Coras, and Arnaud de Cavavgnes. Charles ordered that they be received by the Toulouse parlement on 15 April 1563. In the hopes of frustrating this plan, the Catholic parlementaires instituted a Catholic oath of office. The parlement gave order that all officials would have to swear to their Catholic faith before the cardinal d'Armagnac in the cathedral of Toulouse, with those who refused to be denied a place in government.

In the solemn session of 10 May, the Protestants were thus absent. Two maîtres des rêquetes (master of requests, a senior judicial official) were dispatched from Paris to get Armagnac and the premier président (first président - principal judge of the parlement) Daffis to concede, but the authorities in Toulouse refused to consider the possibility of officials who had participated in the attempted coup of May 1562 returning to government. Among those involved in the campaign to see the parlementaires readmission was the royal commissioner Antoine Fumée. For those officials who had lost their position as a result of the confession of faith that had been instituted, rather than receive a hearing before an appeal panel and judge, Daffis implemented a change by which they would have their case examined before a committee of magistrates. They would enjoy the right to send any contentious cases onwards to Paris. This served as a method of stalling a disagreeable decision by making the process incredibly lengthy. This was especially true as when the case was returned from Paris, the parlement could begin the case again, functionally acting as a retrial. Thus, on average, each case took over six months to resolve. Charles attempted again to get the parlementaires to bend, but by letter of 27 May 1564, Daffis wrote him that it was not possible for him to implement this policy at present given the potential for backlash. He therefore advised that Charles wait until he arrived in the city to enforce it. The matter was therefore only resolved in February 1565.

In cases of Protestant families who attempted to acquire inherited offices from their deceased family members, the Catholic magistracy threw up the roadblock that first hand testimony be given to lawyers to validate before the cases could come before courts. This was difficult for Protestant appellants to provide to the satisfaction of Catholic officers.

Another matter of concern for the royal authority in Toulouse was the embezzlement of royal funds by the royalist Catholic authorities during the war. It needed to be verified that the money the city had stolen had been devoted to the war effort, and not to private ends. To this end, the accounts of the parlement's appointed receiver Liphard Bidault had to be verified. After some auditing, the king signed off on the Toulousian fiscal requisitioning. By doing this, the crown also signalled its approval for the role the parlement and Monluc had asserted for themselves in Toulouse during the war. By letters patent of 4 April 1564, the Toulousians were absolved of responsibility for repayment. This was followed with further absolution on 7 August 1564 for the embezzlement of funds that had been gathered since 1558 for the purpose of the building of a new bridge for the war efforts. In addition to embezzlement, large loans had also been raised for war expenses that required repayment. For Toulouse this sum totalled around 86,000 livres. By letters patent of 20 July 1564, it was agreed that the money for a bridge would be diverted for the coming three years to pay off the creditors. The capitouls would dip into the fund every six months to make indiscriminate loan repayments.

In August 1564, the parlement of Toulouse was granted cognisance of cases relating to the edict of Amboise. The historian Roberts sees in this a reflection of the inability of the royal commissioners to handle the case load put on them.

From 27 July 1567 to 12 August 1567, a gathering took place in one of the suburbs of Toulouse under the instruction of the parlement of Toulouse. It was agreed to raise an army, which would be paid for by the diocese of Auch, Comenge, Couserans, Tarbes, Lombès and various other territories. the seigneur de Montespan would serve as the army's superintendent.

==== Worship and property ====
The Protestants of Toulouse, by the terms of the edict, could no longer practice their faith in the city. They were assigned a site of worship first at Grenade, and then at Villemur, both of which were over twenty kilometres away from the city. By the time of the outbreak of the second war of religion, the Protestants of Toulouse were travelling all the way to Montauban to worship.

The maîtres des requêtes dispatched from Paris complained that their efforts to see Protestants restored to their property was being frustrated by the parlementaires. The magistrates argued that they could not work with appeals in such cases as the property had changed in nature or usage since its seizure. The parlement of Toulouse would be compelled to recognise the reinstatement of Protestant property, including that which had been sold off during the first war to pay for the military efforts. Those who had purchased the property, thereby providing the funds to the city, would require compensation for its return. The cour des comptes examined a list of the owners, as well as the amount of money they had lost in making the purchases, so an official compensation scheme could be devised for the return of the property to the Protestants. This process was complete by December 1563.

There was considerable reluctance to go ahead with this process, such that Charles had to issue letters patent on 9 April 1565 to compel the progression of restitution. The bridge fund tax revenue which had been made available to the capitouls would serve also as the source of the funds to compensate the buyers.

==== Peace in Toulouse ====
Complaints by the royal officials were made about the involvement of the basoche militia in the city guard, a violation of the edict of Amboise's prohibitions.

On 17 May 1563, a procession took place in Toulouse to mark the one-year anniversary of the suppression of the Protestant coup during the civil war. The maîtres des requêtes reported on this for the king, noting the wide range of Toulousians who partook in the event. The crown responded by declaring the procession a provocation, that was not to be repeated again.

The king would later confirm the exemption for Toulouse from the taillon tax.

As late as 1564, the Protestant consistory of Toulouse remained active, though there is no evidence they possessed a pastor.

In early 1566, the bishop of Valence was appointed surintendant des finances. It was under the purview of this office that he made for Toulouse, in the hopes of ending a quarrel between the French and Spanish students in the city.

Come February 1565, the consulate of Toulouse came in for chastisement from the crown for interfering and impeding the work of the local commissioners.

The cardinal d'Armagnac wrote to Catherine in June 1565 to express concern about developments in the Lauragais near Toulouse. He complained that there were armed gatherings taking place in Pamiers, Mauvoisin, Montauban and La Bastide. He suspected, given the Catholic festivities that were shortly to be forthcoming, that they intended for an armed uprising. He expressed his frustration that Toulouse did not possess someone with the determination to enforce the king's edicts.

Rumour swirled in Toulouse in 1566 that the Protestants were gathering at Puylaurens, Montauban, and Pamiers with the goal of attacking Toulouse and murdering the Catholics inside. The capitoulat of the city spoke of how their city had been infiltrated by troublemakers, who had been responsible for the events of the first civil war. Depositions were undertaken which expanded the rumour to not only be a capture of Toulouse, but also the neighbouring towns.

=== Montpellier ===
Before handing back the churches they had seized to the Catholics, which they were obliged to do as part of the peace, the Protestants of Montpellier ransacked the churches, and broke the bells.

Even more challenging that disarming the population was getting the Protestants to readmit the Catholics and the Catholics to readmit the Protestants in places where they had been respectively dominant during the war. Though Caylus was able to assert he had restored the Catholic clergy to their property by 29 August, he admitted they dared not undertake worship for fear of Protestant retaliation. The Protestant elements of the cathedral chapter in Montpellier informed Caylus on 2 August that they did not wish to see Catholic worship resume in their city. The Catholic bishop of the diocese remained at nearby Maguelone.

In Montpellier, Protestant domination of the consulate was broken in December 1563, with Catholic ascendency being re-established. Protestant control of Montpellier would not return until the second civil war.

=== Nîmes ===
==== Imposition of the Catholic settlement ====
On 16 November 1563, the seigneur de Damville made his Entry into the city of Nîmes. With him, a small band of soldiers, dignitaries, several bishops, and members of the parlement of Toulouse. He quickly saw to the overthrow of the Protestant regime in the city, installing Catholic consuls. He gave command that the Catholic clergy be allowed to return to the city. In charge of this new administration: the seigneur de Tharaux and François de Gras, lawyers of the cathedral chapter. This new administration re-established the practice of hiring a Lenten preacher, and employed a priest to daily say Mass in the cathedral. A Catholic chaplain was hired for the hospital.

It was not possible for the restored Catholic administration to follow an aggressive course. As much as did the Protestants and moderates, the new Catholic consuls opposed the presence of royal troops in the city. They were expensive, and a danger to local liberties. Further, their presence risked driving the moderates into the arms of the Protestants. Thus, they requested their removal, outside of the context of the guard of the château. These same expenses were used as the reason that it was not possible to afford the Observantin friars alms, so that they might return to Nîmes, their monastery having been sacked by the Protestants. Financial considerations would also preclude the possibility of the repurchase of church property that the Protestants had sold off during their time in power.

The regime contented itself to exclude Protestants from powerful positions and restore Catholic worship. Such measures were unlikely to achieve the larger goal of returning the Protestants to the Catholic creed.

The consular elections of 1564 would be similarly controlled by the royal authorities. Charles, who had visited Nîmes in December, ordered that two candidates for each consular position be chosen by lot for the seigneur de Damville to select the candidate. Tulchin believes that Damville likely interfered with the lottery process. Thus, Damville selected François de Gras as first consul. The Protestants protested virulently, but to no avail.

==== Radicalisation ====
The new consuls wanted to push things further and saw the king as the means to achieve that. Thus, they petitioned him for the restoration of Mass, adherence to the edict of Amboise, and that the crown cover the costs of purging the Protestants from the présidial court (courts between the bailliage and parlement level, established during the reign of Henri II). The current Protestant office holders would need to be financially compensated for their dispossession, and the consuls hoped to free the city from such a fiscal burden. The crown refused to accommodate this cost.

From Toulouse, in March, the king made declarations of relevance to Nîmes. In all benefices where Mass was not being celebrated, the revenues were to be seized. But, on the other hand, Protestants could not be excluded from office on the basis of religion, and he further outlined several lots to be provided to them in Nîmes for the construction of churches. The royal troops in Nîmes were to be confined to barracks in the château.

The Protestants took up the opportunity presented by this, building on the allocated sites, with the presiding judge of the présidial court laying the first foundation stone. In relation to Charles' other demands, the Protestants lacked the ability to get the Catholics to open up control of the municipal council to them. The Catholics similarly lacked the ability to remove the Protestants from control of the benefices.

Soon after Charles' declaration, the Catholics resolved to re-establish Mass in the cathedral of Nîmes.

In the elections of late 1565, a suite of Catholics would again be imposed upon the government of Nîmes by the crown. The one-time Protestant leader, the comte de Crussol, would boast at the end of January 1566, that he had seen the resurrection of the Mass in Nîmes to the letter of the king's command. Tulchin is sceptical of this, seeing more of the initiative as coming from the local Catholics, and flowing out of the March decree.

In May 1566, the cathedral chapter published their mass schedule, indicating the priest assigned for each week. Men were hired to improve and supplement the choir. The declaration outpaced confidence however, canons were willing to indicate the restoration of Mass, but not necessarily confident enough to perform the rite themselves. Thus, many priests failed to show for their allocated weeks.

Frustrated with the policy their party had pursued over the preceding years, the cathedral chapter ousted the seigneur de Tharaux and François de Gras from the positions of chapter lawyers in June 1566. In their stead, another Catholic lawyer named Guy Rochette, who was younger, and did not share Tharaux's taint of connections with the Protestants predating the religious schism in the community, was chosen.

==== Protestant fightback ====
Around the end of 1566, the frustrated Protestants looked to regain some of the initiative in the consular election process. They attempted to see the seneschal, Jean de Senneterre, appointed to preside over the elections. Negotiations between the Protestants and Catholics followed, with the Catholics sending two representatives to meet with two Protestant representatives. The Protestants proposed splitting the consulate evenly, two Protestant consuls, two Catholic. The Catholic representatives, Tharaux and de Gras, refused any such compromise, and walked away without a deal. The council would select an uncompromising suite of Catholics, with the dubiously legitimate lottery putting forth Guy Rochette, the new lawyer of the cathedral chapter, as first consul.

Growing in confidence and strength, the chapter gave order in early 1567 for Masses in honour of the virgin, and the return of the Corpus Christi procession.

By letters patent of 10 April 1567, Charles afforded the consuls of Nîmes, and various other towns in the region, the control of police powers. This circumvented the Protestant controlled présidial court. Subsequent to this, rumour swirled of a Protestant coup, with the council informing the vicomte de Joyeuse of the word and asking him to proffer support in quelling any revolts. Facing an increasingly delicate situation, Joyeuse was unable to offer anything to Nîmes.

The Protestants of Nîmes were greatly aggrieved at the usurpation of their city's municipal office the seigneur de Damville had masterminded. They were also frustrated that their worship had been moved out into the suburbs of the city. With a majority of the notables being Protestant in the city, their exclusion made things a powder keg. Those consuls which Damville had imposed upon the city had to meet at the château for their safety. While the militia was commanded by a Protestant (captain of the city Bolhargues), the guard of the château was in the hands of a Catholic (a certain La Garde) and the two officers of the two authorities quarrelled often. In May 1567, the council was alarmed enough about the potential impact of this conflict, to seek to mediate between Bolhargues and La Garde. Hoping to placate Bolhargues, the council tried and failed to see La Garde removed from his office. The historian Tulchin notes that their confidence in Bolhargues was misplaced. Skirmishes were not infrequent. The seigneur de Damville had the city surrounded by a company of Albanian mercenaries who carried out a policy of brutal repression.

=== Montauban ===
Protestants would maintain almost entirely uninterrupted control of the municipal government of Montauban in this period (and beyond up to 1632) with the exception of the years 1565-1567 when a religiously split consulate was imposed upon the city. The urban elite of Montauban existed in a relative concord with the Protestant ministers of the city.

The return of Catholicism was refused in the city of Montauban, which had thrice been sieged by the royalists during the first war of religion. Catholic clergy attempting to return to Montauban found the prospect difficult as the church had been stripped of all its properties and belongings. They were subject to harassment and refused in their efforts to reclaim their benefices. It took the application of force to get the consuls of the city to abide by the edict of Amboise. The seneschal of Quercy was to inform the Montalbanais that they must cease to practice Protestantism and that if they did not lay down their arms immediately, the seigneur de Monluc would be sent to the city. The seneschal succeeded in disarming the populace and arresting several Protestant pastors. He could not however end Protestant worship in the city.

It was only with the arrival of the commissioners Antoine Fumée and Jacques Viart in 1564 that the churches of Montauban were transferred back from their Protestant controllers to the Catholics.

As Charles conducted his tour of the kingdom, the people of Montauban invited Charles IX to their city, he informed them he would accept on condition they razed the defences of their city.

In January 1565, the seigneur de Monluc forwarded the complaints of the Catholics of Montauban to the French crown. The consuls and officials harboured foreign persons (those not from Montauban), priests had apostatised and taken wives, Catholic religious days were flouted, the arsenal was being restocked, and the populace remained armed. One captain in particular conducted vigilante action against the Catholics of Montauban. The Protestants also held sway in the sénéchaussée court, thereby denying the Catholic denizens of Montauban justice.

The seigneur de Monluc oversaw the removal of some of Montauban's artillery on 30 March 1565, which was taken off to Agen to be stored. Those weapons that remained in the city were inventoried for Monluc's benefit.

The Protestant colloquy of September 1565 agreed that notaries who recorded wills should not include any clauses that were 'superstitious or idolatrous' (i.e. Catholic). Warning was given that lay-people in some areas were baptising children.

An elaborate punishment for those who blasphemed was devised in 1566 for which an iron cage was installed on the bridge over the Tarn. The guilty were to be locked in the cage which was lowered three times into the water. There is no record of this punishment being used after 1567.

In 1567, the canons of Montauban's cathedral chapter met (not in Montauban but rather a nearby town) to draw up articles requiring the Catholic clergy to live in good modesty, avoiding dissolute public games, bad company, and dubious inns.

=== Castres ===
Catholic control over Castres would be secured stretching from 1563 to 1567. According to the memoires of a certain Jacques Gaches, on word of the peace, Joyeuse dispatched a company to garrison Castres under the command of a captain Sonnerie. These soldiers were quartered in Protestant households and treated them poorly. Damville subsequently appointed a d'Ambres as his lieutenant in Castres, this figure entering the city alongside the bishop on 17 October. Catholics followed them into the city, insulting and threatening those they encountered. Armed company for the entry beat the Protestants, crying out that just as they had been forced to go to Protestant service, now they would force the Protestants to go to Mass. In Gaches' opinion, the Protestants would have repelled these attempts were it not for the plague ripping through the city.

In December 1563, Castres played host to a double election, in which the Catholics had departed the city to choose a consulate exclusively devoted to their interests.

=== Other Languedoc towns ===
The Catholic controlled cities where conflict had been most bitter, such as Lodève, Frontignan, and Gignac were even more resistant than the Protestant ones to the return of their Protestant residents. This extended to the point of firing arquebuses at Joyeuse's envoy as he attempted to enforce the issue.

The Catholics of Réalmont attempted to resist a site of Protestant worship, arguing that there were only twenty-five to thirty Protestants among their number, and no Protestant minister.

The archbishop of Avignon theoretically enjoyed seigneurial rights of high justice over the place of Saint-Laurent-des-Arbres in Languedoc. However, his power to stop the Protestants of Saint-Laurent from practicing their religion was totally ineffectual. The bailli of Le Buis, insulted by the archbishops attempts, would place a rotting animal in front of his door.

A little while after the violent episode in Pamiers (which occurred around May-June 1566), a new trouble broke out in Grenade with the Protestants undertaking a rising in the city.

=== Roussillon ===
In the first months of 1564, the cardinal d'Armagnac utilised his prerogatives as inquisitor general to seized two merchants who had fled to Roussillon in hopes of escaping charges of heresy. He utilised nearby Spanish infantry from the border towns to affect their arrest, which proved a cause of controversy. Thus, although the capture and trial proved a success, both the queen of Navarre's court at Pau, and the French crown were outraged. Roussillon was part of the queen of Navarre's jurisdiction, but the cardinal d'Armagnac had turned to the Spanish king.

== Foix ==
Unlike in her sovereign lands of Béarn, the queen of Navarre, as comtesse de Foix, controlled the territory as a fief of the French crown. Therefore, she could not impose her religious policies on the territory in the same way. She would nevertheless encourage Protestantism in Foix.

In November 1564, Spanish forces violated the borders of Foix. The French ambassador objected to this, arguing that the queen of Navarre's religion and her territorial rights were two separate matters.

Pailhès speculates that during the prince de Béarn's visit to Foix (undertaken during the court's stay in Toulouse in the first months of 1565) members of his entourage affirmed the liberty of conscience for the population, a policy not incompatible with the royal one, and which had recently been announced for the territory of Béarn.

=== Pamiers ===
==== Return of Catholic hegemony ====
Between 1563 and 1567, the king's council ruled on the subject of Pamiers seven times.

The coming of the edict of Amboise did not bring peace to Pamiers. The Protestants continued their campaign of pillage. On 25 March, the Protestants ransacked the convents of the Cordeliers, Carmelites and Augustinians, with several priests killed in this assault. An investigation was ordered into this, with Charles ordering the seigneur de Damville, governor of Languedoc, to occupy the city. Damville arrived in Pamiers on 4 August 1563, with Catherine leading negotiations to avoid violent resistance to his arrival. Eight-hundred residents of Pamiers were exiled, and Catholic violence replaced Protestant violence.

The bishop of Pamiers, Robert de Pellevé, moved to see Catholicism restored in the city, and Protestantism restricted to the letter of the edict of Amboise.

Both the Protestants and Catholics of Pamiers brought their grievances to Charles, who was then touring the kingdom. He gave his answer while he was in Toulouse in early 1565. The king ordered that his edicts be applied in Pamiers. Stolen goods were to be returned, compensation afforded for damages, the consulate of Pamiers renewed, and Catholic worship restored in the city. Commissioners from the parlement would be responsible for seeing these resolutions enforced on the city.

In June 1565, Pamiers was annexed into the government of Languedoc. Pailhès notes that this indicated the suspension of the rights of the city's urban privileges, as well as those of the queen of Navarre and bishop of Foix over Pamiers.

The parlement of Toulouse objected to the choice of Pamiers as the site for Protestant worship in the region during 1566. The royal council declared, by order of 20 February 1566, that Protestantism worship was not to be permitted in Pamiers. It's practice there was contrary to the edict of Amboise.

==== Revolt ====
On 23 May 1566, Ascension Day, the Catholic procession of youth in Pamiers got into a violent confrontation with a Protestant service, clashes following from an incident of stone throwing. This episode ended with the besieging of the Protestant suburb of Loumet. In the wake of this, the parlement banned provocative processions.

The processions continued, on 2 June, Whit Monday, a procession was held in honour of Saint-Antonin. Then, on 3 June, public dancing, some of it done under arms, in costumes the Protestants found offensive. The viguier (a local judicial official) of Pamiers attempted to disperse the provocateurs, but a riot ensued in which the Catholics invaded the Loumet suburb and the Protestants rose up at large, sacking the Mendicant convents (on 5 June), with the monks killed, torching houses, and massacring those they found. Between 200 and 400 Catholics were killed depending on the source taken. Those who survived fled from Pamiers, which entered full Protestant occupation. Brunet puts the number lower, at 120 Catholics.

Crété argues the Protestants were 'tired of being persecuted by their neighbours'. Mariéjol also describes the Protestants of Pamiers of having been subject to troubles by the Catholic neighbours.

In the city of Foix, revenge was taken against the Protestants for events at Pamiers, with seventeen killed. Others were forced to flee.

Word of this atrocity arrived with Catherine from the seigneur de Damville, on 13 June 1566. Catherine wanted to make an example of this defiance of the pacification edict, the actions of which she described as more infamous than those of the Goths or 'Turks'.

==== Repression ====
The vicomte de Joyeuse was entrusted with the restoration of order in the city. He dispatched the seigneur de La Valette to Pamiers to deal with the rising. The seigneur de Monluc also had a role to play in the suppression of the Protestant uprising of Pamiers, alongside the président of the parlement of Toulouse. A certain captain Sarlabous attempted to install companies in Pamiers, but the city closed its gates to him. Negotiations were undertaken by the seigneur de Rambouillet and several local Protestant seigneurs (the vicomte de Rabat and vicomte de Calmont); with the support of the queen of Navarre. By this means, the worst was avoided. After those who were not from Pamiers had departed the city, as well as the most compromised Protestants (who fled variously to Le Mas d'Azil, Carla, Les Cabannes, Urs, and the territories of Béarn where Jeanne offered refuge), the royal soldiers occupied the place under the authority of the parlement of Toulouse.

They found the place ravaged and deserted. As the death sentences were handed down in absentia, some of those who had fled were able to avoid the justice, but those who had fled into the upper Ariège under the protection of Fantilhou, the captain of Gudanes, were murdered by the Catholics and the bands of the seigneur de Castelnau-Durban. Among those in the upper Ariège, the Protestant pastor Martin Tarchard was captured, paraded through the city of Foix, and hanged. He would be remembered as a martyr by the Protestants. A handful of executions also take place in Pamiers, with the judiciary that had failed to act against the Protestants replaced. Having been able to hold out in the mountains for a year, these executions would take place in May 1567. Charles then offered a royal amnesty, over the objections of the parlement of Toulouse. Catholicism was restored in Pamiers, and they were able to live in relative concord with their Protestant neighbours.

Around the end of 1566, the mayor of the city of Foix offered the comital château to Charles IX.

On Easter Sunday 1567, the seigneur de Monluc received orders to march against the Protestants of the comté de Foix. On 7 April, just as he was making to leave from Toulouse with his artillery to this end, he received counter-orders from Catherine. This was a cause for bitter complaints. Despite his hold order, troops nevertheless entered Foix. In Agen and Lectoure, protective measures were taken, with the governor Fontrailles dismissed.

== Guyenne ==
=== Succession ===
Catherine ensured the succession of the young prince de Béarn (future king Henri IV) to the government of Guyenne, which had been held by his father, as well as the position of admiral of Guyenne. Béarn also succeeded to the late king of Navarre's compagnie d'ordonnance. Given his young age, these appointments were for the moment, nominal, but they also presented revenue streams. Béarn's mother, Jeanne d'Albret, gave thanks to Catherine for these gestures in March 1563, though she credited her husband's service to the crown for their acquisition rather than any royal benevolence. She also unsuccessfully implored Catherine to relieve the seigneur de Monluc, of his charge of lieutenant-general of Guyenne (second in command to the governor).

=== Lieutenant-general Monluc ===
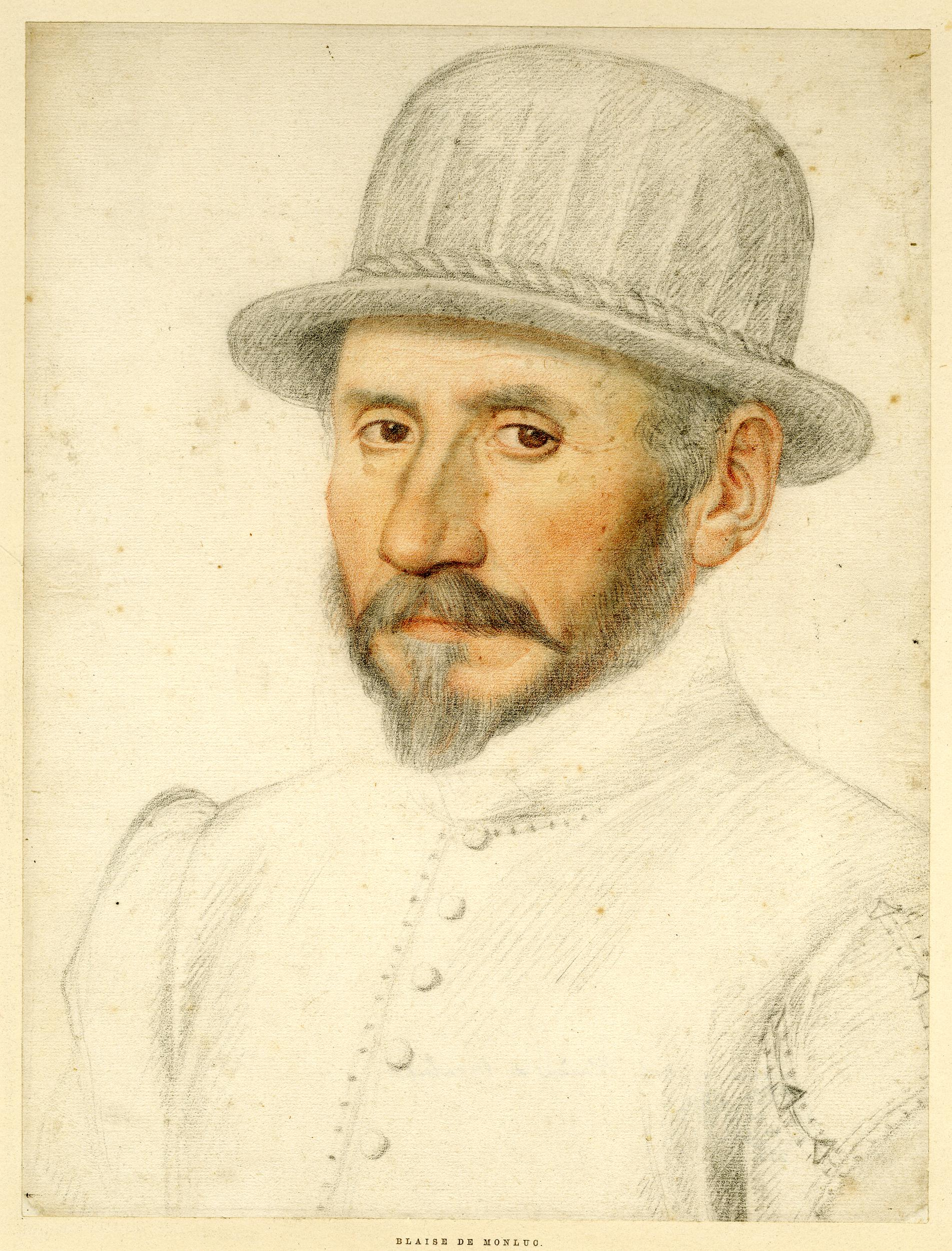
Seigneur de Monluc, lieutenant-general of Guyenne

In characterising the approach of the seigneur de Monluc to the implementation of the edict of Amboise, Souriac argues that he adopted a line of technical adherence. The commander would seek to aggressively ensure order, while being far less interested in seeing the terms of religious coexistence implemented. To this end, he worked to demobilise his soldiers.

Several Catholic Leagues formed with the intention of opposing 'heresy' had developed under the stewardship of the seigneur de Monluc in the dying days of the first French War of Religion. This included one at Agen, Bordeaux, and Toulouse. With the conclusion of this conflict, Catherine ordered Monluc to dissolve the Bordeaux League.

Monluc enjoyed the support of the consuls of Agen, Condom, and Auch. The zealous enthusiasm of these institutions was such that Monluc had to restrain them.

In the south-western territories overseen by the seigneur de Monluc, the occasional killing of a seigneur occurred during these years. Monluc also had Protestant preachers he deemed to be rabble rousers, such as a preacher in Villeneuve-sur-Lot hanged.

=== Commissioners ===
In August, the parlement would inform the royal commissioners for Guyenne, Antoine Fumée and Jehan Angenoust that they could not proceed with their work until the nature of their commission had been clarified with the crown.

In September, Fumée and Angenoust attempted to investigate a former procureur of Bordeaux, to the annoyance of the parlement which felt the commissioners were encroaching on the parlements jurisdiction.

After a few weeks of refusing to register their appointment, the parlement traded the registration for the sharing of information about the pacification effort. Thus, Foa sees the initial denial as a negotiation strategy. Indeed, a few weeks later, the parlement gave armed aid to Fumée concerning a delicate matter.

The commissioner Fumée complained that the commission he was executing had been smeared as a Protestant effort. Negotiations followed between the commissioners and the parlement, but by now Fumée was alone with his caseload, Angenoust having departed due to ill health. With local judges who were acceptable proving few and far between, Fumée estimated that it would take his commission six months per sénéchaussée (judicial administrative division). Roberts indicates that even if this was an exaggeration, a formidable caseload still stood before the commissioner.

Despite his conflicts with the parlement, in September, Fumée succeeded in securing the eviction of those who had occupied the château of the dame de Duras (widow of the Protestant seigneur de Duras). Those occupying the property had claimed they did so by approval of the parlement.

=== Bordeaux ===
==== Catholic League ====
Catherine wrote reproachfully on the subject of the Cadillac Catholic league to the seigneur de Monluc on 31 March. She opined that while it had served a worthy function in a time of war, there was no longer a reason for it to exist, and its maintenance constituted rebellion. Monluc was entrusted with seeing to its dismantling.

Though the edict of Amboise had been registered by the parlement of Bordeaux on 10 April, the comte de Candalle made no move to dissolve the Catholic League he had established. This illegal continuity greatly frustrated the Protestants. Five days later, on 15 April, the seigneur de Pardaillan wrote to Catherine to complain about the Catholic League, and opine that as far as he understood it, the magistracy of Guyenne was not hostile to the organisation. The premier président (most senior judge) of the parlement of Bordeaux, Lagebâton, wrote similarly to Catherine, imploring her to get the seigneur de Monluc to move against the organisation.

Monluc was caught between his support of the league and defying the crown. On 11 April he had assured Catherine no illegal associations existed in the region. He was backed up on this by the Catholic clergy of Bordeaux who assured Catherine similarly by letter of 15 April.

Lagebâton, and his fellow parlementaire moderates summoned the comte de Candalle before the body to justify himself. Candalle brought the mayor of Bordeaux, La Rivière with him, but this figure was dismissed by Lagebâton on the grounds that as a member of the League and a fanatical Catholic, he had no right to testify before the parlement. Lagebâton charged Candalle with activities that subverted the will of the king. Rather than respond to this, Candalle remonstrated against the actions of Lagebâton, on behalf of the Second Estate (i.e. the nobility). He demanded that the parlement legitimate his League, as it was a necessary institution to defend the crown, and Catholicism, against their enemies.

The royal commissioners for Guyenne, Antoine Fumée and Jehan Angenoust were ordered to intervene to settle this quarrel. They were unable to make progress due to opposition to their activities among the Catholic magistracy and nobility. Both Fumée and Angenoust had previously had their Catholicity challenged. Despite this, Roberts credits the difficulties they faced as deriving more from the parlement resenting their encroachment, than their religious sympathies.

Candalle continued his offensive against Lagebâton. By letter of 22 June to the king, his second in command, the vicomte d'Uza lambasted the premier président, requesting that he be reassigned somewhere outside the province. He attacked also the edict of Amboise, noting that Protestants continued to attack Catholics and ransack churches. This letter included an admission that a confederation had been formed among the nobility of Guyenne for the protection of their lives and property. It was stated this association had received the sign off of the seigneur de Monluc, to be assured that it did not violate any royal directive. Uza contended that the organisation no longer existed.

Anonymous Protestant death threats against the comte de Candalle, de Lauzan and the marquis de Trans were reported in July. These threats were viewed seriously by the parlementaire Roffignac who assigned two trusted Catholic councillors to examine the claims. Armed escorts were also to be provided to the nobles during their time in Bordeaux.

In the summer of 1563, rumour swirled that the Catholics of Guyenne had formed a new league.

==== Catholic hardliners against Lagebâton ====
On 30 July, Candalle made a new attempt against Lagebâton, this time in the grand'chambre of the parlement. He took umbrage with the characterisation of the Catholic Bordelais nobility Lagebâton had made to the conseil privé. His first attempt to arraign Lagebâton was a failure. In his second, he was cosigned by the vicomte d'Uza and the Catholic nobility. He made more progress here as he noted that Lagebâton had included the parlementaire Lange in his indictment. Lange had the right therefore to call Lagebâton before the grand'chambre.

In the commissioners' report of August to the crown, their conclusions concerning Candalle's league were vague, likewise their summary of confessional tensions or lack thereof in the province. None of the developments relating to the death threats, or Candalle's subsequent efforts against Lagebâton featured in their report.

On 6 September 1563, the comte d'Escars, the new governor of Bordeaux, appeared before the court. He accused Lagebâton, and the crown's commissioners of manufacturing evidence against leading Catholics. Escars and Lagebâton had enmity stretching back to the 1550s. While Escars' accusation would have to be heard before the grand'chambre, Lagebâton moved to see that Escars and his bodyguard be disarmed before they took the stand. This was an attack on Escars, who had the rights from the seigneur de Burie (the other lieutenant-general of Guyenne) to go about the parlement as he pleased under arms. Thus, Escars refused to appear, and the session was delayed.

In December, new effort to hold the session was undertaken, only for Escars to learn he had been banned from entering the parlement. The crown was forced to intervene. The crown found for Escars, who was permitted to enter the parlement while armed, and with a bodyguard if he deemed it appropriate.

Throughout 1564, Lagebâton accused the seigneur de Monluc, the comte de Candalle, the marquis de Trans and Lange of having revived the league of Cadillac and calling for armed resistance to the edict of Amboise. Come August, the clergy of the province was included in his indictment, in particular the archbishop of Bordeaux, Prévost de Sanssac.

The clergy gave their response in December 1564, they admitted many of their number had been involved in Catholic associations over the preceding years but defended this as necessary defensive involvement against the attacks of Protestants. They compared the Catholic associations with the Protestant synodal confederation. By their reckoning, the Catholic organisation was a defensive one, while the Protestants were offensive, subversive and violent. This remonstrance was due to come before the parlement, but Lagebâton denied the right of Sanssac to enter the chamber, on the grounds he had used against La Rivière. The crown again felt compelled to intervene to reconcile matters, dispatching the maître des requêtes (master of requests - a senior judicial official), the sieur de Vouzan, to reconcile the parties.

By May 1565, Sanssac had still not been permitted to present his case before the parlement. He complained at the slow progress of the affair. In a new petition, Lange would act as his prosecutor, while the comte de Candalle would serve as his second. This remonstrance was direct, seeking Lagebâton's removal on grounds of malpractice, and the retraction of all libels against the Catholics.

Lagebâton was not defeated, and he moved to interrupt the proceedings so that several technicalities relating to Sanssac's petition might be investigated. As he was being challenged directly, it was inappropriate for so many friends of Sanssac to be present, the hearing needed to be rescheduled for a private sitting at which only the litigants would be invited. He refused to be cross-examined by Lange, as a président of the court should not have to answer to an avocat. It should take the form of a debate not a trial, with challenges submitted in writing so that they might be read out by the clerk of the court, rather than being delivered by a friend of the plaintiff. Candalle too should have no part in the proceedings as the court was still investigating him. Finally, Sanssac was associated with the président Roffignac, and five councillors, and thus these figures should recuse themselves from involvement in the proceedings. This body blow to Sanssac's challenge caused the archbishop to withdraw his case. Before he departed, he noted he would bring it before the crown, and if the crown did not deliver him satisfaction, he would privately revenge himself in alliance with his brother, the seigneur de Sanssac.

One final attempt to oust Lagebâton would be made by Sanssac, Candalle, and Lange in August 1566, but they were again bested.

==== Catholic government ====
The parlement of Bordeaux ordered the seigneur de Montferrand in August 1563 that he was not to host Protestant services on the territory of his barony or duchy. This was on the grounds of the place's proximity to Bordeaux, in which Protestant worship was prohibited.

The Protestants of Guyenne complained that the site of worship they had been granted, the place of Saint-Macaire near Bordeaux was the 'most inconvenient in the whole sénéchaussée. Tidal rivers had to be crossed to reach the site.

The Protestants of the Bordelais in April 1566, in article six of their petition to the crown, protested against their forced participation in Catholic religious processions. Charles assented to their request. Despite this, processions would be a cause of ongoing conflict. They also requested the right to work on non-solemn Catholic holidays. This was also responded to favourably by Charles, who afforded them the right to work behind closed doors in such circumstances, but not on Sundays or solemn Catholic holidays.

To the fury of the seigneur de Lanssac, whose son, Guy de Saint-Gelais, held the office of mayor of Bordeaux, a governor was appointed to the city in 1567. Traditionally, the role of governor for Bordeaux had been performed on a collective basis by the jurats of Bordeaux, but now it was to be held by the baron de Terride.

=== Périgord ===
During 1565, the parlement of Bordeaux sent a commission into Périgord to investigate various disorders and troubles that owed their origins more to feud than religion. In the sénéchaussée of Périgueux alone thirteen feuds were recorded. The commission then moved on to Bergerac and Sarlat.

In the deep south, the Gramont and Luxe clans continued their long running feuding (which had begun three hundred years earlier).

=== Comminges ===
In the comté de Comminges, Protestantism made little in the way of inroads, despite the queen of Navarre owning lands there. She attempted to inculcate the religion into Comminges, but outside of some stirrings around Saint-Gaudens was able to achieve little.

=== Agen ===
==== Disbanding the league ====
In Agen, a Catholic league had been founded by Monluc in the dying days of the first French War of Religion. Monluc would dismantle the formal structures of this league following the war, as he informed Catherine in April. However, the legacy of the league would remain, and would afford greater strength to the Catholics of the Agenais going forward.

==== Defeat of the Protestant party ====
Within the city, a faction led by the lieutenant-criminel Antoine de Tholin looked to see prosecutions levelled against those who had attacked the clergy and Catholic community in the preceding months. Meanwhile, a Protestant faction led by the juge-mage Herman de Sevin looked to receive compensation for the sums taken from the Protestants during the civil war. Neither side accomplished much, foundering in the mi-partie justice system established in the présidial court.

Monluc had elevated a certain Lalande as governor of Agen, and this figure complained to the crown that he could not govern his city while Protestant judges delivered biased judgements. Sevin shot back at this with a reminder that offices in the city were no longer the exclusive prerogative of the Catholics, and that he should keep his nose out of mi-partie affairs. He further challenged Monluc's selection of Lalande as governor to begin with, an abuse of his military prerogatives in a time of peace. Sevin proposed several replacements for Lalande, all prominent Protestant nobles.

==== Disturbances ====
Come May, Monluc wrote to Catherine that the Protestants were plotting to seize Agen, and he advised Lalande to institute twenty-four-hour guard. Lalande responded by reforming a military council and giving word to the Estates of Agen. When the Estates opened the following month, Monluc and Lalande's administration was endorsed. The Estates urged that an inquiry be made into the mismanagement of Sevin and the Protestant consuls. The subsequent investigation, led by a member of the Catholic party, found Sevin guilty. Tholin followed this blow by suggesting that they should therefore move against Sevin, so that Lalande might be protected. Long before this verdict was handed down, Sevin had fled to Paris. Absent his presence, tensions cooled in the various bodies of Agen.

In 1565, the Protestant synod of the Agenais resolved to employ full-time ministers for its temples at Sainte-Foy, Clairac, Tonneins, and Nérac. Having learned of this, Lalande argued that it was illegal. Anticipating a rise in temperature, he summoned Monluc to Agen. Subsequently, a large arms cache was uncovered at Tonneins, with skirmishes unfolding in the countryside.

The Catholic party in Agen weighed its options in September and October. Lalande resolved that Agen would be the focal point of any clash in the region, and therefore he bolstered the cities defences. A captain of Monluc's was appointed military governor, and the military council was entrusted with securing the gates and searching Protestant homes for weapons. No attack on the city would come, with Gould expressing scepticism that an assault on the city was ever intended, though conceding Lalande's preparations may have dissuaded action.

Over the coming two years, a stalemate reigned. Neither Protestant nor Catholic forces in the Agenais making attempts to gain the initiative.

=== Millau ===
On 3 June 1563, three quarters of the population of Millau, along with the consuls of the city, made an appearance before the judge of the bailliage to request that the king be petitioned in favour of Protestant churches in Millau. This was assented to, and the consuls followed this up by requesting that a survey of the gathered men be conducted, to see if any favoured the restoration of the Mass in Millau. None in the crowd could be found in favour of the Mass. The syndic of the town protested that a quarter of the population of Millau was absent, and a house-to-house census was required to answer such a question. This house-to-house survey of the city of Millau was duly undertaken by the authorities. The responses were uniformly opposed to the Mass.

In explaining this, Heller lays out several possibilities, firstly that the Catholics had already fled, secondly that those who remained felt pressured to keep their opinions hidden. The historian ultimately settles on the marriage of Protestant identity and municipal independence. By the close bearing of Millau to the Protestant cause, the municipality could free itself from the Rodez based ecclesiastical-seigneurial oversight.

The commissioner Fumée restored the Catholics to control of their possessions in the city.

== Béarn ==
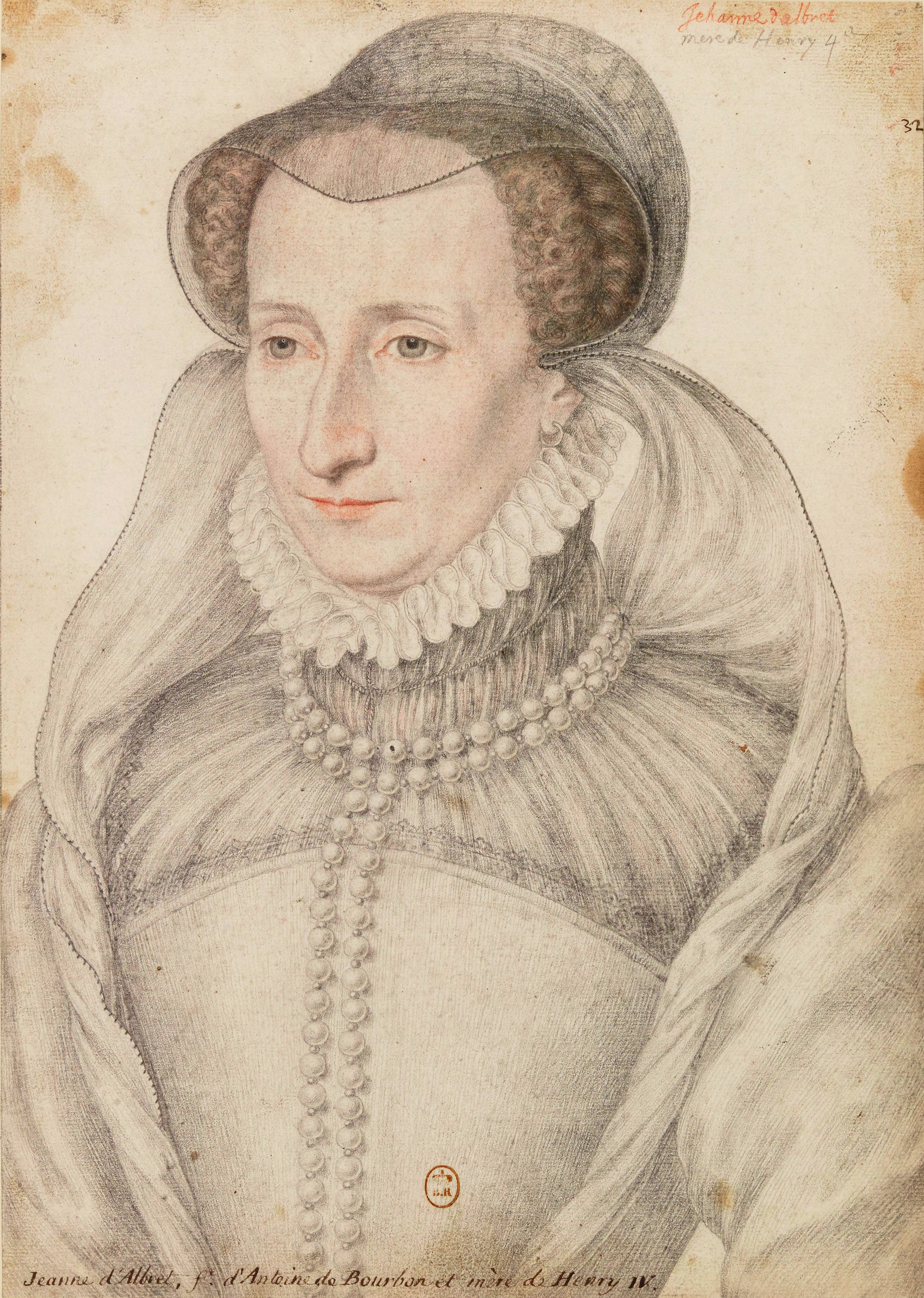
Jeanne d'Albret, queen of Navarre and one of the principal Protestant leaders of France in this period

Under the queen of Navarre, the sovereignty of Béarn from French encroachment, and the status of the vicomté as a refuge for Protestantism became a single cause. The queen of Navarre associated Roman Catholicism with the meddling of foreign powers, so that she might rally the population to her on political grounds as much as religious.

During 1563, Jeanne worked with a committee of jurists to produce a code of justice. The styl de la justicy de la Reine Jehanne came into effect in March 1564. It was declared that this styl and all future legal acts would be written in Béarnais alone.

=== Protestant hopes ===
In January 1563, John Calvin (leader of the Calvinist confession of Protestantism) wrote to the queen of Navarre urging her forward in the establishment of Protestantism in her lands of Béarn. Freed of her late husband, she was to purge the land of idolatry. He recognised that were obstacles to this process (from her own advisers, as well as enemies like the lieutenant-general of Guyenne, the seigneur de Monluc), and that it was not a simple overnight process.

Protestantism in Béarn had until this point an unorganised character. The queen of Navarre's minister, Merlin, would change this. Over the course of several synods, he instituted Calvinist structures in the vicomté.

In the meeting of the Béarnaise Estates of September 1565, protest was made against the obligation they were under to provide lodgings for Protestant ministers. Further protest was made against the requirements of teachers possessing certificates of Protestant orthodoxy.

The Catholic clergy refused to attend the Béarn estates of May 1566.

=== Spanish mission ===
In late July, the Spanish agent Juan Martinez Descurra, who had been working out of Pamplona, was sent into Béarn so that he might talk with the Protestant noble, the seigneur d'Audaux in the hopes of increasing pressure on Jeanne. Learning that he had arrived in Béarn, Jeanne insisted he meet first with her. Descurra reported on his interviews with the queen of Navarre back to Spain by letter of 14 August. He explained how in arriving in Lescar on 2 August the churches were in ruins, and that in Pau she had orchestrated the burning of statues and crucifixes, with orders that Mass was forbidden on pain of death. Ecclesiastical property had also been ordered confiscated in his telling. He claimed the queen of Navarre personally supervised this process and had informed him she wished to replicate it across Béarn.

=== Oloron ===
The queen of Navarre had mobilised six companies of soldiers (around 2,000 men) to bring about her policy. Descurra recorded an argument between the queen of Navarre and the Catholic governor of Oloron concerning the soldiers. Jeanne wished for all the soldiers to be Protestants, to which the governor is to have rejoindered that across Béarn there were not a thousand Protestants, and in his companies, not fifty.

In the place of Oloron, the Protestant pastor Merlin instigated the rebellion of the canons of the cathedral. These canons occupied the cathedral in December 1563.

== Saintonge and the Angoumois ==
South of the river Vendée down to Saintonge, skirmishes took place between Protestants and Catholics.

Christin describes the continued existence of Catholicism in Saintonge in the post-war years as a semi-clandestine thing. A syndic of the clergy of Saintes would, in 1564, list ninety-five parishes at which the Catholic religion was not practiced, and the benefice holders dare not reside for their safety.

=== Islands ===
Catholic worship was suppressed on the islands of Saintonge. The parlement of Bordeaux had ordered the overlord of Marennes to imprison the Protestant ministers that preached on the island.

=== Commissioners ===
The commissioners for Poitou, Aunis, and Saintonge, arrived in the province in October. At Saintes, they rebuffed the Protestant attempt to secure a supplementary site of worship in the suburbs of the city. The Protestants argued that Saintes was part of a separate jurisdiction to Saint-Jean-d'Angély, the allocated site of their worship. The Catholics disagreed. Regardless, the Protestants would continue their worship there during the commissioners stay in the city. The commissioners observed that in the countryside around Saintes, and particularly in the Îles de Marennes, the Protestants conducted illegal services and suppressed Catholic worship. The nobility also refused to return the ecclesiastical property they had seized or abide by the terms of the edict of Amboise. The judiciary of Saintes would not depart from the city to confront this defiance, and the commissioners were thus powerless to resolve matters.

At Saint-Jean-d'Angély, the commissioners were frustrated in their desire to pursue the case of a murdered noble, as the seigneur de Burie refused them military protection or aid, which they felt necessary to protect their lives in such an investigation. Thus, they departed for Aulnay. Burie would dispatch two parlementaires to handle Saint-Jean-d'Angély.

The first of the religiously neutral parlementaire chambers would be established in Saintonge (alongside another in Périgord) in May 1565 in the hopes of taming the religious situation in the province.

=== Angoumois ===
A Catholic notary observed forlornly after the peace that around the principality of Chalais, Easter services were not being held in fifty or sixty parishes. Mass was no longer spoken.

== Limousin and the Auvergne ==
The lieutenant-general and seneschal of Limousin, the comte d'Escars enjoyed the rays of royal favour during this period. Upon the death of Antoine de Noailles, he was invested further with the government of Bordeaux and the nearby Château du Hâ. His company of men-at-arms, which had been dissolved for monetary reasons was re-established on 12 February 1565. He embodied the policies of the chancellor L'Hôpital.

=== Royal grants ===
The inter-war years saw a flurry of royal activity in relation to the municipal liberties of the towns of the Limousin. Both Limoges and Saint-Yrieix were beneficiaries of this process during the Grand Tour of the kingdom. On 7 September 1566, a further grant was made to the city of Tulle, affording the place a mayor and consulate. A mayor and four consuls were to be elected by the people of Tulle every year. By these measures, Charles positioned himself against the ecclesiastical seigneurs of these places as a defender of urban liberty.

In a more economic development, the town of Felletin was granted a merchant's exchange on 19 May 1567.

By contrast, Charles avoided meddling with the towns of lower Limousin, which were dominated by the great seigneurs, the vicomte de Turenne (who was still Catholic in 1566) and the comte de Ventadour. Similarly, those along the river Vienne, under the authority of the bishop of Limoges were also felt to be unwise to challenge, the bishop being particularly well connected. The bishop of Tulle by contrast lacked such connections.

The Protestants enjoyed strength in Beaulieu, Argentat and Treignac. This was a further cause for royal preference towards the more Catholic dominated Saint-Yrieix, Bellac and Felletin.

The establishment of a consulate and other civic institutions did not necessarily guarantee the loyalty of a city to the crown. Therefore, it was decreed that the elections would take place in the presence of a royal magistrate, and the election winners would swear an oath before a royal official.

=== Limoges ===
The consulate of Limoges would remain with the Catholics. The Protestants of Limoges protested to the governor of the city, the seigneur de Montréal that they were being unfairly subject to a tax of 6,000 livres by the consulate of Limoges.

The queen of Navarre, in her capacity as vicomtesse de Limoges appealed against the municipal liberties that Charles had granted the city during his grand tour of the kingdom. This lawsuit did not work out to the advantage of the Protestants of Limoges.

The city of Limoges sent several delegations to treat with the queen of Navarre. She yielded to their request for the right to raise arms and made financial concessions. But she held firm to her rights of high justice over the territory. This conflict of prerogatives fell on religious lines, with the Catholics largely constituting the opposition to her control, and the loyalists being more Protestant.

=== Catholic League ===
In the Limousin, Catholic organisation brought together people of all Estates during 1567. It was on 3 May 1567 that a confrérie de Sainte-Croix (confraternity of the holy cross) was established in Limoges. Its members presented themselves as new crusaders, with a cross emblazoned on their hats. On 1 May a tree was planted before the house of the first member of the order. This tree had the advantage of avoiding the iconoclastic retaliation other symbols might induce. The historian Cassan affirms that the tree was a representation of militant Catholicism, and that as long as it stood Catholicism could be considered to reign in Limoges. 2 May was selected as the feast day of the Sainte-Croix. The goal of this organisation, according to a contemporary annalist, was to frustrate the Protestants. The tradition of the maypole was integrated into the confraternities practice, as it was a popular tradition.

=== Auvergne ===
A certain denizen of Clermont who failed to decorate his house front properly for the procession of the Holy Sacrament, which was to pass under his window, was burned.

== Aunis ==
=== La Rochelle ===
The city of La Rochelle had remained neutral during the first civil war, the attempted Protestant coup in the city having collapsed.

==== Election of 1563 ====
The election of Spring 1563 would be a hotly contested one, and religiously charged. Three factions were to be found: the city's remaining Catholics, working to avoid ruin or death; the moderate Protestants of the politiques et royaux bloc that wished to reconcile religious freedom of conscience with their submission to king Charles; and the militant Protestants of the zèles faction, who wished to pursue the advancement of Protestantism, whatever the consequences. The Catholics maintained contacts with the moderate Protestants.

The zèles candidate for mayor was a certain Jean Pierres, the lieutenant-civil and criminal of the présidial court (mid-ranking court between the level of the bailliage and the parlements). The moderate Protestants however held a majority on the town council and were able to produce a slate of three finalists for the position of mayor that excluded Pierres, with the support of the Catholics. It was reported that one of the Protestant candidates supported consistories and synods, while another opposed them as being in defiance of royal authority.

Of these men, the alderman Michel Guy, who collected the taille (land tax) in La Rochelle, enjoyed the support of the prominent Catholics. Seeing him as the biggest threat of winning the election, the zèles vigorously opposed Guy, charging him with possessing a conflict of interest thanks to his responsibilities relating to the tax rolls. This dispute would be referred to the parlement of Paris. Before any judgement could be rendered, Guy was elected mayor and hastily sworn into office by a certain ardent royalist of the présidial court: Blandin, a man suspected by the Protestants of being a crypto-Catholic.

Pierres' partisans alleged official discrimination against their candidate. They succeeded in securing the second most senior member of the présidial court to proclaim Pierres the counter-mayor of La Rochelle at least until such time as Guy's eligibility could be resolved. The next few weeks saw both men acting as if they were the sole legitimate authority, causing chaos in La Rochelle. The council was ground to a halt by the partisans of both sides.

On the houses of the politiques and zèles Bible verses could be found displayed, justifying their party affiliation. It was only with the arrival of royal letters patent affirming Guy's rights to the mayoralty that Pierres was forced to withdraw. Keen to ensure no future episodes like this, king Charles declared that Guy would enjoy the office until such time as royal assent was provided to resume elections. This was a blow to the moderate town councillors, who resented royal interference in their local administration.

Come August 1563, Blandin was the chief deputy for La Rochelle of the governor of Aunis, the baron de Jarnac.

==== Commissioner visit ====
The royal commissioners for Saintonge, Poitou, and Aunis were to be found in La Rochelle on 17 September 1563. They highlighted the partisan nature of local officials, and the fissure between the loyalist and radical Protestants. In their opinion there were many faithful servants of the crown to be found. These men were scandalised by zealous officials of both the Protestant and Catholic creeds, as their passions brought about injustice. The commissioners were subject to 'unsubstantiated allegations'.

==== Electoral frustration ====
Writing to Charles and Catherine by letter of 15 May 1564, the baron de Jarnac reported that a large delegation of the town council was pressing him to determine when exactly elections would be permitted to resume.

As Guy's tenure extended on into 1565, the militant populace complained of the degradation of their civic institutions. Those councillors sympathetic to the zèles cause demanded Guy publicly show all the documents relating to his regime. When he refused, they boycotted the council, hoping to deny him quorum. New letters patent came from the crown permitting the council to conduct policy on the basis of a majority of present councillors. This proved grounds for more complaints about the erosion of the local political administration.

==== Guy's regime ====
Guy oversaw the reorganisation and arming of the militia of La Rochelle. He instructed loyal fiscal officials to speak with their Parisian colleagues, advertising the improvements in security while also making requests for new tax exemptions for the Rochelais. This occasioned rebuke from the baron de Jarnac in September 1564, who saw them as encroaching on his own powers, as well as liable to see the crown seize all municipal revenues to establish a citadel and garrison in the city. Such a state of affairs was also not in Jarnac's interest, as his authority over La Rochelle would be diluted by such an influx of royal agents. Facing this reprimand, Guy's credibility deteriorated.

Around August 1564, the Protestants gained a new pastor in La Rochelle, a certain Odet de Nort. Odet decried the French crown for abrogating their previous peace pledges (as with the edict of Roussillon from that very month). He was joined in his denunciations by the other Protestant pastors of La Rochelle, who called on their congregations to see Charles, and those around him as enemies of the faith.

==== King's visit ====
On the occasion of the royal visit to La Rochelle in 1565, Charles, steeled by the negative reports he had received from the baron de Jarnac, issued a series of decrees hostile to the zèles faction. The corps de ville was cut down in size from one hundred to twenty-four members, Jarnac was afforded the right to choose the mayor of La Rochelle from among the three candidates presented to him by the town councillors. The cities cannons were to be handed over to Jarnac to store in the great towers of the city. Jarnac was to be promptly obeyed, and his most hardcore opponents: such as Pierres, several aldermen, and the pastor Nicolas Folion were ordered to leave La Rochelle permanently. Protestant worship was also suspended for the duration of the royal visit. These repression measures backfired, bringing more support to those pastors who had advocated armed resistance to the crown, clearly the crown was hostile to their civic institutions as well as the Protestant faith.

Protestant worship resumed on the royal departure, and Jarnac, who remained in the city, was subject to death threats. The governor only left his home when accompanied by twenty bodyguards. Fearful, Jarnac wrote to the court begging them not to reduce the gendarmerie presence in the area. He further begged Catherine to deliver on her promise to see his garrison funding augmented, threatening the alternative of retiring to his estates. The population of the city for Jarnac was now an object of suspicion and fear.

The Rochelais took the lead on reversing the royal measures of the visit. A lobbying campaign of the crown was begun, arguing that Jarnac's garrison was a financial burden, and that if their institutions were restored to their prelapsarian state, they would shoulder the financial burdens of urban defence. The councillors swore to guard La Rochelle for the king. Robbins suspects a cash bribe was also involved in the subsequent royal reverse.

==== Jarnac's disgrace ====
Charles was at this point chiefly interested in the fiscal pledges. On 1 January 1566 he sent Jarnac a curt dispatch. With immediate effect, Jarnac was to disband the fifty musketeers that constituted his garrison and bodyguard. Their pay was stopped from the date of the letter, with nothing provided for the royal coffers to cover the span between the dispatch of the letter and its receipt. Jarnac was to vacate La Rochelle and turn over the towers, artillery and arsenal to the mayor. The full corps de ville was re-established, and the exiles, with the exception of the pastor Folion, permitted to return to the city. Jarnac reacted against these orders, for months petitioning the French crown. On 19 January 1566 he bid Charles remember the history the Rochelais had of rebellion over the past hundreds of years. A few weeks further he reached out to his court patron (the comte de Chaulnes) to get Charles to back down from his letter of 1 January. He saw a dark future for La Rochelle with his authority stripped, La Rochelle being filled with the seditious, again reciting the history the Rochelais had of various rebellions. He refused to yield the towers under his control.

It was only when the lieutenant-general of Poitou came down to La Rochelle in March to express the royal orders directly to Jarnac in person, that the governor relented and quit the city. He retired to his château where he sulked about his unjust treatment, continuing to petition for payment of his garrison expenses. He further gave warning that his enemies on the town council were looking to engineer the election of Blandin to the office of mayor of La Rochelle. Though Blandin had the reputation of a moderate that might appeal to the crown, his unpopularity in the city would force him to make concessions to those who had brought about his election. Further, by royal edict, Blandin, as a judge, should be prohibited from assuming the office.

Charles ignored Jarnac and affirmed the appointment of Blandin as mayor. Robbins suspects the election of a moderate like Blandin, over the edicts prohibiting it, might have formed part of the Rochelais promise to Charles in return for the restoration of their civic institutions.

==== Blandin's regime ====
Blandin quickly moved to implement the ordinance of Moulins, by which cognisance of civil cases was moved from municipal tribunals to the officers of royal justice. This self-aggrandising move favoured Blandin, as président (a chief judge) of the présidial court, at the expense of the Protestant dominated civic tribunal. Blandin was opened up for criticism in and out of the corps de ville. Even the moderate Protestants on the council turned against Blandin over the affair. In an alliance between the politiques and zèles it was resolved to freeze Blandin out of the next mayoral race, denying him the possibility to pick his own successor.

With the field thus opened, one candidate emerged who could prove acceptable to all camps, a certain François Pontard, who was close to Jean Pierres. Pontard played up his father's connections with Jarnac's predecessor, and hinted at his desire to maintain good relations with the local royal lieutenant. By this means, Pontard secured election as mayor.

== Poitou ==
The governor of Poitou, the comte de Lude seized control of the benefices in the government of Poitou that were in the hands of the Protestants. In the hopes of combatting the Catholic inclinations of the comte de Lude, Catherine sent her confident, the seigneur de Biron to the province.

The Catholics of Poitou showed themselves unwilling on many occasions to honour the peace of Amboise. The comte de Lude received several letters ordering him to release wartime prisoners.

The Poitevan nobility, proving itself restless, looked to take up arms in 1564.

Across Bas-Poitou (Lower Poitou) Protestant ranks closed during the period of peace. The funeral of the Protestant seigneur de Soubise on 2 September 1566, was the occasion for a gathering of several hundred nobles to offer their services to the late Soubise's wife Antoinette.

In 1567, parlementaires were sent out into Poitou to support with local criminal cases that were ongoing.

=== Commissioners ===
Pierre de Masparrault and René de Bourgneuf were entrusted as the crown's commissioners for the provinces of Poitou, Saintonge and Aunis in the summer of 1563. In August, they wrote to the chancellor L'Hôpital about how they had started with eight days at Châtellerault, where they had been surprised by the workload. Châtellerault had been assigned as the site of Protestant worship for the local area. They complained that the inhabitants of the city had not disarmed, and the slow wheels of local justice. The governor of the city would later defend himself before the French court. The commissioners would ultimately permit two sites for Châtellerault.

Arriving at Saint-Maixent twelve days later, the commissioners complained to Catherine about how both Protestants and Catholics looked to exploit them towards the ends of partisan grievances. The behaviour of the comte de Lude came in for complement from the commissioners for his 'even-handed' approach.

By the end of August, the commissioners were in Fontenay-Le-Comte, from where they reported that the Catholics were absent the enjoyment of the edict, and their clergy were in hiding out of fear. They requested that de Lude be empowered to intervene militarily.

In November, the commissioners had returned to Saint-Maixent and were pleased to see the crown had granted the request they and the comte de Lude had made. This done, it would now be possible to implement the edict of Amboise.

From Poitiers on 12 November, the royal regulations on the edict's terms were published by the commissioners. These spelled out the sites of Protestant worship. Masparrault would deliver his summative report for their commission before the conseil privé on 24 November. It was soon apparent though that the religious situation in Saintonge remained unresolved.

=== Poitiers ===
Dispute arose as to whether Protestant worship was to be permitted inside Poitiers itself.

The Protestants complained that the site they had been offered was not suitable, with suitable meaning that they could attend and return from the site in a morning. Due to Poitiers' revolt during the first civil war, Charles would delay the acknowledgment of the city's privileges until 1574.

In March 1564, a certain Jean Poncher was sent as a commissioner to the specific city of Poitiers.

=== Other places ===
In parts of the Vendée, where Protestantism was in the ascendency, such as Mouchamps and Pouzauges, the edict of Amboise did not bring about the return of Catholicism.

== Brittany ==
There was reluctance in Brittany to receive the edict of Amboise. Come the end of summer 1563, the edict had been registered in the province and was generally enforced.

The clergy and council of Nantes remonstrated with the crown against the implementation of the edict of Amboise.

=== Governors of Brittany ===
With the coming of peace, the governor of Brittany, the duc d'Étampes, moved to see the population disarmed. The population of Rennes were to hand in their weapons, with the exception of daggers and swords which might be maintained by the populace for the game of Popinjay. The weapons of Nantes were to be inventoried in the maison de la ville (town hall). By September 1563, he was able to proudly report that the population, particularly that of Rennes and Nantes, had been disarmed. He noted that it was not possible to disarm the populace without himself possessing armed strength. Further, those inhabitants within two leagues of the sea were permitted to maintain arms so that they might possess defence against the English.

Étampes complained to a certain Protestant seigneur de Vieillevigne in July 1563 concerning the Protestant looting of land belonging to a convent, carrying off the fodder that belonged to the nuns.

The governor was full of praise for the two commissioners he had been assigned in November 1563. On their departure he wrote warmly on their conduct to Catherine.

Come August 1564, Étampes complained to Charles that the Protestant's had begun to assault members of the Catholic clergy, defile the Mass, and engage in acts of iconoclasm. He felt that the justice system was too lenient in these affairs and could use some more rigour.

The edict of Amboise was not well applied in Brittany and was beginning to test Étampes' patience. In October 1564, the governor complained to the crown that with his hands tied he was not able to fully implement the royal will.

Étampes requested further commissioners be sent to Brittany, and the crown complied in December 1564, offering him as biased Catholics as they could find, so that he could achieve his end goals. By the time these commissioners arrived, six months later, Étampes was dead. The new commissioners would instead collaborate with the vicomte de Martigues, who had been elevated to the position of governor after the death of his uncle Étampes. The sending of new commissioners was an admission of failure at the pacification efforts of the prior cohort.

A resident governor in this period, Martigues made his entry into Nantes, where he enjoyed a magnificent celebration from the bourgeois of the city. The city's new militia paraded for his entry. In June 1565 he made moves against the Protestants of the province when he forbade them to open schools, sing psalms or undertake baptisms in ways outside those prescribed by the edict of Amboise.

=== Sites of worship ===
==== Étampes compromise ====
The two commissioners for Brittany were Pierre de Chanteclerc and Étienne Lallement. They arrived in the province in August 1563, presenting themselves before the parlement of Rennes. By the terms of the edict of Amboise a place of Protestant worship in the suburbs was to be put in place for every bailliage and sénéchaussée (bailiwick and seneschalship, judicial administrative divisions). Due to the large and irregular nature of these courts in Brittany, the duc d'Étampes, governor of Brittany, had personally presented the king a list of places that would need a Protestant site of worship in their suburbs. These were Nantes, Le Croisic, Hennebont, Morlaix, Lannion, Ploërmel, and Dinan. Rennes would not enjoy a place of worship in its suburbs, as Étampes instructed his subordinate, the lieutenant-general the sieur de Bouillé to establish the Protestant place of worship far from the city. This was justified on the grounds that the king did not want Protestant worship in Rennes.

No sooner had Étampes returned to Brittany than he moved to terminate Protestant worship at the Rohan stronghold of Blain.

The Protestants of Brittany would complain around the end of September about the paucity of places that had been granted to them, and several cases of grants that had proved contentious. The historian Rivault notes that the only grant that went smoothly was that of Ploërmel. Étampes explained that the more restricted plan of eight sénéchaussée that he had drawn up was something he had done in collaboration with the Protestant seigneur d'Andelot, alongside other Protestants. Without royal charge, the edict of Amboise could not be modified, and thus the number of Protestant temples was not up for debate. Nevertheless, they could hear petitions and potentially make adjustments based on such complaints.

To the Protestants of Le Croisic, Étampes noted that places of Protestant worship could not be established in ports due to the war with England. The sieur de Baullac attempted to push the matter on behalf of the Protestants, arguing that they would cause no seditions if they had this site of worship. Étampes would not brook this and proposed that the Protestants of Le Croisic instead accept Guérande or La Roche-Bernard for the site of their worship. The Protestants of Le Croisic rejected Étampes' proposal, little desiring to travel to another town for their worship during winter. Their persistence caused Étampes to refer the matter to the king. In the meanwhile, they would have to worship in Le Croisic quietly without a church.

At both Lannion and Morlaix, the commissioners determined that there were too few Protestants in the places to make the establishment of a Protestant church worthwhile. To soften the blow of failing to establish Protestant worship at either of these places, the commissioners and Étampes showed themselves more sympathetic to the Protestant demands concerning Concarneau. Here they permitted Protestant worship in the house of a certain de Baullac a little way out from the walls of the town. Concarneau had not been named as a place of Protestant worship by the edict of Amboise, but the total sites of worship were maintained below the total of eight that had been given.

Facing resistance from the government of Dinan to the establishment of Protestant worship in their suburbs, on the grounds of being a frontier garrison town, the commissioners instead chose a site a half league away from the suburbs.

The Protestants of Vannes and Muzillac had requested sites of worship from the parlement, and the commissioners deferred making a decision until a royal ordinance on the matter was delivered. Ultimately, they rejected Vannes demands on the grounds that it was the fief of a bishop (though this was also true of Nantes) and that the king had chosen Hennebont. The sieur de Botvéruc again made the case for Vannes before the commissioners arguing it could accommodate those Protestants who had left Lannion and Morlaix. While a site in Vannes would again be rejected, the authorities did relent to a degree. A house a half league from Vannes was designated pending a decision from the king, and Muzillac was permitted to host a Protestant temple. This was in return for acceptance of the lack of places in Lannion and Morlaix.

Ultimately the list of eight concluded at Amboise would be adapted by the commissioners as they negotiated the situation on the ground in Brittany. In the end the places of worship would be Liffré and Hédé (two places nearby Rennes), Muzillac, Ploërmel, Nantes, a place near Dinan, a place near Vannes, and de Baillac's house near Concarneau. The governor and his subordinates were in a position of strength in these negotiations.

==== Rennes ====
The religious situation in Nantes and Rennes was thornier than in the smaller communities and therefore required more arbitration from the government. Thus, in the justification of 1 October, the choice of Liffré and Hédé was explained to the Protestants of Rennes as resulting from Rennes being a city of the parlement. Lallemant and Chanteclerg reported to Étampes on 12 October that the Protestants had objected to the choice of Liffré on the grounds of it being inconvenient. Accepting the merit of the Protestant objection to Liffré, a search was undertaken by the commissioners for a new location, with the men settling on a place in the village of Saint-Grégoire, a league from the city. This proposal was sent to Étampes, as was a Catholic objection to the proposal. Étampes referred the matter to royal council. Étampes was empowered by the royal council to maintain Liffré and Hédé, which were three leagues from Rennes, as opposed to Saint-Grégoire, which was only a single league away. By its referral to royal council, Étampes cloaked his original proposal in royal legitimacy. The Catholics were satisfied by this; the Protestants were not.

A year later, the Protestants of Rennes invoked the matter again to the commissioners who raised it with Étampes. Étampes complained to the queen mother Catherine that the Protestants were being difficult and only looking for excuses to be disgruntled.

==== Nantes ====
In Nantes the situation was the most challenging. The attitudes of the bourgeois of the city had been hardened by the experience of the first civil war. The Protestants hoped to re-establish their worship, in the places of La Gâcherie and Barbin, which were fiefs of Protestant nobles. In their 1 October notice, Étampes and his lieutenant-generals recalled the opposition of the bishop of Nantes and clergy to the terms, and the fact the matter had been referred to royal council. While a royal decision was awaited, Étampes allocated four nearby locations to serve as the sites of worship (Blain, Nort, Bouguenais, and Aigrefeuille). It was preferable for the governor that the worship be distributed across several small rural sites rather than concentrated in a single place in the suburbs of Nantes. Rivault credits this rather to the presence of the plague in Nantes at this time. The Protestants of Nantes were resistant to this proposal, preferring to maintain their church in the city. Drawn out negotiations would follow, that would not be settled until 5 February 1564. So that the matter was not continually referred back to the king, Étampes heard many of the petitions in sequence. The Protestants attempted to secure the site of La Saulzaye, but the Catholics rejected this as it was not a suburb but rather a boulevard that adjoined one of the gates. The commissioners were warned of the troubles of allowing Protestant worship near the city gates, as it would disrupt trade.

The Protestants then proposed the house of a certain La Fosse, but the Catholics rejected this on the grounds that it was on church land. Nantes was, as they put it, a frontier town, and thus the interests of military security needed to be considered. A Protestant church on the port would also complicate trade with Spain. The various other suburbs of Nantes were eliminated on various pretexts. The Catholics then made their proposals. They proposed the Pressoir, this was rejected by the Protestant's as it had only recently been burned down. They then proposed a suburb of Guérande, which was viewed dimly by the Protestant's due to its great distance from Nantes.

The Protestants then appeared before Étampes bearing royal letters that allowed them to have a site of worship located on the bishop's lands. On the basis of this letter, and with no compromise proposal forthcoming, Étampes resolved to assign the Protestant's the house of the Protestant Beauregard in the suburb of Marchix. Étampes explained the process of the negotiations to Charles in a letter of 13 February.

This inspired the objections of both the bishop's men and the cathedral chapter. The Catholics were further displeased that the Protestants were coming to live in the city proper rather than one of its suburbs. The governor of Nantes, Sanzay complained similarly that while the Protestants had a place of worship in the suburbs they were to be found residing in Nantes. The Catholic opposition redoubled their complaints in May 1564, noting that the people of Nantes rejected the instillation of the Protestants at Beauregard. At Beauregard, the Protestants would gain control of the nearby bridges through worship there. A new objection they raised was that the Protestants did not confine their preaching to Beauregard but provocatively violated the edict by preaching in other nearby houses.

Come April 1565, the Protestants of Nantes felt the need to request a second pastor be dispatched to them from Geneva.

In early 1566, the Protestants of Nantes were compelled to move their church to the lands of the seigneur de La Muce at La Gâcherie. Worship still continued, with the church enjoying two pastors by this time and celebrating thirty-five marriages.

In October 1565 the Protestants of Brittany requested the allocation of more sites. The crown retorted that they already had eight, and thus it was hard to select more.

=== Nantes ===
==== Marginalisation of the Protestants ====
In Nantes, the edict of Amboise was greeted with hostility, and this hostility was reinforced by the more restrictive interpretative declarations to the edict that came from the crown subsequently. The Protestants of Nantes were disarmed. For the Catholics, the goal was to see the Protestants marginalised: geographically, politically, and legally.

Étampes' declaration of October 1563 also covered the subject of Protestant burials. The commissioners had requested that Catholic cemeteries have sections put aside for the Protestants, and that in the suburbs the Protestants enjoy their own cemeteries. The Catholics of the parish of Saint-Léonard-de-Nantes complained that the Protestant's wanted to expand into other parts of their cemetery. Protestants of high noble stock wanted to be buried in their family crypts, even when the church itself was Catholic. The commissioners avoided ruling on this point, referring it instead to the king for judgement.

Protestants, who had been allowed to return by the edict were subject to harassment and imprisonment. In the Corpus Christi day celebration of 1564, five Protestant notables were arrested for refusing to decorate their houses with tapestries for the procession of the Host. The parlement of Rennes was slow in coming to the aid of Protestants. Charles would later, in October, order the release of the men, as well as their reimbursement for the fine they had paid. It was only by a decision of 30 March 1565 that letters patent were registered in the parlement of Rennes by which Protestants were affirmed in their right to absent their households from participation in the Corpus Christi day processions. If such decoration was viewed as necessary, it was to come at the expense of the church

New Nantais objections arose in 1564 to Protestant establishment of a school in Nantes, as well as the presence of 'foreigners' in the Beauregard sermons. There was a risk of Beauregard becoming a second Geneva in their view. The Protestant La Musse, aware of the Catholic manoeuvres intervened directly with Étampes to quash this objection. He noted that the Protestants had never thought to establish public schools, but it was only natural that they would hire Protestant tutors for their households to bring up their young.

Further Catholic Nantais discrimination against their Protestant community was to be found in the amending of the rules of the city's company of merchants, such that non-Catholics could not be admitted.

==== Economic developments ====
In April 1564, a consulate of merchants was created for Nantes, following on from that which had been established for Paris the preceding November. Each year a judge and two consuls would be elected, with the goal of this institution being a better regulation of trade.

Nantes became an incorporated municipality in 1564-1565, which afforded the government of the city greater power to wield against the Protestants. This granted the city the right to annually elect a mayor and ten aldermen. The mayor and aldermen had responsibility for the city watch, oversaw finance and the sale of goods, and organisation of poor relief. These men would execute the policy resolved upon by the general assembly, which was in theory open to all heads of household. In practice, the grandees and officers debated while others looked on. On 28 November 1564, the city elected its first mayor, a certain Geoffrey Drouot. Over the coming years, the choices of mayor by Nantes would be fairly equally divided between wealth merchants and royal officers of the city courts.

The prévôt (provost) of Nantes objected to this incorporation. This office had previously enjoyed jurisdiction over economic and police matters in Nantes. Another dispute, that between the municipality and the chambres des comptes (chamber of accounts) was settled in favour of the court by the king. By this means, Charles afforded the chambres des comptes permission to audit the accounts of the municipality, and its receipts of the octrois (excise tax on goods entering the city). While the mayor objected and stalled, in 1567 he was forced to concede access to the archives to the royal commissioner dispatched for the purpose.

On 15 December 1564, a decree was issued concerning the defence of Nantes, a responsibility the new municipality assumed control over. A military structure was to be recreated in each parish, consisting of captains, cinquantaniers and dizainiers. Officers would take note of the comings and goings at inns. Disturbances in neighbourhoods were to be reported up to the militia officers. While in theory the captains were to be elected by their companies, in practice, the captains were city notables, rich merchants, or local royal officers, who were appointed to the postings.

The finances of the city were in relatively good health during these years; the debt of the city having been reduced to 34,600 livres by 1565. That year, a loan of 10,000 livres was raised off eight individuals. Such loans were repaid through the revenues of the octrois. The city would then be permitted in 1566 to raise an extra octrois, as well as a tax of 10,000 livres on the people of Nantes over a period of two years to deal with its debts.

In summarising the period 1563–1567 in Nantes, Tingle argues that the Catholics recognised they could not eliminate Protestantism in the city and thus resolved to enforce the most restrictive interpretation of the royal edicts as possible.

=== Protestant activities in Brittany ===
In October 1563, the Protestant comte de Montgommery kidnapped the du Chastel heiress (a daughter of the late lieutenant-general Claude du Chastel) from the house of d'Acigny with the support of du Chastel's maternal Protestant relatives (the Acigny). The heiress had been betrothed to a Rieux match in 1560, but the Protestant Acigny rejected the validity of this marriage. The plan was to have her marry the son of the prince de Condé. The paternal relatives of du Chastel, the Rieux family, objected. Étampes took the side of the Rieux and made an appeal to the maréchal de Brissac and the queen mother Catherine. Catherine secured the release of the heiress from the prince de Condé's household.

Around the end of February 1564, the Protestants held their first provincial Breton synod.

== Maine ==
The royal commissioners for the province of Maine were Arnoul Boucher and Jean de Lavau. They found themselves faced with a heavy workload. Both Protestants and Catholics wanted vengeance for wrongs they had suffered, even though the official royal policy was to forgive and forget the crimes of the civil war.

The Protestant nobles of Maine on the other hand remonstrated with the king and the maréchal de Vielleville concerning the failure of the commissioners to provide succour for their grievances. The presence of the commissioner Myron, who had previously worked to pacify Lyon, and who had now come north to assist Vielleville in Maine, was condemned. In their estimation, Myron was less a Catholic zealot than a malicious judge. The more Protestant sympathetic Lavau also came in for reproach from the Protestant nobles.

In May 1565, the Protestants of Maine remonstrated with the king against their governor, arguing that he showed contempt for the pacification edict. The lieutenant-general Taron was accused of leading a band of armed thieves that looted the estates of Protestant noblemen. Protestants fleeing Le Mans were set upon by masked men. A catalogue of the various nobles and grandees who had been assassinated was compiled by the Protestants.

=== Catholic League ===
The sieur de La Mauvissière reported that Catholic Leagues sprang up from 1564 in Touraine, Anjou and Maine. The bishop of Le Mans is to have gone from manor house to manor house recruiting nobles to the Le Mans League.

Alongside the bishop of Le Mans in this organisation was to be found the governor of Le Mans, the seigneur de Chavigny, and the lieutenant-general Taron. Jouanna suggests that the discreet approval of the governor of Maine, the duc de Montpensier, was also given. This league terrorised the Protestants through attacks on their persons and property.

=== Le Mans ===
The new lieutenant-general of Maine, Anjou and Touraine, the seigneur de Chavigny, received the office of governor of Le Mans in 1564. The historian Christin describes the Protestants of Le Mans as being victim to ceaseless brutalities.

The Catholic clergy of Le Mans sent a list of ecclesiastical grievances to the commissioners.

== Anjou ==
In 1564, the seigneur de Chavigny was appointed lieutenant-general over the provinces of Anjou, Maine, and Touraine for the governor duc de Montpensier. Bourquin contrasts the character of Chavigny with Puygaillard, describing him as a man who could listen to all parties, and bring about a peaceable settlement. Puygaillard is described as a figure incapable of assuming a notable position in the region.

=== Angers ===
Though the seigneur de Puygaillard, governor of Angers, put himself at the head of an anti-Protestant alliance in 1562, his rhetoric did not manifest into reality. Thus, after February 1563, the Protestants of Angers were largely left to their own devices. Puygaillard was forced to adapt to the reality of the edict of Amboise.

The opportunity of the first French War of Religion would not be wasted by the seigneur de Puygaillard. Taxes for the maintenance of the city's ramparts and for the payment of royal troops were brought together into a single package. Thus, after peace had arrived in July 1563, a sum of 1,500 livres was raised from the citizens of Angers for the payment of the royal soldiers belonging to Puygaillard.

==== Site of worship ====
The commissioners sent out into the provinces to determine the sites of Protestant worship determined that Protestantism was weak in Anjou. Angers, though it housed a sizable Protestant minority, would not be afforded a designated place of worship in the surrounds of Angers as the community's size was insufficient. They proposed that in Anjou the only place the Protestants would receive would be a site in the suburbs of Baugé.

The Protestants of Angers little desired to adhere to these restrictions and continued to worship at the village of Cantenay, near Angers. Puygaillard, busy with other matters, did not come down against this illegal worship.

==== Preparations for the royal visit ====
The duc de Montpensier was full of praise for the peace in which Angers was being kept by its authorities in 1564.

A few months later, in July 1565, the maréchal de Vielleville arrived in Angers, along with two councillors (lower ranking judges) from the Bordeaux parlement (highest courts of appeal in the kingdom) who were serving as commissioners. Vielleville made preparations for the arrival of the French court in Anjou, and Puygaillard and Chavigny were tasked with cataloguing points of religious friction before the court arrived, resolving what they could.

To this end, the seigneur de Chavigny wrote to the aldermen of Angers in a friendly missive of 24 August, that contrasted sharply with the tone they frequently received from Puygaillard. In this inquiry, he asked of affairs in the city, noting that Vielleville, who had recently visited, had appraised him that he left the city in good order. Of particular concern for Chavigny was a recent riot that had transpired in Château-du-Loir. He suspected that the perpetrators (who had killed four-to-five people during a service, including the minister) might have taken refuge in Angers. Therefore, he hoped to see the aldermen apprehend the individuals, so that justice might be executed.

During the grand tour, a wide host of Angevin towns and cities would be the subject of royal visit, including the capital of the province, at which the court stayed only two days. The impression the court received was one of a pacified and peaceable Anjou.

Angers was not entirely religiously tranquil. In March 1566, an iconoclast destroyed the statue of Saint Francis at the porte des cordeliers.

As the spectre of a new civil war rose in 1567, a new tax was levied on those of Angers, targeting wine entering the city.

==== Catholic League ====
The Catholic League of Anjou was the work of the bishop of Angers after his return from the council of Trent. He formed the league in 1567 in conjunction with the governor of Angers, the seigneur de Puygaillard. The two men prepared an oath for the nobles of Anjou to swear to. They swore to support one another against Protestant rebels by all means up to killing them. Protestantism was considered to be a creed that was the enemy of Catholicism. To crush Protestantism, they would rally around the sovereign and fight a crusade for the king's holy edicts and to punish heretics. Indeed, the authority of the king was affirmed strongly in the terms of the oath. Fifty-nine nobles swore themselves to this league, included among whom the Daillon, the du Bellay, and the La Tour-Landry.

The historian Bourquin, describes the league as a moderate one, notes that those who swore up to it were showing two things: firstly, a hostility to Protestantism, secondly an apprehension about the current religious policy of moderation.

The involvement of Puygaillard in this project illustrates for Bourquin that despite his dexterity at handling relations with the municipality, Puygaillard was ill-suited for dealing with Catholic-Protestant relations. Thus, he would be replaced as governor of Anjou and Angers in October 1567 by a certain Vassé.

=== Other towns in Anjou ===
In March 1567, the Protestants converted a barn at the place of Châtillon, near Cantenay, to be a house of worship, despite the illegality of this move.

== Touraine ==
In provinces possessing particularly virulent Catholic governors, Catherine sought to combat them. In Touraine this meant the dispatch of the seigneur de Rhodes to the province.

=== Commissioners ===
The commissioners responsible for Touraine, Blois, Anjou and Maine, Arnoul Boucher and Jean de Lavau, were not appointed for the provinces in question until 18 October 1563. Boucher was a replacement for a certain François Briçonnet who had come down ill. Lavau had been accused of attending Protestant services during the first civil war. In opposition to him, Boucher was a strong Catholic. Gabriel Myron would also act as a commissioner for Touraine, though his conduct there is described as 'suspect' by Roberts, and he was subsequently dismissed.

=== Tours ===
==== Catholic regime ====
Though the municipal organs of Tours in theory boasted a membership north of one hundred, in practice only a rump attended meetings. From May to August 1563, no more than thirty attended a session, and sometimes as few as ten were present. Thus, civic control was in the hands of a Catholic band of magistrates. This group operated something between a reign of terror and campaign of pressure against the local Protestant population. This policy was justified to the governor of Touraine, the duc de Montpensier, on the grounds that the Protestants remained bellicose, in violation of the edict of Amboise, and liable to engage in new disorders. Quarterniers, who had been vetted as good Catholics, conducted house searches for weapons and suspicious characters. The mayor and aldermen stressed to Charles that appearances could be deceiving.

The Protestants remonstrated against their treatment. They were little enthused at the idea of seeing a mayor overstep the bounds of his policing authority, municipal guard should be composed of members of both religions. Further, levies imposed on Protestants should be revoked, with new taxes levied irrespective of religion. Protestants should be returned to their offices, and attacks upon them needed to cease.

Through the spring and summer of 1563, a plague ran rampant in Tours.

==== Site of Protestant worship ====
The Protestants of Tours hoped to establish their worship in the suburb of Saint-Symphorien outside Tours. The inhabitants of this place refused to accept a Protestant church in their midst. Objections were raised that the site was too strategic, allowing them dominion over the rivers (the Loire and Cher), and thus the region. The site was therefore changed to the village of Saint-Avertin. The Protestants of Tours rejected this site due to its great distance from Tours, across the river Cher and marshes. The Protestants had also, during the first civil war, looted the abbey church of Saint-Martin, making the place enemy territory.

The Protestants hoped for Saint-Symphorien, and the right to sing psalms in their own homes. The seigneur de Chavigny was entrusted with finding a place acceptable to both the Protestants and Catholics. Finally, the village of Maillé was chosen, over the objections of its clergy. The seigneur de Maillé offered his château for the Protestants, and it would prove to be an important refuge place for the religion during the 1560s.

The proximity of Maillé to Tours was also a problem for the Catholics, viewing the place as a staging ground for an attack against the city, and thus they appealed to Montpensier. Montpensier explained that they would have to bear with it until he could bring the site to the attention of the king. In July 1564, the Catholics were obliged to accept Maillé as a site of Protestant worship, and worship there was inaugurated in September 1564. Two hundred Protestants made the trip to Maillé, braving menacing by bands of Catholics along the route out of Tours. The event was accompanied by skirmishes, and accusations that the Protestants had stormed the parish church of Maillé, cut the rope to the bell, and chased out the priests during a funeral service.

Chavigny quibbled with the notion of Protestant seigneurs' lands being used for their worship, arguing that Protestant seigneurs could only accommodate their subjects and family at worship they held, and that bourgeois of Tours should not therefore be permitted to attend these services. As he saw it, the only site of worship the Protestants enjoyed in the bailliage of Touraine was Langeais. His understanding that only the subjects of a Protestant seigneur could attend such worship was not stated in the edict.

The municipality also took issue with Protestant worship in nearby châteaux and villages, observing that the Protestants being armed for their protection to attend worship in these places was a threat to the city. In a related issue, Protestants complained that their dead were being dug up at night and thrown into cesspits. Thus, the Protestants attained a garden outside the city walls to bury their dead, but they were prevented from using it. The municipality argued the garden was on ecclesiastical land and thus inappropriate. Further, the Protestants had not paid the rent or indemnity required for its usage. The Protestants ignored these objections and continued to use the garden, however funerals were often interrupted and devolved into fights, and the garden walls were demolished one night.

==== Confrontation ====
In October 1563, several Catholics visited Maillé on personal business. There, they were set upon by a host of seven or eight armed men who judged them to be involved in the massacre of Protestants that had taken place in Tours in August 1562. The injured Catholics denied that they were noyeurs (as the August 1562 massacre had involved drownings).

In Tours proper, the seigneur de Chavigny introduced a small garrison. A curfew was also imposed, and regulations on vagrants and foreigners enacted. Chavigny shared the priority of the town council in ensuring Protestant worship was kept out of the city of Tours and its faubourgs.

The rump Catholic council attempted to stop the return of Protestant officers to their charges. Appeals were made to the parlement of Paris, and the king on this point. The Catholic leadership of Tours succeeded in blocking the return of Protestant officers to the présidial court of the city until January 1564 at which point an arrêt (a royal decree) from the conseil privé forced their hand.

In 1564, the seigneur de Chavigny was appointed lieutenant-general of Touraine, Maine and Anjou in the absence of the governor, the duc de Montpensier. Chavigny endeavoured to keep the peace in Tours, by keeping the Protestants out of the city.

By January 1564, the royal commissioners were able to report that Tours was peaceable, though it was a delicate peace.

A brawl broke out in Tours in 1564, with a group of Protestants attacking a Catholic locksmith they believed to have been involved in an anti-Protestant massacre of the previous year.

After the return of the Protestant members of the présidial court, two among their number, Gardette and Goyet, were subject to particular slander. Goyet was accused of rape, murdering his wife, selling off the relics of the church of Saint-Martin, and suborning witnesses. Nicholls finds these accusations less credible than his alleged 'seditious statements' which included accusing the corps de ville of rebellion, spreading the 'good (false) news' of the death of the king's sister Élisabeth in childbirth in 1565, and the exciting possibility of the accidental death of Henri II in 1559 being repeated at the 1565 Bayonne meeting between the French and Spanish crowns. Gardette for his part was to have made threats against the seigneur de Chavigny and raised sedition in the streets.

==== Corpus Christi 1564 ====
Violence erupted around the flashpoint of the Corpus Christi procession in June 1564. For the procession through the city, the lieutenant-general of Touraine, the seigneur de Chavigny, looking to provoke things, ordered the Protestant households to decorate their houses for the occasion.

In the Protestant account, the Catholics boasted that they would cut the throats of the Protestants and drown them. Drums were beaten to muster Catholics to attack the Protestants. Roaming Catholic bands attacked Protestant households, and had sacked one household whose owner was absent, dumping the furniture before the cathedral. The furniture was proclaimed to apologise for its Protestant master. A former mayor of Tours was chief among the responsible parties in the Protestant estimation.

These charges were denied by the Catholic clergy and municipality. In their telling, the Protestants under the cover of the edict of Amboise were engaging in new seditions. Wounded Protestants were either the aggressors, or criminals. The ex-mayors house had been sacked by the Protestants, and in his country house his daughter had been tortured, and silverware looted.

In making sense of these variant accounts, Nicholls looks to the different cultural frameworks the Protestants and Catholics operated in (both in a genuine sense and as an excuse for violence). The music that the Protestants found so threatening, was a traditional performance relating to the leading of a bride and groom to church. Similarly, an assault on Lefebvre was occasioned by his mocking of passers-by and his attempt to prevent someone dressed as a fool participating in the day's festivities. The day before the festivities, Chavigny had ordered all households in Tours to hang tapestries outside their houses and clean the streets for the coming day. This was an attempt to flush out the Protestants of the city, and when one Protestant resolved to express his frustration by throwing dirty water out of his window on the procession, the Catholics retaliated by breaking into his house and kidnapping his child to baptise them a Catholic. Christin and Le Roux support this interpretation, naming the man as Victor, and adding that the Catholic threatened to drown and murder all the Protestants in the city. Other houses were subsequently broken into under the eyes of the ex-mayor.

==== Protestant flight ====
In November 1564, the leading Protestants of Tours, among them those of the présidial court fled Tours. The reason for their having done so is not clear. From Maillé, Goyet claimed the plague had forced his withdrawal. The Catholics of Tours meanwhile imagined their departure was to bring about a plot against the city. The commissioner Myron sent an agent to Maillé, where he found many bourgeois Protestants held up.

The Protestants of Tours presented a petition against commissioner Myron's activities to the royal court. He was accused of being partisan in favour of the Catholics of Tours, with whom he had connections. Myron was able to offer little of substance by way of reply and was forced to admit that he lacked commission to enforce the edict of Amboise in Touraine. He claimed his relatives in Tours were well respected by both sides. His defence carried little water in the royal council, and the Protestant petition was affirmed.

In February 1565, the maréchal de Vielleville visited Touraine as part of the pacification effort, frequenting the city of Tours to assist in the application of the edict of Amboise. Little is known about his mission, which proved ineffectual, but the Catholics believed they had a new ally in him.

==== Further violence ====
In a violent episode on 8 July, two Catholics were left dead. The Protestant progressions to and from Maillé had been conducted under armed escort for their safety. This was to the umbrage of the Catholics, who every week saw an armed band of Protestants head out from and return to Tours. This armed guard had apparently opened fire on the Catholics. After the discovery of the dead Catholics, the ex-mayor Coustely set about blaming the Protestants of the présidial court. This did little to cool passions, and a Catholic mob attacked the house of a leader of the Protestant party. The next day, a rumour spread that a Catholic butcher had been killed by the Protestants. In response, Protestant homes were ransacked, and eight killed. It took Coustely, and the parading of the alive butcher through the streets, to calm tempers.

Protestants outside Tours, at Rochecorbon, heard a different narrative of 8 July by which two leading Protestants had been murdered. They therefore feared all Protestants returning from Maillé would be cut down. Peace was only restored by the arrival of the seigneur de Chavigny with his soldiers, the lieutenant-general imposing a curfew on the city.

While the municipality was not interested in a new massacre of the Protestants of Tours, they sought to blame a Protestant plot for the recent violence. Scraps of evidence were proffered to support claims from a plot to murder Coustey to a plot to seize Tours and murder all the Catholics. Justifying themselves to Chavigny and Montpensier, the municipality rejected the idea of even limited toleration, as the Protestants clearly wanted revenge for the massacre of 1562, and were by their nature untrustworthy.

Shortly after the conference at Bayonne, Catherine wrote to one of her secretaries of state, the baron de Châteauneuf to investigate an incident that had transpired at Tours, and report back to her.

On 15 November 1565, the new governor of Touraine, the prince dauphin d'Auvergne made his entry into Tours.

A new clash transpired in January 1566, with the Protestants returning from Maillé finding themselves locked out of the city by the Catholics, forced to spend the night outside the walls. Meanwhile, fighting took place at Maillé.

To the pleasure of the Protestants, Chavigny resigned as lieutenant-general of Touraine in March 1566 and was succeeded by a certain sieur de Monteraud. Chavigny would continue to be a force in the affairs of Touraine. The Protestants were supportive of the possibility of municipal reform that offered the possibility of tightening the administrative regime to a more selective group. Nicholls proposes that the Catholic party might have been trying to pack the corps de ville with their supporters. Regardless, the reform went nowhere.

== Orléanais and Berry ==
=== Orléans ===
Protestants in Orléans took the coming of peace poorly. They destroyed the various churches that were to be handed back to their former Catholic owners.

In April 1563, the seigneur de Sipierre was established as the new (Catholic) governor of the city of Orléans. The king, keen to see the Protestants and Catholics of the city live in good accord with one another hoped to see Sipierre confiscate all the weapons held in private hands in the city, locking them up in a tower.

==== Sharing the city ====
The Protestants were to be allocated a place of worship in the city, while Catholic worship was to be preserved. A few weeks later Sipierre reported on his initial progress to Catherine. He had arrested a fiery Jacobin, six 'gallants' and locked away the weapons as instructed. Only the officers of the king and Catherine were to be permitted to wear swords.

The citadel was revitalised and well garrisoned with loyal sorts. In addition to this a new fort was built.

The Protestants of Orléans petitioned the crown around May/June 1563 to complain about a preceding Catholic petition which had apparently been granted, and which dramatically curtailed Protestant rights of worship in Orléans. This petition thus sought to ensure that the rights afforded by the edict of Amboise as they understood them (the right to worship, excommunicate, visit the sick, bury their dead, and collect money) be preserved for them.

The consulate of the city was equally divided between twelve Catholics and twelve Protestants.

In 1563, a Protestant school was established in Orléans. It would continue to function until it was closed by the Catholics in the summer of 1568.

=== Vendôme ===
After being denied by the French court, the queen of Navarre retreated to her territory of Vendôme. Here the Protestants complained of the royal agent Miron who had been entrusted with enforcing the edict of Amboise, decrying him as a persecutor. Jeanne had appointed a Protestant as both governor and lieutenant-general of the duché. The latter figure, a certain sieur de La Roche-Turpin, was assassinated while he was on a hunt.

In the wake of this murder, Jeanne clashed with the crown's agents in the area, and the governor of Anjou, the duc de Montpensier. She attempted to pursue the perpetrators of the murder, raising men to capture and imprison them. Montpensier by contrast, looked to see them released. The dispute would last months, with the queen of Navarre writing Catherine to complain that the murderers were taking refuge in a royal fortress and that she had made appeals to the duc de Montpensier. She asked that Catherine dispatch a good commissioner to resolve the situation.

Discussions of a planned armed uprising were reported by the Imperial ambassador Simon Renard in October of that same year. He noted that there was unrest in Vendôme, Maine, and Touraine.

=== Chartres ===
The bishop of Chartres, Charles de Guillart, who had refused to sign a confession of Catholic faith at the colloquy of Poissy in 1561, gave his approval to the issuance of a Protestant catechism in 1566.

=== Blois ===
In October 1563, in Blois, an assembly of both the Protestants and Catholics was undertaken. The goal, to instil tranquillity between them, so that they might live in peace according to the edict of Amboise. To this end, a joint guard would be established. The Catholics agreed to concessions for the Protestants, but conditionally, with the goal that no further special provisions be granted.

After disorders in Blois, Catherine wrote to the seigneur de Chemault noting that her son would be writing to him on the troubles in the city, and that he was to go there and punish the instigators.

=== Berry ===
The Berrichon city of Sancerre would be among the small handful of places upon the river Loire that remained in Protestant hands after the civil war of 1562-1563.

== Sources ==
- Baumgartner, Frederic (1986). Change and Continuity in the French Episcopate: The Bishops and the Wars of Religion 1547-1610.
- Benedict, Philip (2003). Rouen during the Wars of Religion. Cambridge University Press.
- Bernstein, Hilary (2004). Between Crown and Community: Politics and Civic Culture in Sixteenth-Century Poitiers. Cornell University Press.
- Bourquin, Laurent (1994). Noblesse Seconde et Pouvoir en Champagne aux XVIe et XVIIe Siècles. Éditions de la Sorbonne.
- Bourquin, Laurent (2001). Les Nobles, La Ville, et Le Roi: L'Autorité Nobilaire en Anjou Pendant les Guerres de Religion. Belin.
- Brunet, Serge (2017). «De l'Espagnol dedans le Ventre!»: Les Catholiques du Sud-Ouest de La France face à La Réforme (vers 1540–1589) Tome 1. Honoré Champion.
- Brunet, Serge (2023). "Jeanne d'Albret, Pierre d'Albret, Évêque de Comminges, et la «Trahison» de Blaise de Monluc. Aux Origines de la Ligue dans le Sud-Ouest de la France". In Berriot-Salvadore, Evelyne; Chareyre, Philippe; Martin-Ulrich, Claudie (eds.). Jeanne d'Albret et sa Cour.
- Carpi, Olivia (2005). Une République Imaginaire: Amiens pendant les Troubles de Religion (1559-1597). Belin.
- Carpi, Olivia (2012). Les Guerres de Religion (1559-1598): Un Conflit Franco-Français. Ellipses.
- Carroll, Stuart (2006). Blood and Violence in Early Modern France. Oxford University Press.
- Carroll, Stuart (2011). Martyrs and Murderers: The Guise Family and the Making of Europe. Oxford University Press.
- Carroll, Stuart (2013). "'Nager entre deux eaux': The Princes and the Ambiguities of French Protestantism". Sixteenth Century Journal. 44 4.
- Cassan, Michel (1996). Le Temps des Guerres de Religion: Le Case du Limousin (vers 1530 - vers 1630). Publisud.
- Champion, Pierre (1937). Catherine de Médicis présente à Charles IX son Royaume (1564-1566). Grasset.
- Champion, Pierre (1938). Paris sous les Derniers Valois - Paris au Temps des Guerres de Religion:Fin du Règne de Henri II, Régence de Catherine de Médicis, Charles IX. Calmann-Lévy.
- Champion, Pierre (1939). Charles IX: La France et le Controle de l'Espagne (Tome 1). Grasset.
- Chareyre, Philippe; Daussy, Hugues (2024). "Les Assemblées et le Système Politique Huguenot (1562-1598)". In Charere, Philippe; Daussy, Hugues (eds.). La France Huguenote: Histoire Institutionnelle d'une Minorité Religieuse (XVIe-XVIIIe Siècle). Presses Universitaires de Rennes.
- Chevallier, Pierre (1985). Henri III: Roi Shakespearien. Fayard.
- Christin, Olivier (1997). La Paix de Religion: L'Autonomisation de la Raison Politique au XVIe Siècle. Seuil.
- Cloulas, Ivan (1979). Catherine de Médicis. Fayard.
- Conner, Philip (2000). Huguenot Heartland: Montauban during the French Wars of Religion. University of St. Andrews.
- Constant, Jean-Marie (1984). Les Guise. Hachette.
- Constant, Jean-Marie (1996). La Ligue. Fayard.
- Crété, Liliane (1985). Coligny. Fayard.
- Daussy, Hugues (2015). Le Parti Huguenot: Chronique d'une Désillusion (1557-1572). Droz.
- Daussy, Hugues (2024). "Les Assemblées et le Système Politique Huguenot (1562-1598)". In Charere, Philippe; Daussy, Hugues (eds.). La France Huguenote: Histoire Institutionnelle d'une Minorité Religieuse (XVIe-XVIIIe Siècle). Presses Universitaires de Rennes.
- Dauvin, Antoine (2021). Un Mythe de Concorde Urbaine?: le Corps de Ville de Caen, le Gouverneur et le Roi durant les Guerres de Religion (1557-1594). Normandie Université.
- Davies, Joan (1979). "Persecution and Protestantism: Toulouse 1562-1575". The Historical Journal. 22 1.
- Decrue, Francis (1889). Anne, Duc de Montmorency: Connétable et Pair de France sous les Rois Henri II, François II et Charles IX. E. Plon, Nourrit et Cie.
- Diefendorf, Barbara (1985). "Prologue to a Massacre: Popular Unrest in Paris 1555-1572". The American Historical Review. 90 5.
- Diefendorf, Barbara (1991). Beneath the Cross: Catholics and Huguenots in Sixteenth Century Paris. Oxford University Press.
- Duvauchelle, Christine (2023). "Assaut de Nîmes dans la nuit du 30 Septembre au 1er Octobre 1567". Les Guerres de Religion 1559-1610: La Haine des Clans. In Fine Éditions d'art.
- Foa, Jérémie (2004). "Making Peace: The Commissioners for Enforcing the Pacification Edicts in the Reign of Charles IX (1560-1574)". French History. 18 3.
- Foa, Jérémie (2016). "Faire la Paix au Temps des Guerres de Religion, L'Exemple des Commisaires des Édits". Proslogion: Studies in Medieval and Early Modern Social History and Culture. 1 (13).
- François, Michel (1959). Lettres de Henri III, Roi de France: Tome I (1557 - Août 1574). Société de l'Histoire de France.
- Gal, Stéphane (2000). Grenoble au Temps de la Ligue: Étude Politique, Sociale et Religieuse d'une Cité en Crise (vers 1562 - vers 1598). Presses Universitaires de Grenoble.
- Garrisson-Estèbe, Janine (1980). Protestants du Midi 1559-1598. Privat.
- Gould, Kevin (2016). Catholic Activism in South-West France 1540-1570. Routledge.
- Greengrass, Mark; Rentet, Thierry (2023). "Un serviteur du roi affronte ses critiques Bertrand-Raimbaud de Simiane de Gordes (1565-1566)". In Gellard, Matthieu; Haan, Bertrand; Foa, Jérémie (eds.). Servir le Prince en Temps de Guerre Civile: Dans L'Europe des XVIe et XVIIe Siècles. Presses Universitaires de Rennes.
- Harding, Robert (1978). Anatomy of a Power Elite: the Provincial Governors in Early Modern France. Yale University Press.
- Heller, Henry (1991). Iron and Blood: Civil War in Sixteenth-Century France. McGill-Queen's University Press.
- Holt, Mack (2020). The Politics of Wine in Early Modern France: Religion and Popular Culture in Burgundy 1477-1630. Cambridge University Press.
- Jouanna, Arlette (1998a). "Le Temps des Guerres de Religion en France (1559-1598)". In Jouanna, Arlette; Boucher, Jacqueline; Biloghi, Dominique; Le Thiec, Guy (eds.). Histoire et Dictionnaire des Guerres de Religion.
- Jouanna, Arlette (2021). La France du XVIe Siècle 1483-1598. Presses Universitaires de France.
- Kaiser, Wolfgang (1992). Marseille au Temps des Troubles: Morphologie Sociale et Luttes de Factions 1559 – 1596. Translated by Chaix, Florence. Éditions de l'École des Hautes Études en Sciences Sociales.
- Knecht, Robert (1996). The Rise and Fall of Renaissance France. Fontana Press.
- Knecht, Robert (2000). The French Civil Wars. Longman.
- Knecht, Robert (2010). The French Wars of Religion, 1559-1598. Routledge.
- Knecht, Robert (2014). Catherine de' Medici. Routledge.
- Konnert, Mark (1997). Civic Agendas & Religious Passion: Châlons-sur-Marne during the French Wars of Religion 1560-1594. Sixteenth Century Journal Publishers Inc.
- Konnert, Mark (2006). Local Politics in the French Wars of Religion: The Towns of Champagne, the Duc de Guise and the Catholic League 1560-1595. Ashgate.
- Labourdette, Jean François (2018). Charles IX, un Roi dans la Tourmente des Guerres Civiles (1560 – 1574). Honoré Champion.
- Leclerc Lafage, Valérie (2010). Montpellier au Temps des Troubles de Religion: Pratiques Testamentaires et Confessionnalisation (1554–1622). Honoré Champion.
- Le Roux, Nicolas (2000). La Faveur du Roi: Mignons et Courtisans au Temps des Derniers Valois. Champ Vallon.
- Le Roux, Nicolas (2022). 1559-1629 Les Guerres de Religion. Gallimard.
- Le Roux, Nicolas (2023). "Les Protestants, le Roi et la Ligue: Les Guerres de Religion dans la France du Nord". In Le Roux, Nicolas (ed.). Les Guerres de Religion: Une Histoire de l'Europe au XVIe Siècle. Passés Composés.
- Mariéjol, Jean H. (1983). La Réforme, la Ligue, l'Édit de Nantes. Tallandier.
- Miquel, Pierre (1980). Les Guerres de Religion. Fayard.
- Moreil, Françoise; Krumenacker, Yves (2024). "Les Institutions Éducatives". In Charere, Philippe; Daussy, Hugues (eds.). La France Huguenote: Histoire Institutionnelle d'une Minorité Religieuse (XVIe-XVIIIe Siècle). Presses Universitaires de Rennes.
- Nicholls, David (1994). "Protestants Catholics and Magistrates in Tours 1562-1572: The Making of a Catholic City during the Religious Wars". French History. 8 1.
- Nicoll, David (2020). Noble Identity during the French Wars of Religion: Antoine de Crussol, the duc d'Uzès. University of Warwick.
- Nicoll, David (2025). "The Difficulties of Disarmement during the French Wars of Religion: the Role of Antoine, comte de Crussol". French History. XX.
- Pailhès, Claudine (2022). Les Comtes de Foix: Des Pyrénées au Trône de France XIe-XVIe Siècle. Éditions Loubatières.
- Pernot, Michel (2013). Henri III: Le Roi Décrié. Éditions de Fallois.
- Pitts, Vincent (2012). Henri IV of France: His Reign and Age. Johns Hopkins University Press.
- Potter, David (1997). The French Wars of Religion: Selected Documents. Palgrave Macmillan.
- Potter, David (2021). The French Wars of Religion in France, 1559-1598: A History in Documents. unpublished.
- Rivault, Antoine (2023). Le Duc d'Étampes et la Bretagne: Le Métier de gouverneur de Province à la Renaissance (1543-1565). Presses Universitaires de Rennes.
- Robbins, Kevin (1997). City on the Ocean Sea: La Rochelle, 1530-1650 Urban Society, Religion and Politics on the French Atlantic Frontier. Brill.
- Roberts, Penny (1996). A City in Conflict: Troyes during the French Wars of Religion. Manchester University Press.
- Roberts, Penny (2013). Peace and Authority during the French Religious Wars c.1560-1600. Palgrave Macmillan.
- Roelker, Nancy Lyman (1968). Queen of Navarre: Jeanne d'Albret 1528-1572. Harvard University Press.
- Salmon, J.H.M. (1979). Society in Crisis: France in the Sixteenth Century. Metheun & Co.
- Souriac, Pierre-Jean (2008). Une Guerre Civile: Affrontements Religieux et Militaires dans Le Midi Toulousain (1562-1596). Champ Vallon.
- Souriac, Pierre-Jean (2023). "Se Battre sur les Frontières Confessionnelles: Le Sud du Royaume de France en Guerre Civile". In Le Roux, Nicolas (ed.). Les Guerres de Religion: Une Histoire de l'Europe au XVIe Siècle. Passés Composés.
- Sournia, Jean-Charles (1981). Blaise de Monluc: Soldat et Écrivain (1500-1577). Fayard.
- Sutherland, Nicola (1962). The French Secretaries of State in the Age of Catherine de Medici. The Athlone Press.
- Tievant, Claude (1993). Le Gouverneur de Languedoc Pendant Les Premières Gueurres de Religion (1559 – 1574): Henri de Montmorency-Damville. Publisud.
- Tingle, Elizabeth C. (2006). Authority and Society in Nantes during the French Wars of Religion, 1559-1598. Manchester University Press.
- Thompson, James (1909). The Wars of Religion in France 1559-1576: The Huguenots, Catherine de Medici and Philip II. Chicago University Press.
- Tulchin, Allan (2010). That Men Would Praise the Lord: The Triumph of Protestantism in Nîmes 1530-1570. Oxford University Press.
- Venard, Marc (1993). Réforme Protestante, Réforme Catholique dans la Province d'Avignon - XVIe Siècle -. Cerf.
- Vray, Nicole (1997). La Guerre des Religions dans la France de l'Ouest: Poitou-Aunis-Saintonge 1534-1610. Geste Éditions.
- Wanegffelen, Thierry (2005). Catherine de Médicis: Le Pouvoir au Fémenin. Payot & Rivages.
