= Joseph Capuron =

French obstetrician

Joseph Capuron (10 May 1767, in Larroque-Saint-Sernin – 1850) was a French obstetrician.

In 1802 he received his medical doctorate in Paris, where in 1822 he obtained his agrégation at the faculty of medicine. In 1823 he became a member of the Académie Nationale de Médecine.

== Published works ==
Capuron published several treatises on diseases of women and children, however his best known literary effort was an 1806 dictionary of medicine called Nouveau dictionnaire de médecine, de chirurgie, de physique, de chimie et d'histoire naturelle. In 1810, Capuron and physiologist Pierre-Hubert Nysten (1771–1818) published a second edition of the dictionary. Afterwards, there were numerous revisions and editions (as well as changes to the title of the dictionary) by Nysten, Émile Littré (1801–1881), et al. The twenty-first and final edition was published in 1908. His other works include:

- Aphrodisiographie, ou Tableau de la maladie vénérienne, 1807 – Aphrodisiography, or table of venereal disease.
- Tableau historique de l'art des accouchemens, 1810 – Historical table on the art of obstetrics.
- Cours théorique et pratique d'accouchemens, 1811 – Theoretical and practical courses of obstetrics.
- Traité des maladies des femmes, depuis la puberté jusqu'a l'age critique inclusivement, 1812 – Diseases of women, from puberty to the critical age inclusive.
- Traité des maladies des femmes, depuis la puberté jusqu'a l'age critique inclusivement, Seconde édition, revue corrigée et augmentée 1817 – Diseases of women, from puberty to the critical age inclusive.
- Traité des maladies des enfants jusqu'a la puberté, 1813 – Treatise on diseases of children up to puberty.
- Traité des maladies des enfants jusqu'a la puberté, Seconde édition 1820 – Treatise on diseases of children up to puberty.
- Notice sur les eaux minérales de Castéra-Verduzan, département du Gers, 1830 – On the mineral waters of Castera-Verduzan.

== Associated eponym ==
- Cardinal points of Capuron: Term associated with four fixed points in the pelvic inlet; the two iliopubic eminences anteriorly, and the two sacroiliac joints posteriorly. Also called the "cardinal points of the pelvic inlet".

== Bibliography ==
- Becker Medical Medical Library Catalog
- A Compend of Obstetrics, etc. by Henry Gardner Landis and William Hughes Wells
