= Beaucaire =

Beaucaire may refer to:

- Nicolas Beaucaire (1972–2025), Swiss actor

Several communes in France:

- Beaucaire, Gard, in the Gard department
  - Gare de Beaucaire, a railway station
- Beaucaire, Gers, in the Gers department

== See also ==
- Le souper de Beaucaire, a political pamphlet written by Napoleon Bonaparte in 1793
