= Émile Blanchard =

French zoologist and entomologist

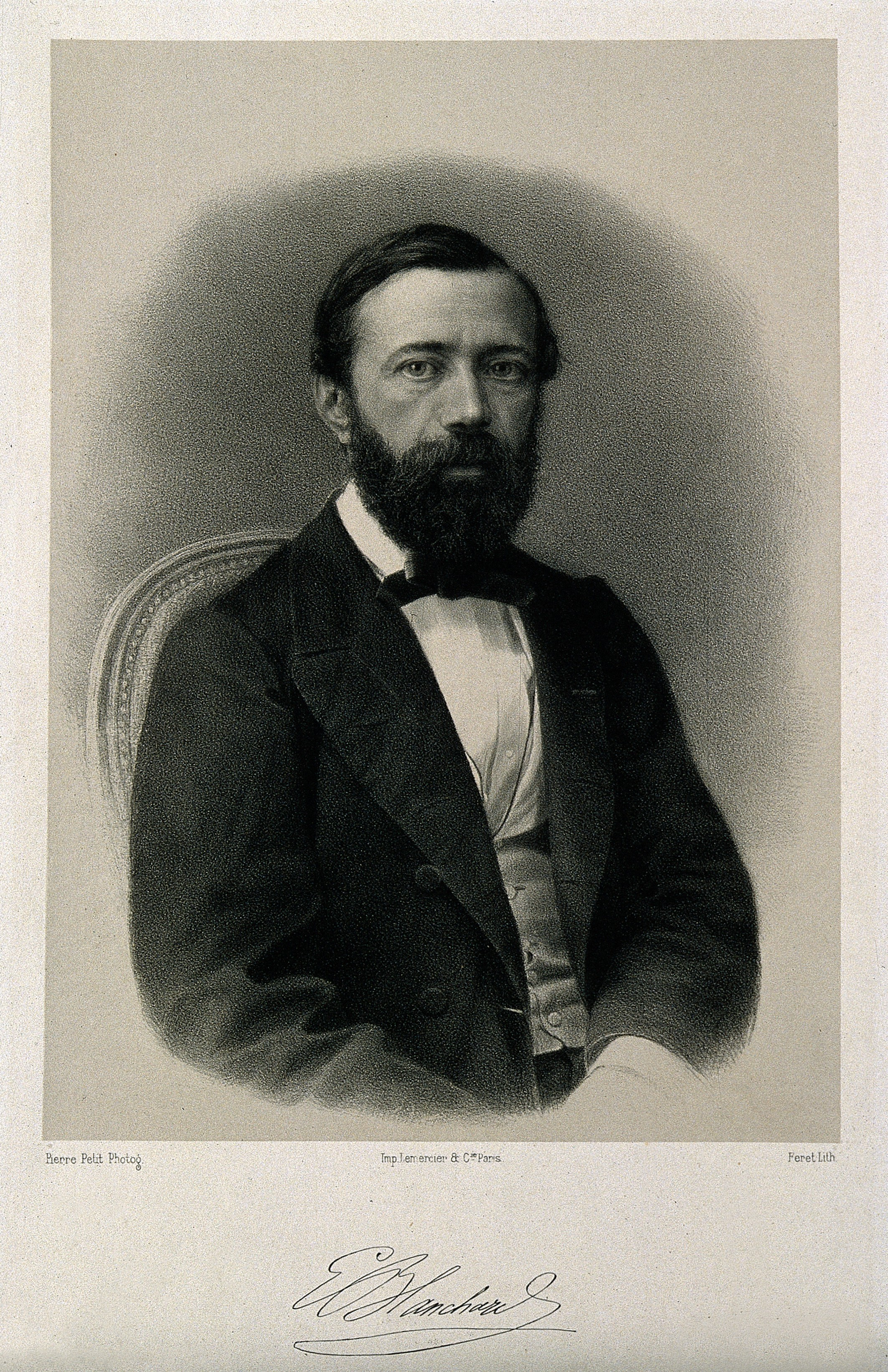
- Born: 6 March 1819; Paris, France
- Died: 11 February 1900 (aged 80); Paris, France
- Citizenship: French
- Scientific career
- Fields: Entomology; Zoology
- Workplaces: Muséum national d'Histoire naturelle Natural History Museum

Charles Émile Blanchard (French pronunciation: [ʃaʁl emil blɑ̃ʃaʁ]; 6 March 1819 – 11 February 1900) was a French zoologist and entomologist.

== Career ==
Blanchard was born in Paris. His father was an artist and naturalist and Émile began natural history very early in life. When he was 14 years old, Jean Victoire Audouin (1797—1841) allowed him access to the laboratory of the Muséum national d'Histoire naturelle. In 1838, he became a technician or préparateur in this then, as now, famous institution. In 1841, he became assistant-naturalist.

He accompanied Henri Milne-Edwards (1800—1885) and Jean Louis Armand de Quatrefages de Breau (1810—1892) to Sicily on a marine zoology expedition. He published, in 1845 a Histoire des insectes, or History of the insects and, in 1854—1856 Zoologie agricole or Agricultural Zoology. This last work is remarkable: it presents in a precise way the harmful or pest species and the damage they cause to various crop plants. This work was illustrated by his father. Blanchard was critical of Darwinism. He argued that Charles Darwin's pigeon studies were unscientific and that his ideas about evolution were false and unoriginal.

In 1870, Blanchard and Charles-Philippe Robin opposed the election of Darwin as a corresponding member of the French Academy of Sciences.

He published an atlas of the anatomy of the vertebrates which appeared between 1852 and 1864. This publication raised his hopes to obtain the chair of reptiles and fish at the Natural History Museum left vacant by the death of Auguste Duméril (1812—1870) but it was finally Léon Vaillant (1834—1914) who was selected. However, in 1862, he was given the chair of natural history of Crustacea, Arachnida and Insects. He left this in 1894 following his infirmity. He was elected, in 1862 into the Academy of Science. He began to lose his sight after 1860 and became blind in 1890. He died in Paris.

== Selected publications ==
- The Transformations (or Metamorphoses) of Insects (1870) [with Duncan P. Martin]
- Histoire des Insectes (1845)
- Catalogue des Coleopteres du Museum d'Histoire Naturelle de Paris (1850–51)
- Métamorphoses mœurs et instincts des insectes (1868)
