= Yvonne Cormeau =

British espionage

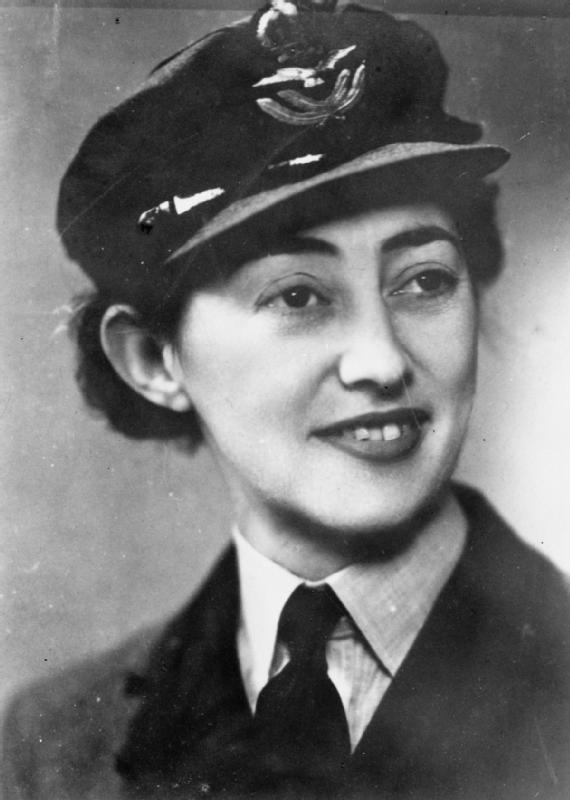
- Born: Beatrice Yvonne Biesterfeld; 18 December 1909; Shanghai, China
- Died: 25 December 1997 (aged 88); Fleet, Hampshire, United Kingdom
- Military career
- Allegiance: United Kingdom; France
- Branch: Special Operations Executive; French Resistance
- Service years: 1943–1945
- Rank: Field agent and wireless operator
- Commands: Wheelwright
- Conflicts: World War II
- Awards: MBE, Légion d'honneur, Croix de Guerre, Médaille de la Résistance

Cormeau and the Wheelwright circuit were based in Gers Department.

Yvonne Cormeau, born Beatrice Yvonne Biesterfeld (18 December 1909 – 25 December 1997), code name Annette, was an agent of the United Kingdom's clandestine organisation, the Special Operations Executive (SOE), in World War II. She was the wireless operator for the Wheelwright network led by George Starr in south west France from August 1943 until the liberation of France from Nazi German occupation in September 1944. The purpose of SOE was to conduct espionage, sabotage, and reconnaissance in occupied Europe against the Axis powers. SOE agents allied themselves with French Resistance groups and supplied them with weapons and equipment parachuted in from England.

Cormeau was noted for the quality and quantity of her wireless transmissions. SOE cryptographer Leo Marks said that in more than 400 transmissions Cormeau never made a single mistake. Cormeau also survived an unusually long time for wireless operators who were vulnerable to detection and capture by the German occupiers. She was a recipient of the Order of the British Empire from the United Kingdom and the Legion of Honour and Croix de Guerre from France.

== Early life ==
Beatrice Yvonne Biesterfeld was born in 1909 to a Belgian consular official and Scottish mother. She was educated in both Belgium and Scotland. She was living in London when in 1937 she married Charles Emile Cormeau, a chartered accountant. Her husband enlisted in The Rifle Brigade and in 1940 he was wounded in France and was sent back to the UK. Shortly afterwards he was killed when their London home was bombed. Her life was saved by a bathtub which fell over her head and protected her. She sent her two-year-old daughter Yvette to the countryside to escape the frequent bombing of London.

== World War II ==
=== Recruitment and training ===
Newly widowed, Cormeau decided to "take her husband's place in the Armed Forces" and she joined the WAAF as an administrator in November 1941 (Service No 2027172). While serving at RAF Swinderby she answered an appeal on the noticeboard for linguists, and was recruited by SOE and began training as an F Section wireless operator on 15 February 1943. She was promoted to the rank of Flight Officer. Her daughter, Yvette, was only two years old at the time. Cormeau placed her in a convent of Ursuline nuns in Oxfordshire where she remained until she was five. She did her SOE training with Yolande Beekman and Noor Inayat Khan. She was the only one of the three to survive her mission to France.

On the night of 22 August 1943 Cormeau left RAF Tempsford in a No. 161 Squadron RAF Halifax aircraft and parachuted into Saint-Antoine-du-Queyret, 45 kilometres (28 miles) east of Bordeaux. Her assignment was to work as the wireless operator on the SOE F Section Wheelwright circuit in Gascony. The leader of the circuit (or network) was George Starr, code name Hilaire, whom she had known before the war when living in Brussels. Her code name was Annette. She declined to take with her the cyanide pill offered by SOE to agents so they could commit suicide if captured. She arrived armed with a .22 revolver, but, on Starr's advice, she never carried it with her during her 13 months in France. To be captured by the Germans while carrying a firearm or a cyanide pill was, he told her, a death sentence.

=== Wireless operations ===
Cormeau was a particularly skilled wireless (W/T) operator, being able to transmit 18 to 22 words per minute in Morse code, compared with the 12 words per minute of the average operator. This was important because the longer an operator (called a "pianist" in SOE slang) was on line the more likely the Germans were to find them using direction finding equipment.

The standard wireless transceiver issued to SOE wireless operators was the B Mark II, a cumbersome 14-kilogram (31 lb) machine concealed in a suitcase. It required the operator to extend a wire aerial 20 metres (66 ft) long. In the rural areas in which Cormeau worked she often stretched the aerial through a vineyard. The wireless could be powered by either AC (household) electricity or an automobile battery. Cormeau preferred to use a battery as she believed it was harder for the Germans to locate the source of the transmission and also because the villages in which she worked often lacked electricity. She carried the crystals for the machine and the codes separately in a hidden pocket of her briefcase. She preferred to use codes written on silk handkerchiefs rather than more cumbersome one-time pads made of paper. Early in her mission, SOE provided Cormeau with a much more portable Type A MK III wireless which weighed only four kilograms (9 lb) and was contained in an attache case.

The most important way for a wireless operator to avoid detection and arrest was to use the wireless only briefly (not more than 20 minutes per transmission), infrequently, and from widely different locations. The life of a wireless operator was lonely. The SOE's instructions were, "The ideal is for the W/T operator to do nothing but W/T work, to see his organiser [leader] as little as possible, if at all, and to have contact with the fewest possible number of the circuit."

=== At work ===
In the first few months she was in France, Cormeau worked also as a courier for Starr. She was scheduled to do three wireless transmissions a week, which also involved coding and decoding messages. The Wheelwright network was large in area and she changed her location often, never staying in one house more than three days. This was for her own security, as well as the security of the rural families who permitted her to stay with them and transmit from their homes and properties. As the Wheelwright network was large in area, she often had to bicycle up to 50 kilometres (31 miles) to change residences and to deliver or receive messages. While traveling around, she also identified fields that could be used to parachute supplies or as landing areas for airplanes and supplied the coordinates to SOE in London. She identified herself as a district nurse, thus giving her a reason for moving from place to place if stopped by Germans or the French police, the Milice, to check her papers. She was almost arrested by the Germans after being betrayed by an agent codenamed Rodolph. However, she continued to operate, despite being confronted by "wanted" posters in her neighbourhood which gave an accurate sketch of her appearance. She was stopped at a German roadblock with Starr; the pair was questioned while a gun was held to their backs. Eventually the Germans accepted her story and the false identification papers and she succeeded in passing her wireless equipment off as an X-ray machine.

In the early months of 1944, as the invasion of France by allies was anticipated, the tempo of activity by the resistance increased and Cormeau's work as a wireless operator became more demanding. She now transmitted several times a day and she stayed for lengthy periods in one place, the hilltop village of Castelnau-sur-l'Auvignon, the headquarters of George Starr. The official historian of SOE, M.R.D. Foot described Cormeau's work:

[She was] a perfectly unobtrusive and secure craftswoman...She broke one of the strictest rules of wireless security--i.e. always keep on the move--with success: she transmitted for six consecutive months from the same house. She could see for three miles from the window where she worked, which was one safeguard; a more effective one was that there was no running water in the village, so the Germans who knew there was an English wireless operator somewhere close by never thought of looking for her there.

Cormeau sent over 400 messages to London, second only to Auguste Floiras of the Jockey network who operated for a longer period of time. She made arrangements for arms and supplies to be dropped for the local Maquis. She assisted in the cutting of power and telephone lines, resulting in the isolation of the Wehrmacht Group G garrison near Toulouse.

In June 1944, Cormeau was shot in the leg while escaping from a German attack on Castelnau, but managed to escape with her wireless. The dress she wore on this occasion and the bloodstained briefcase she carried are on permanent display in the Imperial War Museum in London along with her WAAF officer's uniform. On 21 August, Toulouse fell to the French Forces of the Interior, the umbrella organisation of resistance fighters. Starr and Yvonne Cormeau drove into the city, American and British flags on their car. The liberation of southwestern France was complete. On 25 September, Cormeau and George Starr departed France, after Starr's clash with Charles de Gaulle.

== Honours and decorations ==
After the war she was appointed MBE, and decorated with the Légion d'honneur, Croix de Guerre and Médaille de la Résistance.

Member of the Order of the British Empire
1939–1945 Star	France and Germany Star	Defence Medal
Légion d'honneur (Chevalier)	Croix de Guerre (France)	Médaille de la Résistance

== Postwar ==
A year after the end of the war, Cormeau was demobilised with the WAAF rank of Flight Officer. She then worked as a translator and in the SOE section at the Foreign Office. She became a linchpin of F Section veterans and arranged their annual Bastille Day dinner. Cormeau and her daughter, Yvette, were reunited and lived in London. Cormeau was one of the earliest members of the Special Forces Club in London and she was a committee member. She promoted Anglo-French relations.

In her 70s, she married again to James Edgar Farrow, with whom she lived in Derbyshire. He predeceased her. She spent her later years at Tall Pines nursing home, formerly in Gally Hill Road, Fleet, Hampshire. After Yvonne Cormeau-Farrow died, she was survived by her daughter. Her memorial service was attended by representatives from both UK and French governments.

She was the subject of This Is Your Life in 1989 when she was surprised by Michael Aspel. She was interviewed for the movie Charlotte Gray and described as the "real Charlotte" of the novel and film. She was an adviser to the ITV television series Wish Me Luck.
