= Lagardère =

Lagardère may refer to:

== Companies ==
- Lagardère Group, a French media group
  - Lagardère Live Entertainment, an entertainment agency subsidiary
  - Lagardère News, the media activities arm
  - Lagardère Publishing, the book publishing arm

== People ==
- Arnaud Lagardère (born 1961), French businessman and son of Jean-Luc Lagardère
- Jean-Luc Lagardère (1928–2003), French engineer and businessman and CEO of the Lagardère Group

== Other uses ==
- Lagardère (TV series), a 1967 French television series
- Lagardère (film), a 2003 TV movie featuring the Paul Féval character
  - Henri de Lagardère, a character created by Paul Féval
- Lagardère, Gers, a commune of the Gers département, France
