= Casimir Davaine =

French physician

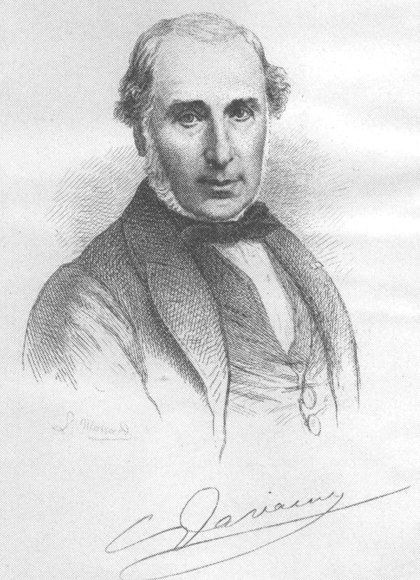
- Casimir Davaine
- Born: 19 March 1812
- Died: 14 October 1882 (aged 70)
- Known for: Bacillus anthracis
- Scientific career
- Fields: Microbiology

Casimir-Joseph Davaine (19 March 1812 – 14 October 1882) was a French medical doctor known for his pioneering work in identifying microbes as the cause of disease and in helping found the field of microbiology and parasitology. He was a founding member of the Societe de Biologie.

== Life and work ==
Davaine was born in Saint-Amand-les-Eaux,, the sixth of nine children of a distiller. He went to school at St. Amand, Tournai and Lille before joining the medicine faculty in Paris in 1830. From 1835 he became an externe, or assistant to Pierre François Olive Rayer at the Hopital de la Charite. He graduated in 1837 and received the license to practice medicine. In 1848 he was a founding member of the Societe de Biologie. With Rayer's support he was made medecin par quartier under the Second Empire. He conducted experiments at Rayer's La Charite and maintained experimental animals in the house of his wealthy patient Adolphe d'Eichthal. In 1850, Davaine working at the Hôpital Saint-Antoine and along with Rayer, discovered a certain microorganism in the blood of diseased and dying sheep. Davaine wrote Traité des entozoaires in which he suggested the use of worm eggs in faeces as a diagnostic method. While studying oysters he saw that the hermaphroditism involved the early maturation of the male parts. In the diseased blood, Rayer and Davaine observed the bacillus that is known today as Bacillus anthracis, the causative bacterium of anthrax. Soon afterwards, Rayer published a description of the bacillus in a paper titled, Inoculation du sang de rate (1850).

In 1863, Davaine demonstrated that the bacillus could be directly transmitted from one animal to another. He was able to identify the causative organism, but was unaware of its true etiology. Later on, German microbiologist Robert Koch investigated the etiology of Bacillus anthracis, and discovered its ability to produce "resting spores" that could stay alive in the soil for a long period of time to serve as a future source of infection. He pointed out in 1868, the role of bacteria in plant disease and showed that plants could be cured by heating an infected succulent plant to 52 degrees centigrade for some time. Davaine knew of Pasteur's method of heating to kill wine microbes when he conducted the experiment. Davaine developed a technique for immobilizing nematodes in chloral hydrate which allowed him to study the nematodes. He received an award of 1500 Francs from the Academie de Science for this study. Davaine identified antibiotic effect from walnut leaf extract in 1880.

Casimir Davaine is also credited for pioneer work in the study of sepsis (blood poisoning). Apart from medical studies he also wrote on philosophy and in 1871, while active on the field during the Franco-Prussian War, he wrote a book 'Les elements du bonheur' ('The elements of Happiness').

Davaine received a Cross of the Legion d'Honneur in 1858 and was a fellow of the Academy of Medicine from 1868. He spent his last years in Garches where the Davaine Foundation now stands. He established a large collection of roses in his garden.
