= Saint-Orens-Pouy-Petit =

- Commune
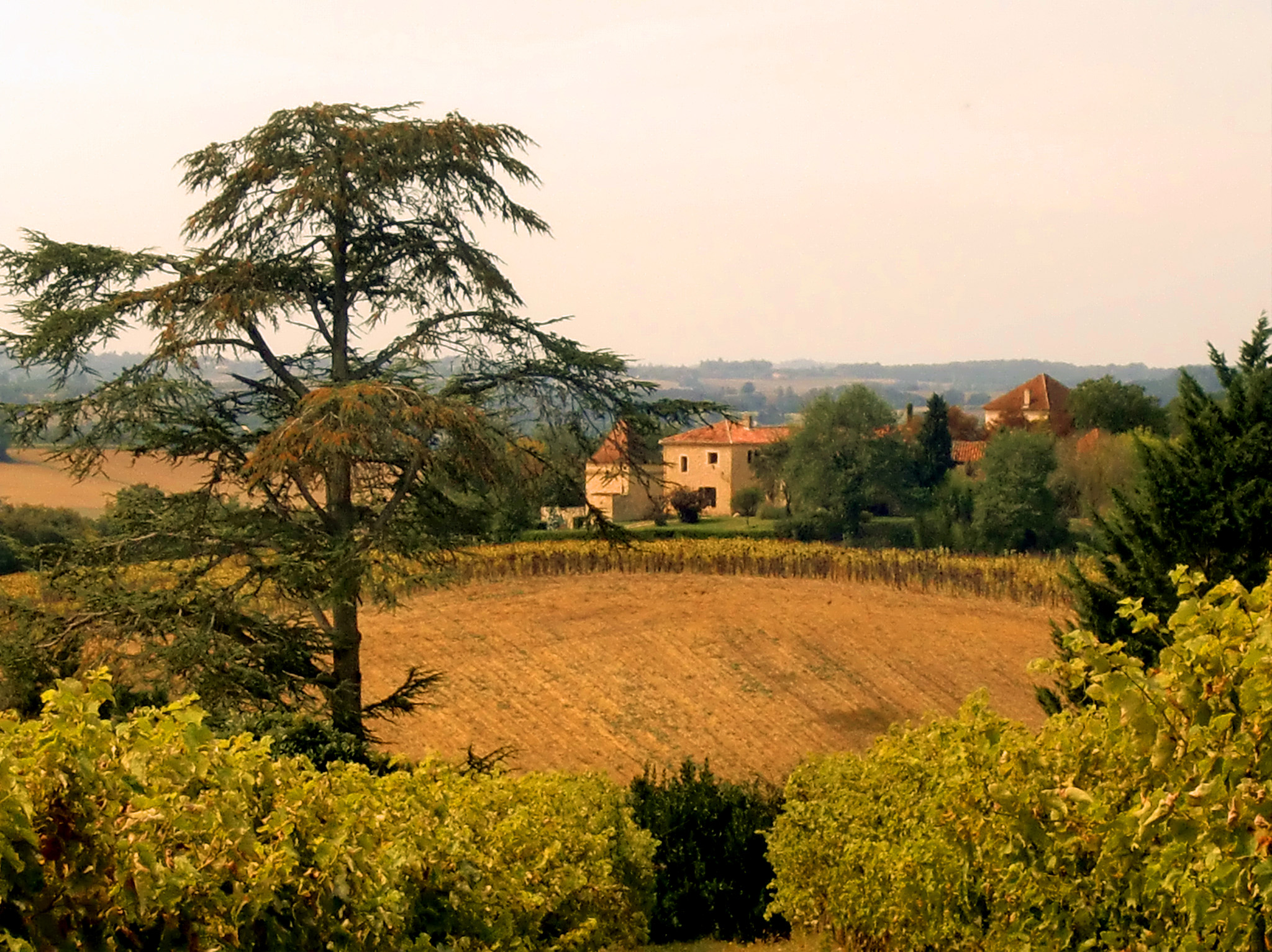
- A general view of Saint-Jouannet in Saint-Orens-Pouy-Petit
- Location of Saint-Orens-Pouy-Petit
- Location within France Location within Occitanie
- Coordinates: 43°55′04″N 0°26′05″E
- Country: France
- Region: Occitania
- Department: Gers
- Arrondissement: Condom
- Canton: Baïse-Armagnac

Government
  - Mayor (2024–2026): Pascale Faurie
- Area^{1}: 11.31 km^{2} (4.37 sq mi)
- Elevation: 200 m (660 ft)
- Highest elevation: 225 m (738 ft)
- Lowest elevation: 97 m (318 ft)
- Population (2023): 161
  - Density: 14.2/km^{2} (36.9/sq mi)
- Time zone: UTC+01:00 (CET)
  - Summer (DST): UTC+02:00 (CEST)
- INSEE/Postal code: 32400 /32100
- ^{1} French Land Register data, which excludes lakes, ponds, glaciers > 1 km^{2} (0.386 sq mi or 247 acres) and river estuaries.

Saint-Orens-Pouy-Petit (French pronunciation: [sɛ̃.t‿ɔʁɛ̃s pwi pəti]; Occitan: Sent Orens e Poi Petit) is a commune in the Gers department in southwestern France.

Central to the commune is the classic Gers Pierre Blanche bastide of St Orens, consisting of a walled community on a fierce outcrop of rock, situated 2 km to the east of the D654 between Condom and Saint-Puy. St Orens has views to the south, including the Pyrenees in fine weather.

On a facing hill is the hamlet of Hameau de Pouy-Petit.

Saint Orens holds a Catholic church and the Château St Orens (sixteenth century). Hameau de Pouy-Petit has the Château gascon de Pouy-Petit (eighteenth century).

== Geography ==
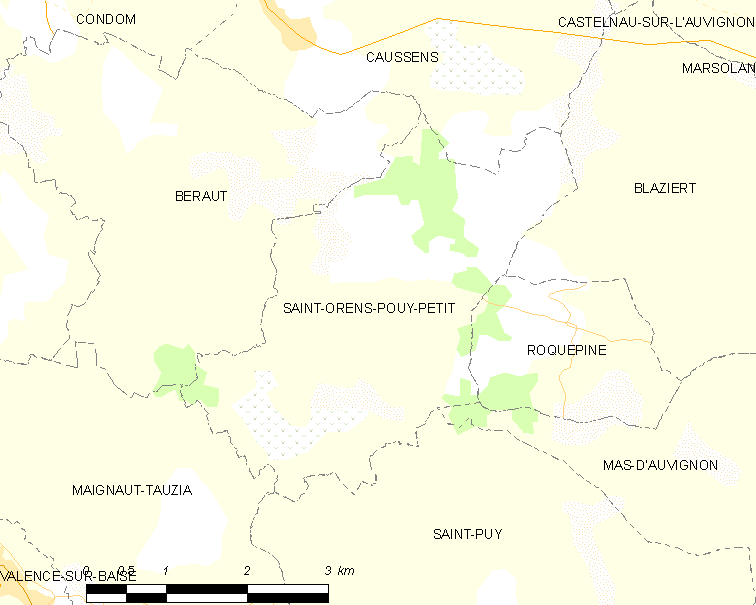
Saint-Orens-Pouy-Petit and its surrounding communes

== Population ==
Historical population
Year	Pop.	±% p.a.
1968	209	—
1975	172	−2.75%
1982	207	+2.68%
1990	190	−1.07%
1999	141	−3.26%
2007	140	−0.09%
2012	149	+1.25%
2017	193	+5.31%
2023	161	−2.98%
Source: INSEE

== Economy ==
Agriculture

St Orens sits within of a large agricultural region, with common crops including corn, colza, sunflowers and grain. There are also a number of vineyards, producing grapes for wine or distilling.

Local market towns are known for their fine fruit and vegetables, particularly Condom, Nérac and Lectoure

Other products from local producers include:

- Armagnac brandy
- Côtes de Gascogne
- Floc de Gascogne
- Foie gras

== Sites of interest ==
- Fortified village walls (St Orens) - St Orens is enclosed by white stone walls (incomplete in sections) dating to the thirteenth century
- Château de St Orens (sixteenth century) - forming the western end of the fortified village, now containing the Salle de Fête (a function and exhibition space) and Mairie (mayor's office). The chateau was given to a lieutenant of the French gentleman soldier Blaise de Monluc, based in Saint-Puy.
- Château de Pouy-Petit (eighteenth century)
- Lavoir: a reconstructed washing area below St Orens, used by the villagers prior to modern plumbing
- Library
- Ceramics workshop and gallery
- Brocante
- Rare and vintage button shop
- Tennis court
- Boule patch

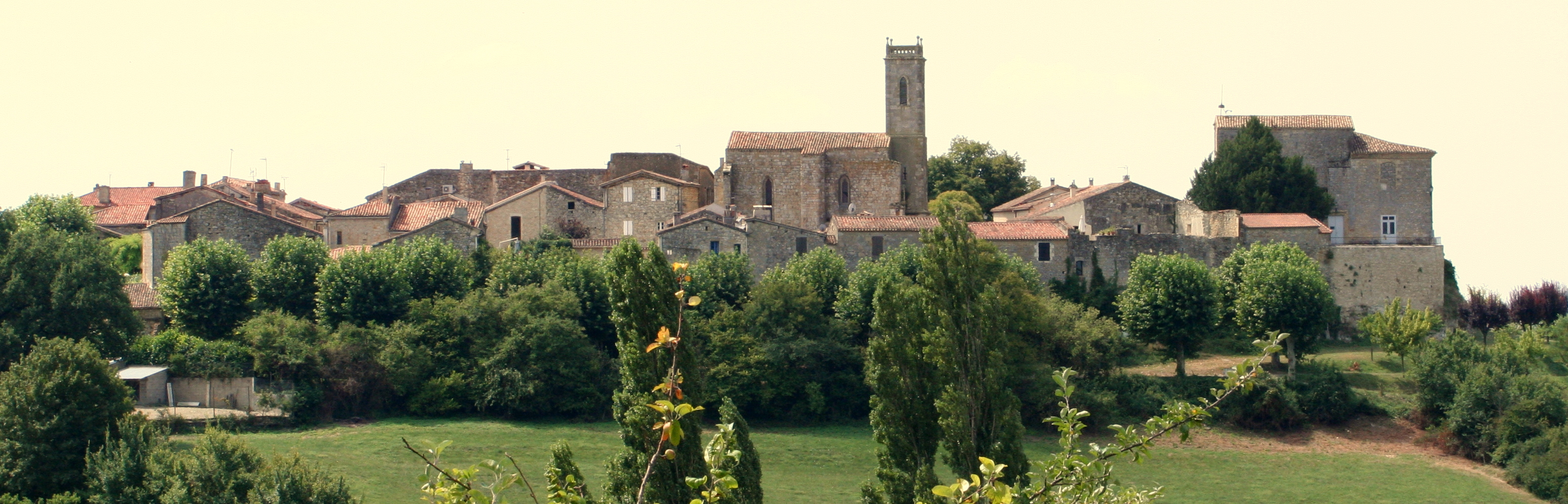
Saint-Orens from the north. The château is to the right.

== Arts ==
Like much of the Gers, St Orens had seen a slow period of decline through the twentieth century, leaving a number of properties in the village empty. An influx of newcomers and returnees in the 1970s and 1980s helped reverse this process. A number of these people were artists and artisans, creating a vibrant artistic community. The Salle de Fête regularly hosts arts exhibitions by local artists, and the nearby Musée d'Art Naïf (Béraut) complements this picture.

== Flora and fauna ==
Observed around the bastide:

Mammals

Coypu, various deer species, wild boar

Birds

Barn owl, golden oriole, hoopoe, black redstart, kestrel, common buzzard, black kite, greenfinch, rock bunting, pigeon

Butterflies

Orange tip, European peacock, southern swallowtail, clouded yellow, small blue, white admiral, red admiral, painted lady, Queen of Spain fritillary

== See also ==
- Communes of the Gers department
- Armagnac (province)
- Gascony
