= Canton of Baïse-Armagnac =

Administrative division of Gers department, France

Coordinates: 43.96°N 0.37°E

The canton of Baïse-Armagnac is an administrative division of the Gers department, southwestern France. It was created at the French canton reorganisation which came into effect in March 2015. Its seat is in Condom.

It consists of the following communes:

1. Ayguetinte
2. Beaucaire
3. Béraut
4. Blaziert
5. Castelnau-sur-l'Auvignon
6. Castéra-Verduzan
7. Caussens
8. Condom
9. Lagardère
10. Larroque-Saint-Sernin
11. Maignaut-Tauzia
12. Roquepine
13. Saint-Orens-Pouy-Petit
14. Saint-Puy
15. Valence-sur-Baïse
