= Saint-Sylvain, Calvados =

Saint-Sylvain
- Commune
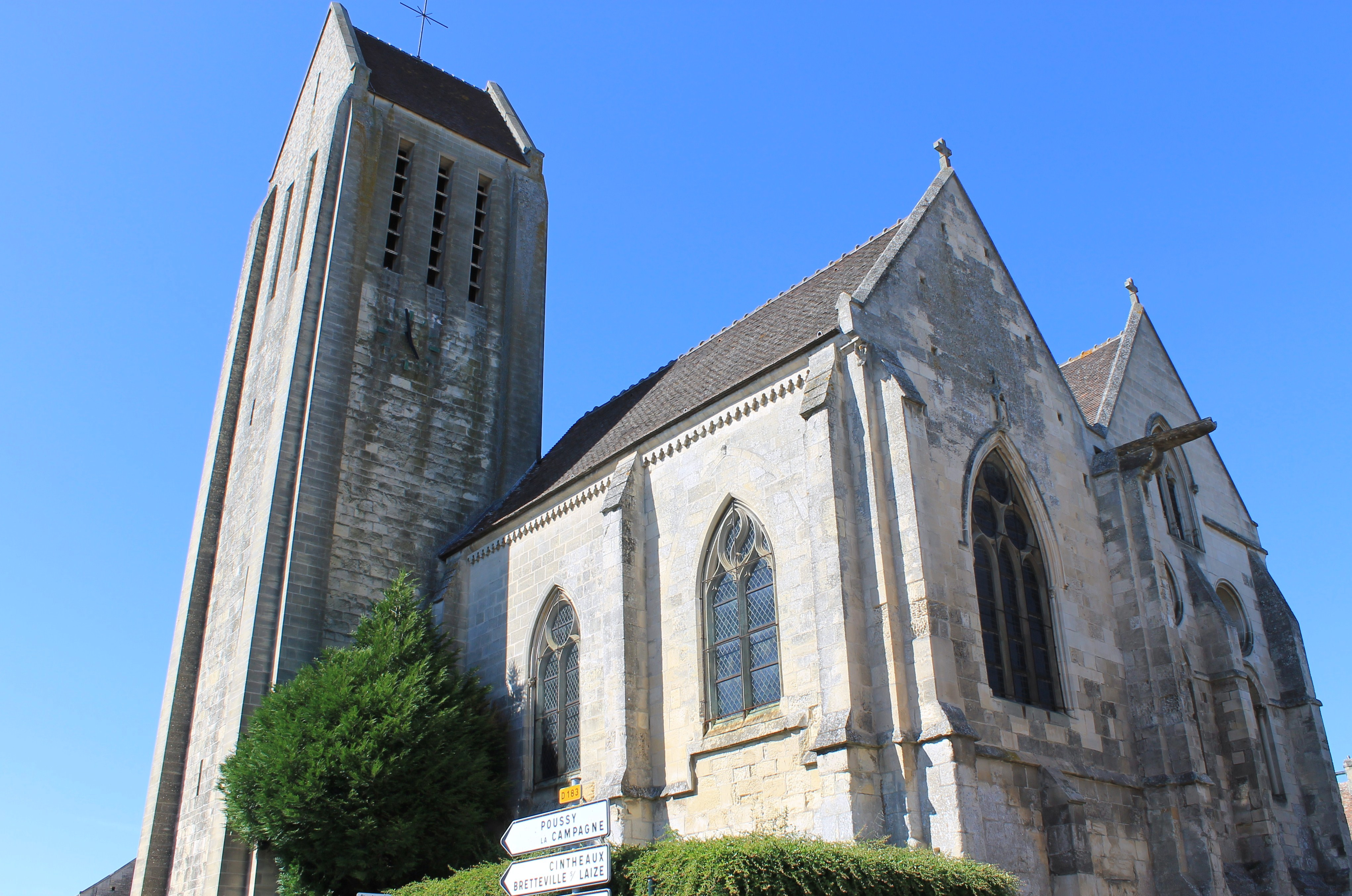
- The church in Saint-Sylvain

- Coat of arms
- Location of Saint-Sylvain
- Location within France Location within Normandy
- Coordinates: 49°03′25″N 0°12′57″W
- Country: France
- Region: Normandy
- Department: Calvados
- Arrondissement: Caen
- Canton: Le Hom
- Intercommunality: CC Val ès Dunes

Government
  - Mayor (2020–2026): Régis Croteau
- Area^{1}: 13.48 km^{2} (5.20 sq mi)
- Elevation: 38 m (125 ft)
- Highest elevation: 86 m (282 ft)
- Lowest elevation: 38 m (125 ft)
- Population (2023): 1,474
  - Density: 109.3/km^{2} (283.2/sq mi)
- Time zone: UTC+01:00 (CET)
  - Summer (DST): UTC+02:00 (CEST)
- INSEE/Postal code: 14659 /14190
- ^{1} French Land Register data, which excludes lakes, ponds, glaciers > 1 km^{2} (0.386 sq mi or 247 acres) and river estuaries.

Saint-Sylvain (French pronunciation: [sɛ̃ silvɛ̃]) is a commune in the Calvados department in the Normandy region in northwestern France.

== Geography ==
The commune is made up of the following collection of villages and hamlets, Rue Vilaine, Saint-Martin des Bois and Saint-Sylvain.

La Muance a tributary to the Dives flows through the commune.

== Population ==
Historical population
Year	Pop.	±% p.a.
1968	642	—
1975	715	+1.55%
1982	838	+2.29%
1990	850	+0.18%
1999	977	+1.56%
2007	1,204	+2.65%
2012	1,374	+2.68%
2017	1,435	+0.87%
2023	1,474	+0.45%
Source: INSEE

== Points of Interest ==
=== National Heritage sites ===
- Église de Saint-Sylvain thirteenth century church listed as a Monument historique in 1914.

== Notable people ==
- Pierre François Olive Rayer (1793 &ndash 1867) a French physician who was born here.

== See also ==
- Communes of the Calvados department
