= Dictionnaire de la langue française =

Dictionary of the French language

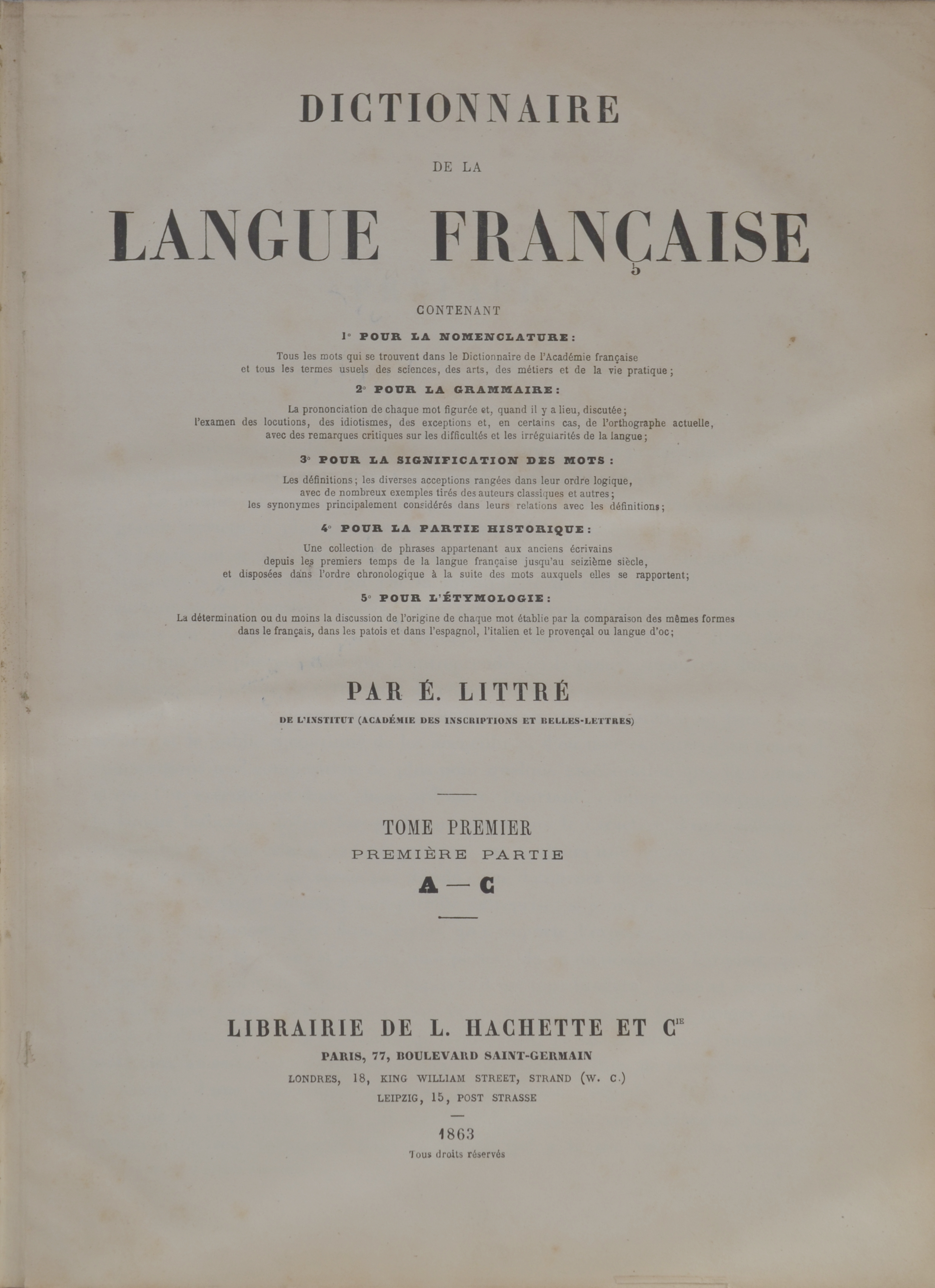

The Dictionnaire de la langue française (French pronunciation: [diksjɔnɛːʁ də la lɑ̃ɡ fʁɑ̃sɛːz]) by Émile Littré, commonly called the "Littré", is a four-volume dictionary of the French language published in Paris by Hachette.

The dictionary was originally issued in 30 parts, 1863–72; a second edition is dated 1872–77. A further edition is reported in 1877, published by Hachette.

Versions of Littré dictionary content that are searchable online (specifically, not of the type intended for download to physical devices) are available both on a site named after the dictionary's creator and on a multifaceted site including among its diverse resources its own adaptation of the dictionary.

The British Library's on-line integrated catalogue describes the contents as: 1o Pour la nomenclature...: 2o Pour la grammaire...: 3o Pour la signification des mots...: 4o Pour la partie historique...: 5o Pour l’étymologie..
