= Hermann Lebert =

German physician and naturalist

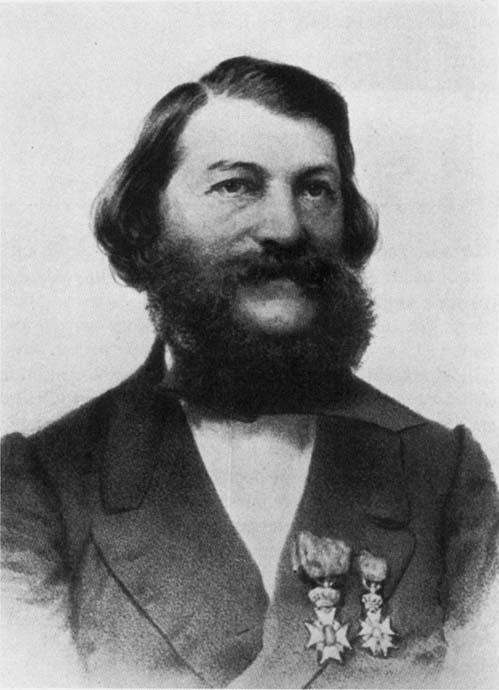
- Hermann Lebert
- Born: 9 June 1813; Breslau
- Died: 1 August 1878 (aged 65); Switzerland
- Known for: pathological anatomy
- Scientific career
- Fields: physician

Hermann Lebert (born Hermann Lewy; 9 June 1813 – 1 August 1878) was a German physician and naturalist.

== Biography ==
Lebert was born in Breslau. He studied medicine and the natural sciences first in Berlin and later in Zürich under Johann Lukas Schönlein. After he received his medical doctorate (Zürich, 1834), he traveled throughout Switzerland, studying botany. For the next year and a half he studied in Paris, particularly under Baron Guillaume Dupuytren and Pierre Charles Alexandre Louis. In 1838 he settled in Bex, later changing between Bex and Paris. From 1842 to 1845 he worked mainly in comparative anatomy, which had interested him during his travels as a student on the coast of Normandy and the Channel Islands with Charles-Philippe Robin.

On a government assignment, Lebert collected specimens for Musée Orfila. After a stay in Berlin during the winter of 1845–1846 Lebert settled in Paris, where he devoted his efforts to both his practice and scientific work. In 1853 he accepted an invitation to become professor of clinical medicine in Zürich, and six years later he moved on to Breslau, where he held the same job. In 1862, he was elected as a member of the American Philosophical Society. In 1874 he returned to Bex, Switzerland, where he spent the rest of his life.

Lebert was among the first to use the microscope in pathological anatomy, and thus contributed importantly to both pathology and clinical medicine.

== Selected writings ==
- Physiologie pathologique. 2 volumes and atlas. Paris, Baillière, 1845. (An early work on pathological histology that was instrumental in introducing the cellular idea of pathology).
- Traité d’anatomie pathologique générale et spéciale. 2 volumes. Paris, Baillière, 1857 and 1861. (Known for its excellent hand-coloured copperplate engravings of macro- and micropathology).
