= Dictionnaire Capuron-Nysten-Littré =

Dictionnaire Capuron-Nysten-Littré (Note: French pronunciation: [diksjɔnɛʁ kapyʁɔ̃ nistɛn litʁe].) ('Capuron-Nysten-Littré Dictionary') is the title given retrospectively to a single-volume French-language medical dictionary published between 1806 and 1908 in 21 successive editions, the first of which was written by Joseph Capuron and was published under the title Nouveau Dictionnaire de médecine, de chirurgie, de physique, de chimie et d'histoire naturelle ('New Dictionary of Medicine, Surgery, Physics, Chemistry, and Natural History').

With a title that gradually changed (see §§ Publication history and Summary table, below), and various nicknames given to it, this work was extensively revised, and at times entirely rewritten, throughout the 19th and early 20th centuries by various contributors (including Pierre-Hubert Nysten, Émile Littré, Charles-Philippe Robin, and Augustin Gilbert) up to its 21st edition, published in 1908. The designation "Capuron-Nysten-Littré" is the most comprehensive chronologically and the most concise, retaining only the names of authors appearing in first position on the title pages of the 21 editions.

According to Sacha Tomic, this dictionary, in its various editions, was complementary to encyclopedic dictionaries published in multiple volumes. According to Jean-François Vincent, this work was of great importance in its field, as a reference work owned and consulted by generations of physicians through its successive editions, and which evolved alongside medical knowledge.

== Publication history ==
Title page of the first edition

The first edition originated with an initiative by Jean-Antoine Brosson, a former naval physician who turned to printing after marrying the widow of printer Henri Chaudé. As Sacha Tomic explains, Brosson foresaw the need for a practical medical dictionary and approached the physician Joseph Capuron.

For the second edition, published in 1810, Brosson entrusted his stepson Jacques-Simon Chaudé with writing all the articles devoted to anatomy and surgery. At the same time, Chaudé was attending anatomy and dissection classes taught by Philibert Joseph Roux. Brosson also approached Pierre-Hubert Nysten, a French-Belgian physician who was then working as a préparateur in chemistry at the Faculty of Medicine, to contribute to the dictionary.

Capuron's name disappeared from the third edition, published in 1814 under the title Dictionnaire de médecine et des sciences accessoires à la médecine, for which Nysten was the sole credited author.

After the deaths of Nysten and Brosson, Chaudé had the dictionary reprinted several times, under the title Dictionnaire de médecine, de chirurgie, de pharmacie, des sciences accessoires et de l'art vétérinaire ('Dictionary of Medicine, Surgery, Pharmacy, Accessory Sciences and Veterinary Medicine'). The work continued to bear Nysten's name and, from that point onward, became commonly known as the Nysten.

After the ninth edition (1845), Chaudé sold his bookshop to J.-B. Baillière. The tenth edition appeared in 1855, consisting of a complete revision of the work carried out by Émile Littré and Charles-Philippe Robin, whose names were added to that of Nysten. (This edition and the subsequent editions produced by Littré and Robin are now commonly referred to as the Littré-Robin.)

The 1855 edition caused a scandal: Littré and Robin were accused of having infused the dictionary with materialism, a controversial doctrine at the time, which Nysten himself had opposed. Nysten's widow, unwilling to have her late husband's name associated with a materialist dictionary, initiated legal proceedings. In the 12th edition, published in 1865, the wording "par P.-H. Nysten" ('by P.-H. Nysten') on the title page was replaced with "d'après le plan suivi par Nysten" ('following the plan adopted by Nysten'). The courts ultimately ruled in favor of his widow, and Nysten's name was removed from the title page in the 13th edition, also published in 1865. On that occasion, the title was changed to Dictionnaire de médecine, de chirurgie, de pharmacie, de l'art vétérinaire et des sciences qui s'y rapportent ('Dictionary of Medicine, Surgery, Pharmacy, Veterinary Medicine, and Related Sciences').

Further editions appeared after Littré's death, with Littré's name continuing to appear on them, while Robin withdrew his own. The dictionary continued to be published after Robin's death. The words "veterinary medicine" were removed from the titles of the final two editions. The last edition, overseen by Augustin Gilbert (whose name was added to Littré's on the title page), was published in 1908.

The Littré-Robin had a competitor that was also widely circulated but apparently intended for a more modest readership: the Bouchut et Després, whose preface to the 1907 edition (the 7th edition) was addressed to "country doctors".

== Summary table ==
The 21 editions of the Dictionnaire Capuron-Nysten-Littré
Edition	Year	Title	Credited authors (Note: Following the order in which they appear on the title pages.)	Link
1st	1806	Nouveau Dictionnaire de médecine, de chirurgie, de physique, de chimie et d'histoire naturelle, où l'on trouve l'étymologie et l'explication des termes de ces sciences, avec deux vocabulaires, l'un grec, l'autre latin, et les synonymies relatives aux anciennes et nouvelles nomenclatures d'anatomie, chimie, botanique, etc. etc.	Capuron	
2nd	1810	Nouveau Dictionnaire de médecine, de chirurgie, de physique, de chimie et des autres sciences accessoires à la médecine, avec l'étymologie de chaque terme, suivi de deux vocabulaires, l'un latin, l'autre grec	1. Capuron; 2. Nysten	
3rd	1814	Dictionnaire de médecine et des sciences accessoires à la médecine, avec l'étymologie de chaque terme, suivi de deux vocabulaires, l'un latin, l'autre grec	Nysten	
4th	1824	Dictionnaire de médecine, de chirurgie, de pharmacie, des sciences accessoires et de l'art vétérinaire	1. Nysten^{†}; 2. Bricheteau	
5th	1833	Dictionnaire de médecine, de chirurgie, de pharmacie, des sciences accessoires et de l'art vétérinaire	1. Nysten^{†}; 2. Bricheteau; 3. Henry; 4. Briand	
6th	1834	Dictionnaire de médecine, de chirurgie, de pharmacie, des sciences accessoires et de l'art vétérinaire	1. Nysten^{†}; 2. Bricheteau; 3. Henry; 4. Briand	
7th	1839	Dictionnaire de médecine, de chirurgie, de pharmacie, des sciences accessoires et de l'art vétérinaire	1. Nysten^{†}; 2. Bricheteau; 3. Henry; 4. Briand	
8th	1840	Dictionnaire de médecine, de chirurgie, de pharmacie, des sciences accessoires et de l'art vétérinaire	1. Nysten^{†}; 2. Bricheteau; 3. Henry; 4. Briand	
9th	1845	Dictionnaire de médecine, de chirurgie, de pharmacie, des sciences accessoires et de l'art vétérinaire	1. Nysten^{†}; 2. Bricheteau; 3. Henry; 4. Briand	
10th	1855	Dictionnaire de médecine, de chirurgie, de pharmacie, des sciences accessoires et de l'art vétérinaire	1. Nysten^{†}; 2. Littré; 3. Robin	
11th	1858	Dictionnaire de médecine, de chirurgie, de pharmacie, des sciences accessoires et de l'art vétérinaire	1. Nysten^{†}; 2. Littré; 3. Robin	
12th	1865	Dictionnaire de médecine, de chirurgie, de pharmacie, des sciences accessoires et de l'art vétérinaire	1. Nysten^{†} (Note: Following the legal action brought by Nysten's widow against the inclusion of her husband's name on the title page, Nysten's name was retained in this edition, but with a restrictive wording: "d'après le plan suivi par Nysten" ('following the plan adopted by Nysten'). See § Publication history, above.); 2. Littré; 3. Robin	
13th	1873	Dictionnaire de médecine, de chirurgie, de pharmacie, de l'art vétérinaire et des sciences qui s'y rapportent	1. Littré; 2. Robin	
14th	1878	Dictionnaire de médecine, de chirurgie, de pharmacie, de l'art vétérinaire et des sciences qui s'y rapportent	1. Littré; 2. Robin	
15th	1884	Dictionnaire de médecine, de chirurgie, de pharmacie, de l'art vétérinaire et des sciences qui s'y rapportent	Littré^{†}	
16th	1886	Dictionnaire de médecine, de chirurgie, de pharmacie, de l'art vétérinaire et des sciences qui s'y rapportent	Littré^{†}	
17th	1893	Dictionnaire de médecine, de chirurgie, de pharmacie, de l'art vétérinaire et des sciences qui s'y rapportent	Littré^{†}	
18th	1898	Dictionnaire de médecine, de chirurgie, de pharmacie, de l'art vétérinaire et des sciences qui s'y rapportent	Littré^{†}	…
19th	1901	Dictionnaire de médecine, de chirurgie, de pharmacie, de l'art vétérinaire et des sciences qui s'y rapportent	Littré^{†}	…
20th	1903	Dictionnaire de médecine, de chirurgie, de pharmacie et des sciences qui s'y rapportent	Littré^{†}	…
21st	1908	Dictionnaire de médecine, de chirurgie, de pharmacie et des sciences qui s'y rapportent	1. Littré^{†}; 2. Gilbert	…

== Sources ==
- Albou, Philippe (2022). "Terminologie des infections avant et après Pasteur. À partir du Dictionnaire Capuron-Nysten-Littré (1806-1908)" (PDF). Histoire des sciences médicales (PDF) (in French).
- Chambat, Anaïs (2022). "La lignée « Capuron-Nysten-Littré » entre ruptures et continuités doctrinales". XX EURALEX International Congress (in French).
- Knibiehler, Yvonne; Fouquet, Catherine (1983). La femme et les médecins (in French).
- Milcent, Désiré-Alphonse (1856). Du Dictionnaire de Nysten, transformé en dictionnaire de médecine matérialiste par MM. Littré et Robin (in French).
- Saulnier, V. L. (1964). "Vigny et Renan: Centenaire de deux maîtres et d'une rencontre manquée". Revue d'histoire littéraire de la France (in French). Presses Universitaires de France. JSTOR 40522524.
- Tomic, Sacha (2018). "Le rôle des manuels dans la disciplinarisation de la toxicologie en France au XIX^{e} siècle". Philosophia Scientiæ (in French). doi:10.4000/philosophiascientiae.1332.
- Vincent, Jean-François (2024). "Comment faire du neuf avec du vieux : le Métadictionnaire médical multilingue, une nouvelle phase de la bibliothèque numérique Medica". Humanités numériques (in French). doi:10.4000/12ypo.
