= Blaziert =

- Commune
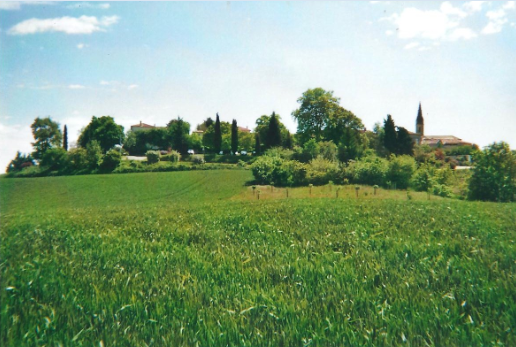
- A general view of Blaziert
- Location of Blaziert
- Location within France Location within Occitanie
- Coordinates: 43°56′06″N 0°28′39″E
- Country: France
- Region: Occitania
- Department: Gers
- Arrondissement: Condom
- Canton: Baïse-Armagnac
- Intercommunality: Ténarèze

Government
  - Mayor (2020–2026): Guy Noël Dufour
- Area^{1}: 10.97 km^{2} (4.24 sq mi)
- Elevation: 134 m (440 ft)
- Highest elevation: 222 m (728 ft)
- Lowest elevation: 111 m (364 ft)
- Population (2023): 126
  - Density: 11.5/km^{2} (29.7/sq mi)
- Time zone: UTC+01:00 (CET)
  - Summer (DST): UTC+02:00 (CEST)
- INSEE/Postal code: 32057 /32100
- ^{1} French Land Register data, which excludes lakes, ponds, glaciers > 1 km^{2} (0.386 sq mi or 247 acres) and river estuaries.

Blaziert (French pronunciation: [blazjɛʁ]; Occitan: Blasièrt) is a commune in Gers, a department in southwestern France.

== Geography ==
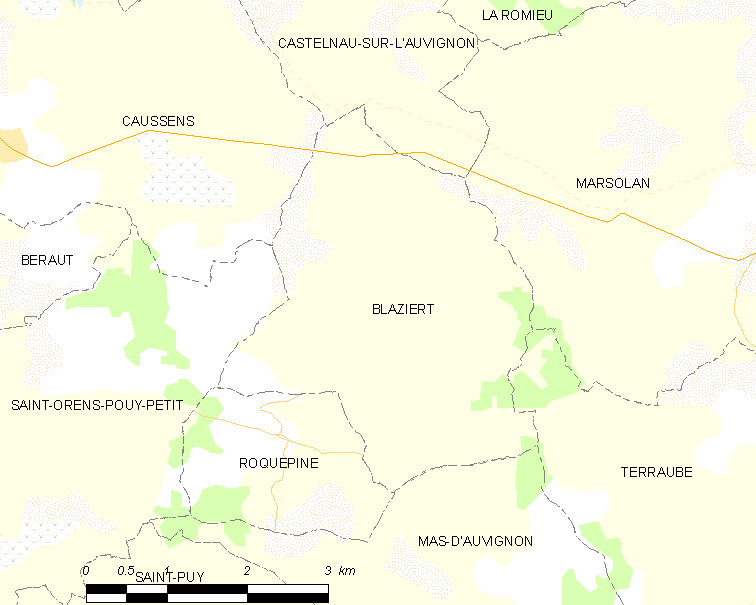
Blaziert and its surrounding communes

== Population ==
Historical population
Year	Pop.	±% p.a.
1968	200	—
1975	147	−4.30%
1982	138	−0.90%
1990	121	−1.63%
1999	124	+0.27%
2007	139	+1.44%
2012	139	+0.00%
2017	134	−0.73%
2023	126	−1.02%
Source: INSEE

== See also ==
- Communes of the Gers department
