= Pierre François Olive Rayer =

French physician

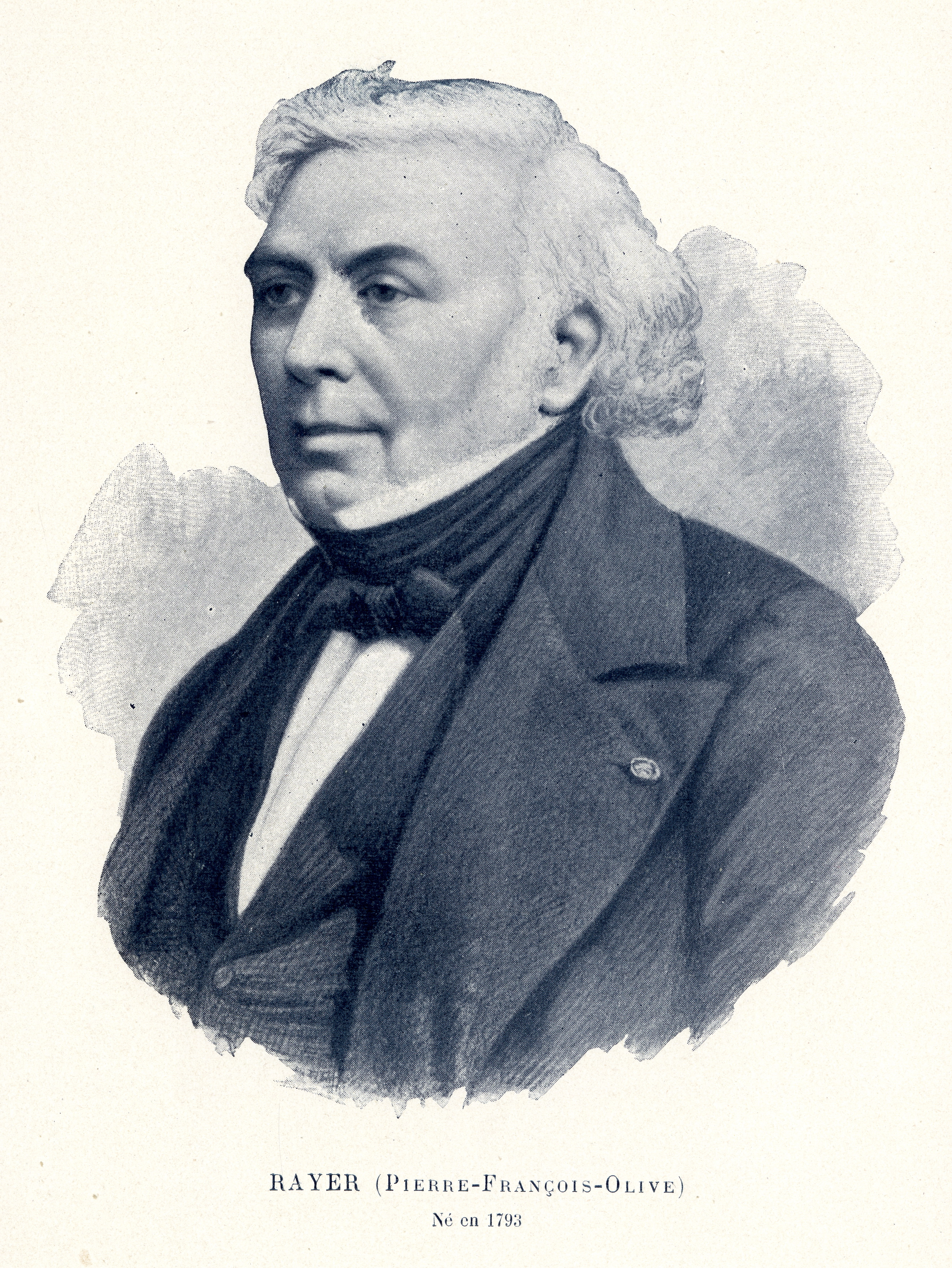
- Pierre François Olive Rayer
- Born: 8 March 1793; Saint-Sylvain, France
- Died: 10 September 1867 (aged 74); Paris, France
- Education: University of Caen Normandy
- Occupations: Dermatology, pathology, physiology
- Employer: University of Paris
- Organization(s): French Academy of Sciences, American Academy of Arts and Sciences, Académie nationale de médecine, German National Academy of Sciences Leopoldina
- Spouse: Aline Verdier of Lacoste

Pierre François Olive Rayer (French: [ʁaje]; 8 March 1793 – 10 September 1867) was a French medical doctor who was a native of Saint Sylvain. He made important contributions in the fields of pathological anatomy, physiology, comparative pathology and parasitology. He worked for the most part at the Hôpital de la Charité and became a professor of comparative anatomy at the Faculty of Medicine in Paris in 1862.

== Biography ==
Rayer was born in Saint Sylvain and little is known about his family. He studied medicine at Caen, and afterwards in Paris at the Ecole Pratique des Hautes Etudes and at the Hôtel-Dieu. As a student he went to Dijon to care for Spanish prisoners suffering from typhus. He became an interne of medicine in 1813. In 1814 he became a student of André-Marie C. Duméril and in 1818 earned his medical doctorate with a thesis titled ‘Sommaire d'une histoire abrégée de l'anatomie pathologique’. In 1821 he studied an epidemic of malaria in the countryside. In 1822 he was interested in studying an outbreak of yellow fever in Barcelona but he was denied permission to visit. He was more interested in academics than as a practitioner but his early attempts to apply for a career were thwarted. His name was removed from a list of candidates for concours de l'agrégation by Abbé de Frayssinous, Minister of Public Instruction, presumably as punishment for having married a Protestant. His private practice saw a large number of Protestant and Jewish patients. It was only in 1823 that he was made an assistant physician at the Academy of Medicine. Later on, he became a physician at Hôpital Saint-Antoine (1825), and at the Hôpital de la Charité (1832), and was also a consultant-physician to King Louis-Philippe. In 1842 his work on animal diseases led to hi being made chair of rural economy. In 1857 he was president of a committee on public hygiene and in 1859 he was president of the Association Générale des Médecins de France. In 1862 he attained the chair of comparative anatomy and was named dean of the Faculty of Medicine at Paris.

In 1826-27 he worked on skin diseases and published Traité théorique et pratique des maladies de la peau. In this work he was among the first to recognize skin lesions as markers of underlying diseases. In 1837 Rayer discovered that the fatal equine disease known as glanders was contagious to other species, including humans. He observed Bacillus anthracis under the microscope. Between 1837 and 1841 he published a three-volume book on diseases of the kidney titled Traité des maladies des reins. Along with Claude Bernard, Charles-Philippe Robin, Charles Edouard Brown-Séquard, François Follin and Charles-Nicolas Houel, he founded the Société de Biologie, serving as its first president in 1848. In 1850 Rayer published a paper that provided the first description of the anthrax bacillus (Inoculation du sang de rate, 1850). In this work he documented studies that he performed with physician Casimir Davaine (1812-1882) in regards to Bacillus anthracis. He was elected a Foreign Honorary Member of the American Academy of Arts and Sciences in 1855.

Rayer was a member of the Académie de Médecine and the Académie des Sciences, and co-founder of the Société de biologie, of which he was also president. He maintained friendships with several influential people in France, that included naturalist Isidore Geoffroy Saint-Hilaire, novelist George Sand and philosopher Émile Littré to whom he even lent money.

Rayer suffered ill health from 1867 and on 8 September he suffered a stroke and died 48 hours later at his home under the care of Casimir-Joseph Davaine.

== Eponyms associated with Pierre Rayer ==
- Rayer's disease: A disorder characterized by chronic jaundice, splenomegaly, and hepatomegaly.
- Rayer's nodules: A xanthoma; yellowish nodules on the skin (often on the eyelids).

== See also ==
- Timeline of tuberous sclerosis
