= Roquepine =

- Commune
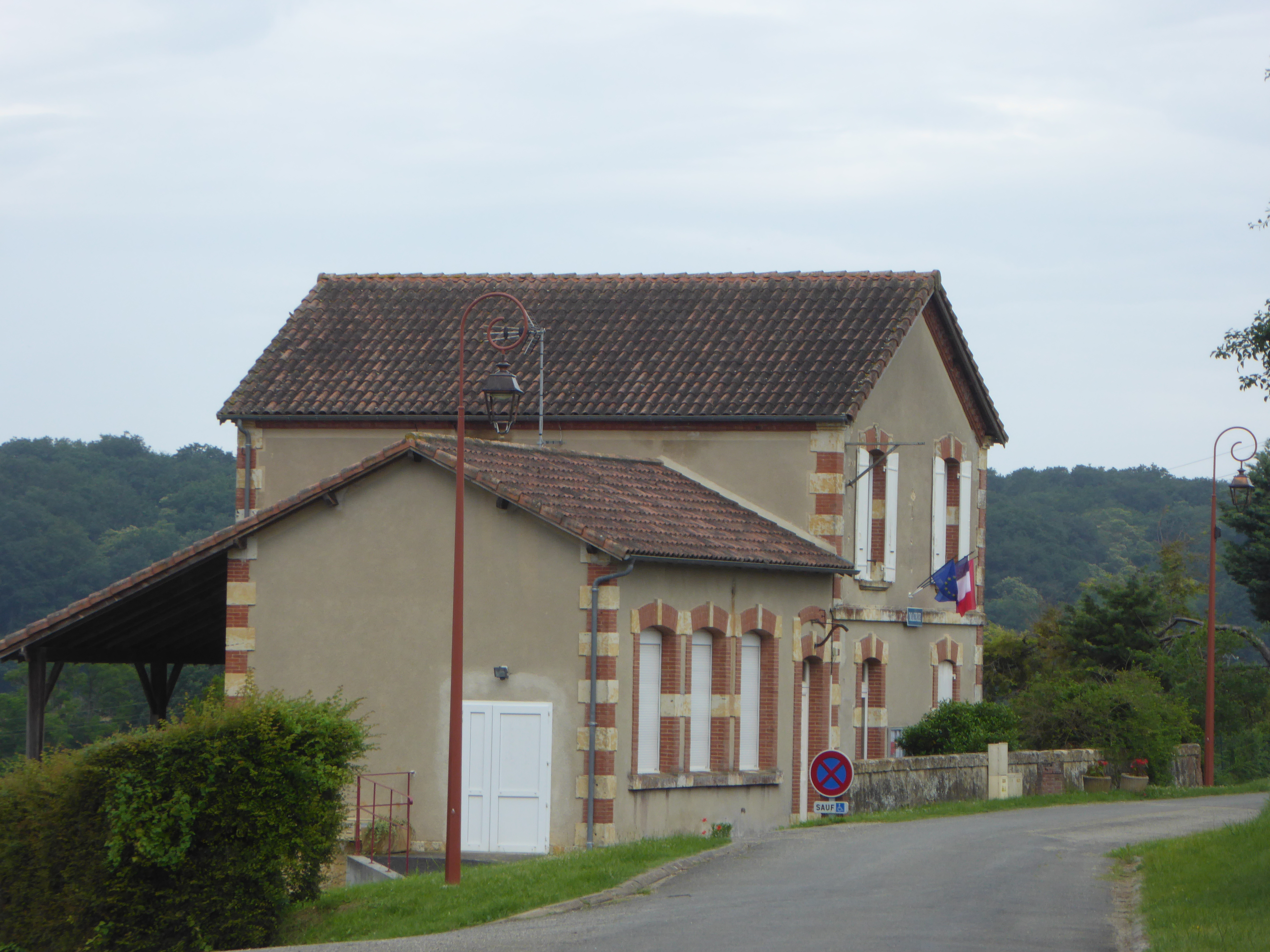
- Town hall
- Location of Roquepine
- Location within France Location within Occitanie
- Coordinates: 43°54′45″N 0°28′08″E
- Country: France
- Region: Occitania
- Department: Gers
- Arrondissement: Condom
- Canton: Baïse-Armagnac

Government
  - Mayor (2020–2026): Charles Labatut
- Area^{1}: 3.77 km^{2} (1.46 sq mi)
- Elevation: 215 m (705 ft)
- Highest elevation: 231 m (758 ft)
- Lowest elevation: 128 m (420 ft)
- Population (2023): 42
  - Density: 11/km^{2} (29/sq mi)
- Time zone: UTC+01:00 (CET)
  - Summer (DST): UTC+02:00 (CEST)
- INSEE/Postal code: 32350 /32100
- ^{1} French Land Register data, which excludes lakes, ponds, glaciers > 1 km^{2} (0.386 sq mi or 247 acres) and river estuaries.

Roquepine (French pronunciation: [ʁɔkpin]; Occitan: Ròcapina) is a commune in the Gers department in southwestern France.

== Geography ==
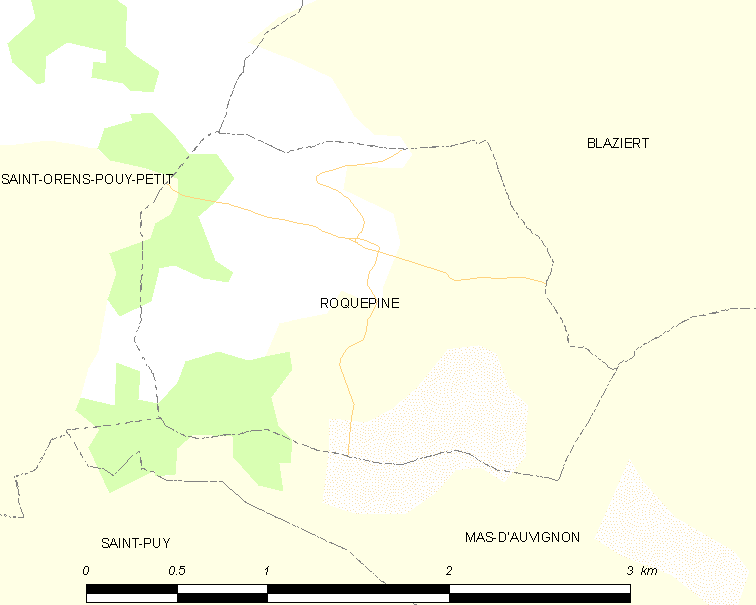
Roquepine and its surrounding communes

== Population ==
Historical population
Year	Pop.	±% p.a.
1968	77	—
1975	77	+0.00%
1982	77	+0.00%
1990	57	−3.69%
1999	46	−2.35%
2007	58	+2.94%
2012	52	−2.16%
2017	36	−7.09%
2023	42	+2.60%
Source: INSEE

== See also ==
- Communes of the Gers department
