= Ayguetinte =

- Commune
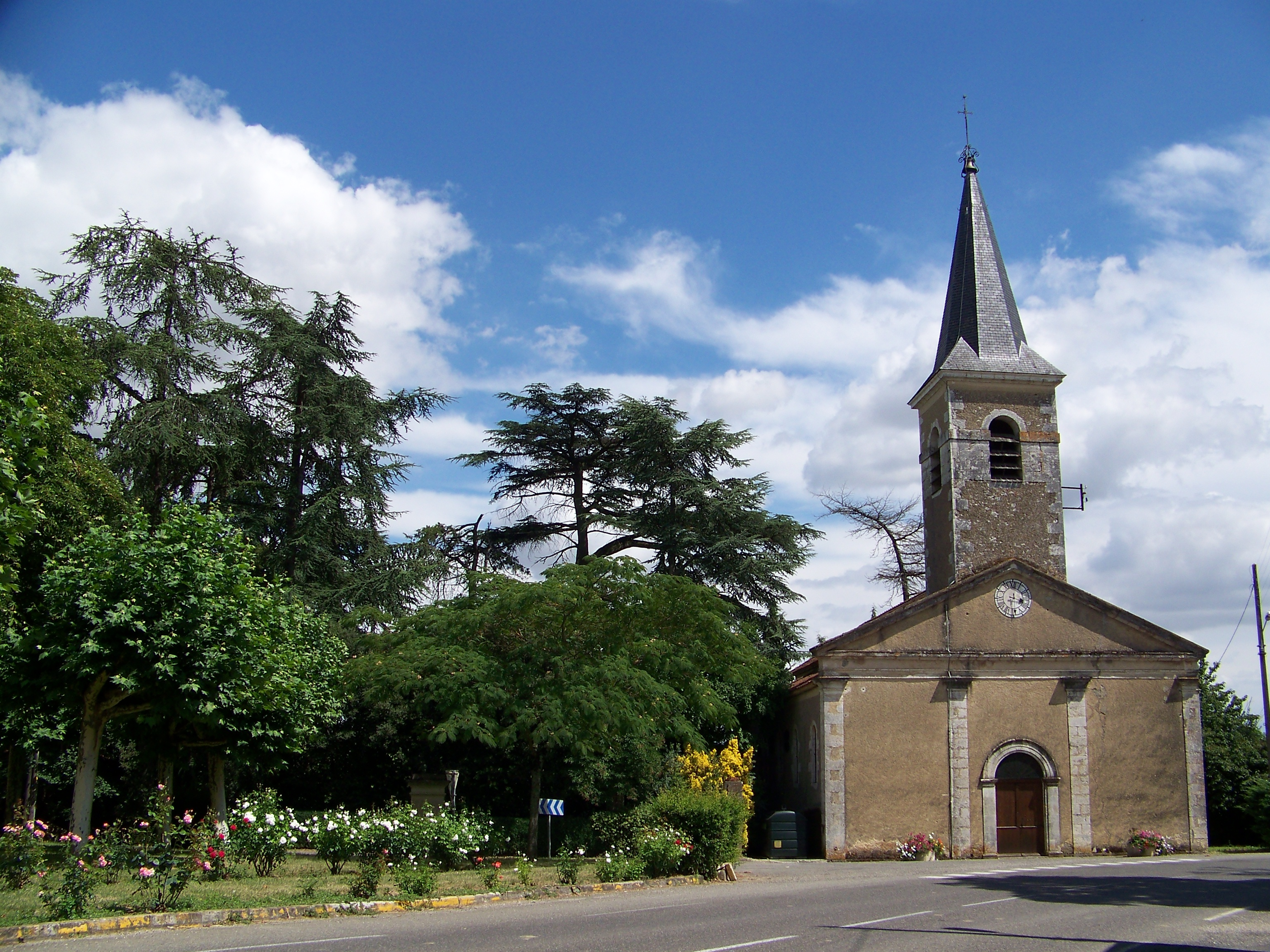
- The church in Ayguetinte
- Location of Ayguetinte
- Location within France Location within Occitanie
- Coordinates: 43°50′06″N 0°25′41″E
- Country: France
- Region: Occitania
- Department: Gers
- Arrondissement: Auch
- Canton: Baïse-Armagnac
- Intercommunality: CA Grand Auch Cœur Gascogne

Government
  - Mayor (2020–2026): Francis Ballérini
- Area^{1}: 6.31 km^{2} (2.44 sq mi)
- Elevation: 113 m (371 ft)
- Highest elevation: 203 m (666 ft)
- Lowest elevation: 96 m (315 ft)
- Population (2023): 156
  - Density: 24.7/km^{2} (64.0/sq mi)
- Time zone: UTC+01:00 (CET)
  - Summer (DST): UTC+02:00 (CEST)
- INSEE/Postal code: 32024 /32410
- ^{1} French Land Register data, which excludes lakes, ponds, glaciers > 1 km^{2} (0.386 sq mi or 247 acres) and river estuaries.

Ayguetinte (French pronunciation: [ɛjɡətɛ̃t]; Aigatinta (colored water) in Occitan language) is a commune in the Gers department in southwestern France.

== Geography ==
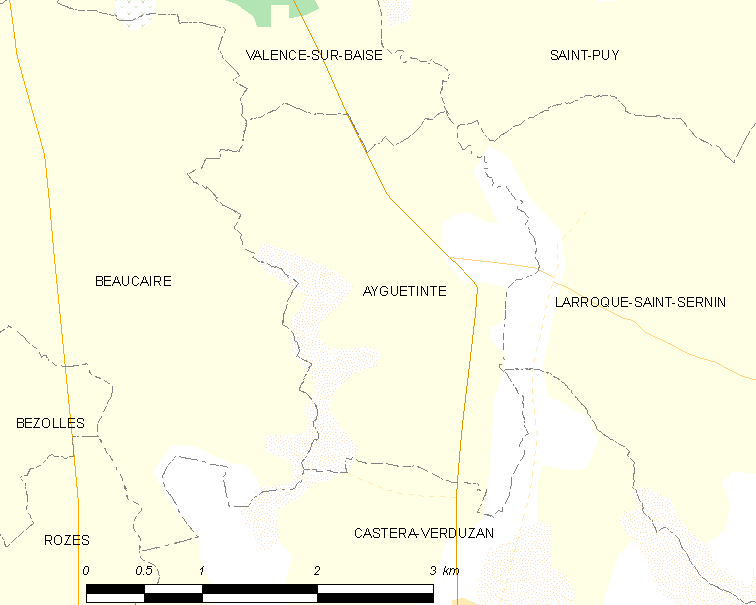
Ayguetinte and its surrounding communes

== Population ==
Historical population
Year	Pop.	±% p.a.
1968	199	—
1975	173	−1.98%
1982	172	−0.08%
1990	162	−0.75%
1999	152	−0.71%
2007	178	+1.99%
2012	182	+0.45%
2017	161	−2.42%
2023	156	−0.52%
Source: INSEE

== See also ==
- Communes of the Gers department
