= Grigory Vyrubov =

Russian philosopher (1843–1913)

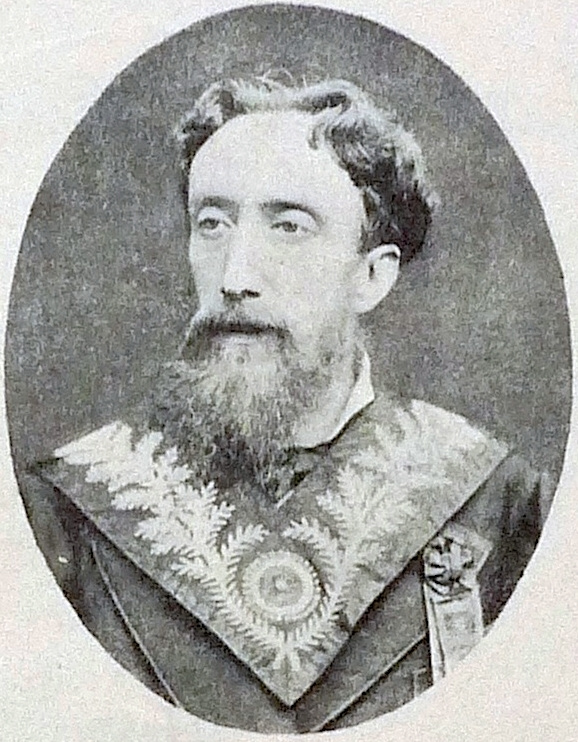
Grigory Vyrubov in Masonic attire with the insignia of the French Masonic Order

Grigory Nikolayevich Vyrubov, or Grégoire Wyrouboff (Russian: Григорий Николаевич Вырубов; 31 October 1843, in Moscow – 30 November 1913, in Paris) was a Russian Empire Positivist philosopher and historian of science.

== History ==
Born in Moscow, Vyrubov was brought up in Italy and France before studying medicine and natural philosophy at the University of Moscow. Heavily influenced by Edmond Nikolayevich Pommier, Vyrubov founded the Positivist journal Philosophie positive with Emile Littré in 1867: he edited the journal until 1881. He befriended Aleksandr Ivanovich Herzen, and edited anonymously the first edition of Herzen's works (10 vols, 1875–79).

In 1896 Vyrubov criticized Mendeleev's notion and statement of a periodic law, i.e., "all the properties of bodies are periodic functions of their atomic weights," citing the inversion of tellurium and iodine, which breaks the order of monotonically increasing atomic weights. He went so far as to say "I think that it is time to show clearly that there is nothing [here] which merits the name of law or system." Rethinking periodicity in terms of atomic number eliminates the problem, and the criticism was beside the point, since the notion of a periodic law had already saturated the field of chemistry.

Although he had never trained as a historian of science, in 1903 he was elected as Pierre Laffitte's successor to the chair of history of science at the Collège de France, and held the chair until his death.

Vyrubov was an active freemason. He was initiated into freemasonry on 7 January 1874 in Paris. He was initially a member of the Scottish Rite, but came into conflict with the Grand Lodge of France and switched to the Grand Orient of France (French Rite). He was the "Worshipful Master" of a lodge of Russian emigrants known as the "Rose of the Perfect Silence."
