= Caussens =

- Commune
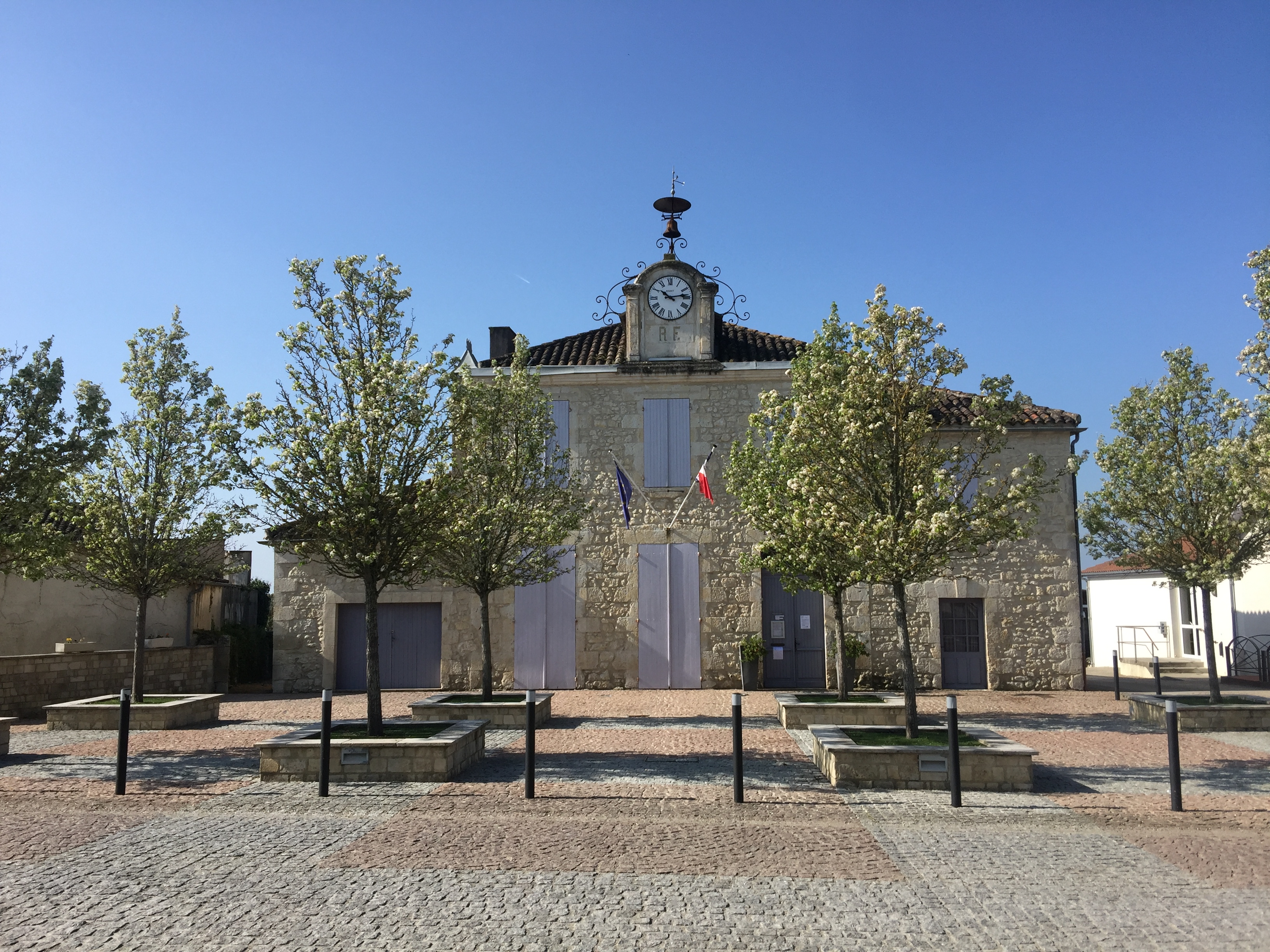
- Mairie de Caussens

- Coat of arms
- Location of Caussens
- Location within France Location within Occitanie
- Coordinates: 43°56′38″N 0°25′32″E
- Country: France
- Region: Occitania
- Department: Gers
- Arrondissement: Condom
- Canton: Baïse-Armagnac
- Intercommunality: Ténarèze

Government
  - Mayor (2020–2026): Denis Gaube
- Area^{1}: 13.27 km^{2} (5.12 sq mi)
- Elevation: 200 m (660 ft)
- Highest elevation: 205 m (673 ft)
- Lowest elevation: 102 m (335 ft)
- Population (2023): 598
  - Density: 45.1/km^{2} (117/sq mi)
- Time zone: UTC+01:00 (CET)
  - Summer (DST): UTC+02:00 (CEST)
- INSEE/Postal code: 32095 /32100
- ^{1} French Land Register data, which excludes lakes, ponds, glaciers > 1 km^{2} (0.386 sq mi or 247 acres) and river estuaries.

Caussens is a commune in the Gers department in southwestern France.

== Geography ==
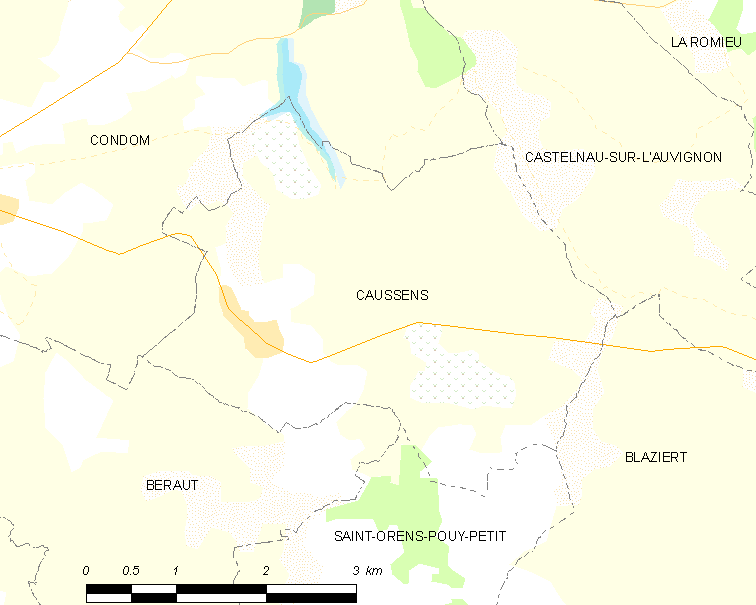
Caussens and its surrounding communes

== Population ==
Historical population
Year	Pop.	±% p.a.
1968	507	—
1975	469	−1.11%
1982	504	+1.03%
1990	557	+1.26%
1999	549	−0.16%
2007	632	+1.78%
2012	581	−1.67%
2017	619	+1.28%
2023	598	−0.57%
Source: INSEE

== See also ==
- Communes of the Gers department
