= Pierre-Hubert Nysten =

French physiologist and pediatrician

Pierre-Hubert Nysten (30 October 1771 – 3 March 1818) was a French physiologist and pediatrician who was a native of Liège.

== Biography ==
He studied medicine in Paris, and eventually became a professor at the École de Médecine in Paris. Shortly before his death, he attained the position of médecin-chef at the Hospice des Enfants Assistés (children's hospital) in Paris.

With Xavier Bichat (1771–1802), Nysten performed pioneer experiments in cardiology, including studies involving the effects of galvanic current on the heart. In 1805 he studied silkworm diseases in southern France, and provided an early description of polyhedrosis. He also described symptoms associated with albuminuria, and in 1811 provided a scientific description of rigor mortis. The eponymous "Nysten's Law" defines the progressive states of cadaveric rigidity during rigor mortis.

== Written works ==
In 1810 with Joseph Capuron (1767–1850), he published the second edition of the Nouveau dictionnaire de médecine, de chirurgie, de physique, de chimie et d'histoire naturelle, and in 1814 Nysten published a revised edition of the dictionary. He was also the author of the following:

- Nouvelles expériences galvaniques, faites sur les organes musculaires de l’homme et des animaux à sang rouge etc. Paris and Strasbourg, Levraux frères, 1803 – New galvanic experiments on muscular organs of humans and red-blooded animals.
- Recherches sur les maladies des vers à soie et les moyens de les prévenir etc. Paris, 1808. – Research on diseases of silkworms and means of prevention.
- Recherches de physiologie et de chimie pathologiques : pour faire suite à celles de Bichat sur la vie et la mort, 1811.
- Mémoire sur la roideur cadavérique qui survient aux corps de l'homme et des animaux après la mort, 1812 – On cadaverous rigidity that occurs in the body of man and animals after death.
