= Château de Lasserre =

Ruined castle in Occitania, France

Coordinates: 43°55′58″N 0°24′32″E

The Château de Lasserre is a ruined castle in the commune of Béraut in the Gers département of France.

With origins in the 14th century, the castle was adapted and altered in the 16th and 18th centuries. It has been listed since 1927 as a monument historique by the French Ministry of Culture. It is privately owned.

== See also ==
- List of castles in France
