= Castéra-Verduzan =

- Commune
- Coat of arms
- Location of Castéra-Verduzan
- Location within France Location within Occitanie
- Coordinates: 43°48′19″N 0°25′53″E
- Country: France
- Region: Occitania
- Department: Gers
- Arrondissement: Auch
- Canton: Baïse-Armagnac
- Intercommunality: CA Grand Auch Cœur Gascogne

Government
  - Mayor (2020–2026): Claude Nef
- Area^{1}: 19.82 km^{2} (7.65 sq mi)
- Elevation: 119 m (390 ft)
- Highest elevation: 221 m (725 ft)
- Lowest elevation: 97 m (318 ft)
- Population (2023): 1,041
  - Density: 52.52/km^{2} (136.0/sq mi)
- Time zone: UTC+01:00 (CET)
  - Summer (DST): UTC+02:00 (CEST)
- INSEE/Postal code: 32083 /32410
- ^{1} French Land Register data, which excludes lakes, ponds, glaciers > 1 km^{2} (0.386 sq mi or 247 acres) and river estuaries.

Castéra-Verduzan (French pronunciation: [kasteʁa vɛʁdyzɑ̃]; Occitan: Lo Casterar e Verdusan) is a commune in the Gers department in southwestern France.

== Geography ==
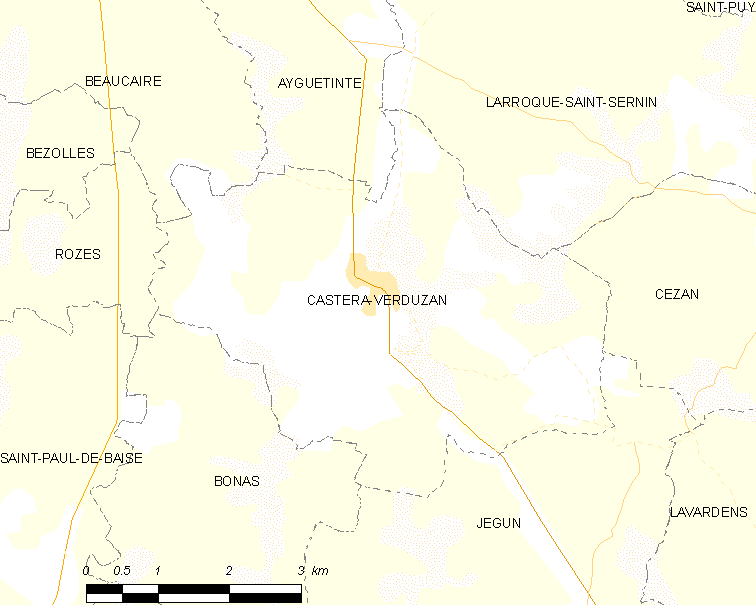
Castéra-Verduzan and its surrounding communes

== Population ==
Historical population
Year	Pop.	±% p.a.
1968	738	—
1975	719	−0.37%
1982	753	+0.66%
1990	794	+0.66%
1999	830	+0.49%
2007	912	+1.18%
2012	938	+0.56%
2017	988	+1.04%
2023	1,041	+0.87%
Source: INSEE

== See also ==
- Communes of the Gers department
