= Charles-Philippe Robin =

French anatomist, biologist, and histologist

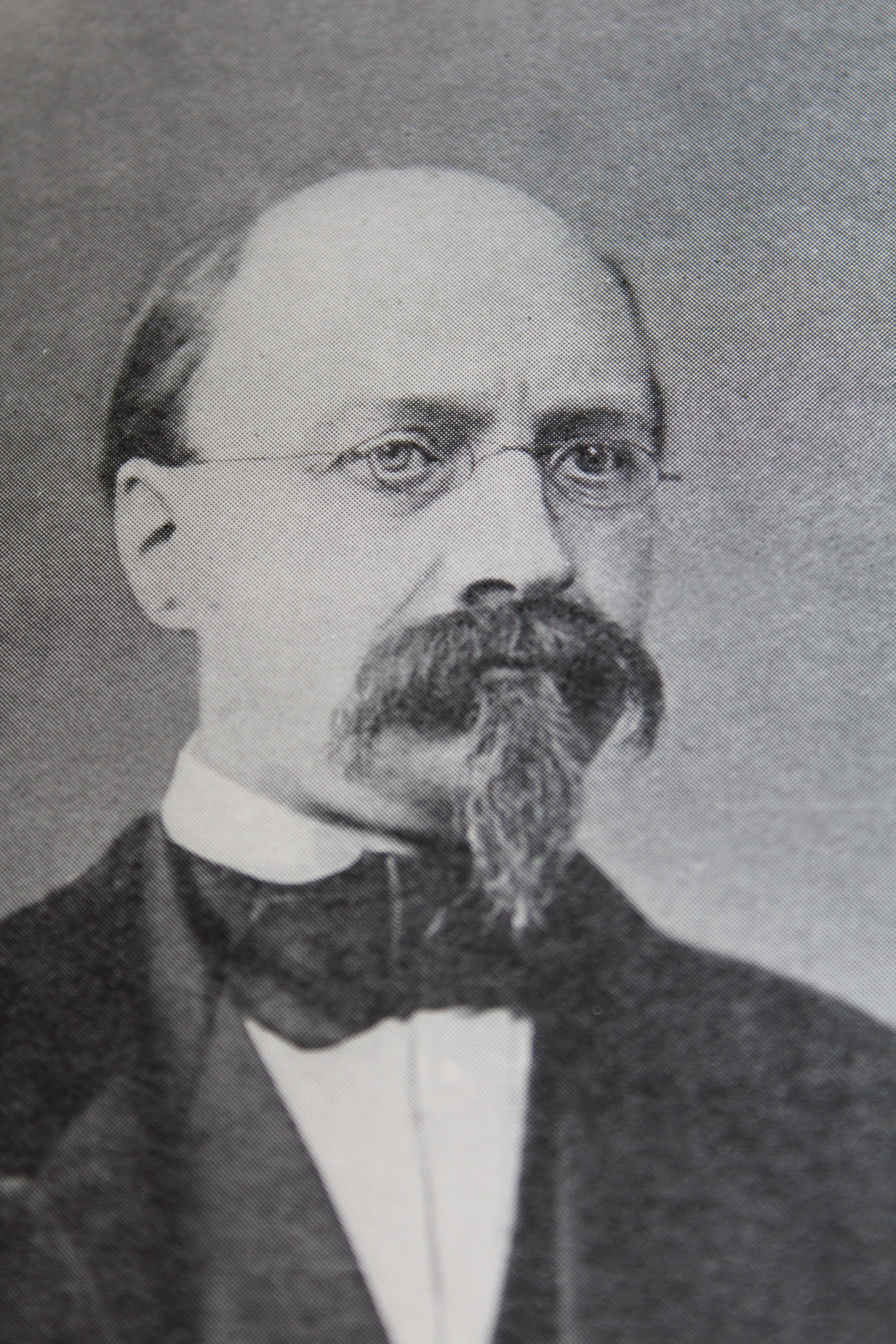
- Born: 4 June 1821
- Died: 6 October 1885 (aged 64)
- Citizenship: France
- Scientific career
- Fields: Anatomy, biology, histology
- Theses: Recherches sur un appareil qui se trouve sur les poissons du genre des Raies (1847); Des végétaux qui croissent sur les animaux vivants (1847)

Charles-Philippe Robin (French pronunciation: [ʃaʁl filip ʁɔbɛ̃]; 4 June 1821 – 6 October 1885) was a French anatomist, biologist, and histologist born in Jasseron, département Ain. He was a founder of the French Society for Biology in which he advocated positivist philosophy in scientific thought.

== Life and work ==
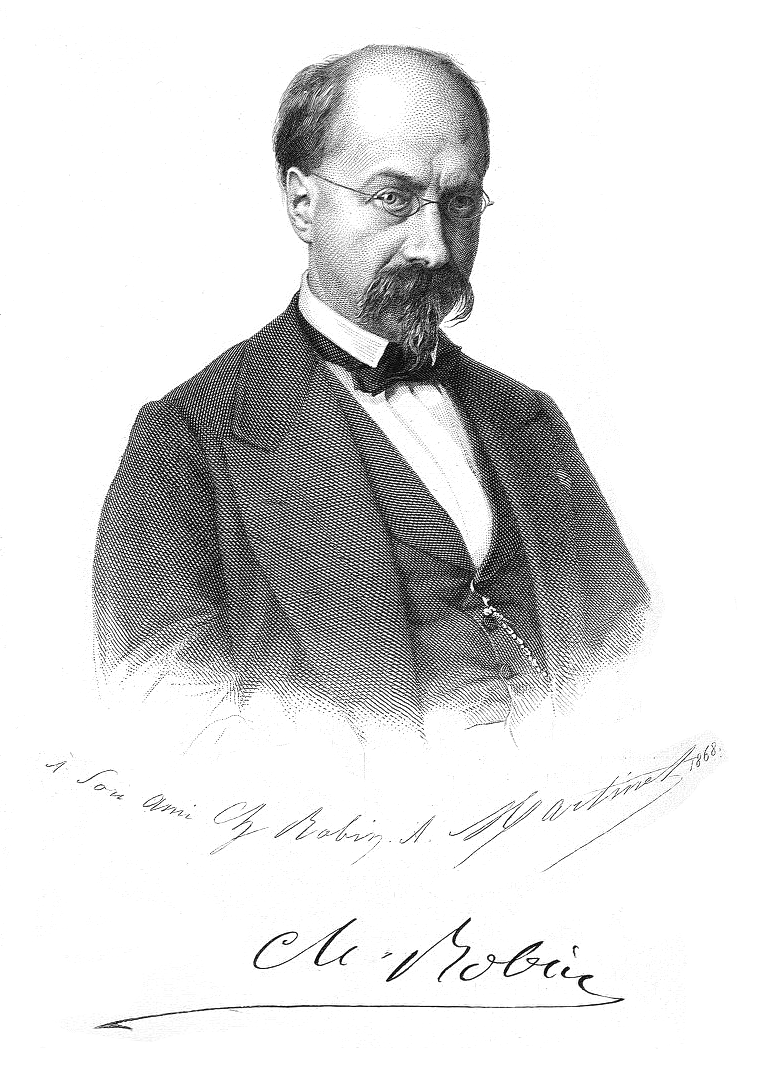

Robin was born in a wealthy family with many physicians particularly on the side of his mother Adelaide Tardy. He went to a boarding school at Menestruel, near Poncin, where he lost an eye which had to be replaced with a prosthesis. He then studied the classics at Collège Royal of Lyons and then in 1838 he went to study medicine in Paris. He was more interested in biological research than clinical medicine and while still a student took a scientific journey with Hermann Lebert to Normandy and the Channel Islands, where they collected specimens for the Musée Orfila. In 1846 he received his medical doctorate with a thesis on the topographical anatomy of the groin region. In 1847 his science doctorate included a thesis on the electric organs of the Rajidae and another on fungal parasites including Candida albicans. After his agrégation in natural history (1847) he conducted a course in pathology and had a comparative anatomy laboratory. In 1849 he replaced Achille Richard as professor of natural history at the Faculty of Medicine, Paris.

Robin's contributions to medical science were many and varied. He was among the first scientists in France to use the microscope in normal and pathological anatomy. He was the first to describe the species Candida albicans (a diploid fungus), and he contributed new information on the micro-structure of ganglia and of neuroglia. He also described the role of osteoclasts in bone formation, and he conducted original studies on the electrical organs of Rajidae (electric skates).

Robin was influenced by August Comte's positivist philosophy and he was able to give a unified view of the term biologie which had been introduced into French by Lamarck. With Pierre François Olive Rayer, Claude Bernard, and Charles-Édouard Brown-Séquard, he established the Société de biologie (1848). He was a member of the Académie Nationale de Médecine (1858) and Academy of Science (1866). During the Franco-Prussian War he was in charge of the army medical corps. In 1873 he was appointed director of the marine zoology laboratory at Concarneau where he worked with Georges Pouchet. In 1875 he was elected to the Senate for Ain. Around this time he began to question the cell theory, rebel against many scientific practices and refused to accept new discoveries.

Robin was a prolific writer, being the author of over 300 written articles during his lifetime. With Émile Littré he published in 1855 a revision of the dictionary now referred to as the Dictionnaire Capuron-Nysten-Littré. The eponymous Virchow-Robin spaces are named after him and pathologist Rudolf Virchow. Virchow-Robin spaces are lymphatic spaces between the vessels of the central nervous system.

== Selected writings ==
- Tableaux d’anatomie. Paris, 1851.
- Anatomie microscopique. 1868.
- Programme du cours d’histologie. 1870.
- Traité du microscope, son mode d’emploi, son application, 1871.
- Anatomie et physiologie cellulaire, animale et végétale. Paris, 1873.
- Mémoire sur le développement embryogénique des hirudinées. 1874.
- L’instruction et l’éducation. 1877.
- Nouveau dictionnaire abrége de médecine. Paris, 1886
