= Béraut =

- Commune
- Location of Béraut
- Location within France Location within Occitanie
- Coordinates: 43°54′56″N 0°24′10″E
- Country: France
- Region: Occitania
- Department: Gers
- Arrondissement: Condom
- Canton: Baïse-Armagnac
- Intercommunality: Ténarèze

Government
  - Mayor (2020–2026): Philippe Dufour
- Area^{1}: 12.43 km^{2} (4.80 sq mi)
- Elevation: 141 m (463 ft)
- Highest elevation: 207 m (679 ft)
- Lowest elevation: 82 m (269 ft)
- Population (2023): 299
  - Density: 24.1/km^{2} (62.3/sq mi)
- Time zone: UTC+01:00 (CET)
  - Summer (DST): UTC+02:00 (CEST)
- INSEE/Postal code: 32044 /32100
- ^{1} French Land Register data, which excludes lakes, ponds, glaciers > 1 km^{2} (0.386 sq mi or 247 acres) and river estuaries.

Béraut (French pronunciation: [beʁo]; Occitan: Beraut) is a commune in the Gers department in southwestern France.

== Geography ==
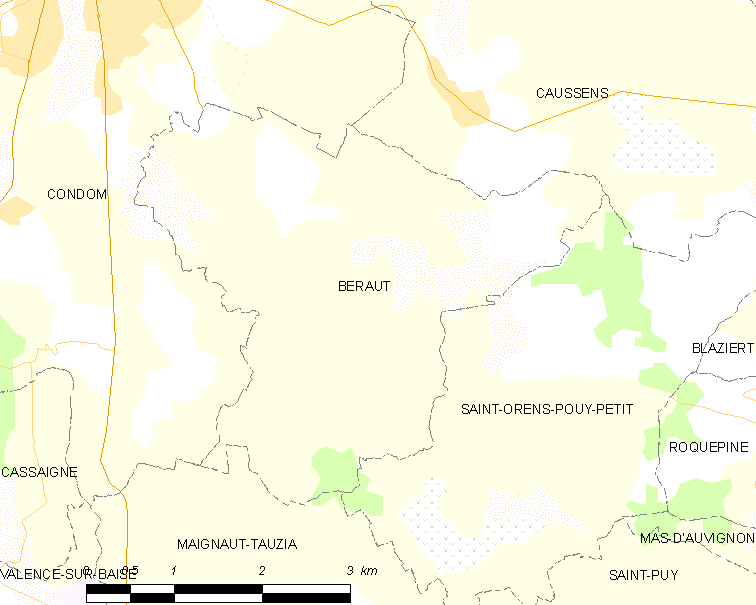
Béraut and its surrounding communes

== Population ==
Historical population
Year	Pop.	±% p.a.
1968	302	—
1975	261	−2.06%
1982	303	+2.15%
1990	306	+0.12%
1999	319	+0.46%
2007	337	+0.69%
2012	344	+0.41%
2017	331	−0.77%
2023	299	−1.68%
Source: INSEE

== Sights ==
- Château de Lasserre, 14th-century castle

== See also ==
- Communes of the Gers department
