= Le souper de Beaucaire =

1793 pamphlet by Napoleon Bonaparte

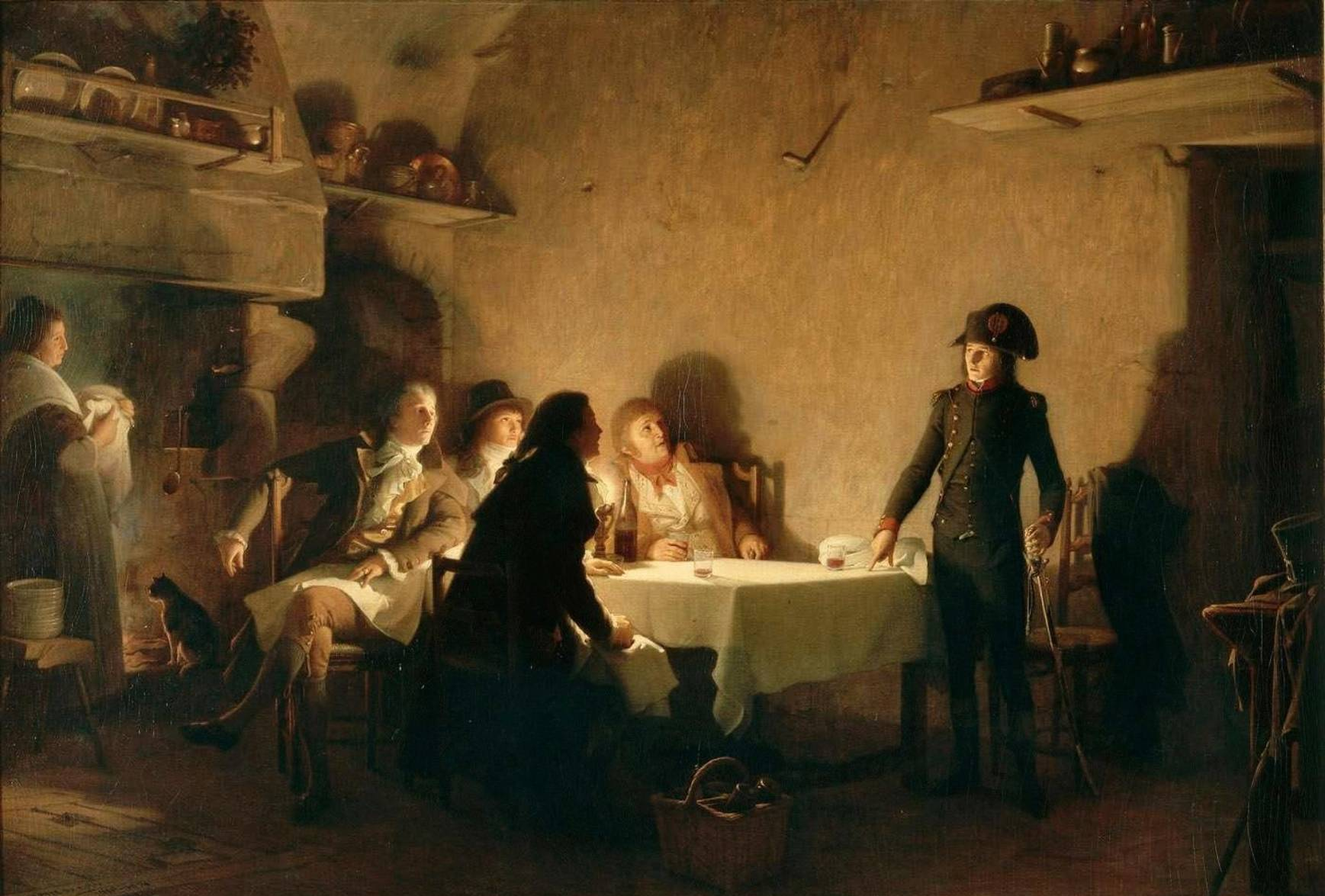
"Le souper de Beaucaire", depicting Bonaparte having the supper in Beaucaire on 28 July 1793, by Jean Lecomte du Nouÿ, 1869–94

Le souper de Beaucaire was a political pamphlet written by Napoleon Bonaparte in 1793. With the French Revolution into its fourth year, civil war had spread across France between various rival political factions. Napoleon was involved in military action, on the government's side, against some rebellious cities of southern France. It was during these events, in 1793, that he spoke with four merchants from the Midi and heard their views. As a loyal soldier of the Republic he responded in turn, set on dispelling the fears of the merchants and discouraging their beliefs. He later wrote about his conversation in the form of a pamphlet, calling for an end to the civil war.

== Background ==
During the French Revolution the National Convention became the executive power of France, following the execution of King Louis XVI. With powerful members, such as Maximilien Robespierre and Georges Danton, the Jacobin Club, a French political party established in 1790, at the birth of the revolution, managed to secure control of the government and pursue the revolution to their own ends, culminating in a "Reign of Terror". Its repressive policies resulted in insurrection across much of France, including the three largest cities after Paris, namely Lyon, Marseille and Toulon, in the south of France.

Citizens in the south were opposed to a centralised government and to the decrees of its rule, which resulted in rebellion. Prior to the revolution France had been divided into provinces with local governments. In 1790 the government, the National Constituent Assembly, reorganised France into administrative departments in order to rebalance the uneven distribution of French wealth, which had been subject to feudalism under the monarchical Ancien Régime.

== Rebellion in Southern France ==
In July 1793, Captain Napoleon Bonaparte, an artillery officer, was placed under the command of General Jean-Baptiste Carteaux to deal with rebels from Marseille situated in Avignon, where army munitions required by the French Army of Italy were being stored. On 24 July, Carteaux's National Guardsmen assaulted Avignon which was held by rebellious Guardsmen. They killed thirty citizens in cold blood during the attack before capturing the town and army supplies. Afterwards, Napoleon travelled to nearby Tarascon to find wagons with which to transport the munition. He visited Beaucaire, across the river from Tarascon, which had been holding an annual fair. Napoleon arrived on 28 July, the last day of the fair, and went to a tavern where he shared supper and conversation with four merchants – two from Marseille, one from Montpellier and another from Nîmes.

That evening Napoleon and the four merchants discussed the revolution, subsequent rebellions, and their consequences. Speaking as a pro-Republican, Napoleon supported the Jacobin cause, and explained the benefits of the revolution, whilst defending Carteaux's actions in Avignon. One of the merchants from Marseille expressed his moderate views regarding the revolution, and reasons for supporting civil war against a central government. The merchant stressed that Marseille did not fight for the Royalist cause, but opposed the nature of the Convention itself, condemning its decrees and deeming the execution of citizens as unlawful. Napoleon concluded that the people of Marseille should reject counter-revolutionary ideals and adopt the constitution of the French Republic in order to end the civil war and allow the regular army to restore France.

Following their conversation the group drank champagne until two in the morning, paid for by the Marseillais merchant.

== Publication and recognition ==
Shortly after the events, possibly on the 29 July whilst still in Beaucaire, Napoleon wrote a political pamphlet titled Le souper de Beaucaire (The supper at Beaucaire) in which a soldier speaks with four merchants and, sympathetic to their opinions, attempts to dissipate their counter-revolutionary sentiments.

The pamphlet was read by Augustin Robespierre, brother of Maximilien Robespierre, who was impressed by its persuasive revolutionary spirit. The pamphlet itself had little effect against the rebellious forces, but served to advance Napoleon's career. He soon became recognised for his political ambitions by a Corsica-born politician, and family friend, Christophe Saliceti, who arranged to have it published and distributed. Christophe's influence, along with fellow Convention deputy Augustin Robespierre, advanced Napoleon into the position of senior gunner, at Toulon.

In Memoirs of Napoleon Bonaparte, a biography by Napoleon's private secretary, Louis de Bourrienne, he notes that Le souper de Beaucaire was reprinted as a book – the first edition issued at the cost of the Public Treasury in August 1798, and a second edition in 1821, following Napoleon's death. He also states, "It was during my absence from France that Bonaparte, in the rank of 'chef de bataillon' [major], performed his first campaign, and contributed so materially to the recapture of Toulon. Of this period of his life I have no personal knowledge, and therefore I shall not speak of it as an eye-witness. I shall merely relate some facts which fill up the interval between 1793 and 1795, and which I have collected from papers which he himself delivered to me. Among these papers is a little production, entitled 'Le Souper de Beaucaire', the copies of which he bought up at considerable expense, and destroyed upon his attaining the Consulate."
