= Beaucaire, Gers =

Beaucaire
- Commune
- Location of Beaucaire
- Location within France Location within Occitanie
- Coordinates: 43°50′18″N 0°23′08″E
- Country: France
- Region: Occitania
- Department: Gers
- Arrondissement: Condom
- Canton: Baïse-Armagnac

Government
  - Mayor (2020–2026): Raymonde Barthe
- Area^{1}: 16.14 km^{2} (6.23 sq mi)
- Elevation: 97 m (318 ft)
- Highest elevation: 208 m (682 ft)
- Lowest elevation: 85 m (279 ft)
- Population (2023): 255
  - Density: 15.8/km^{2} (40.9/sq mi)
- Time zone: UTC+01:00 (CET)
  - Summer (DST): UTC+02:00 (CEST)
- INSEE/Postal code: 32035 /32410
- ^{1} French Land Register data, which excludes lakes, ponds, glaciers > 1 km^{2} (0.386 sq mi or 247 acres) and river estuaries.

Beaucaire (French pronunciation: [bokɛʁ]; Occitan: Bèucaire [ˌbɛwˈkajɾe]) is a commune in the Gers department in southwestern France.

== Geography ==
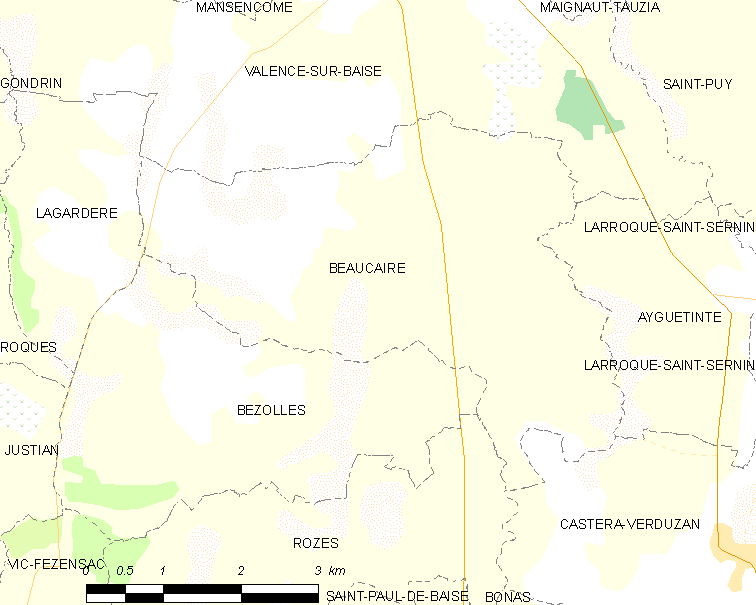
Beaucaire and its surrounding communes

== Population ==
Historical population
Year	Pop.	±% p.a.
1968	345	—
1975	312	−1.43%
1982	297	−0.70%
1990	305	+0.33%
1999	277	−1.06%
2007	287	+0.44%
2012	279	−0.56%
2017	256	−1.71%
2023	255	−0.07%
Source: INSEE

== See also ==
- Communes of the Gers department
