= Castelnau-sur-l'Auvignon =

- Commune
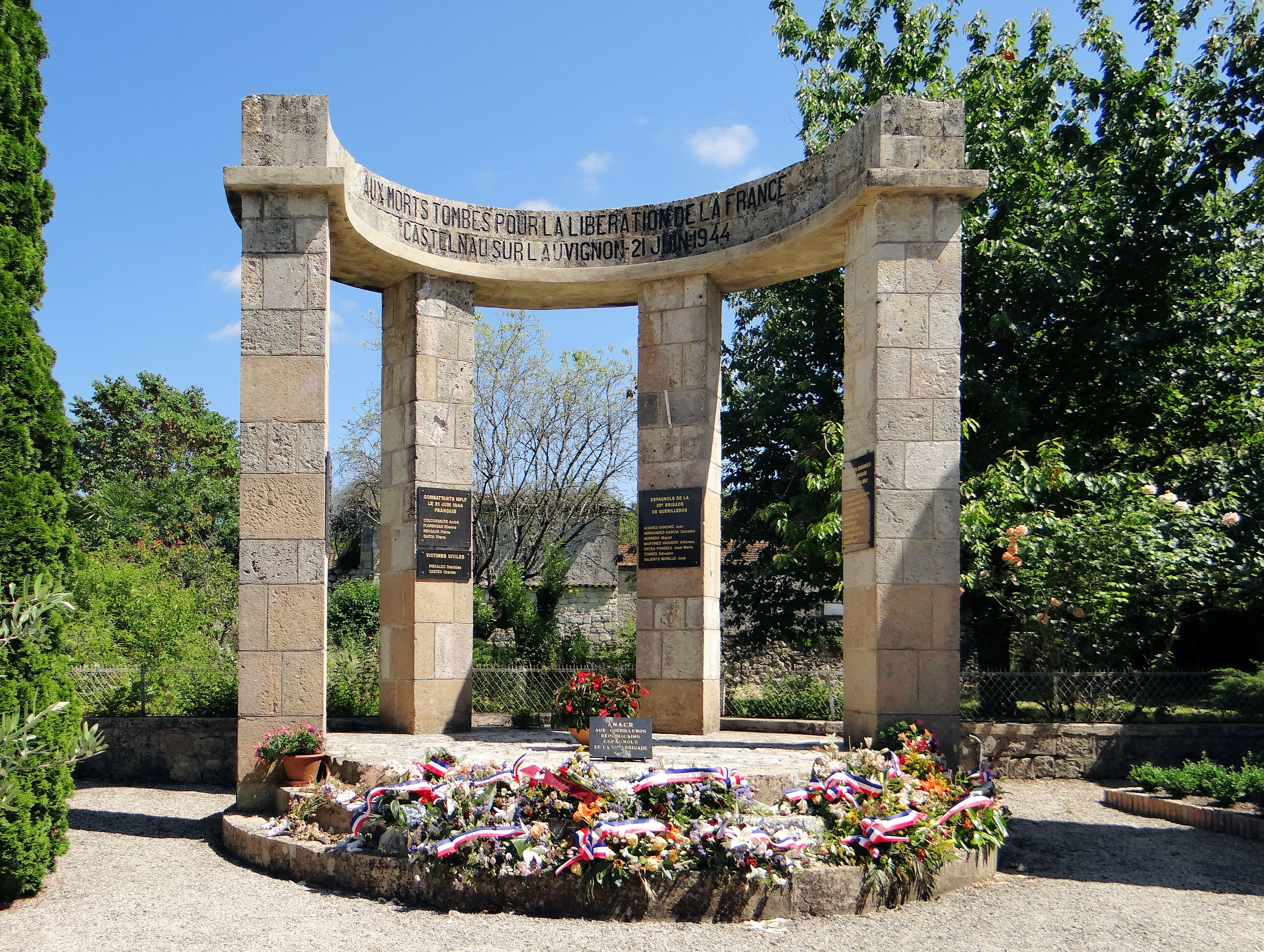
- War memorial
- Location of Castelnau-sur-l'Auvignon
- Location within France Location within Occitanie
- Coordinates: 43°58′22″N 0°27′28″E
- Country: France
- Region: Occitania
- Department: Gers
- Arrondissement: Condom
- Canton: Baïse-Armagnac
- Intercommunality: Ténarèze

Government
  - Mayor (2020–2026): Maurice Boison
- Area^{1}: 10.22 km^{2} (3.95 sq mi)
- Elevation: 166 m (545 ft)
- Highest elevation: 209 m (686 ft)
- Lowest elevation: 98 m (322 ft)
- Population (2023): 150
  - Density: 15/km^{2} (38/sq mi)
- Time zone: UTC+01:00 (CET)
  - Summer (DST): UTC+02:00 (CEST)
- INSEE/Postal code: 32080 /32100
- ^{1} French Land Register data, which excludes lakes, ponds, glaciers > 1 km^{2} (0.386 sq mi or 247 acres) and river estuaries.

Castelnau-sur-l'Auvignon (French pronunciation: [kastɛlno syʁ loviɲɔ̃]; Occitan: Castèthnau d'Auvinhon) is a commune in the Gers department in southwestern France.

== Geography ==
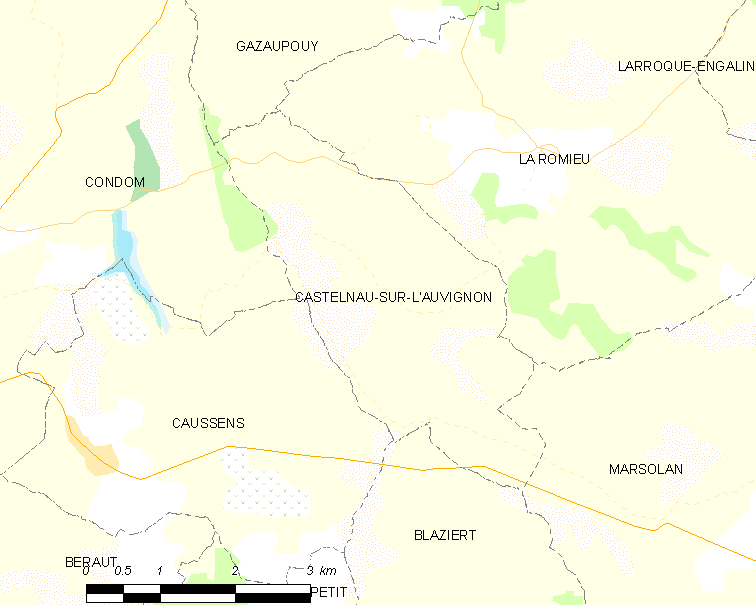
Castelnau-sur-l'Auvignon and its surrounding communes

== Population ==
Historical population
Year	Pop.	±% p.a.
1968	157	—
1975	147	−0.94%
1982	148	+0.10%
1990	139	−0.78%
1999	161	+1.65%
2007	153	−0.64%
2012	175	+2.72%
2017	147	−3.43%
2023	150	+0.34%
Source: INSEE

== See also ==
- Communes of the Gers department
