= Société de biologie =

The Société de biologie (French pronunciation: [sɔsjete də bjɔlɔʒi]) is a learned society founded in Paris in 1848. The society was conceived during the French Revolution of 1848. The members of the society held regular meetings and published the proceedings in a new scientific journal. The founding members of the society included Claude Bernard, the naturalist Charles-Philippe Robin, and the surgeon Eugène Follin. Its first president was the doctor and dermatologist Pierre Rayer.

Bernard was unanimously elected president of the society in 1867 upon Rayer's death. Historian Mirko Grmek said the society brought together the best physiologists and naturalists in Paris, and that Bernard regularly attended the weekly meetings. During 1849 he spoke at nearly all the sessions. Of the 227 scientific articles published by Bernard from 1848 onwards, 79 of them were published in the Comptes-rendus et Mémoires de la Société de Biologie. Marcellin Berthelot considered Bernard the "star and favourite" of the society.
