= Larroque-Saint-Sernin =

- Commune
- Location of Larroque-Saint-Sernin
- Location within France Location within Occitanie
- Coordinates: 43°49′35″N 0°27′57″E
- Country: France
- Region: Occitania
- Department: Gers
- Arrondissement: Condom
- Canton: Baïse-Armagnac

Government
  - Mayor (2020–2026): Juan Rodriguez
- Area^{1}: 17.96 km^{2} (6.93 sq mi)
- Elevation: 145 m (476 ft)
- Highest elevation: 232 m (761 ft)
- Lowest elevation: 95 m (312 ft)
- Population (2023): 162
  - Density: 9.02/km^{2} (23.4/sq mi)
- Time zone: UTC+01:00 (CET)
  - Summer (DST): UTC+02:00 (CEST)
- INSEE/Postal code: 32196 /32410
- ^{1} French Land Register data, which excludes lakes, ponds, glaciers > 1 km^{2} (0.386 sq mi or 247 acres) and river estuaries.

Larroque-Saint-Sernin (French pronunciation: [laʁɔk sɛ̃ sɛʁnɛ̃]; Occitan: La Ròca Sent Sarnin) is a commune in the Gers department in southwestern France.

== Geography ==
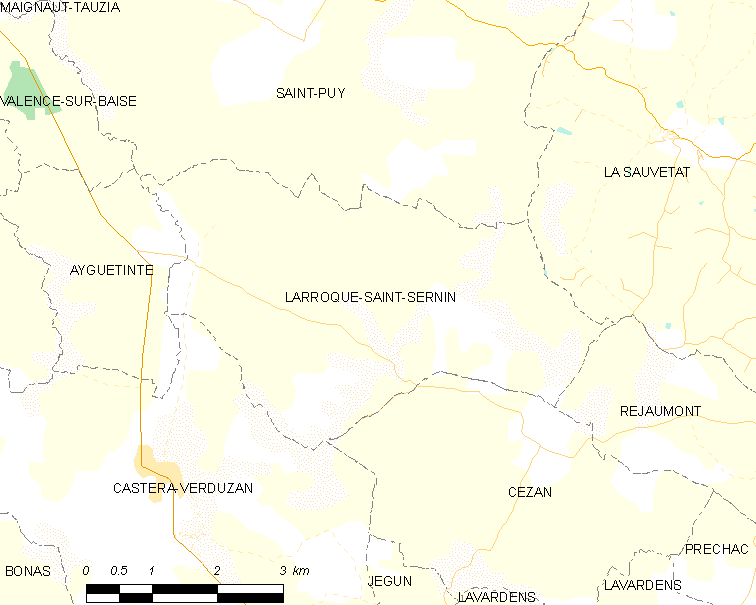
Larroque- Saint-Sernin and its surrounding communes

== Population ==
Historical population
Year	Pop.	±% p.a.
1968	252	—
1975	200	−3.25%
1982	197	−0.22%
1990	178	−1.26%
1999	183	+0.31%
2007	164	−1.36%
2012	170	+0.72%
2017	167	−0.36%
2023	162	−0.51%
Source: INSEE

== See also ==
- Communes of the Gers department
