= Lagardère, Gers =

Lagardère
- Commune
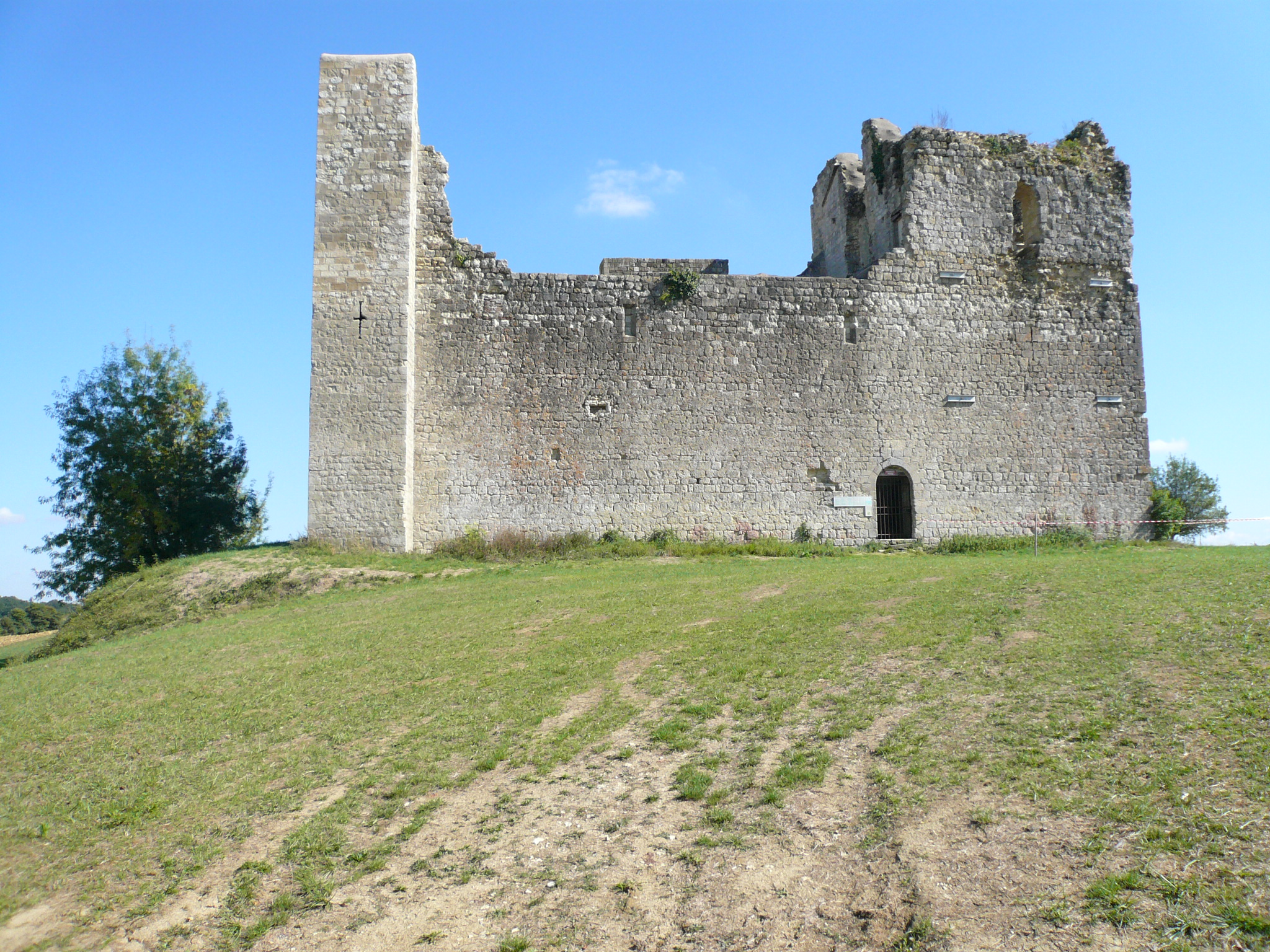
- The chateau in Lagardère
- Location of Lagardère
- Location within France Location within Occitanie
- Coordinates: 43°50′28″N 0°19′43″E
- Country: France
- Region: Occitania
- Department: Gers
- Arrondissement: Condom
- Canton: Baïse-Armagnac

Government
  - Mayor (2020–2026): Patrick Dubos
- Area^{1}: 4.95 km^{2} (1.91 sq mi)
- Elevation: 201 m (659 ft)
- Highest elevation: 222 m (728 ft)
- Lowest elevation: 118 m (387 ft)
- Population (2023): 77
  - Density: 16/km^{2} (40/sq mi)
- Time zone: UTC+01:00 (CET)
  - Summer (DST): UTC+02:00 (CEST)
- INSEE/Postal code: 32178 /32310
- ^{1} French Land Register data, which excludes lakes, ponds, glaciers > 1 km^{2} (0.386 sq mi or 247 acres) and river estuaries.

Lagardère (French pronunciation: [laɡaʁdɛʁ]; Occitan: La Guardèra) is a commune in the Gers department in southwestern France.

== Geography ==
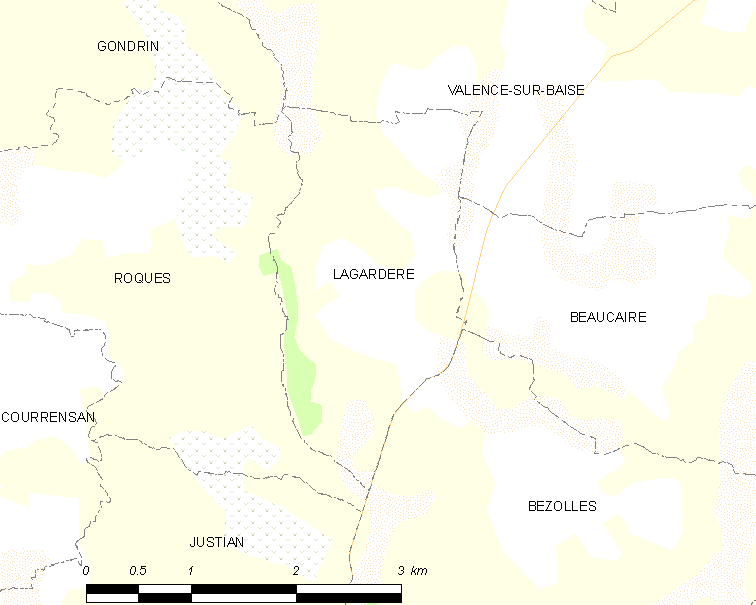
Lagardère and its surrounding communes

== Population ==
Historical population
Year	Pop.	±% p.a.
1968	81	—
1975	81	+0.00%
1982	75	−1.09%
1990	58	−3.16%
1999	55	−0.59%
2007	66	+2.31%
2012	81	+4.18%
2017	78	−0.75%
2023	77	−0.21%
Source: INSEE

== See also ==
- Communes of the Gers department
