= Historia abbatiae Condomensis =

Chronicle of the history of Saint-Pierre de Condom

The Historia abbatiae Condomensis, nunc episcopatus ("History of the Abbey of Condom, now a Bishopric") is a chronicle of the history of Saint-Pierre de Condom, an abbey from the ninth century, rebuilt in 1040 and converted into the seat of the Diocese of Condom in 1317. It was written early in the fourteenth century by an anonymous monk of the abbey, drawing extensively on the abbey's cartulary and necrology. Its account of the abbey's origins, however, is unreliable.

== Editions ==
- d'Achery, Luc. "Historia abbatiae Condomensis, nunc episcopatus". Spicilegium, vol. 2, pp. 580–602. Paris: 1723.
