= Condom, Gers =

Condom
- Subprefecture and commune
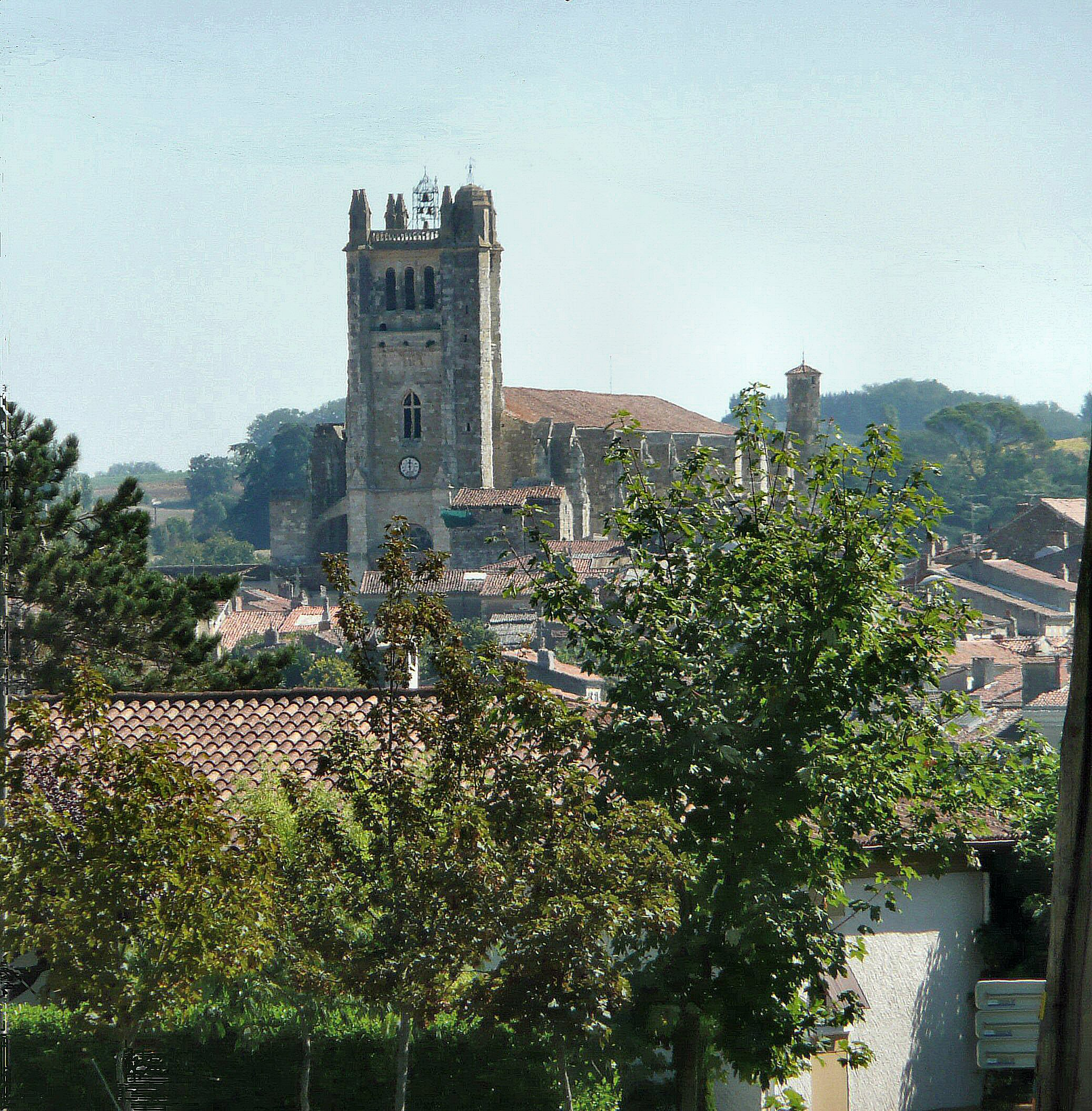
- Condom Cathedral

- Coat of arms
- Location of Condom
- Location within France Location within Occitanie
- Coordinates: 43°58′N 0°22′E
- Country: France
- Region: Occitania
- Department: Gers
- Arrondissement: Condom
- Canton: Baïse-Armagnac
- Intercommunality: La Ténarèze

Government
  - Mayor (2020–2026): Jean-François Rousse
- Area^{1}: 97.37 km^{2} (37.59 sq mi)
- Elevation: 82 m (269 ft)
- Highest elevation: 190 m (620 ft)
- Lowest elevation: 62 m (203 ft)
- Population (2023): 6,473
  - Density: 66.48/km^{2} (172.2/sq mi)
- Time zone: UTC+01:00 (CET)
  - Summer (DST): UTC+02:00 (CEST)
- INSEE/Postal code: 32107 /32100
- ^{1} French Land Register data, which excludes lakes, ponds, glaciers > 1 km^{2} (0.386 sq mi or 247 acres) and river estuaries.

Condom (French pronunciation: [kɔ̃dɔ̃]; Occitan: Condòm), also known as Condom-en-Armagnac, is a commune in southwestern France in the department of Gers, of which it is a subprefecture.

== History ==
The site is occupied in the protohistoric period. The Agen Museum retains, under inventory number 134 A2, a flat copper axe, going up to the Middle Bronze, found at Condom. Legend has it that a nobleman returning from Palestine was sent by a pope, with relics of the cross, to a wooded area, to found a city on a hill. However, excavations have shown that people inhabited the city long before the Roman invasion.

The origin of the city is subject to discussion. Some trace it back to the seizure of power of the Duke of Aquitaine, Eudes of Aquitaine, on Gascony, at the end of the 7th century. He would then distribute land to the Gascons who would have helped him. Later a Duke of Aquitaine, his mother and his wife, whom the tradition calls Egalsius or Algasius, whose existence is perfectly unknown, Ysemburge and Agnès, would have built a chapel on the site. Some religious have come to settle there to found a monastery. This monastery was destroyed by the Vikings.

It was around 930, that the wife of the Duke of Gascogne Garcia Sanche the Courbé or the Tors, Honorette (or Honorée), undertook to rebuild the church of Condom and the dota of land. She also built mansions for the new inhabitants of the village. She died wanting to see a miraculous urn that was in the church and gave birth to Arnaud or Nonné, the first Earl of Astarac.

== Geography ==
=== Localisation ===
The town of Condom is located in the northern part of the department of Gers, halfway between Mont-de-Marsan (to the west) and Montauban (to the east), and north of Auch.

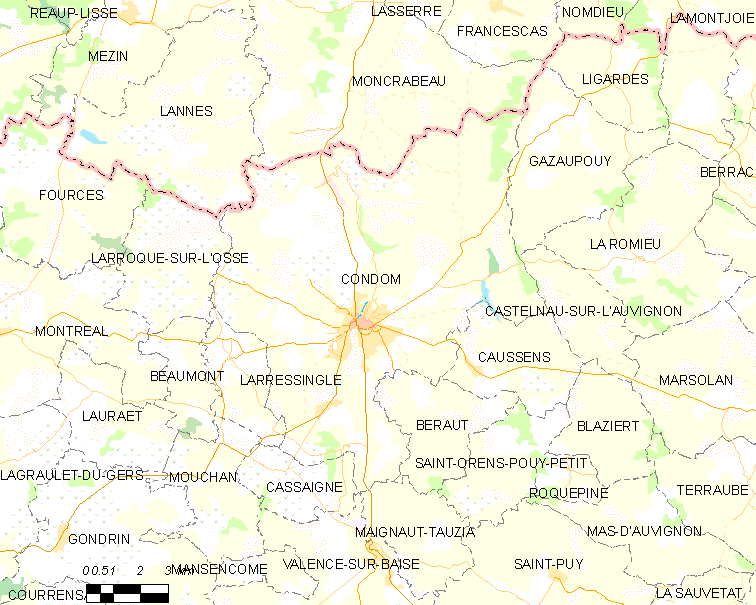
Condom and its surrounding communes

=== Roads and transports ===
Way of St. James

Condom is a town on the Via Podiensis, one of the three major French arms of the pilgrimage route, the Way of St. James.

This particular route begins in Le Puy and ends in Santiago de Compostela in northwest Spain. Pilgrims arrive at Condom after Miradoux and continue on to Larressingle.

== Toponymy ==
The toponym Condom comes from the Gaulish words condate and magos combined into Condatomagos, which means "market or field, of the confluence".

Condatómagos evolved into Condatóm and then into Conddóm. Condom was first recorded in Latin in the 10th century as Condomus or Condomium. It is where the river Gèle flows into the river Baïse.

Although the French word for a condom is préservatif, in 1995 the town's mayor, taking advantage of the incidental relationship between the town's name and the English word, opened a museum of contraceptives. It operated until 2005.

== Politics and administration ==
=== Mayors ===
Mayor	Term start	Term end
Jean Dubos	1983	1983
Jacques Moisan	1989	1995
Gérard Dubrac	1995	2008
Bernard Gallardo	2008	2014
Gérard Dubrac	2014	2020
Jean-François Rousse	2020	

=== Twin towns ===
- Grünberg, Germany – since 1973
- Toro, Spain

== Population ==
Historical population

Year	Pop.	±% p.a.
1793	11,064	—
1800	6,650	−7.01%
1806	7,051	+0.98%
1821	7,146	+0.09%
1831	7,144	−0.00%
1841	6,915	−0.33%
1846	7,195	+0.80%
1851	7,205	+0.03%
1856	7,553	+0.95%
1861	8,070	+1.33%
1866	8,140	+0.17%
1872	8,282	+0.29%
1876	7,873	−1.26%
1881	8,555	+1.68%
1886	7,902	−1.58%
1891	7,405	−1.29%
1896	7,045	−0.99%
1901	6,578	−1.36%

Year	Pop.	±% p.a.
1906	6,435	−0.44%
1911	6,380	−0.17%
1921	5,773	−0.99%
1926	6,355	+1.94%
1931	6,310	−0.14%
1936	6,233	−0.25%
1946	6,725	+0.76%
1954	6,781	+0.10%
1962	6,850	+0.13%
1968	7,326	+1.13%
1975	7,853	+1.00%
1982	7,634	−0.40%
1990	7,717	+0.14%
1999	7,251	−0.69%
2007	7,147	−0.18%
2012	6,927	−0.62%
2017	6,530	−1.17%
2023	6,473	−0.15%

Source: EHESS and INSEE (1968-2023)

== Tourism ==
Condom is the site of two castles, the Château de Mothes and the Château de Pouypardin, both started in the 13th century. In total, 19 sites in Condom are listed as monuments historiques by the French Ministry of Culture, including the cathedral, churches and houses.

Condom is known for the production of Armagnac, an international music festival of "bandas", an international chess tournament and an international chess marathon. It is also known for its tourism with farm campings and boating on waterways. It is also home to a museum about Armagnac.

A statue of The Three Musketeers and d'Artagnan stands beside the cathedral and was created in 2010 by Zurab Tsereteli.

== Notable people ==
- Blaise de Montluc, marshal of France, buried in Condom
- Scipion Dupleix (1569–1661)
- Jacques-Bénigne Bossuet (1627–1704)
- Jean-Charles Persil (1785–1870)
- Narcisse-Achille de Salvandy (1795–1856)
- Sarah Maldoror (1929–2020)
- Samuel Marques, (1988–) Portuguese rugby union player, born in Condom
- Stéphane Abrial (1954–), French general born in Condom
- Siouxsie Sioux (1957–), English singer and songwriter, moved to Condom in 1992 and left in 2015.
- Budgie (1957-), English drummer and songwriter, arrived in Condom in 1992 and left in 2006
- Grégory Alldritt (1997–), French Rugby Union player
- Jean-Louis Palladin (1946–2001), French/American Chef
- Larry L'Estrange (1934–2007), British soldier and rugby player, retired in Condom

== See also ==
- Bishop of Condom
- Place names considered unusual
- Communes of the Gers department
