= Monluc =

Monluc, or Montluc, the name of a French family. It stemmed from the house of Lasseran-Mansencomme, which possessed the estate of Monluc in Agenais, and whose last heiress, Gersende, married a cadet from the House of Montesquiou. All its male members died at war in the lapse of a single decade and the name disappeared in the early 17th century.

== Lineage ==
- Blaise de Montesquiou de Lasseran-Massencôme, seigneur de Montluc (d. 1577), Marshal, author of the Commentaires
  - Pierre Bertrand, called the Capitaine Peyrot, who perished in an expedition to Madeira in 1566,
  - Fabien de Monluc
    - Adrien de Monluc-Montesquiou, prince de Chabanais
      - Jeanne de Monluc (died 1657), countess of Carmaing, princess of Chabanais, brought the estates of her house to the family of Escoubleau by her marriage with Charles d'Escoubleau, marquess of Sourdis and Alluyes.
- Jean de Monluc (?-1579), the marshal's brother, bishop and ambassador
  - Jean de Monluc de Balagny (d. 1603), seigneur de Balagny, the bishop's natural son, Marshal.
