= Vergt =

- Commune
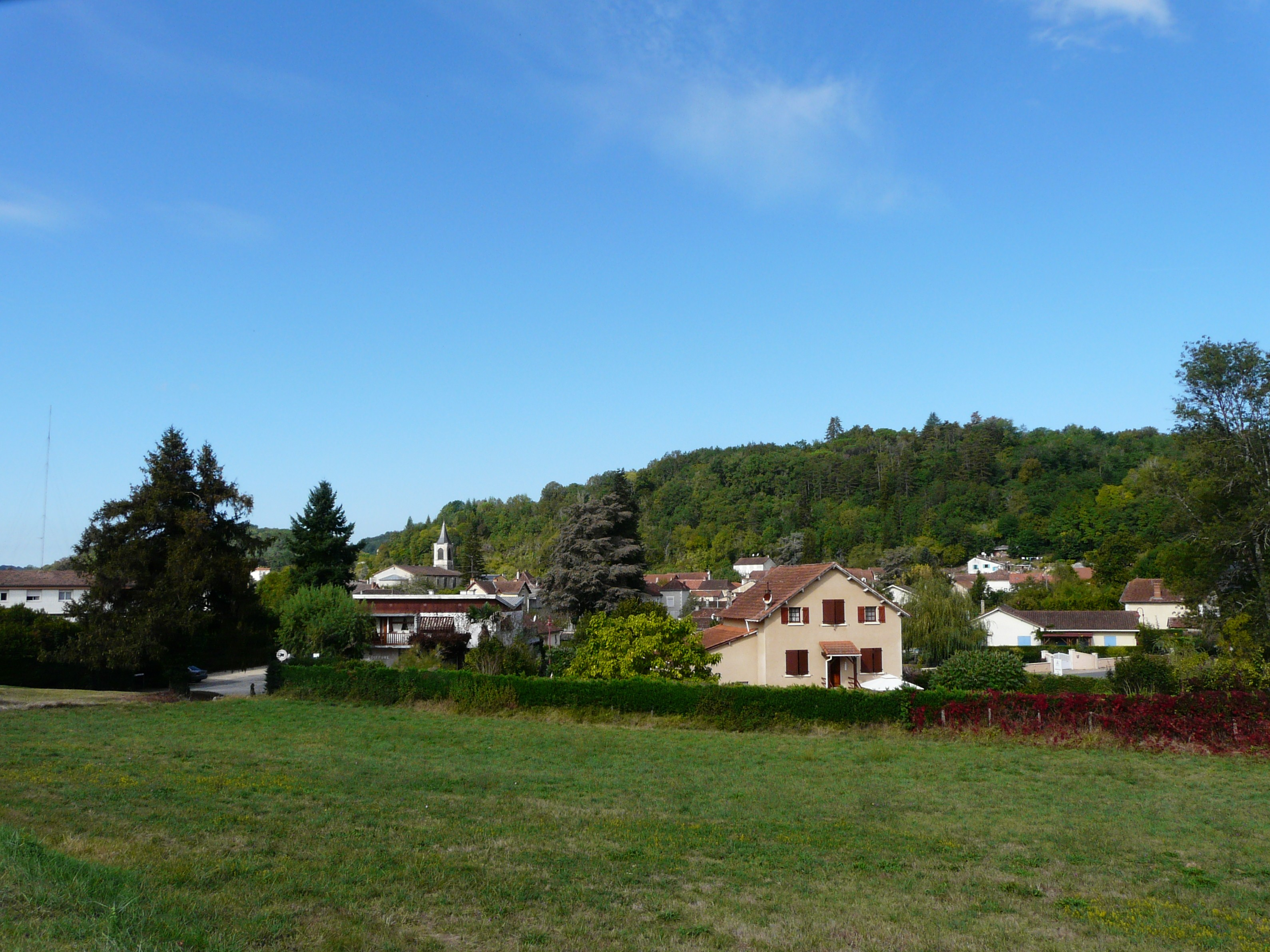
- A general view of Vergt

- Coat of arms
- Location of Vergt
- Location within France Location within Nouvelle-Aquitaine
- Coordinates: 45°01′41″N 0°43′09″E
- Country: France
- Region: Nouvelle-Aquitaine
- Department: Dordogne
- Arrondissement: Périgueux
- Canton: Périgord Central
- Intercommunality: Le Grand Périgueux

Government
  - Mayor (2020–2026): Pierre Jaubertie
- Area^{1}: 32.52 km^{2} (12.56 sq mi)
- Elevation: 126 m (413 ft)
- Highest elevation: 246 m (807 ft)
- Lowest elevation: 112 m (367 ft)
- Population (2023): 1,773
  - Density: 54.52/km^{2} (141.2/sq mi)
- Time zone: UTC+01:00 (CET)
  - Summer (DST): UTC+02:00 (CEST)
- INSEE/Postal code: 24571 /24380
- ^{1} French Land Register data, which excludes lakes, ponds, glaciers > 1 km^{2} (0.386 sq mi or 247 acres) and river estuaries.

Vergt (French pronunciation: [vɛʁ]; Occitan: Vern) is a commune in the Dordogne department in Nouvelle-Aquitaine in southwestern France.

== History ==
On 9 October 1562, Vergt was the site of one of the first major battles of the French Wars of Religion. An army of Huguenot rebels under Symphorien de Duras was defeated by a Royalist force led by Blaise de Montluc, a victory which prevented them linking up with Protestant forces north of the Loire.

== Population ==
Historical population
Year	Pop.	±% p.a.
1968	1,224	—
1975	1,369	+1.61%
1982	1,419	+0.51%
1990	1,422	+0.03%
1999	1,512	+0.68%
2007	1,725	+1.66%
2012	1,624	−1.20%
2017	1,672	+0.58%
2023	1,773	+0.98%
Source: INSEE

== See also ==
- Communes of the Dordogne department

== Sources ==
- Thompson, James (1909). The Wars of Religion in France 1559–1576: The Huguenots, Catherine de Medici and Phillip II. Chicago University Press.
