= Charles de Coucis =

Military commander and lieutenant-general of Guyenne

- seigneur de Burie
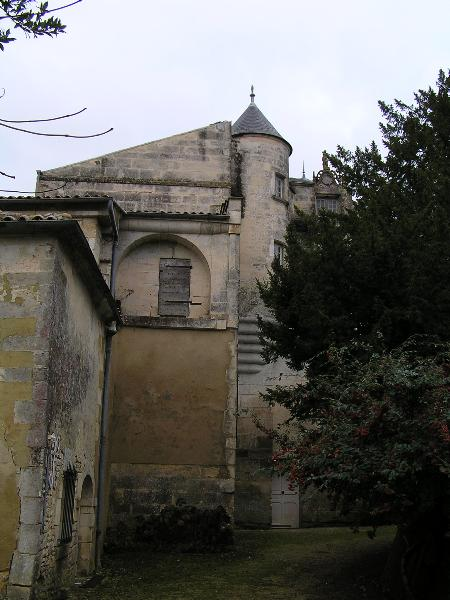
- The château de Burie
- Born: 1492; Kingdom of France
- Died: 1565 (aged 72-3)

Charles de Coucis seigneur de Burie (1492-1565) was a Catholic military commander and lieutenant-general of Guyenne. Burie assisted the crown in its efforts to extinguish the embers of the Conspiracy of Amboise in 1560, investigating the situation in Poitiers for the court. This accomplished he returned to his lieutenant-generalship where he spent the next year attempting to suppress the Huguenots of the region. A moderate figure, he looked to find compromise as far as toleration of Protestantism was concerned, conceding the right of Protestants to hold their services in private, and seeking to provide them the right to bury their dead in their own cemetery.

In early 1562, the crown sent commissioners into the south, to investigate the disorders, and ensure the implementation of the Edict of January. These commissioners proved too partisan, for both Burie and Monluc, who had been assigned to the region to aid in the restoring of order, however before much could be accomplished with their replacements, civil war broke out. In his office of lieutenant-general, Burie had an important role to play in the control of Guyenne for the crown, and he devoted his efforts to quieting any potential disorder in Bordeaux. He was a cautious commander, and was unwilling to act when Monluc urged him to send his forces to catch the Protestant army of the region. Eventually persuaded by his subordinates, Burie provided troops for the Battle of Vergt where in combination with troops under Monluc, the Protestant army of Guyenne was crushed, a heavy blow to the Protestant cause in the first of the French Wars of Religion. In the peace that followed Burie continued to engage with the commissioners sent to the region, before dying in 1565.

== Reign of Francis II ==
In the immediate wake of the Conspiracy of Amboise, military figures were sent out from the centre to various localities to ensure obedience was maintained. Paul de Thermes was sent to Blois, Vielleville to Orléans and Burie was sent to Poitiers to assess the situation in the city. In late 1560, Burie went into Guyenne, and began his efforts to combat the disorder there.

== Reign of Charles IX ==
With the situation in much of the north under control, attention turned to the south of France, where much of Guyenne was subject to the uprisings that accompanied the conspiracy. To suppress the Calvinist presence in the area, Blaise de Monluc was tasked with stamping out the disorder. To assist him in his task, Burie, the lieutenant-general of Guyenne was assigned as his deputy.

=== Subduing Guyenne ===
Burie oversaw the establishment of an arrêt from the Parlement of Bordeaux in which Protestant services were prohibited, however he secretly informed the Protestants that he would not investigate their services if they held them in private. In late 1561 after a mob sacked the town, Burie was besieged by Protestants in his house. After the murder of the baron de Fumel by his tenants in November 1561, Burie travelled to the region from Bordeaux and the assembled nobles of the region swore a pact under his leadership to devote their lives to aiding him against the peasants who had killed Fumel. After several weeks the peasants had been crushed and the pact was dissolved.

=== Commissioners ===
To provide legal aid to their military mission, the commissioners Nicolas de Compaing and Guillaume Girard were to be sent to the region. Burie wrote delightedly to the court that Compaing, noting that he was held in high regard and would be 'more invaluable than 100 arquebusiers.' The arrival of these two commissioners would however be delayed and to hold the region over, two members of the Bordeaux Parlement assigned to support them, Alesme and Ferron. In March, none of the four potential commissioners had arrived and Monluc and Burie announced their intention to proceed with their commission regardless. When at last Compaing and Girard did arrive, Burie and Monluc were disappointed, finding them highly partisan in favour of the Protestants. Alesme and Ferron meanwhile, lacked the governmental powers that the commissioners had been given. Burie and Monluc thus wrote to the crown asking for Alesme and Ferron to be granted the same broad remits that had been given to the commissioners. Burie supported the Protestants of Bordeaux when they complained that the local city authorities had obstructed their efforts to find a burial place for their dead. He argued that 'humanity would be extinguished' if a settlement was not found for the issue.

=== First civil war ===
Their task to bring Guyenne under control was complicated by the eruption of civil war in April 1562. In June, Burie was struggling to hold on to the key town of Bordeaux and sent urgent requests for Monluc to come and provide support. En route to assist his deputy, Monluc encountered an envoy from Jeanne d'Albret who assured him she and Burie had the situation under control. Albret was aware of a rivalry between Burie and Monluc and hoped to use it to the advantage of her co-religionists in the region. In October, Monluc had ambitions to catch the main Protestant force in the region, under the command of Symphorien de Duras, to this end he informed Burie of his intentions and hastily made for Duras' position. Burie was cautious, and didn't desire to bring his forces to support Monluc without authorisation from Montpensier. Monluc managed to persuade Burie's subordinates to join him and Burie decided to go along with the plan, bringing several artillery pieces to the field of Vergt where the unsuspecting Protestant army lay. Their combined army would destroy the Protestant force, denying Condé valuable men for his northern army and temporarily bringing Guyenne to heel.

=== Peace ===
With the Edict of Amboise ending the first war of religion, a far more thorough system of commissioners were now sent out into the provinces to enforce its terms and arbitrate disputes. Masparrault and Bourgneuf, commissioners for Saintonge were hoping to investigate the murder of a gentleman in Saint-Jean-d'Angély however Burie refused to offer them the assistance or protection required, so they left the town. At the age of 73 Burie would pass away in 1565.

== Sources ==
- Forneron, H (1876). "Note sur la bataille de Vergt 15 Octobre 1562". Bulletin de la Société Historique et Archéologique du Périgord. 3.
- Harding, Robert (1978). Anatomy of a Power Elite: the Provincial Governors in Early Modern France. Yale University Press.
- Roberts, Penny (2013). Peace and Authority during the French Religious Wars c.1560-1600. Palgrave Macmillan.
- Roelker, Nancy (1968). Queen of Navarre: Jeanne d'Albret 1528-1572. Harvard University Press.
- Thompson, James (1909). The Wars of Religion in France 1559-1576: The Huguenots, Catherine de Medici and Philip II. Chicago University Press.
