= Roman Catholic Diocese of Condom =

French diocese

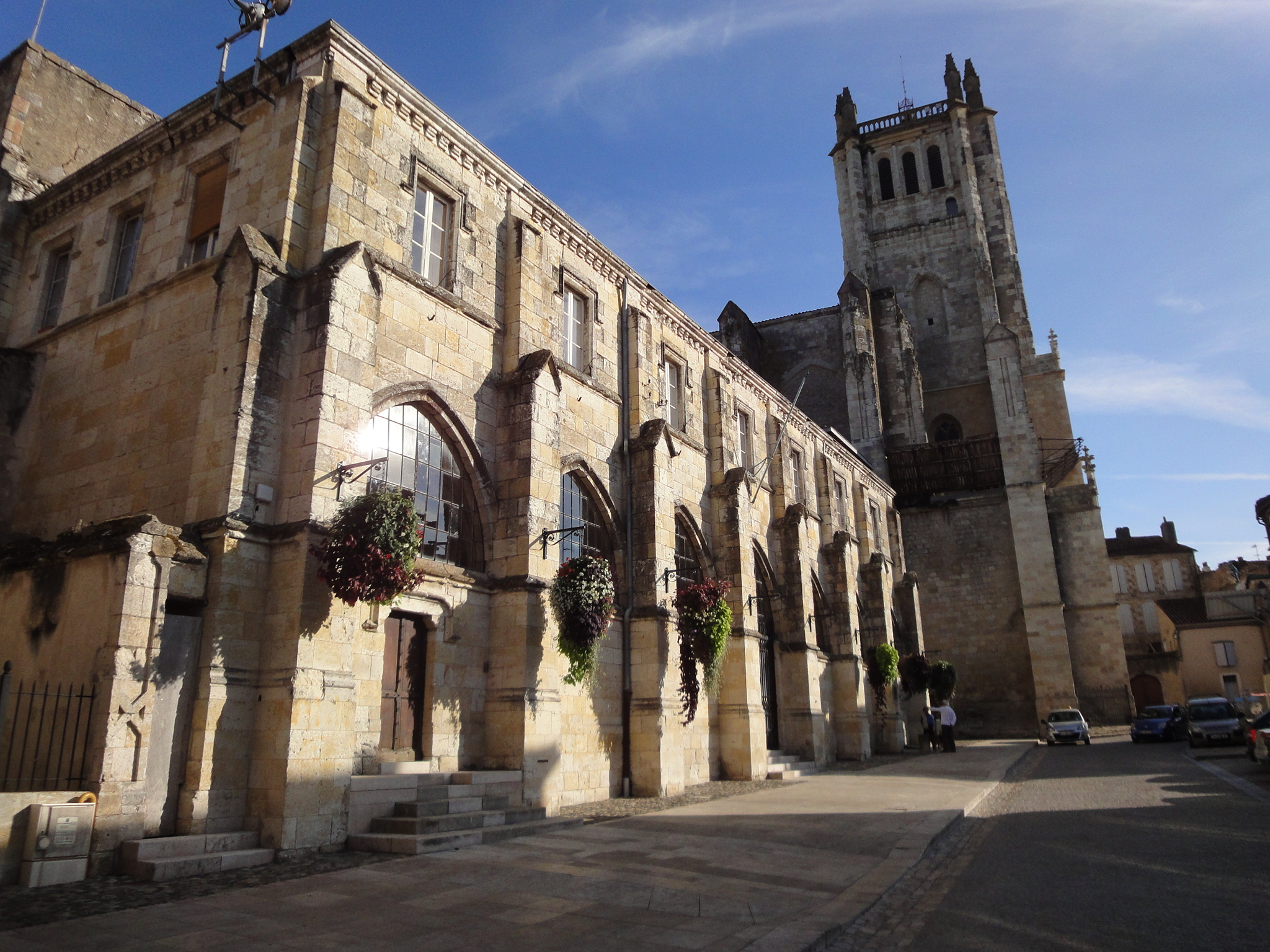
Condom Cathedral

The Roman Catholic Diocese of Condom was a French bishopric based in Condom from 1317 to 1801.

It comprised four archdeaconries: Condom itself, Bruilhois, Villefranche and Nérac. In 1763 these totaled circa 140 parishes.

== Abbey of Condom ==
The diocese grew out of a much older abbey at Condom whose origin remains obscure. After the original monastery's destruction during the ninth century Norman raids or, more likely, the Saracen mid tenth century raids, on its ruins a Benedictine cenobium with a church devoted to Saint Peter was built in 1041, which over time enjoyed many donations and received privileges, confirmed by popes. One of its monks wrote the Historia abbatiae Condomensis on its history, but it is held to be unreliable.

== History ==
- The Diocese of Condom was established as such on 17 July 1317 by transforming the abbey into a bishopric: its elevation was confirmed on 13 August 1317 by Pope John XXII in the papal bull Salvator noster, assigning to it a territory from its mother Diocese of Agen south of the Garonne. The abbey church became its cathedral, the last abbot Raymond de Galard was promoted to be its first bishop, suffragan of the Archdiocese of Bordeaux.
- After great devastations and moral decay throughout the bishopric during the Hundred Years' War, bishop Jean Marre rebuilt the cathedral and many churches and published an Enchiridion, a Christian doctrinal manual for the diocesan clergy. The religious wars against the Huguenots brought more bloodshed and devastation, but the wreck of the cathedral was bought off.
- Its most famous incumbent, Bossuet, championed moral revival and reasserted clerical discipline, calling a diocesan synod in 1761, grouped the parishes into 'conferences' within the four archdeaconries and resigned, unable to respect the duty of residence he has imposed on his clergy, due to his many obligations elsewhere
- During the French Revolution, the diocese was dissolved in favor of a constitutional bishop for a short-lived schismatic Diocese of Gers
- Under the Napoleonic Concordat of 1801 it was formally restored, but only to be merged into its once mother see, the Diocese of Agen, on 29 November 1801
- On 29 June 1908 Condom's title was united with the Archdiocese of Auch, which from its 182 restoration had already acquired most of Condom's former territory

== Episcopal Ordinaries ==
Suffragan Bishops of Condom

- Raymond de Galard (1317.08.13 – death 1340.03.23)
- Pierre de Galard (1340.10.25 – 1369)
- Bernard Alaman (1369.12.03 – death 1401.03.09)
- Hugues Raimbaud (1401 – death 1405.10.11)
- (1405–1408 : name not known)
- Aymeric Noël (1408.03.10 – 1418), next Bishop of Castres (France) (1418 – death 1421.10)
- Pierre Assalbit, Augustinians (O.E.S.A.) (1419.08.23 – 1421.01.08), next Bishop of Alet (1421.01.08 – death 1441)
- Jean Coursier (1421.01.08 – death 1454)
- Guillaume d'Étampes (1454 – 1458), previously Bishop of Montauban (France) (1452.01.03 – 1454)
- Guy de Montbrun (1461 – 1486)
- Antoine de Pompadour (1486.05.15 – 1496.10.11)
- Jean Bilhères de Lagraulas, Benedictine Congregation of Cluny (O.S.B. Clun.) (1496.10.26 – 1499.08.06), previously Bishop of Lombez (France) (1473.07.05 – 1499.08.04), created Cardinal-Priest of S. Sabina (1493.09.23 – 1499.08.06); also Bishop of Viviers (France) (1498.02.14 – 1499.08.06)
  - Apostolic Administrator Father Amanieu d’Albret (1499.09.13 – 1500?), while Apostolic Administrator of Diocese of Saint-Bertrand-de-Comminges (France) (1499.07.19 – 1514); later created Cardinal-Deacon of S. Nicola in Carcere (1500.10.05 – 1520.12.20), Apostolic Administrator of Diocese of Pamiers (France) (1502.03.14 – 1506), Apostolic Administrator of Diocese of Vannes (Brittany, France) (1504.01.08 – 1504.10.14), Apostolic Administrator of Diocese of Bazas (France) (1504.12.04 – 1520.12.20), Apostolic Administrator of Diocese of Lescar (France) (1507.10.06 – 1515.06.20), Apostolic Administrator of Diocese of Pamplona (Spain) (1510.05.13 – 1512), Apostolic Administrator of Pamiers (again) (1514.05.15 – 1514.08.18), Apostolic Administrator of Diocese of Couserans (France) (1515.06.20 – 1515.06.25), Apostolic Administrator of Pamiers (again) (1515.06.23 – 1520.12.20), Apostolic Administrator of Pamplona (again) (1517 – 1520.12.20), Protodeacon of Sacred College of Cardinals (1520.09.03 – death 1520.12.20)
- Jean Marre (1500? – death 1521.10.13)
- Hérard de Grossoles-Flamarens (1521.10.19 – death 1544)
- Charles de Pisseleu (1545.06.15 – death 1564), previously Bishop of Mende (France) (1538.10.13 – 1545.06.15)
- Robert de Gontaut-Biron (1565 – death 1569.08.25)
- Jean de Monluc (1570 – 1581) (Note: Third son of Blaise de Monluc and nephew of Jean de Monluc, Bishop of Valence)
- Jean du Chemin (1581 – death 1616), succeeding as former Coadjutor Bishop of Condom (? – 1581)
- Antoine de Coues (1616 – death 1647), succeeding as previous Titular Bishop of Auzia (1604.03.15 – 1616) and Coadjutor Bishop of Condom (1604.03.15 – 1616)
- Jean d'Estrades (1648.02.14 – 1658)), previously Bishop of Périgueux (France) (1646.07 – 1648.02.14)
- Charles-Louis de Lorraine (1659.11.10 – death 1668.06.01)

BIOS TO ELABORATE

- 1669–1671 : Jacques-Bénigne Bossuet
- 1671–1693 : Jacques de Goyon de Matignon
- 1693 : Mathieu-Isaure d'Hervaut
- 1693–1734 : Louis Milon
- 1735–1758 : Emmanuel de Cossé-Brissac
- 1758–1760 : Louis de Montmorency-Laval
- 1760–1763 : Étienne-Charles de Loménie de Brienne
- Alexandre-César d'Anterroches (1763.06.05 – death 1793.01.28), exiled to London from 15 September 1792 during the French Revolution

== See also ==
- List of Catholic dioceses in France

== Sources and external links ==
- GCatholic - former bishopric
- GCatholic, with satellite map - former cathedral of St. Pierre (Peter)
- Profile at catholic-hierarchy.org
- Map of the bishopric on Gallica.bnf.fr

Bibliography

- Denis de Sainte-Marthe, Gallia christiana, vol. II, Paris 1720, coll. 953–974
- C. Bourgeat, lemma 'Condom', in Dictionnaire d'Histoire et de Géographie ecclésiastiques, vol. XIII, Paris 1956, coll. 424–438
- Pius Bonifacius Gams, Series episcoporum Ecclesiae Catholicae, Leipzig 1931, p. 540
- Konrad Eubel, Hierarchia Catholica Medii Aevi, vol. 1, pp. 201–202; vol. 2, p. 133; vol. 3, p. 175; vol. 4, p. 159; vol. 5, p. 168; vol. 6, p. 178
- Papal bulla Salvator noster, in Bullarum diplomatum et privilegiorum sanctorum Romanorum pontificum Taurinensis editio, Vol. IV, p. 249
- Bulla Qui Christi Domini, in Bullarii romani continuatio, vol. XI, Rome 1845, pp. 245–249
- Decree Romanos Pontifices, ASS 41 (1908), p. 668
