= Battle of Vergt =

1562 conflict in French Wars of Religion

- Part of First French War of Religion (1562–1563)
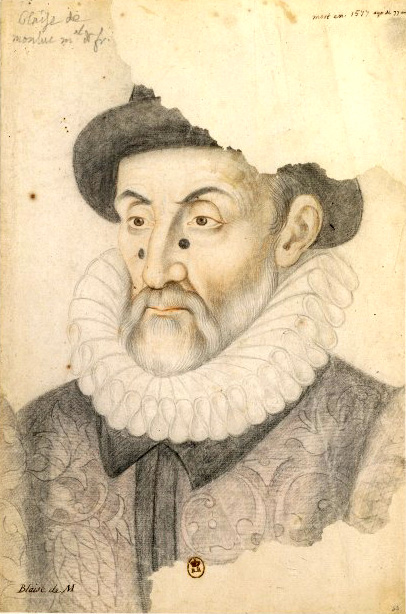
- Blaise de Monluc, painted in the 1570s; badly injured in 1570, the dots indicate missing parts of his face
| Date | 9 October 1562 (Note: Some historians argue the battle took place on 15 October) |
| Location | Vergt, France |
| Result | Royalist victory |

Belligerents
| France; Spain | Huguenots |

Commanders and leaders
| Blaise de Montluc; Charles de Coucis | Symphorien de Duras; De Bordet; Pardaillon |

Strength
| 5,000 French; 5,000 Spanish | 10,000–12,000 |

Casualties and losses
| Minimal | 1,800 to 2,000 |

The Battle of Vergt took place on 9 October 1562 during the first French War of Religion, between a Royalist army led by Blaise de Montluc and Huguenot rebels under Symphorien de Duras. The battle was a decisive Royalist victory, which destroyed Duras' army, and prevented him reinforcing Protestant forces in the Loire Valley led by Gaspard II de Coligny and Condé. As such, it is considered a turning point in the first French War of Religion.

When the war began in April 1562, Protestant rebels controlled much of Guyenne and Gascony, while Condé and Coligny quickly seized much of central France north of the Loire. Duras recruited around 10,000 reinforcements, but then wasted several months seeking to capture Bordeaux. On 9 October, he was surprised by Montluc near the village of Vergt and ordered a withdrawal to the safety of some nearby hills, unwilling to risk a pitched battle. Slowed by their artillery train, the Protestant rearguard was caught in the open by the superior Royalist cavalry, which broke through their formation. Duras escaped with the cavalry but lost most of his infantry.

== Background ==
Nouvelle-Aquitaine; key locations 1562 campaign

While the French Wars of Religion did not formally begin until April 1562, by late 1561 much of southwestern France was already in a state of civil war. In January 1562, Blaise de Montluc and Burie were appointed by Charles IX of France to restore Royal authority in Guyenne. Shortly after taking office, Montluc reported that "all of Guyenne, save Toulouse and Bordeaux" was held by the Huguenot rebels.

On 2 April, the Protestant leader Condé seized Orléans and rapidly over-ran large parts of central France and Normandy, but he was short of infantry who were traditionally recruited from Gascony and Guyenne. To fill this need, Symphorien de Duras, the local Protestant leader based in Bergerac, raised between 8,000 and 10,000 troops. Short of money and men, the Royalist commander in southern France, Louis, Duke of Montpensier, was unable to intervene.

Burie, who commanded the Royalist garrison of Bordeaux, was an elderly moderate suspected of Huguenot sympathies with little enthusiasm for the war. In contrast, Monluc proved an energetic defender of Royal authority, who by his own admission executed hundreds of Protestant prisoners and expressed regret that a lack of funds forced him to ransom captured officers, rather than kill them. (Note: “Had the King paid his companies I should not have suffered ransom to have been in use in this quarrel. It is not...as in a foreign war where men fight for love and honour. In a civil war we must either be master or man, being we live as it were, all under a roof.”)

Royalist strategy in the south sought to prevent Duras joining up with the Protestant army in Orléans under Condé. In mid July, Philip II of Spain sent Burie 5,000 Spanish troops, though his inability to pay their wages made them mutinous and unreliable. Over the next few months, Montluc captured Bergerac, Agen and Lectoure, while Duras focused on trying to take Bordeaux, despite Jeanne d'Albret urging him to march north and reinforce Condé.

By early October, Montauban was the only major town in Guyenne still in Protestant hands. Duras decided to combine his forces with those led by François III de La Rochefoucauld, who was currently besieging Saint-Jean-d'Angély, then together join Condé. With Montpensier in Bergerac and Burie in Bordeaux, Duras believed Monluc was still besieging Lectoure, not realising it had already fallen, and he wasted more time sacking Carlux. Hoping to intercept the Protestant army, Monluc advised Burie of his intentions and hastily left Lectoure; he reached Siorac on 7 October, where a letter from Burie informed him he was unwilling to act without orders from Montpensier.

Montluc managed to convince Burie's senior officers to follow with their men and early next day crossed the Vézère with the few troops he had available. Here he learned Duras' artillery and infantry were at Vergt, with his cavalry stationed in the nearby village of Cendrieux; having failed to send out patrols, they were unaware of how close the enemy was and the Royalists captured 25 of their officers who were out hunting. In the evening Montluc was joined by Burie and his men, who brought with them four pieces of artillery. Duras ordered his cavalry to withdraw from Cendrieux but assumed his officers had been captured by local Catholic partisans and only discovered the truth when the Royalists arrived outside Vergt early on the morning of 9 October.

== Battle ==
There are few contemporary accounts of the battle, the most comprehensive being the version provided by Montluc in his "Commentaires". Written around 1576 and heavily edited in light of subsequent events, historians consider many of the details exaggerated or altered to favour a particular perspective. However, the broad outline is confirmed by reports from his senior officers as well as diplomatic dispatches sent to Philip II and other European rulers, among them Elizabeth I of England.

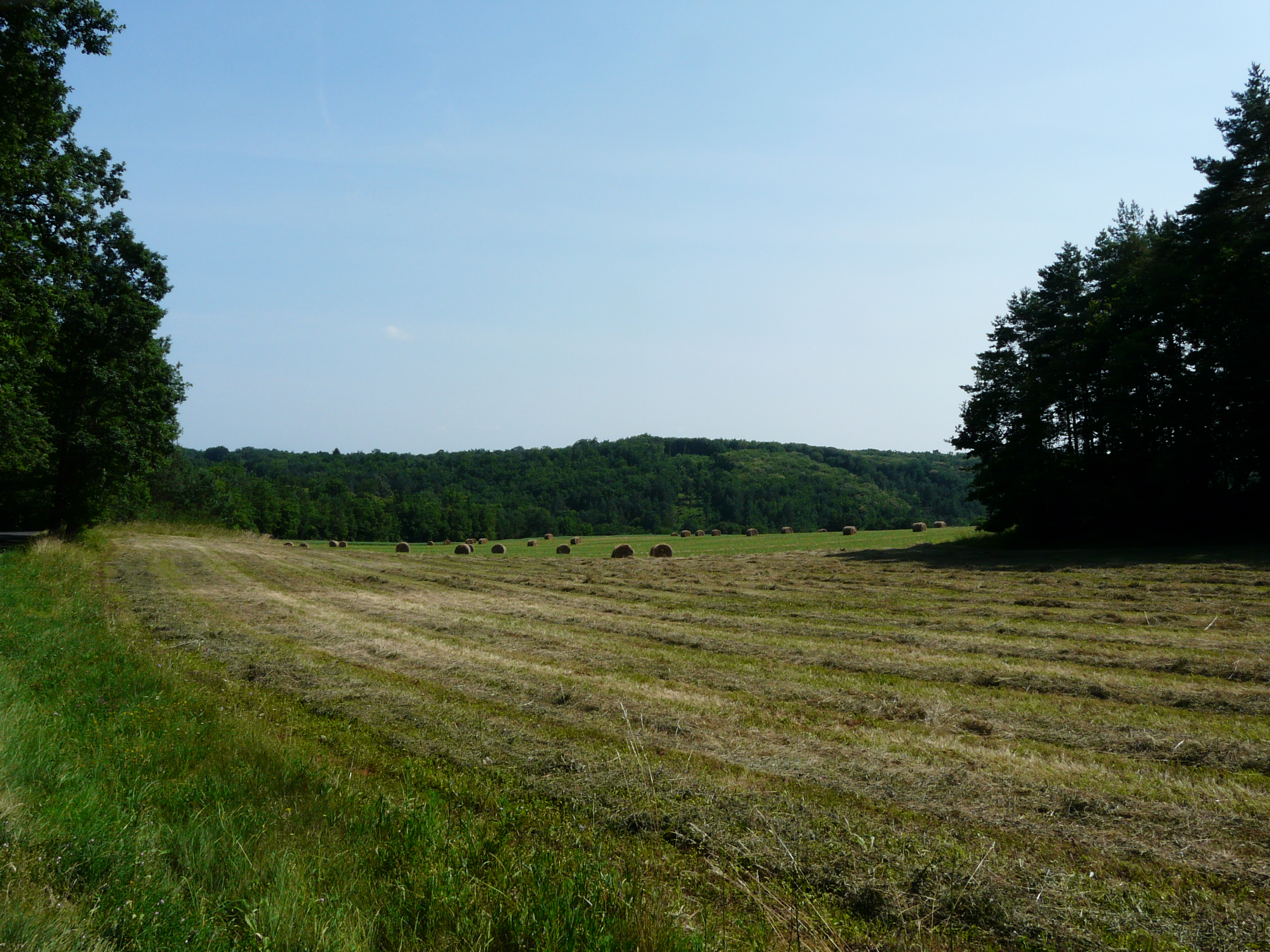
View of the area around Vergt, showing the meadows that favoured the Catholic cavalry

By abandoning Cendrieux, Duras gave up a strong defensive position, while the meadows and flat ground around Vergt favoured the superior Catholic cavalry. Still unclear as to the number or location of the enemy, Duras resumed his march north. Several squadrons of Royalist cavalry accidentally ran into the Huguenot rearguard under Bordet and were repulsed, but the skirmish meant Duras halted to assess the situation. Seeing this, Montluc ordered his artillery to open fire on the Protestant infantry, while the delay allowed him to bring his troops into battle formation. Although the bombardment did little damage, Duras held a council of war to decide the best course of action. Of his senior officers, Pardaillon urged an immediate attack, but Bordet advised him to withdraw and ensure the infantry remained intact for Condé.

After some discussion, Duras agreed with Bordet, but was forced to wait while the artillery prepared to move. The Huguenot army headed for some nearby hills, which would provide protection from the Catholic horse, Pardaillon leading the vanguard, the artillery in the centre under Sainte-Hermine and Duras commanding the rearguard. Seeing his opponents escaping, Montluc ordered the infantry to follow as fast as possible and urged his cavalry forward, gradually closing the gap until they were only 200 metres away. Seeing he could no longer reach safety without abandoning his guns, Duras ordered the rearguard to stand but the Royalists broke through their position. Retreat became a rout and the Huguenot army dissolved in panic, scattering into the nearby woods.

== Aftermath ==
Contemporaries and later commentators criticised Duras for failing to spot Montluc until he arrived outside Vergt and for jeopardising the entire army to save his guns. While helped by these mistakes, Montluc's boldness and aggression were key to victory and he received great credit from Montpensier. Royalist losses were minimal, Huguenot casualties between 1,800 and 2,000 dead, many of whom were camp followers allegedly killed by Spanish troops in the pursuit. Another 500 to 1,000 stragglers or suspected Huguenot sympathisers were summarily executed by Monluc, who later reported "You can see the route I took because the victims are found on the trees and along the roadside".

Duras escaped with most of the cavalry and reached Montmorillon with between 800 and 900 men, (Note: Montluc later claimed only "200 to 300" escaped but this is not supported by other Sources.) where he linked up with Rochefoucauld. Despite further losses from desertion, they reached Orléans on 4 November with around 2,000 men, although many were poorly trained and equipped. However, the troops lost at Vergt left Condé and Coligny short of infantry and contributed to their defeat at Dreux in December. Duras died at the Siege of Orleans in early 1563.

Despite their victory, the Royalist hold on Guyenne remained precarious and Montluc spent the next few months negotiating with his superiors for more resources. Lacking heavy weapons or military cohesion, the defeated Huguenot army broke into small bands that began raiding Catholic towns throughout the Dordogne in an increasingly vicious guerrilla war. Led by Armand de Clermont, Baron de Piles, they retook Sainte-Foy-la-Grande in December 1562, Mussidan in January 1563 and Bergerac in March, by which time they also controlled most of the countryside around Bordeaux. This was the situation when the two sides made peace in the Edict of Amboise, signed on 19 March.

== Sources ==
- Bryson, David (1999). Queen Jeanne and the Promised Land: Dynasty, Homeland, Religion and Violence in Sixteenth-Century France. Brill. ISBN 978-9004113787.
- Courteault, Paul (1908). Blaise de Montluc; Historien (in French). Bibliothèque Méridionale.
- Forneron, H (1876). "Note sur la bataille de Vergt 15 Octobre 1562". Bulletin de la Société historique et archéologique du Périgord. 3.
- Haag, Eugène; Haag, Emilie (1852). La France Protestante, Volume III (in French). Joel Cherbuliez.
- Gould, Kevin Dr (2005). "The Commentaires de Blaise de Montluc in the Historiography of the French Wars of Religion" (PDF). Renaissance Journal. 2 (4).
- Holt, Mack (2005). The French Wars of Religion, 1562-1629. Cambridge University Press. ISBN 9780521547505.
- Knecht, Robert (1995). "The sword and the pen: Blaise de Monluc and his "Commentaires"". Renaissance Studies. 9 (1): 104–118. doi:10.1111/j.1477-4658.1995.tb00303.x. JSTOR 24412373.
- Montluc, Blaise de (1964). Courteault, Paul (ed.). Commentaires de Blaise de Montluc (in French). Bibliothèque de la Pléiade.
- Potter, David (1997). The French Wars of Religion: Selected Documents. Macmillan. ISBN 0312175450.
- Roelker, Nancy (1968). Queen of Navarre: Jeanne d'Albret 1528-1572. Harvard University Press.
- Roberts, Penny (2013). Peace and Authority during the French Religious Wars c. 1560-1600. Palgrave Macmillan. ISBN 9781137326744.
- Salmon, J.H.M (1979). Society in Crisis: France in the Sixteenth Century. University Paperback. ISBN 0416730507.
- Thompson, James (1909). The Wars of Religion in France 1559–1576: The Huguenots, Catherine de Medici and Phillip II. Chicago University Press.
