= Jean de Monluc =

French clergyman and diplomat

His Grace Jean de Montluc
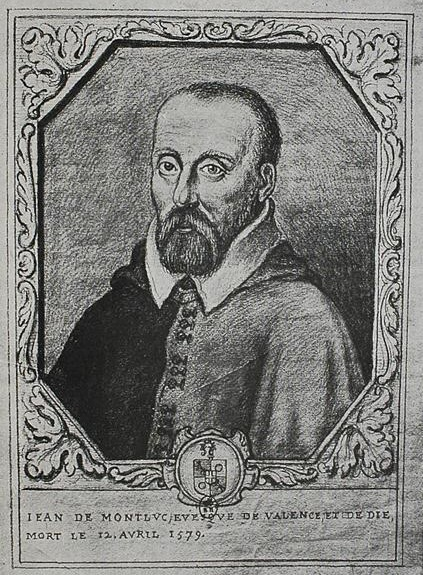
- Jean de Montluc, late 16th century engraving

Ambassador to Poland
- In office 1573–1574
- Monarch: Henry III of France
- Succeeded by: Jean Choisnin

Envoy to Scotland
- In office March 1560 – June 1560
- Monarch: Francis II of France

French Embassy in Rome
- In office 1524–1540

Personal details
- Born: c. 1508 Saint-Puy France
- Died: 15 April 1579 (aged 70) Toulouse
- Resting place: Toulouse Cathedral
- Profession: Clergyman and diplomat
- Bishop
- Metropolis: Lyon
- See: Valence et Die
- Appointed: 1553
- Installed: 1554
- Term ended: 1574
- Predecessor: Jacques de Tornon
- Successor: Charles de Gélas de Léberon

Jean de Monluc, c. 1508 to 12 April 1579, was a French nobleman, clergyman, diplomat and courtier. He was the second son of François de Lasseran de Massencome, a member of the Monluc family; and Françoise d' Estillac. His birthplace is unknown, but it has been observed that his parents spent a great deal of time at their favorite residence at Saint-Gemme in the commune of Saint-Puy near Condom. His elder brother Blaise de Montluc became a soldier and eventually Marshal of France (1574).

== Early career ==
Montluc began his religious career as a young Dominican novice, in either their Convent in Condom or the one in Agen. From the beginning he showed outstanding talent as a public speaker. He was introduced to Queen Marguerite de Navarre, the sister of King Francis I of France, who often stayed in her chateau at Nérac, just north of Condom, and quickly became part of her entourage, abandoning his life as a Dominican friar.

== French diplomat ==
In 1524 Jean de Monluc served as an attaché to the French Embassy in Rome. In 1536, now a Protonotary Apostolic, he was again assigned to the Embassy being sent to Rome headed by Bishop Charles Hémard of Mâcon. In 1537 Monluc was sent with a personal viva voce message from King Francis I to Pasha Khizir Khayr ad-Dîn (Barberousse), the Captain General of the Ottoman fleet, who was beginning a campaign against the coasts of Italy. In July 1537, the Pasha landed at Otranto and captured the city, as well as the Fortress of Castro and the city of Ugento in Apulia. Monluc set off on 6 August, and a meeting took place with the Pasha on 1 September. On his return journey Monluc was received by Pope Paul III in a public audience, where embarrassing questions were raised about the rumored poisoning of the Dauphin. Details of his embassy were submitted in a letter to Cardinal du Bellay in Paris. He remained in Rome, attached to the French Embassy, under the Comte de Grignan and then Bishop Jean de Langeac of Limoges, at least until 1540.

In ca. 1542 Monluc was sent on a mission to Venice. His assignment was to explain to the Venetians why it had been a good idea for Francis I to ally himself with the Ottoman Turks. It was a thankless task, and a hopeless mission, but one which used Monluc's great gifts of oratory in the service of the King.

Monluc distinguished himself in several embassies. In 1545, Jean de Monluc went on an embassy for Francis I of France to the Ottoman Empire in Constantinople, where he joined ambassador Gabriel de Luetz d'Aramon.

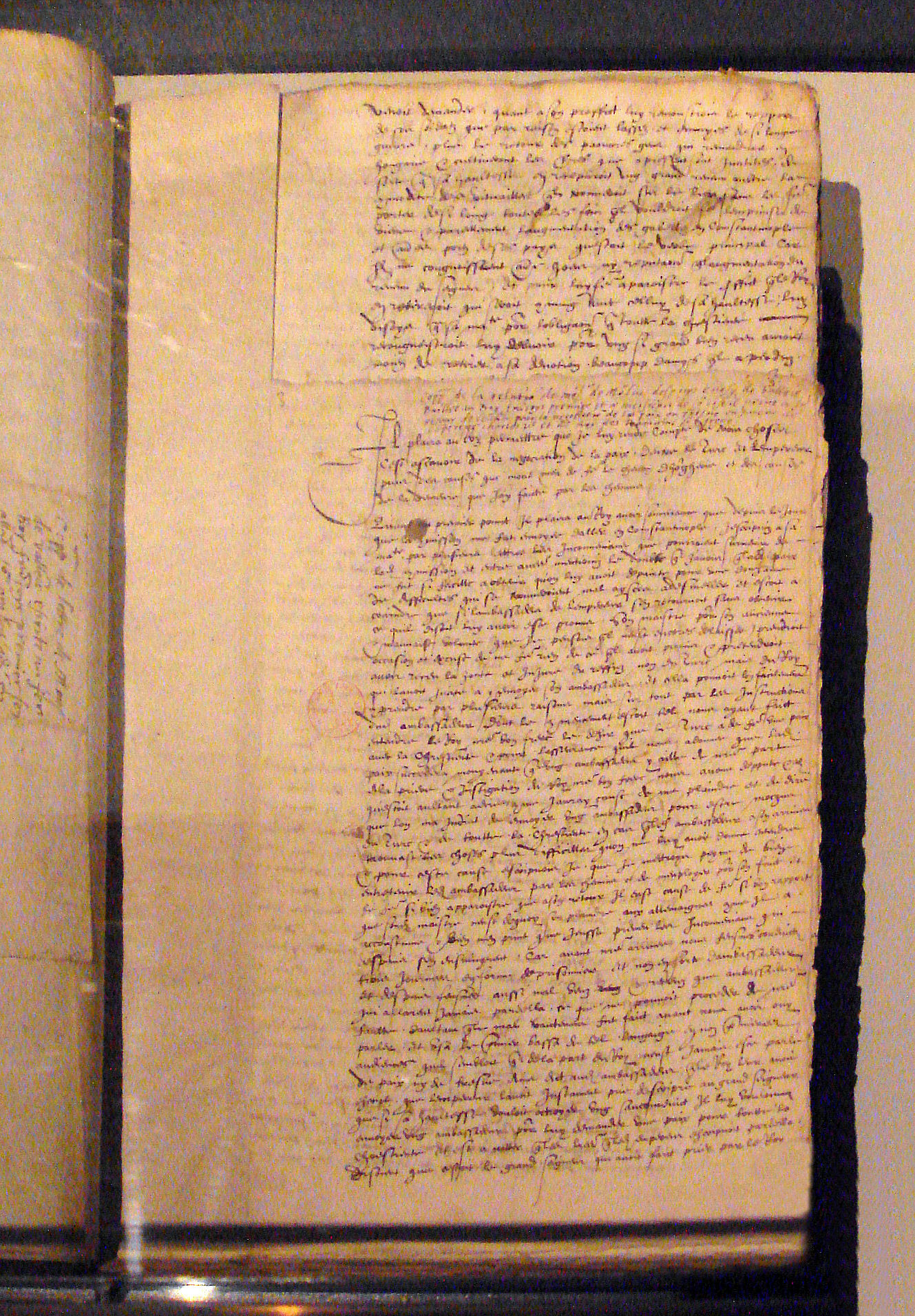
Montluc's 1545 report on his mission to the Ottoman Empire

In 1549 Montluc went to Ireland to investigate reports that Con O'Neill, O'Doherty, Manus O'Donnell and his son Calvagh might join with France against English rule. France would offer military support and obtain Papal funding. He then went to Scotland and met Mary of Guise at Stirling Castle in January 1550. His colleague Raymond de Beccarie de Pavie, sieur de Fourqueveaux was not impressed by the Irish chiefs.

== Bishop ==
Montluc was appointed bishop of Valence-and-Die by King Henry II of France in 1553, and confirmed by Pope Julius III on 30 March 1554. He did not visit his diocese, however, until 1558. He was sympathetic to the Protestants, attacked the cult of images, and made prayers in French, thereby earning him the opprobrium of Rome. He advocated a reunion of Protestantism and Catholicism through the establishment of a common council. The Dean of the Cathedral of Valence collected the evidence and lodged charges of heresy against Monluc in Rome. Sentence was pronounced against him on 14 October 1560. In the same year, on 25 May, a great slaughter of Protestants took place in Valence.

In August 1562 Monluc planned to stop in Valence during one of his trips, but the city was governed by Huguenots, and its captain pursued Monluc, intending to arrest and imprison him. Monluc got away, it seemed, to Annonay, but it too was in the hands of the Huguenots, who chased after and captured him; but he was able to escape again.

== Mission to Scotland in 1560 ==
In April 1560, Mary, Queen of Scots and her husband Francis II of France sent Montluc to Scotland to meet the former Regent of Scotland, the Earl of Arran. Arran was the leader of the Protestant Lords of the Congregation who had risen against the Catholic rule of Mary of Guise during the Scottish Reformation. Montluc first went to London to meet Elizabeth I of England, then travelled with Henry Killigrew to Berwick upon Tweed on 6 April. They met the Duke of Norfolk who was directing English military operations in Scotland in support of the Protestants. Killigrew wrote a note to William Cecil which mentions that he had deliberately taken the journey north as slowly as possible, riding forty miles in a day rather than sixty. During the ride, Montluc told Killigrew that he was offended by Elizabeth's efforts to delay him in London, while her army, enabled by the treaty of Berwick had entered Scotland.

Montluc gave Norfolk a letter from Elizabeth with instructions to give him safe conduct to Mary of Guise. Norfolk wrote that this would be difficult, because Arran was in the field, the Dowager was in Edinburgh Castle and the French were in Leith. On the same day Norfolk got news of the battle at Restalrig that commenced the siege of Leith. By 12 April, still in Berwick, Montluc told Killigrew that he thought Elizabeth would drive the French from Scotland, and this was the worst of his "imbassagis" and would be his undoing. Eventually, Montluc boasted to Killigrew that no man could end the difference by treaty better than he could, and privately told him that he was prepared to make concessions including a French withdrawal from Scotland, excepting the garrisons of Inchkeith and Dunbar Castle. Killigrew went into Scotland alone, and spoke to Mary of Guise and the Scottish Lords, securing a hearing for Jean, so "that the world shall not say but that he was heard."

The Lords of the Congregation allowed Montluc to enter Scotland on 20 April. Norfolk gave him an eight-day pass to Haddington and the English camp at Leith (Restalrig Deanery). Grey of Wilton let him see Mary of Guise, but prevented him going into Leith and conferring with the French commanders, Henri Cleutin, de Martiques and Jacques de la Brosse.Amongst the Protestant leaders, he spoke to the Earl of Morton and Mary's half-brother Lord James. Amongst his proposals, he asked that the Lords of the Congregation dissolve their league with England, meaning February's treaty of Berwick. Their response was to renew their alliance in a "bande amongst the nobilitie of Scotland" on 27 April 1560, which declared their religious aims and intent to "take plain part with the Queen of England's army."

Montluc was in Newcastle on 10 June and with another French diplomat, de Randan, had a conference with Cecil, and Dr Nicolas Wotton. With a second commission from Mary and Francis he returned to Scotland in June 1560, and took part in the peace talks which culminated in the Treaty of Edinburgh, which he signed "J. Monlucius episcopus Valentinus" on behalf of France, and resulted in the evacuation of French troops from Scotland. The English diplomat Thomas Randolph reported to Killigrew that his bishop had great honour by English and Scots, and was "royally banqueted and entertained."

== Inquisition ==
At the assembly of Fontainebleau in 1560, Monluc was one of the leaders speaking in favor of Condé's demand for full liberty for Protestants. He also participated in the Colloquy of Poissy in September 1561.

On 13 April 1563, Jean de Monluc and seven other French bishops were summoned to Rome by decree of Pope Pius IV to be examined on charges of heresy by the Roman and Universal Inquisition. Failure to appear would incur excommunication and deprivation of all of their benefices. The principal charge against Monluc was adoption of doctrines of Calvinism. Théodore de Bèze had said of Monluc that, preaching in his own diocese, he had made a mixture of the two doctrines and cast blame overtly on several abuses of the Papacy. Three of his publications had incurred the censure of the Faculty of Theology of the Sorbonne, his Instructions chrestiennes (1561), the Sermons de l'evesque de Valence (editions of 1557 and 1559), and the Sermons servants a decouvrir... les fautes... de la loy (1559). He had been the one to convince the Cardinal de Lorraine to have the Protestants invited to the Colloquy of Poissy in 1561, and he had been one of the bishops who had refused to attend the Mass presided over by the Cardinal d'Armagnac and to receive Holy Communion.

Monluc's most prominent defender and protector, however, was the Queen Mother, Catherine de Médicis, who desired above all peace and stability for the sake of her fragile dynasty. She espoused the notion that Catholics and Huguenots could reason together on their doctrinal differences, and live together in loyalty and service to the Crown. Monluc was her most eager agent. She informed the Papal Nuntius, Prospero de Santacroce, that she was intervening as the natural guardian of the Liberties of the Gallican Church, and that such disputes should be adjudicated and settled in France, not sent to Rome. A dispute over jurisdiction arose between France and the Papacy, but ultimately Pius IV (1559-1565) did nothing to press the issue.

The bishop was declared a heretic and deprived of his benefices, including the Bishopric of Valence-and-Die, on 11 October 1566 by Pope Pius V (Michele Ghislieri, O.P.). To make certain of his safety, Monluc procured a mandate signed by King Charles IX, granting him relief from appeal, and forbidding any judges, royal agents, or any members of the Chapter of the Diocese of Valence-et-Die to receive or obey any instructions from the new pope, Pius V, or the Roman Inquisition without first having submitted them to the King for his judgment and consent.

== Diplomat again ==
In 1572–1573, Jean de Monluc was the French envoy in Poland to negotiate the election of Henry of Valois, future Henry III of France, on the Polish throne, in exchange for military support against Russia, diplomatic assistance in dealing with the Ottoman Empire, and financial help. He was not eager and tried to refuse, preferring to direct negotiations from Paris, but Queen Catherine was insistent. Monluc departed Paris on 17 August, the day before the marriage of Henry of Navarre and Marguerite d'Angoulême. He was at Saint-Dizier, where he had fallen ill with dysentery, when he heard the news of the Saint Bartholomew's Day Massacre. He wrote immediately to the Court, demanding a full account of what had happened, knowing that he would have to answer many questions from hostile persons during his trip and during the negotiations in Poland. He was arrested at Saint-Mihiel in Lorraine and taken to prison in Verdun, under the suspicion that he was involved in the massacre. He wrote to Catherine de Médicis on 1 September, and shortly the King sent orders for his release. He was again detained in Frankfurt by some disgruntled German Huguenot troops, complaining that they had never been paid. He finally arrived in Poland at the end of October, where he found widespread plague. The French court, having heard of the horror caused by the massacre, and believing that Monluc needed help, sent Gilles de Noailles, brother of François de Noailles, former bishop of Dax, whose star had fallen along with that of Cardinal Odet de Chatillon and who had been declared heretic by Pope Pius IV at the recommendation of the head of the Roman Inquisition Michele Ghislieri (the future Pope Pius V). Monluc, fearing the loss of his own prestige, tried to refuse the help, but de Noailles was sent anyway.

Negotiations were slow. There were several candidates, and the Polish nobility expected to be wooed and bribed from every direction. There were Protestant and Catholic interests at work. A quick election would cut short their game. They all affected to be shocked and scandalized by the St. Bartholomew's Day Massacre. Monluc gave two notable speeches (harangues), one before a plenary session of the Polish nobility on 10 April 1573, and the other before the Estates of Poland on 25 April, which contributed materially to the success of his diplomacy. Henry of Valois was elected King of Poland on 16 May 1573.

The Bishop of Valence later wrote his own narrative of his heroic efforts, Election du Roy Henry III, roy de Pologne, décrite par Jean de Monluc, Évêque de Valence (Paris 1574). The story was also told in the memoires of Monluc's secretary, Jean Choisnin (Paris 1789).

In 1576–1577, Jean de Monluc took part in the Estates of Blois. He spoke in December on the proposal to revoke the edict of pacification and resume the war against the Huguenots.

== Death ==
In 1578, beginning on 12 April, a meeting of the Estates of Languedoc took place at Béziers, under the presidency of Abbot Pierre Dufaur the Vicar-General of Cardinal d'Armagnac, Archbishop of Toulouse. Bishop de Monluc participated and gave a speech.

Jean de Monluc died on 13 April 1579 in Toulouse, where he had come to make a report to the Queen Mother. He had been reconciled to the Roman Catholic Church by a Jesuit.

Bishop Jean de Monluc left a natural son, Jean de Montluc de Balagny (d. 1603), seigneur de Balagny, who was at first a zealous member of the League, but later made his submission to Henry IV, and received from him the principality of Cambrai and, in 1594, the baton of a marshal of France.

== See also ==
- Jean de Montluc, Wikipedia-France
- Franco-Ottoman alliance

== Books and articles ==
- Bain, Joseph, ed. (1898). Calendar of the State Papers relating to Scotland and Mary Queen of Scots 1547–1603. Vol. 1. H.M. General Register House Edinburgh. p. 328–463, 801. (Page 801 is the index page. Montluc is indexed under Valence, Bishop of which is how he is referred to within the Calendar).
- Chadwick, Owen (2003). The Early Reformation on the Continent. Oxford University Press. p. 227. ISBN 978-0-19-926578-7.
- Charrière, Ernest, ed. (1848). Négociations de la France dans le Levant ou Correspondances, mémoires et actes diplomatiques des ambassadeurs de France à Constantinople et des ambassadeurs, envoyés ou résidents à divers titres à Venise, Raguse, Rome, Malte et Jérusalem ... (in French). Vol. Tome I. Paris: Impr. nationale. pp. 323–331. [The Levant assignment, 1537]
- Choisnin, Jean (1789). Mémoires de Jean Choisnin, secrétaire de Montluc, eveque de Valence (in French). Paris. [apologetic]
- Degert, Antoine (1904a). "Procès de huit évêques français suspects de Calvinisme". Revue des questions historiques. New series (in French). 32 (86): 61–108.
- Degert, Antoine (1904b). "Évêques gascons devant l' Inquistion Romaine". Revue de Gascogne. New series (in French). 4 (45): 410–437, especially 415-419.
- Dyer, Thomas Henry (1861). The history of modern Europe from the fall of Constantinople. Vol. 1. J. Murray. p. 605. [obsolete]
- Garnier, Edith (2008). L'Alliance Impie. Editions du Felin. ISBN 978-2-86645-678-8.
- Hauréau, Barthélemy, ed. (1865). Gallia Christiana: In Provincias Ecclesiasticas Distributa, De provincia Viennensi (in Latin). Vol. Tomus XVI. Paris: Typographia Regia. pp. 332–335.
- Heller, Henry (1986). The Conquest of Poverty: The Calvinist Revolt in Sixteenth Century France. Brill. ISBN 90-04-07598-4.
- Nugent, Donald (1974). Ecumenism in the age of the Reformation: the Colloquy of Poissy. Harvard University Press. ISBN 978-0-674-23725-4.
- Poujoulat, Jean-Joseph-François, ed. (1838). Nouvelle collection des mémoires pour servir à l'histoire de France depuis le XIIIe siècle jusqu'à la fin du XVIIIe... (in French). Vol. Tome onzième. Paris: L'editeur du Commentaire analytique du Code Civil. pp. 443–465. [Choisnin's memoirs; the two harangues before the Polish Diet in 1573]
- Reynaud, Hector (1893). Jean de Monluc, évêque de Valence et de Die: Essai d'histoire littéraire (in French). Paris: Thorin.
- Tamizey de Larroque, Philippe (1868). Notes et documents inédits pour servir a la biographie de Jean de Monluc: évêque de Valence (in French). Paris: Auguste Aubry.
