= Étienne Charles de Loménie de Brienne =

18th-century French politician and bishop

His Eminence Étienne Charles de Loménie de Brienne
- Archbishop of Sens
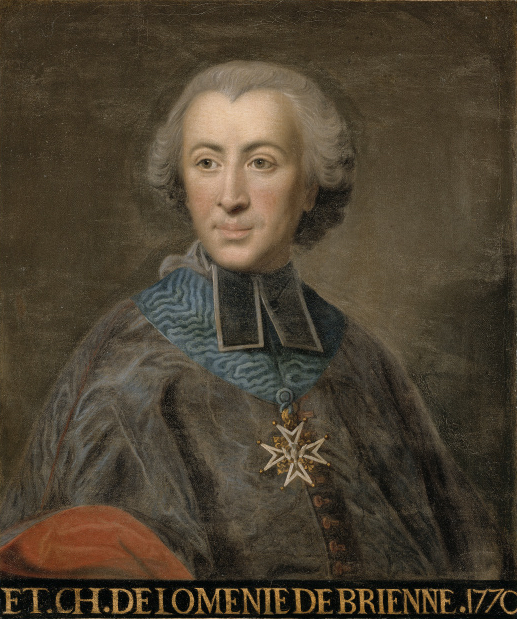
- In office: 1788–1790
- Predecessor: Paul d'Albert de Luynes
- Successor: Anne Louis Henri de La Fare
- Previous posts: Archbishop of Toulouse (1763–88); Bishop of Condom (1760–63)

Orders
- Ordination: 8 March 1752
- Consecration: 11 January 1761 by Paul d'Albert de Luynes
- Created cardinal: 15 December 1788 by Pope Pius VI
- Rank: Cardinal-Priest

Personal details
- Born: 9 October 1727 Paris, France
- Died: 19 February 1794 (aged 66) Sens, France

Chief Minister of France
- In office 1 May 1787 – 25 August 1788
- Monarch: Louis XVI
- Preceded by: Count of Vergennes
- Succeeded by: Jacques Necker

Étienne Charles de Loménie de Brienne (French: [etjɛn ʃaʁl də lɔmeni də bʁijɛn]; 9 October 1727 – 19 February 1794) was a French clergyman, bishop, cardinal, politician and finance minister of King Louis XVI. He was widely believed by his contemporaries — though not universally — to have been an atheist.

== Life ==
=== Early career ===
He was born in Paris, in the Loménie family from Flavignac, some twenty kilometres from the city of Limoges, in the Limousin region of France, currently part of Nouvelle-Aquitaine. Their origins have been traced back there to the 15th century.

The Loménie de Brienne were the junior branch of the Loménie family and had succeeded in implanting themselves into the world of the French royal court over several centuries. They had been ennobled in 1552 when Martial de Loménie became secretary to King Henry II of France, and later acquired the lordship of Versailles (1561–1571). By an advantageous marriage in 1623 the Loménie became counts of Brienne. They continued in high ranking positions in the state, occupying important government posts in foreign affairs under Louis XIV and towards the end of the Ancien régime at the ministry of war. Charles-François de Loménie de Brienne was Bishop of Coutances (1668–1720) and their adopted cousin Pierre-François de Loménie was briefly to be Coadjutor Archbishop of Sens (1789–1794).

A capable student, Étienne-Charles entered the clergy, seeing this as the path to attaining a distinguished position. In 1751 he became a doctor of theology, though there were doubts as to the orthodoxy of his thesis. The same year he was appointed vicar general (grand vicaire) to the Cardinal Archbishop of Rouen, Nicolas de Saulx-Tavannes. After visiting Rome, he was made Bishop of Condom on 19 December 1760, and on 21 March 1763 was translated to become Archbishop of Toulouse. In the years 1766 to 1769, he was commendatory Abbot of Mont-Saint-Michel Abbey, and from 1788 commendatory Abbot of Corbie. In 1772, he chaired the Commission des Réguliers, set up to suppress religious houses that were in terminal decline.

His many famous friends included A.R.J. Turgot, André Morellet and Voltaire, and in 1770 he was elected to the Académie française. He was three times head of the bureau de jurisdiction at the general assembly of the clergy. He also took a lively interest in political and social questions of the day, and addressed to Turgot a number of memoires on these subjects, including one on pauperism.

=== Alleged atheism ===
Though some contest the suggestion, Loménie de Brienne was frequently believed to be an unbeliever from the outset. In 1781, at the death of the Archbishop of Paris, Christophe de Beaumont, there was a lobby to make Loménie de Brienne his successor, but Louis XVI refused, allegedly exclaiming: ‘The Archbishop of Paris should at least believe in God!'.

=== Politics ===
Arms of the Loménie de Brienne family

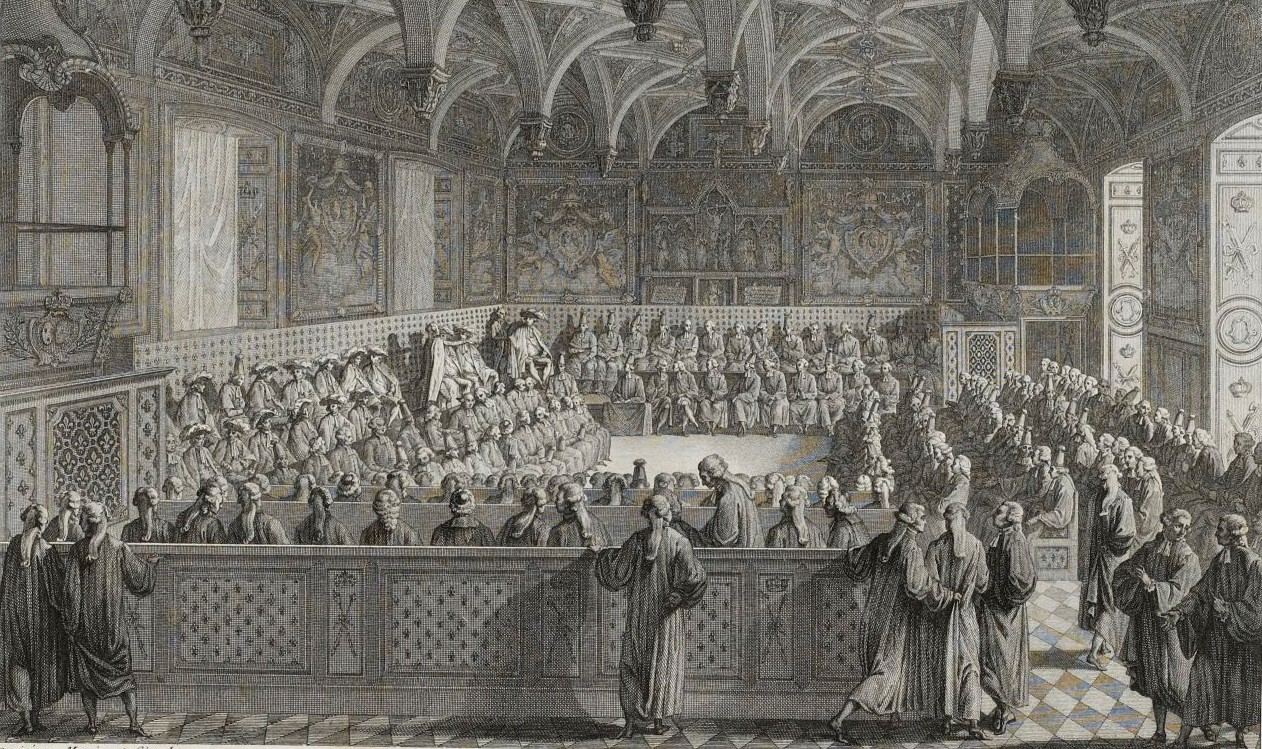
Louis XVI le 19 novembre 1787 – Musée de la Révolution française

In 1787, in the Assembly of Notables, Loménie de Brienne led the opposition to the fiscal policy of Calonne. Close to Queen Marie-Antoinette, Loménie de Brienne was then appointed to succeed him during deliberations by nobles held on 25 May 1787. Once in power, he succeeded in making the parlement register edicts dealing with internal free trade, the establishment of provincial assemblies and the redemption of the corvée. In May 1788 the process of tax collection was faulting and the loyalty of the army was slipping. As a result, Louis XVI suspended parlements in May 1788 and created 47 courts. When the parlement refused to register edicts on the stamp duty and the proposed new general land-tax, Loménie de Brienne persuaded Louis XVI to hold a lit de justice to enforce their registration. The king also agreed to exile the parlement to Troyes (18 August 1787) as a further measure to crush opposition. When the parlement agreed to prolong the direct tax on all kinds of income, the councillors were recalled to Paris. A further attempt to force the parlement to register an edict for raising a loan of 120 million livres met with determined opposition. The struggle of the parlement against Loménie de Brienne ended on 8 May in its consenting to an edict for its own abolition, with the proviso that the Estates General should be summoned to remedy the disorders of the state. Loménie de Brienne resigned as finance minister on 25 August 1788.

Loménie de Brienne, who had in the meantime been made Archbishop of Sens (confirmed by Rome on 10 March 1788), now faced almost universal political opposition. He was forced to suspend the Cour plenière which had been set up to take the place of the parlement, and to promise that the States General should be summoned. Even these concessions were not enough to keep him in power, and on 29 August he had to retire, leaving the treasury empty.

On 14 September 1788 the publicly-hated Guillaume-Chrétien de Lamoignon de Malesherbes was finally recalled, and this led to renewed energy on the part of revolutionaries, who began rioting in Paris. Rioters tried to burn down the homes of both Lamoignon and Brienne.

=== Rise and fall ===
On 15 December following, he was made a cardinal, and went to Italy, where he spent two years.

An adopted nephew, Pierre-François de Loménie, was appointed at his request Coadjutor of the diocese in his absence. Étienne-Charles consecrated him. He was to follow his uncle in swearing the oath to the Civil Constitution of the Clergy, but along with other members of the family the coadjutor was guillotined on 10 May 1794, having in the meantime repented of his submission.

After the outbreak of the French Revolution Étienne-Charles returned to France, and took the oath of the Civil Constitution of the Clergy in 1790, one of the few bishops of the Ancien regime to do so, and he encouraged many of his priests to do the same. Subsequently, he had himself elected constitutional Bishop of the Yonne department. He was repudiated by Pope Pius VI, and in 1791 at the Pope's insistence resigned in pique as a cardinal, just in time to avoid being stripped of the dignity.

He bought the former Abbey of Saint-Pierre-le-Vif in the city centre of Sens and had the majestic church, burial place of his predecessors as Archbishop of Sens, demolished, installing himself in the abbot's house with members of his family. He had a gift for winning popularity and a section of the local population were his ardent supporters. Nevertheless, the days even of the Constitutional Church were soon done. Though he had refused to ordain constitutional bishops, at the height of the Revolution, on 15 November 1793, he renounced the priesthood, but his past and present conduct made him an object of suspicion to the then prominent revolutionaries. He was arrested at Sens on 18 February 1794, and that same night died in prison, whether from a stroke or by poison, some said by suicide, though the shock of the failure of his bravado and all his frantic efforts at survival would perhaps have been enough to kill him.

== Works ==
The chief works published by Loménie de Brienne are:

- Oraison funébre du Dauphin (Paris, 1766)
- Compte-rendu au roi (Paris, 1788)
- Le Conciliateur, in collaboration with Turgot (Rome, Paris, 1754)
