= Jean-Louis Palladin =

French chef

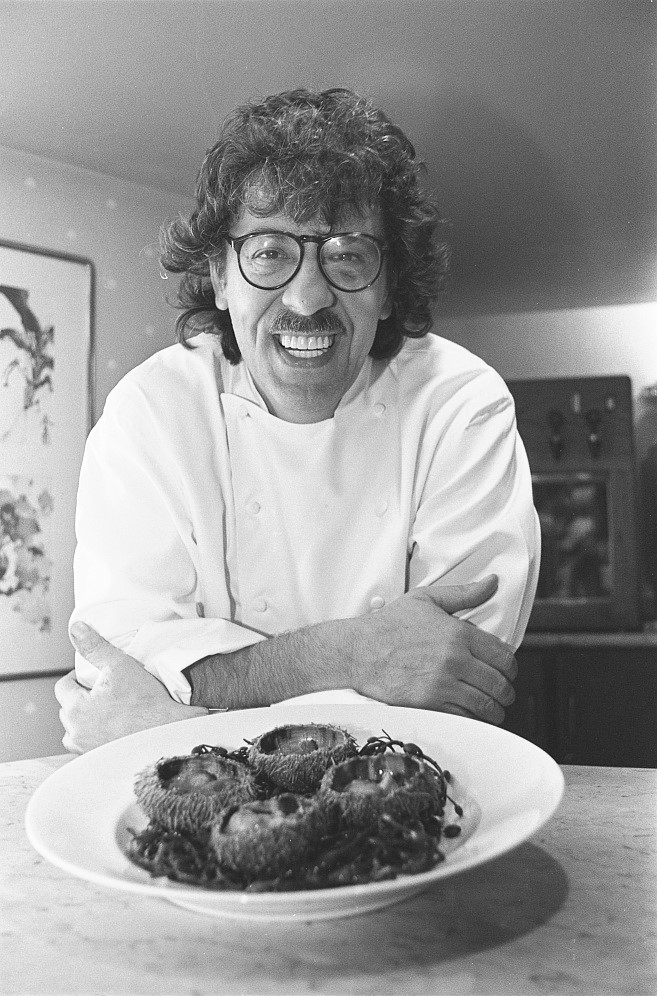
- Palladin in 1991
- Born: May 7, 1946; Condom, Gers, France
- Died: November 25, 2001 (aged 55); McLean, Virginia, United States
- Occupation: Chef
- Known for: Jean-Louis at the Watergate

Jean-Louis Palladin (May 7, 1946 – November 25, 2001) was a French-born chef who introduced French Nouvelle cuisine to the Washington elite at his restaurant, Jean-Louis at the Watergate, and influenced a generation of French and American chefs.

== Early life ==
Jean-Louis Palladin was born on May 7, 1946, in the small town of Condom, Gers in southwestern France.

Palladin attended culinary school in Toulouse and then worked in the kitchen of an Italian restaurant in Condom. The owner of the restaurant recognized Palladin's talent, and together they created a new restaurant, La Table des Cordeliers, where Palladin, at 28 years of age, would become the youngest chef in France to earn two Michelin stars.

== Jean-Louis at the Watergate ==
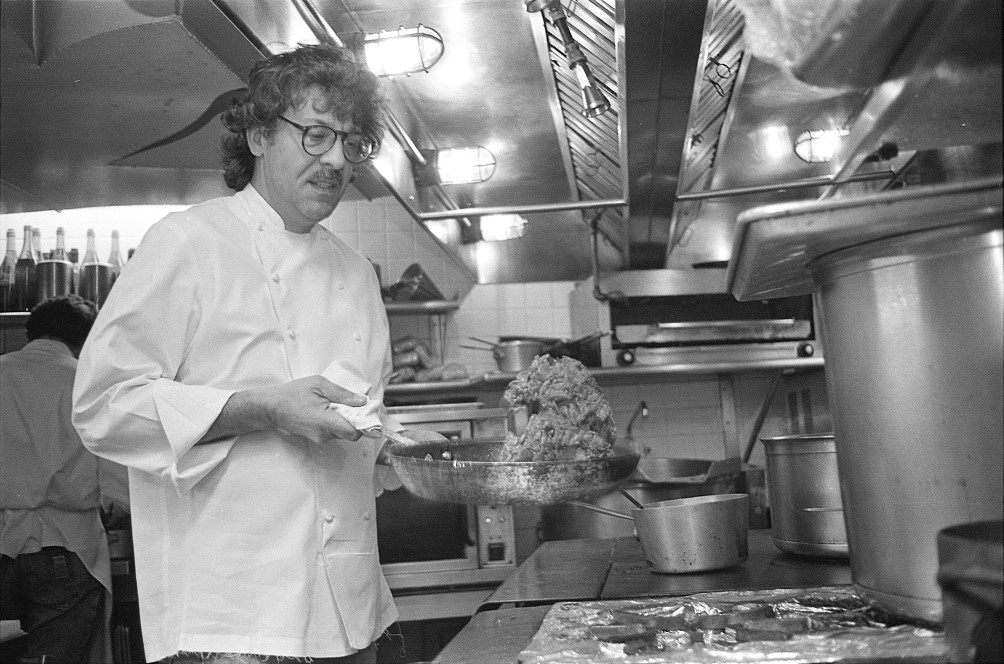
Palladin cooking at the Watergate in 1991

In 1979, Palladin was recruited to the United States to open a restaurant at the Watergate hotel. Jean-Louis at the Watergate soon became the "in" place for Washington's politicians and socialites. Its reputation blossomed during the Ronald Reagan administration, when many of President Reagan's associates from California moved into apartments at the Watergate and made Jean-Louis their regular meeting place. President Reagan celebrated his 70th birthday at Jean-Louis at an intimate party that included actor Jimmy Stewart.

Palladin sought to incorporate American ingredients on his menu: "The challenge of cooking in America," he said in 1987, "is to discover the newest and best products from the different states -- baby eels and lamprey from Maine, fresh snails from Oregon, blowfish from the Carolinas and California oysters -- and then to learn how to integrate them into your cuisine." Jean-Louis became a destination for other prominent French and American chefs, such as Julia Child, Thomas Keller, and Daniel Boulud. Éric Ripert worked under Palladin at the Watergate for a few years.

For his cooking at the Watergate, Palladin won two James Beard Awards, including Outstanding Chef of 1993. The restaurant never made a significant profit, however, due to its small size and expensive ingredients - Jean-Louis closed on June 15, 1996.

== Later career ==
In 1993, Palladin opened a second restaurant in Washington, Pesce in Dupont Circle. In 1997, he opened a restaurant in Las Vegas, Napa at the Rio All-Suite Hotel and Casino. In 1999, he allowed his name to be used at Palladin, a restaurant in the Time Hotel in New York City.

== Death and legacy ==
Palladin died of lung cancer on November 25, 2001, at his home in McLean, Virginia. He was survived by two children, Olivier and Verveine Palladin.

Palladin's colleagues and friends created a foundation in his name in 2002, which was subsumed under the James Beard Foundation in 2009. The Foundation administers the Jean-Louis Palladin Professional Work/Study Initiative in Palladin's honor.

== Awards ==
- 1974 Michelin Stars for La Table des Cordeliers (Condom, Gers, France), the Michelin Guide.
- 1984 Wine Spectator Grand Award.
- 1987 Who's Who of Food and Beverage in the United States.
- 1991 Best Chef, Mid-Atlantic, James Beard Foundation Award.
- 1993 Outstanding Chef, James Beard Foundation Award.

== Cookbook ==
Jean-Louis, Cooking With the Seasons, Thomasson-Grant (1989).
