= Estillac =

- Commune
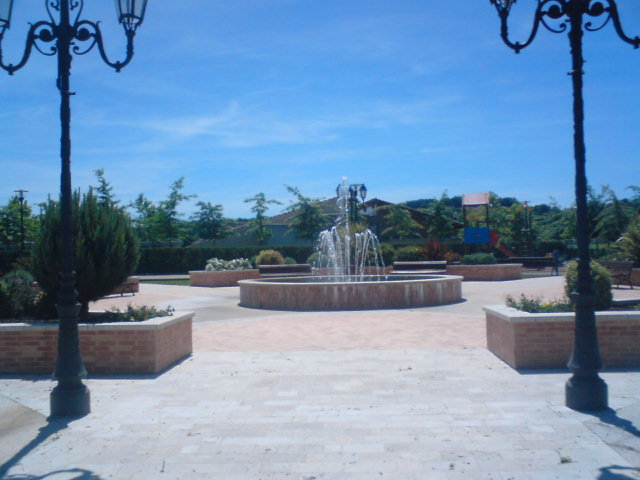
- The village square

- Coat of arms
- Location of Estillac
- Location within France Location within Nouvelle-Aquitaine
- Coordinates: 44°09′27″N 0°33′55″E
- Country: France
- Region: Nouvelle-Aquitaine
- Department: Lot-et-Garonne
- Arrondissement: Agen
- Canton: L'Ouest agenais
- Intercommunality: Agglomération d'Agen

Government
  - Mayor (2020–2026): Jean-Marc Gilly
- Area^{1}: 7.94 km^{2} (3.07 sq mi)
- Elevation: 150 m (490 ft)
- Highest elevation: 164 m (538 ft)
- Lowest elevation: 54 m (177 ft)
- Population (2023): 2,463
  - Density: 310/km^{2} (803/sq mi)
- Time zone: UTC+01:00 (CET)
  - Summer (DST): UTC+02:00 (CEST)
- INSEE/Postal code: 47091 /47310
- ^{1} French Land Register data, which excludes lakes, ponds, glaciers > 1 km^{2} (0.386 sq mi or 247 acres) and river estuaries.

Estillac (French pronunciation: [ɛstijak]; Occitan: Estilhac) is a commune in the Lot-et-Garonne department in south-western France.

== Population ==
Historical population
Year	Pop.	±% p.a.
1968	770	—
1975	897	+2.20%
1982	990	+1.42%
1990	1,182	+2.24%
1999	1,307	+1.12%
2007	1,621	+2.73%
2012	1,947	+3.73%
2017	2,007	+0.61%
2023	2,463	+3.47%
Source: INSEE

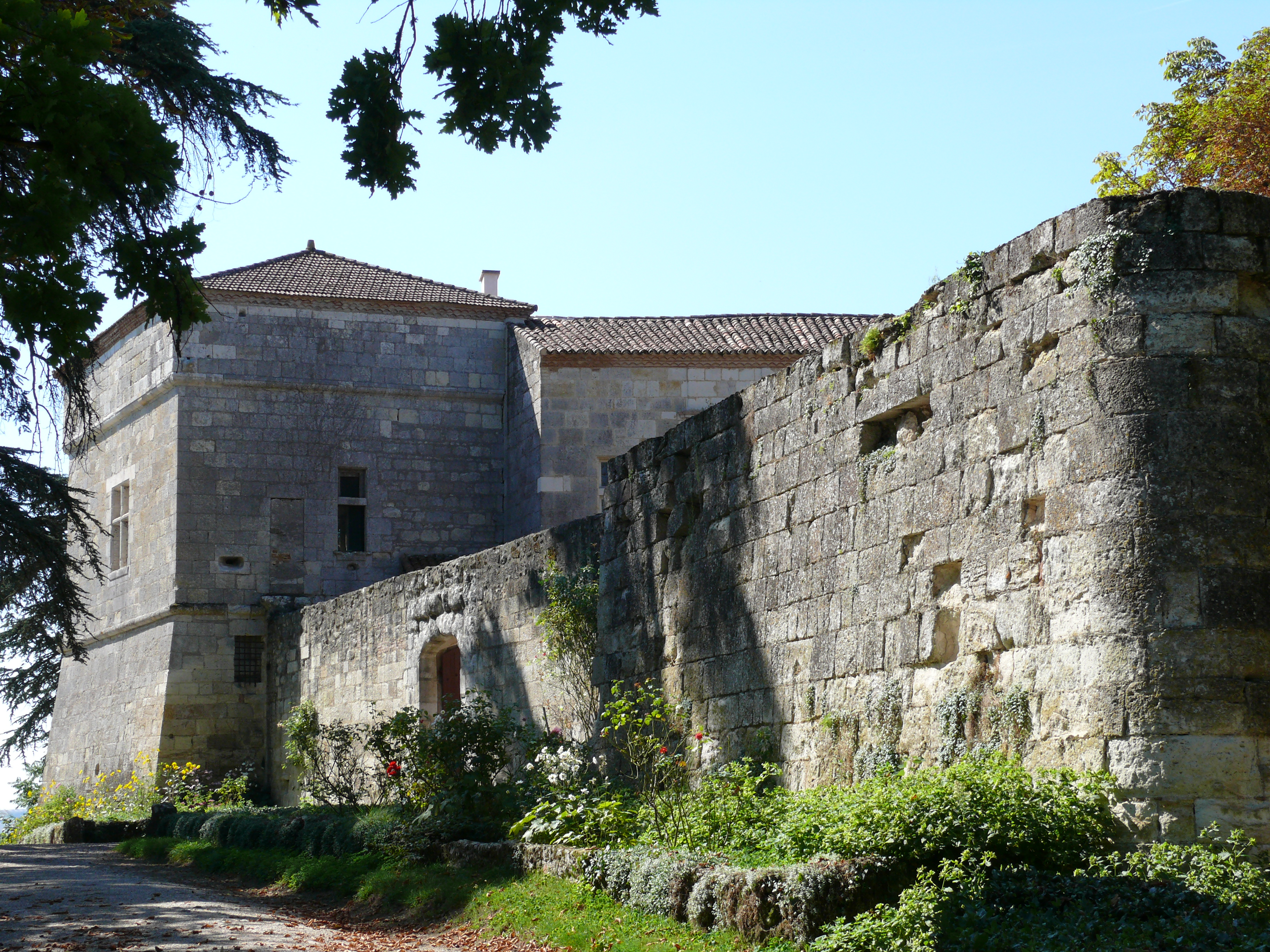
Château de Monluc, Estillac

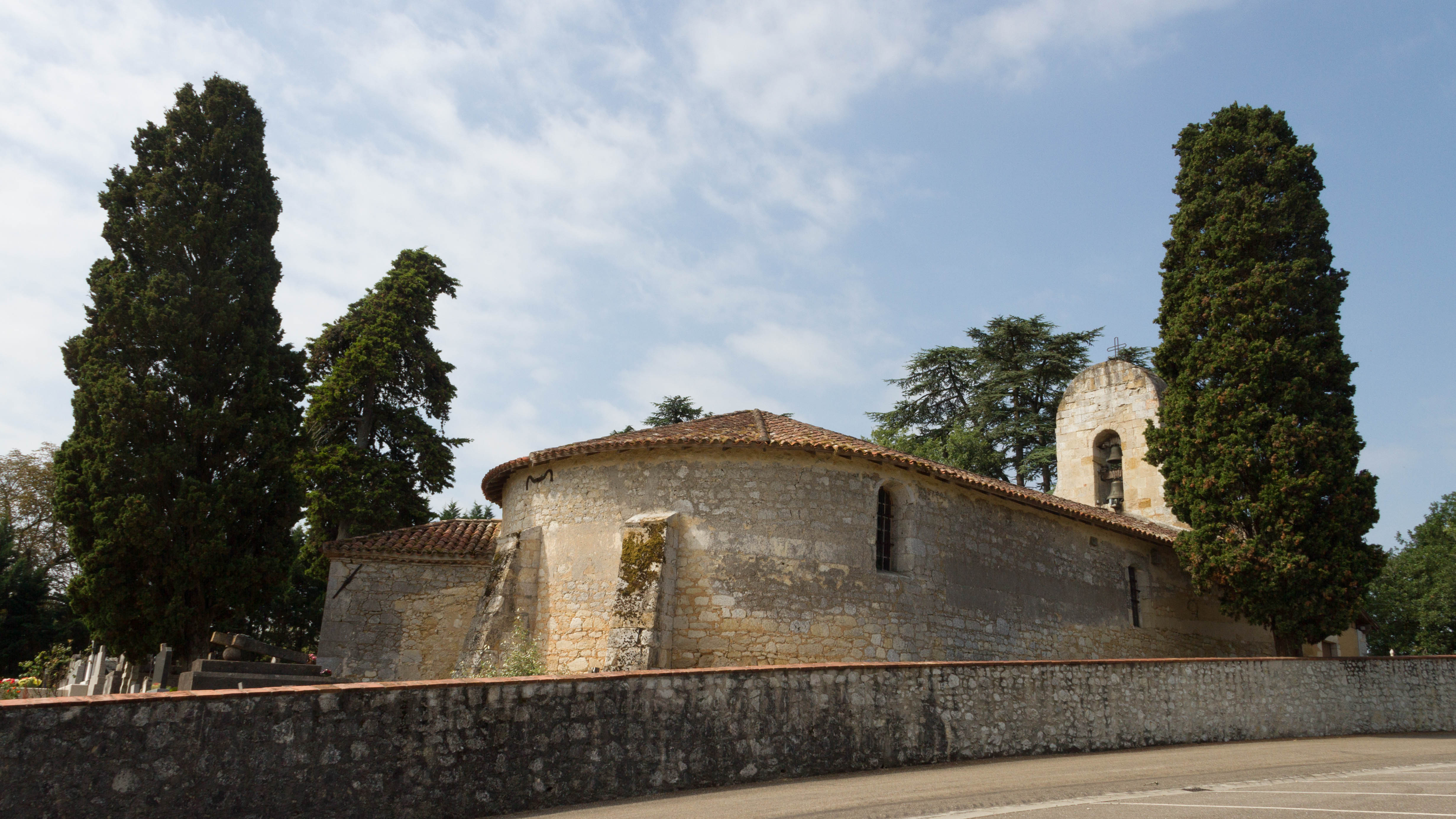
Saint-Jean-Baptiste Church

== See also ==
- Communes of the Lot-et-Garonne department
