= Saint-Puy =

- Commune
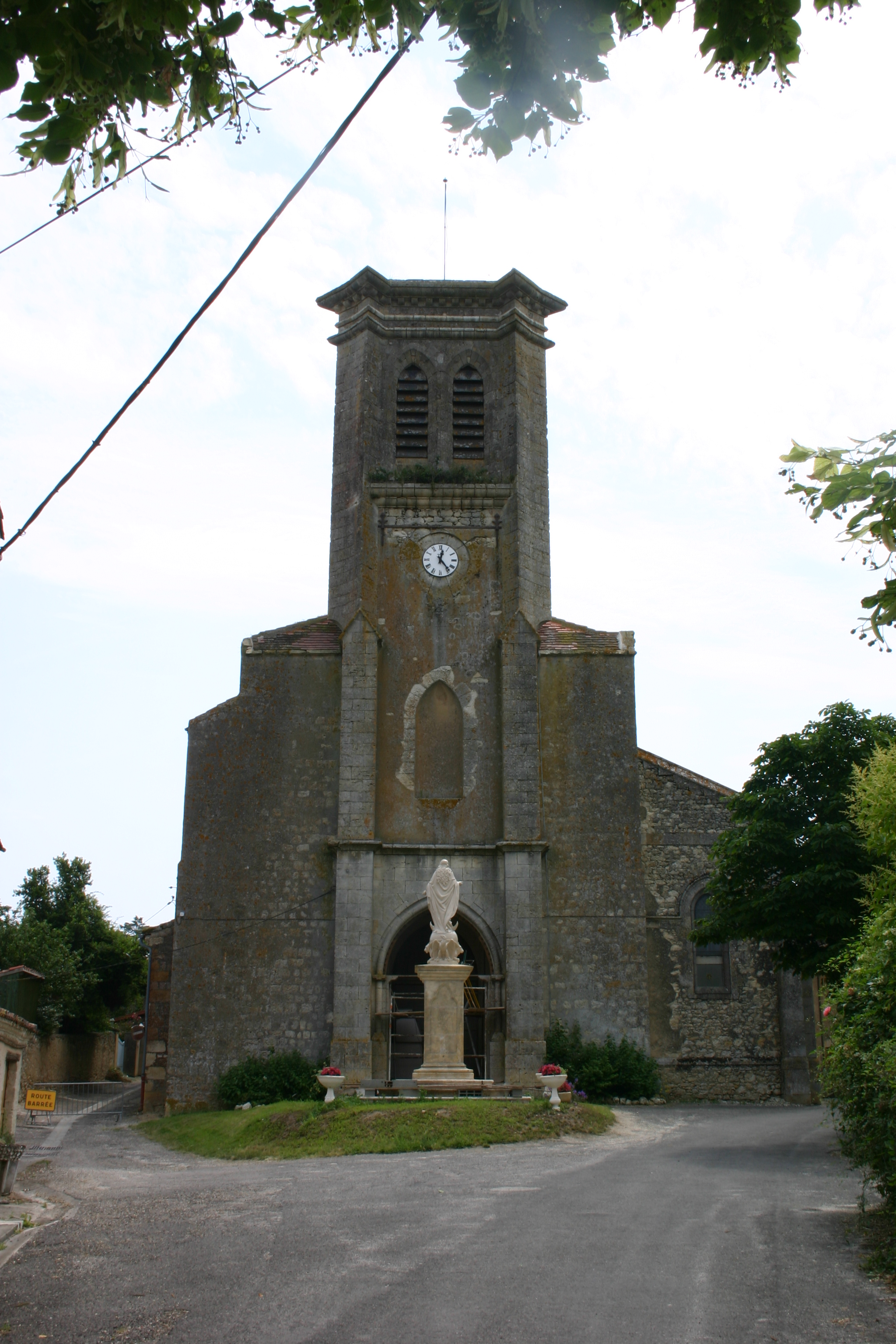
- The church in Saint-Puy

- Coat of arms
- Location of Saint-Puy
- Location within France Location within Occitanie
- Coordinates: 43°52′38″N 0°27′47″E
- Country: France
- Region: Occitania
- Department: Gers
- Arrondissement: Condom
- Canton: Baïse-Armagnac

Government
  - Mayor (2020–2026): Michel Labatut
- Area^{1}: 36.88 km^{2} (14.24 sq mi)
- Elevation: 160 m (520 ft)
- Highest elevation: 220 m (720 ft)
- Lowest elevation: 87 m (285 ft)
- Population (2023): 587
  - Density: 15.9/km^{2} (41.2/sq mi)
- Time zone: UTC+01:00 (CET)
  - Summer (DST): UTC+02:00 (CEST)
- INSEE/Postal code: 32404 /32310
- ^{1} French Land Register data, which excludes lakes, ponds, glaciers > 1 km^{2} (0.386 sq mi or 247 acres) and river estuaries.

Saint-Puy (French pronunciation: [sɛ̃ pɥi]; Occitan: Lo Sempoi) is a commune in the Gers department in southwestern France.

== Geography ==
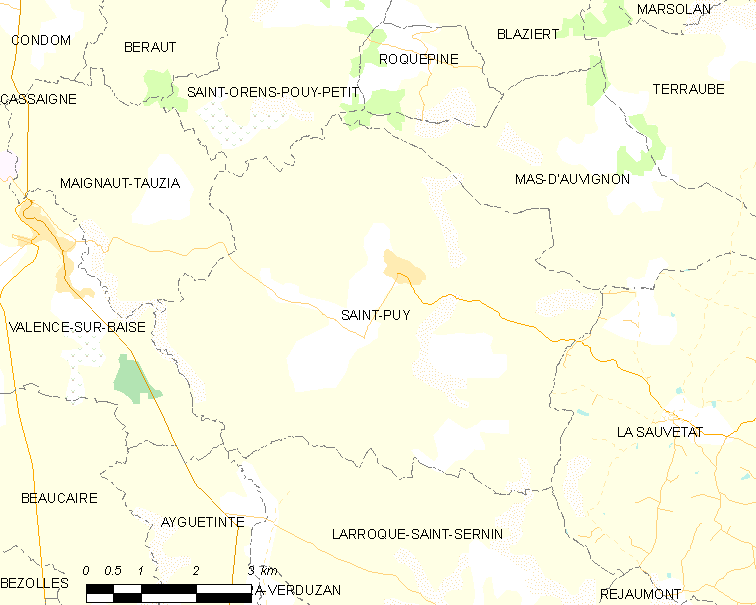
Saint-Puy and its surrounding communes

== Population ==
Historical population
Year	Pop.	±% p.a.
1968	748	—
1975	669	−1.58%
1982	601	−1.52%
1990	595	−0.13%
1999	603	+0.15%
2007	567	−0.77%
2012	586	+0.66%
2017	600	+0.47%
2023	587	−0.36%
Source: INSEE

== Notable people ==
Saint-Puy was the home of the gentleman soldier Blaise de Monluc.

== See also ==
- Communes of the Gers department
