= Condom Cathedral =

Cathedral located in Gers, France

Coordinates: 43°57′28″N 0°22′22″E

- Cathédrale Saint-Pierre de Condom
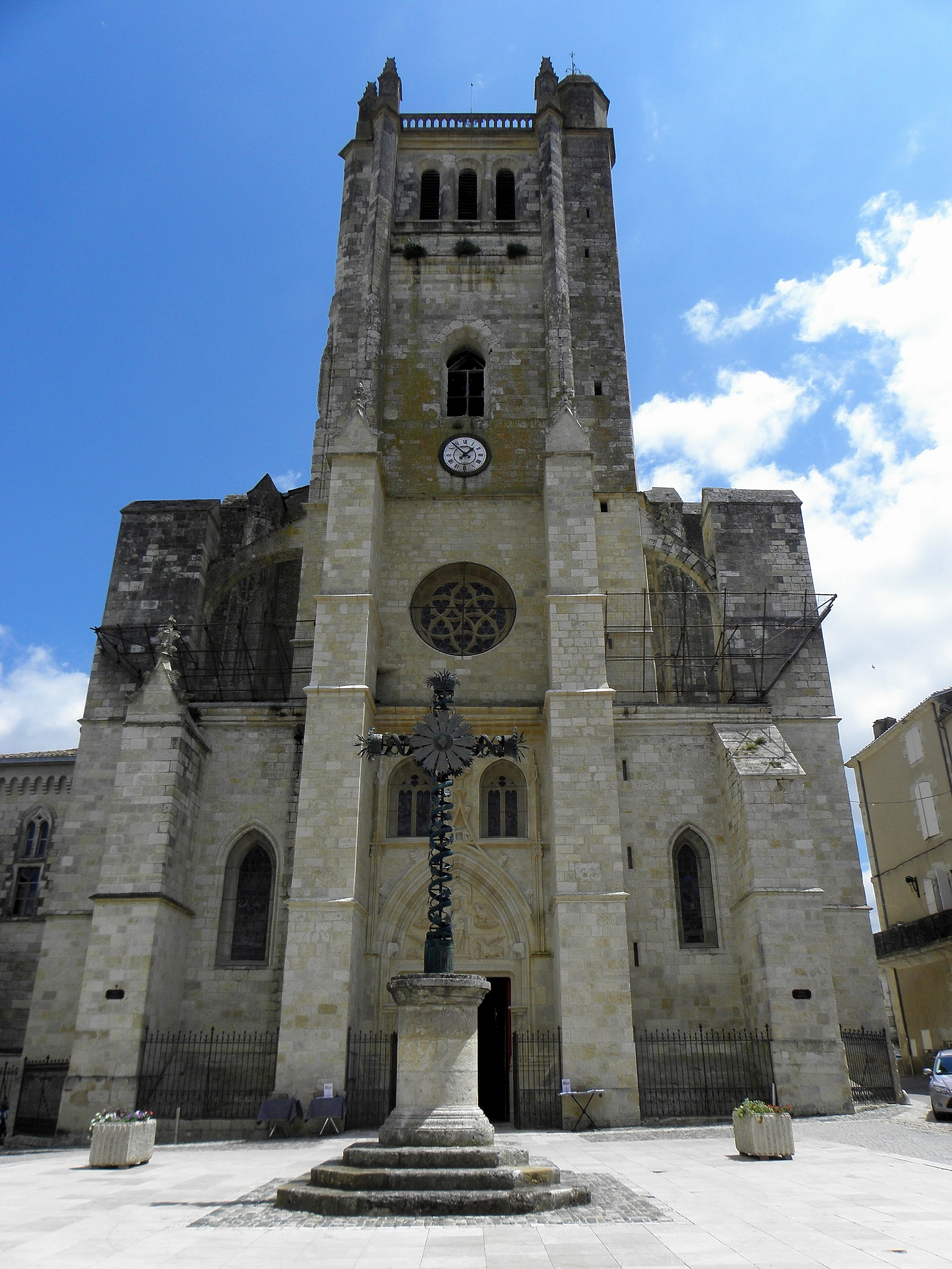
- Condom Cathedral
- Condom Cathedral
- Location: Condom, France
- Denomination: Roman Catholic Church
- Churchmanship: Roman

History
- Status: Cathedral

Architecture
- Functional status: Active
- Architectural type: church
- Style: Southern French Gothic
- Groundbreaking: 1506; 520 years ago
- Completed: 1531; 495 years ago

Administration
- Province: Bishops of Condom

Monument historique
- Official name: Cathédrale Saint-Pierre de Condom
- Type: Classé
- Designated: 1840
- Reference no.: PA00094770

Condom Cathedral (French: Cathédrale Saint-Pierre de Condom) is a Catholic church and former cathedral dedicated to Saint Peter in Condom, Gers, France. It was formerly the seat of the Bishops of Condom in 1822 and has been listed as a monument historique since 1840. It was designed at the end of the 15th century and erected from 1506 to 1531, safely making it one of the last major buildings in the Gers region to be constructed in the Southern French Gothic style of southwestern France.

== History ==
The origins of the cathedral date to the early 9th century, when a church was constructed and consecrated by Pope Leo III on a hilltop overlooking the town of Condom. Following destruction from a Norman raid in 850, Garsie, Count of Gascony, made donations for the restoration of the building which was transformed into a Benedictine abbey dedicated to Saint Peter in 1011. By the early 14th century, the abbey had evolved into the seat of the Bishopric of Condom, established by Pope John XXII, who elevated the site to a cathedral in 1317. In 1368, the abbey church was completely demolished after a papal bull issued by Pope Urban V drew attention to the poor condition of the building. Reconstruction continued until 1400 in a Gothic style. However, despite extensive reconstruction lasting over 30 years, the cathedral was nevertheless rushed to completion, and a bell tower hastily installed on the western facade partially collapsed in 1506, taking with it three chapels and sections of the roof.

Reconstruction began in 1506 shortly after the collapse. The new cathedral footprint would be based off Auch Cathedral and constructed in a Flamboyant Gothic style. The main portion of cathedral including the rib vaulted nave and stained glass windows was completed relatively quickly and consecrated in 1531, followed by the cloister and chapter house shortly afterwards. In 1569, during the Wars of Religion, the cathedral narrowly escaped total destruction but would nevertheless suffer from periodic vandalism consistent with other churches and religious sites around France.

The cathedral endured heavy damage during the French Revolution, when revolutionary forces burst into the church and completely destroyed its interior, including the organ installed in 1605. Following the Concordat of 1801, the Diocese of Condom was abolished, but the church was allowed to continue services, although demoted to parish church status. Restorations initiated in the 19th century focused on repairing damages and reinforcing the Gothic structure. Work began in 1835, starting with the repainting of the vault in 1841, the construction of a new chancel railing, and the recreation of chancel stained-glass windows. The destroyed choir was rebuilt in a Neo Gothic style inspired by Albi Cathedral, and restoration finished with the cathedral's classification as a historic monument in 1840. Unlike many other cathedrals around France, Condom Cathedral was spared from damage from both World War I and World War II.

== Architecture ==
The cathedral dominates the skyline of the town, which sits on a hill above the Baïse River. The church has buttresses all around and there is a 40-metre (130 ft) square tower over the west front. The west front door has the Four Evangelists' symbols in the tympanum, and the south nave door in the Flamboyant Gothic style has 24 small statues in the niches of the archivolt.

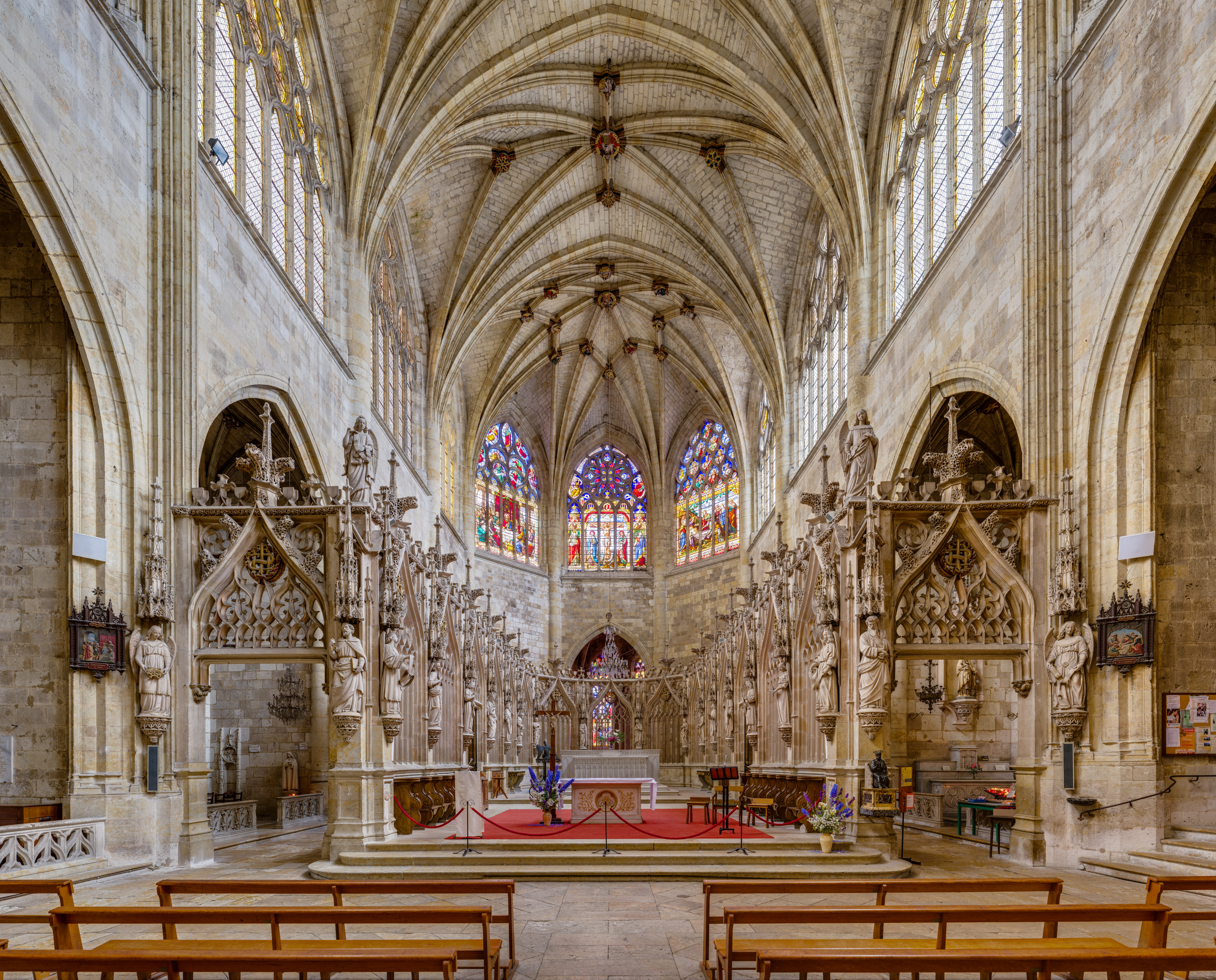
Condom Cathedral

The interior of the cathedral is organized around a wide nave plan characteristic of Gothic architecture with clerestory windows and grisaille glass. The rib vault nave consists of seven bays supported by ribbed pillars adorned with friezes. There is a neo-Gothic openwork screen from 1844 around the chancel, which demarcates it from the ambulatory. The stained glass in the choir is from the 19th century. The cathedral was famous for its 16th-century liturgy and for its reconstructed organ at the west end. This is commemorated in the choir vault bosses with figures of angel musicians. The original pulpit with its delicately carved stone baldaquin is still in place.

The 16th-century cloister is now a public passageway adjoining a car park, the exterior of which is illuminated at night.

== Bibliography ==
- Gardelles, Jacques (1992). Aquitaine gothique (in French). Paris: Picard. ISBN 2-7084-0421-0.
- Durliat, Marcel (1970). "La cathédrale et le cloître de Condom". Congrès archéologique de France. 128e session. Gascogne. 1970 (in French). Paris: Société française d'archéologie. pp. 145–163.
