= Blaise de Monluc =

French professional soldier

Blaise de Monluc Order of Saint Michael
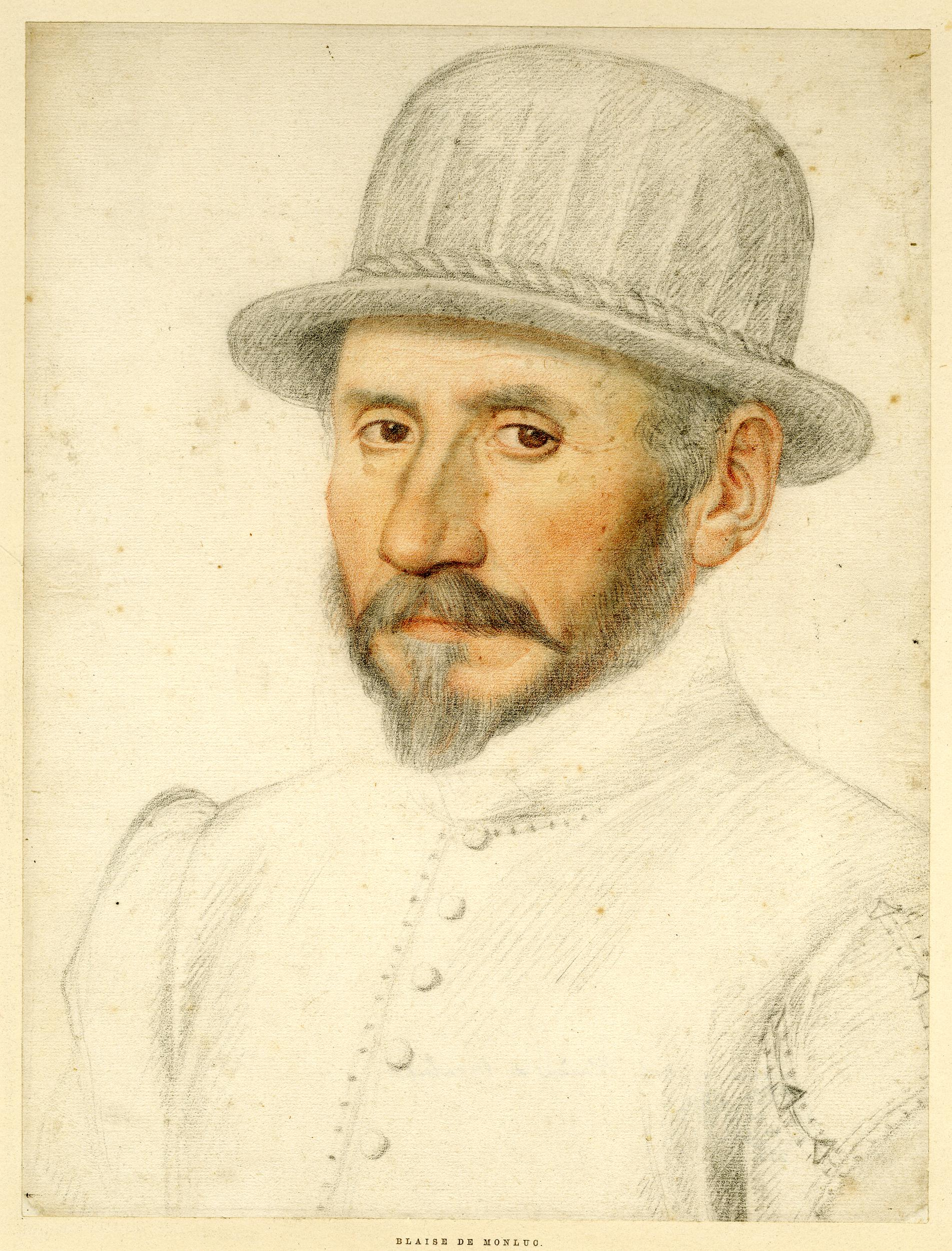
- Blaise de Monluc, 16th century painting.

Lieutenant-General of Guyenne
- In office 1562–1567

Military governor of Siena
- In office February 1554 – April 1555

Military governor of Moncalieri
- In office March 1548 – September 1549

Personal details
- Born: 1500–1502 Saint-Puy, France
- Died: 24 July 1577 Château de Monluc, Estillac, France
- Spouse(s): (1) Antoinette Ysalguier (died 1562); (2) Isabeau de Beauville
- Children: (1) Four sons, three daughters; (2) Three daughters
- Occupation: Soldier

Military service
- Rank: Marshal of France 1574
- Battles/wars: Italian Wars; Pavia 1525; Naples 1528 (WIA); Defence of Marseille 1536; Perpignan 1542; Ceresole 1544; Boulogne 1546; Siege of Siena 1555; Thionville 1558; French Wars of Religion; Vergt 1562

Blaise de Monluc, also known as Blaise de Lasseran-Massencôme, seigneur de Monluc, (c. 1502 – 24 July 1577) was a Gascon French professional soldier, government official, and nobleman. His career began in 1521 and reached the rank of marshal of France in 1574. Written between 1570 and 1576, an account of his life titled Commentaires de Messire Blaise de Monluc was published in 1592, and remains an important historical source for 16th century warfare.

Born into a family of impoverished Gascon nobility, he rose to prominence during the Italian Wars and was appointed Lieutenant-General of Guyenne in January 1562, shortly before the outbreak of the French Wars of Religion. Fighting for the French crown, he soon gained a reputation as a brutal but effective commander, winning the critical Battle of Vergt in 1562. He was badly injured in July 1570 and dismissed for alleged corruption soon after, dying at home in Estillac on 24 July 1577.

== Life and background ==
Blaise de Monluc was born between 1500 and 1502 in Saint-Puy, eldest son of François de Lasseran-Massencômes, seigneur de Monluc, who held lands in different parts of Gascony, and his first wife, Françoise de Mondenard, Dame d'Estillac, from whom he inherited the family chateau. Suggestions the Lasseran-Massencômes were a cadet branch of the more significant Montesquiou family are disputed.

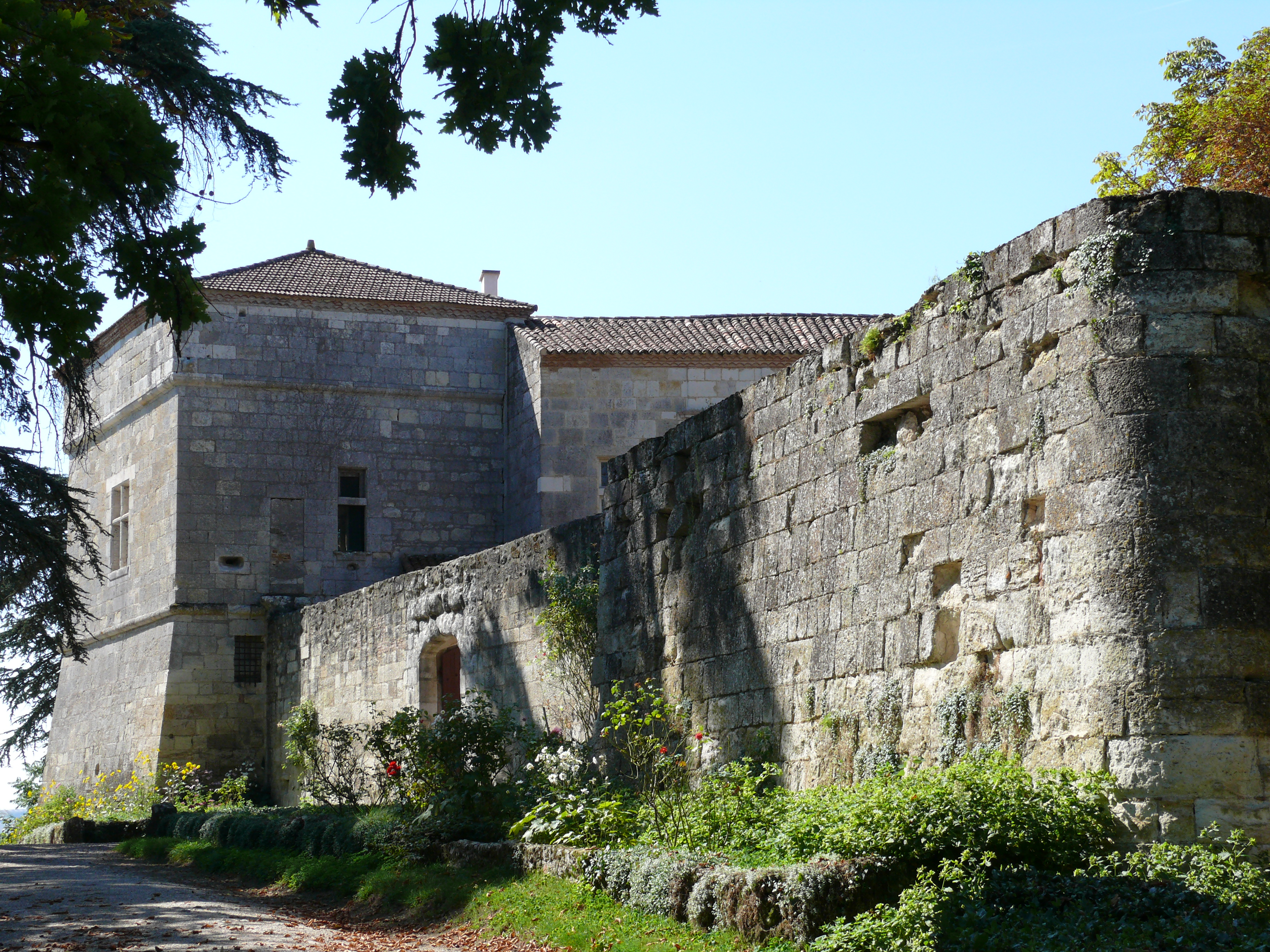
"Château de Monluc", in Estillac, which Montluc inherited from his mother

His younger full brother Jean de Monluc (1508–1579) became a diplomat and subsequently Bishop of Valence; despite his clerical status, he had a natural son, Jean de Monluc de Balagny (1545–1603), who was legitimised in 1563 and became Marshal of France in 1594. Their father's second marriage produced another five half-sisters and five half-brothers, of whom few details survive. One daughter Anne married François de Gélas and their younger son Charles later succeeded his uncle Jean as Bishop of Valence in 1574, while Joachim was another soldier whose pillaging of the Dordogne in 1537 was still remembered three centuries later.

Monluc also married twice, the first time to Antoinette Ysalguier (1505–1562), daughter of the Baron de Clermont. They had three daughters, Françoise, Marguerite and Marie, along with four sons, all of whom became soldiers. Three of the four died on active service; the eldest, Marc-Antoine, at Ostia in November 1557, the second, Pierre-Bertrand (1539–1566), on an expedition to Madeira, while Fabian, the youngest, died in a skirmish outside Nogaro in June 1573. His third son Jean (1548–1581) retired after being badly wounded in 1569 and was appointed Bishop of Condom in 1570. Monluc's second marriage to Isabeau de Beauville produced another three daughters, Charlotte-Catherine, Suzanne and Jeanne.

== Career ==
=== Italian Wars ===
As was then common for the sons of gentry, in 1512 Monluc entered the service of Antoine, Duke of Lorraine as a page, before joining the ducal army at the age of 14. He later claimed to have served under Bayard in Italy but the dates and his age make this unlikely. At the beginning of the Four Years War in 1521, he enlisted as an archer in a company raised by Lescun, a distant relative. After four years of minor skirmishes, he was captured at Pavia in 1525; a decisive French defeat, he was too poor to be worth a ransom and released. During the War of the League of Cognac, he fought in Southern Italy under Lautrec, and was badly wounded at the unsuccessful Siege of Naples in 1528.

Monluc returned home and spent the next three years serving Henry II of Navarre, before joining the "Legion de Languedoc" in 1534, part of an attempt by Francis I to create a national army. In the Italian War of 1536–1538, the latest episode of the long-running conflict between Francis and Emperor Charles V, he helped defend Marseille when Imperial troops invaded Provence in 1536. He spent the next five years on garrison duty in Piedmont and when the war started again in 1542 took part in the unsuccessful attack on Perpignan, then part of Spain. In his "Memoires", Monluc claimed it failed because his advice was ignored.

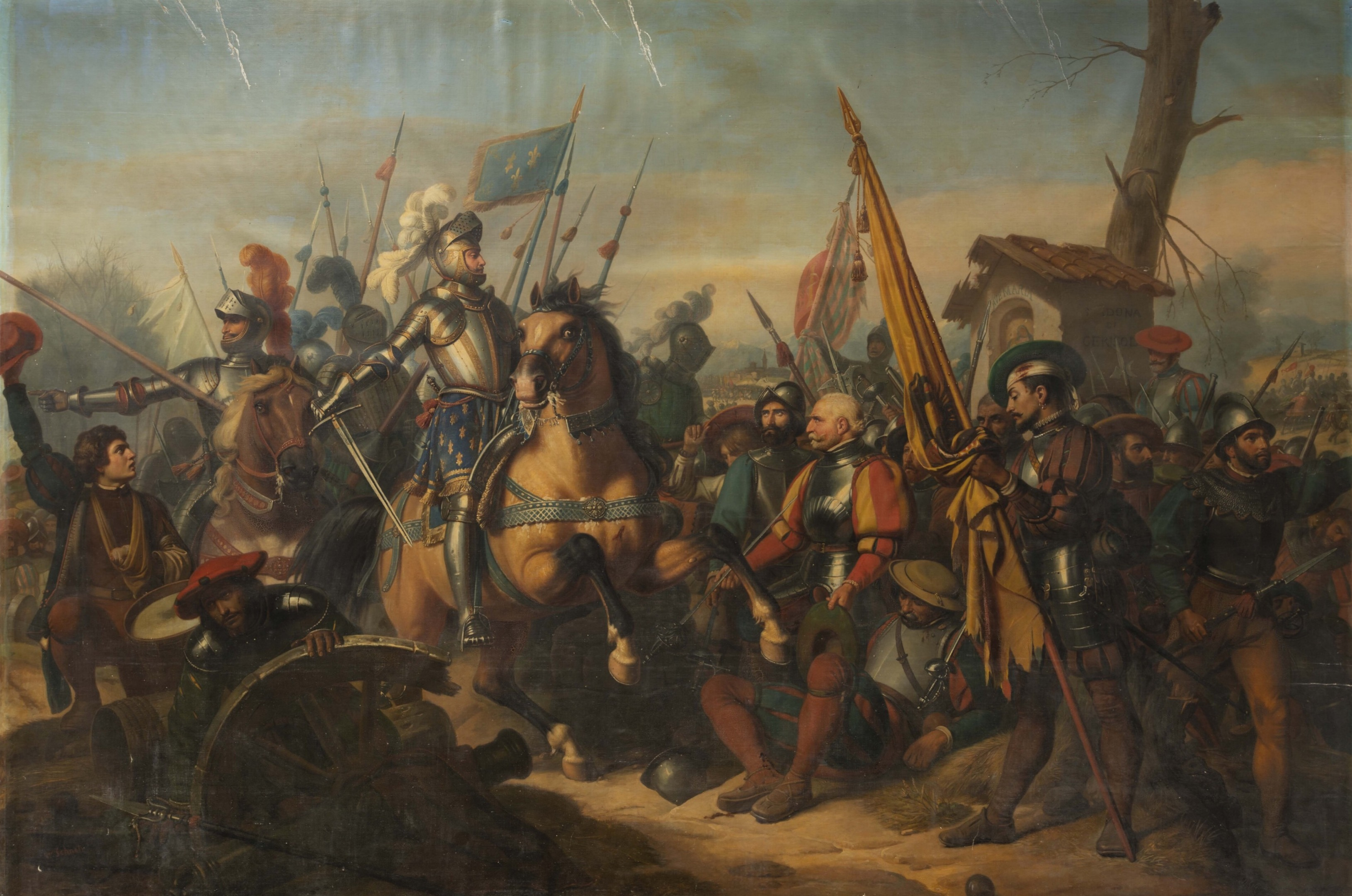
Francis, Count of Enghien, celebrates his victory at Ceresole, April 1544; Montluc served as his advisor

At the French victory of Ceresole in April 1544, Monluc commanded a unit of French infantry and acted as advisor to the inexperienced Francis, Count of Enghien. During 1545, he served under the future Henry II of France in an attempt to recapture Boulogne from Henry VIII of England and was promoted colonel by the Dauphin, then returned home to Gascony in December before the war ended with the June 1546 Treaty of Ardres. Francis died in March 1547 and was succeeded by his son Henry, who appointed Montluc governor of Moncalieri in 1548.

In July 1550, he transferred into the service of Brissac, newly appointed French governor of Piedmont, and during the Italian War of 1551–1559 led a vigorous defence of Siena which surrendered in May 1555 after a siege lasting over a year. Monluc moved to the nearby town of Montalcino and remained in Italy until May 1558 when he returned to Flanders and took part in the capture of Thionville; he was promoted to colonel-général of infantry and became a client of the powerful House of Guise. When the Italian Wars ended in April 1559 with the Treaty of Cateau-Cambrésis, Monluc was a well connected and respected military figure, while his brother Jean was a prominent diplomat and close to the Queen Mother, Catherine de' Medici. One reason for signing the treaty was the growth of Protestantism in France, which had exacerbated existing regional differences and factional splits within the nobility. By the 1550s, these tensions had brought France to the verge of civil war.

=== French Wars of Religion ===
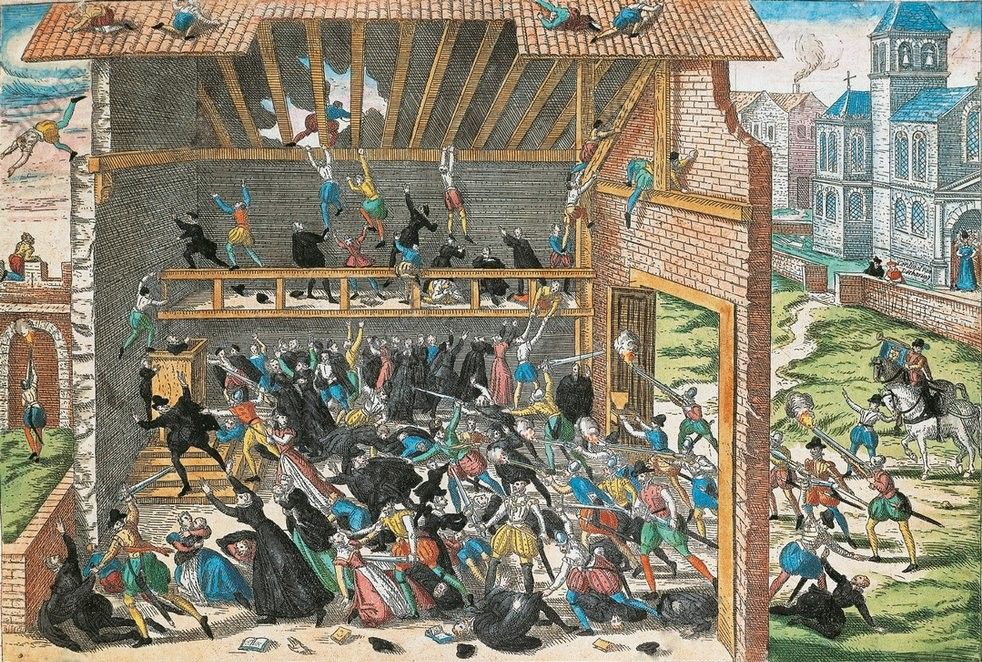
Massacre of Vassy, 1 March 1562, which sparked the French Wars of Religion

Henry died in July 1559 at a tournament held to celebrate the peace and was succeeded by his 16-year-old son Francis II, who was dominated by Monluc's patron, the Duke of Guise. (Note: Francis was married to Mary, Queen of Scots, daughter of the Duke's sister, Mary of Guise) His death in December 1560 brought his ten-year-old brother Charles IX of France to the throne and initiated a struggle for power between Protestants, commonly known as Huguenots, moderate Catholics led by the Queen Mother who favoured compromise, and a more extreme faction headed by the Guise family. In January 1562, Monluc was appointed Lieutenant-General of Guyenne, charged with restoring Royal authority in the province, and two months later the massacre of Vassy led to the outbreak of the French Wars of Religion.

Despite being a Catholic bishop, his brother Jean de Monluc was a friend of Calvinist theologian Theodore Beza and a Protestant sympathiser who supported Huguenot leader Condé in his request for freedom of worship. (Note: In 1566, Jean de Monluc was accused of heresy by Pope Pius V and suspended from the church but reinstated by the Queen Mother) Many of Monluc's Gascon neighbours were Protestant converts but he ultimately rejected the religion. In his "Memoires", he claimed he did so because its emphasis on freedom of conscience over obedience to Royal authority made Protestantism inherently seditious, but he may also have decided his interests were better served by remaining loyal to Francis, Duke of Guise.

By his own admission, Monluc conducted operations with great brutality, later claiming cruelty was an essential part of warfare. In the early stages of the war, he executed hundreds of Protestants, including the garrisons of Montségur and Terraube, and expressed regret lack of money forced him to ransom captured officers, rather than kill them. (Note: "Had the King paid his companies I should not have suffered ransom to have been in use in this quarrel. It is not...as in a foreign war where men fight for love and honour. In a civil war we must either be master or man, being we live as it were, all under a roof.") His victory at Vergt in October 1562 prevented Huguenot forces in southern France from reinforcing their colleagues north of the Loire.

The first stage of the civil war ended with the March 1563 Edict of Amboise, an agreement arguably made possible by the assassination of Monluc's patron Guise outside Orléans on 24 February. Although the Edict banned political or religious agitation, this provision proved impossible to enforce; the Guise faction felt it made too many concessions and Monluc was one of several military governors who set up Catholic action groups known as "Confraternities of the Holy Ghost". The four years after 1563 have been described as one of "armed peace" and Monluc focused on preparing for the resumption of hostilities, although he was replaced as Governor of Guyenne shortly before fighting began in September 1567.

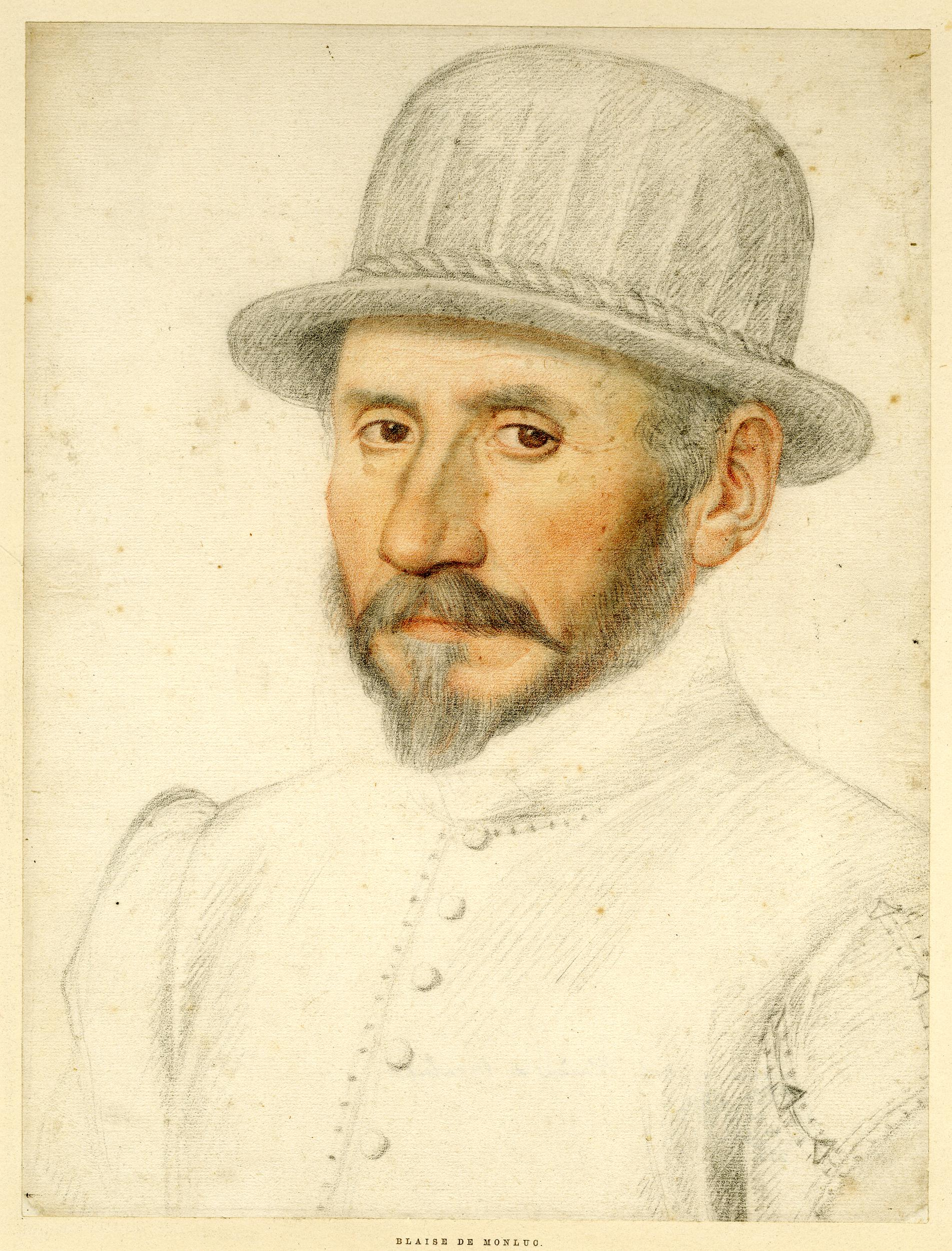
Blaise de Monluc, 17th century drawing

The Second French War of Religion ended with the March 1568 Peace of Longjumeau before a third round of the conflict broke out in September after the Edict of Saint-Maur revoked official tolerance for Protestants. Soon after, Monluc fell out with the Parlement de Bordeaux over a senior Protestant prisoner, the Marquis de la Roche-Chalais; despite a royal order requiring him to exchange the marquis for two Bordelais councillors held by the Huguenots, Montluc insisted Parlement pay him a ransom of 10,000 livres before he would do so. He then poisoned their relationship further by rejecting requests for help in defending Bordeaux, arguing his troops were needed elsewhere.

Monluc spent most of the Third French War of Religion campaigning on his own in South-West France, a period he later admitted was used to enrich himself. While attacking the Protestant-held town of Rabastens on 23 July 1570, he was shot in the face by an arquebus, losing his nose and most of one cheek and forcing him to wear a mask for the rest of his life. (Note: In retaliation, Monluc had all the prisoners thrown from the town walls.) On 8 August, the Peace of Saint-Germain-en-Laye ended the war.

His wound, combined with accusations of corruption by the Bordeaux Parlement and opponents like François de Montmorency, (Note: The House of Montmorency were political rivals of the Guise family and their supporters, so François sided with Bordeaux in their dispute with Monluc.) led to his removal from office. The next few years were spent compiling his Commentaires de Messire Blaise de Monluc and in 1574 he was partially rehabilitated when Henry III of France made him a Marshal of France. He was deeply embittered by his injuries, later writing; "Would to heaven this accursed engine [the arquebus] had never been invented, I had not then received those wounds which I now languish under, neither had so many valiant men been slain ...by the most pitiful fellows and the greatest cowards..." (Note: This seems to have been an outburst born of anger and depression; elsewhere in his Commentaires Monluc discusses the best way to employ arquebusiers and clearly views them as an essential part of modern warfare.) He died at his home in Estillac on 24 July 1577.

== Works ==
Monluc's literary fame derives from his Commentaires de Messire Blaise de Monluc, written between 1570 and 1576 and published after his death in 1592, which describes his fifty years of service from 1521 to 1570. Originally written to defend his reputation against accusations of corruption, it gradually expanded into a combined autobiography and military instruction manual. In addition to his experiences in France and Italy, it contains advice on tactics, strategy, building fortifications and leadership, recommendations such as paying pensions to wounded or crippled soldiers and avoiding reliance on foreign mercenaries, as well as observations on topics like the best way to educate the nobility.

Called the "soldier's Bible" by Henry of Navarre, it is one of many similar memoirs from this period, among them works by Beza, Tavannes and Jacques Auguste de Thou. Divided into seven volumes, the first four relate to the campaigns in Italy, ranging from the early 1530s to the French recovery of Thionville in 1558; the final three deal with his appointment as lieutenant du roi in Guyenne and his efforts to re-establish Royal authority. His autobiography is "an important source of evidence for these events, an eye-witness account of troubled times". Although his memory of places was more accurate than dates and his Commentaires were extensively edited over time to place him in a more favourable light, overall they are "full of life and movement" while Montluc displays "a natural gift for clear and expressive speech".

== Sources ==
- Carroll, Stuart (2009). Martyrs and Murderers: The Guise Family and the Making of Europe. Oxford University Press. ISBN 978-0199229079.
- Courteault, Paul (1908). Blaise de Montluc; Historien (in French). Bibliothèque Méridionale.
- Degert, Antoine (July 1904). "Procès de huit évêques français suspects de Calvinisme". Revue des questions historiques (in French). 32 (86): 61–108.
- Forneron, H (1876). "Note sur la bataille de Vergt 15 Octobre 1562". Bulletin de la Société historique et archéologique du Périgord (in French). 3.
- Gaffarel, Paul (1879). "Le Capitaine Peyrot Monluc". Revue Historique (in French). 9 (2): 273–332. JSTOR 40935833.
- Gould, Kevin Dr (2013). "The Commentaires de Blaise de Montluc in the Historiography of the French Wars of Religion". Nottingham Trent University.
- Hauterive, Borel d' (1841). Revue historique de la noblesse, volume 2 (in French).
- Holmes, Richard (1988). World Atlas of Warfare: Military Innovations that changed the course of history. Viking. ISBN 978-0670819676.
- Holt, Mack (2005). The French Wars of Religion, 1562–1629. Cambridge University Press. ISBN 978-0521547505.
- Holt, Mack (2020). The Politics of Wine in Early Modern France. Cambridge University Press. ISBN 978-1108456814.
- Hook, Judith (1973). "The Fall of Siena". History Today. 23 (2).
- Joliblois, Emile (1872). Dévastation de Albigeois par les companies de Montluc, 1537 (PDF) (in French). Ernest Desrue.
- Knecht, Robert (1994). Renaissance Warrior and Patron: The Reign of Francis I. CUP. ISBN 978-0521417969.
- Knecht, Robert (1995). "The sword and the pen: Blaise de Monluc and his "Commentaires"". Renaissance Studies. 9 (1): 104–118. doi:10.1111/j.1477-4658.1995.tb00303.x. JSTOR 24412373.
- Knecht, Robert J (1996). The French Wars of Religion 1559–1598. Longman. ISBN 058228533X.
- Roberts, Penny (2013). Peace and Authority during the French Religious Wars c. 1560-1600. Palgrave Macmillan. ISBN 978-1137326744.
- Salmon, J.H.M (1979). Society in Crisis: France in the Sixteenth Century. Cambridge University Press. ISBN 0416730507.
- Thompson, James (1909). The Wars of Religion in France 1559–1576: The Huguenots, Catherine de Medici and Phillip II. Chicago University Press.
