= French Resistance =

French rebel groups that fought Nazi Germany in World War II

- Part of resistance during World War II and anti-fascism
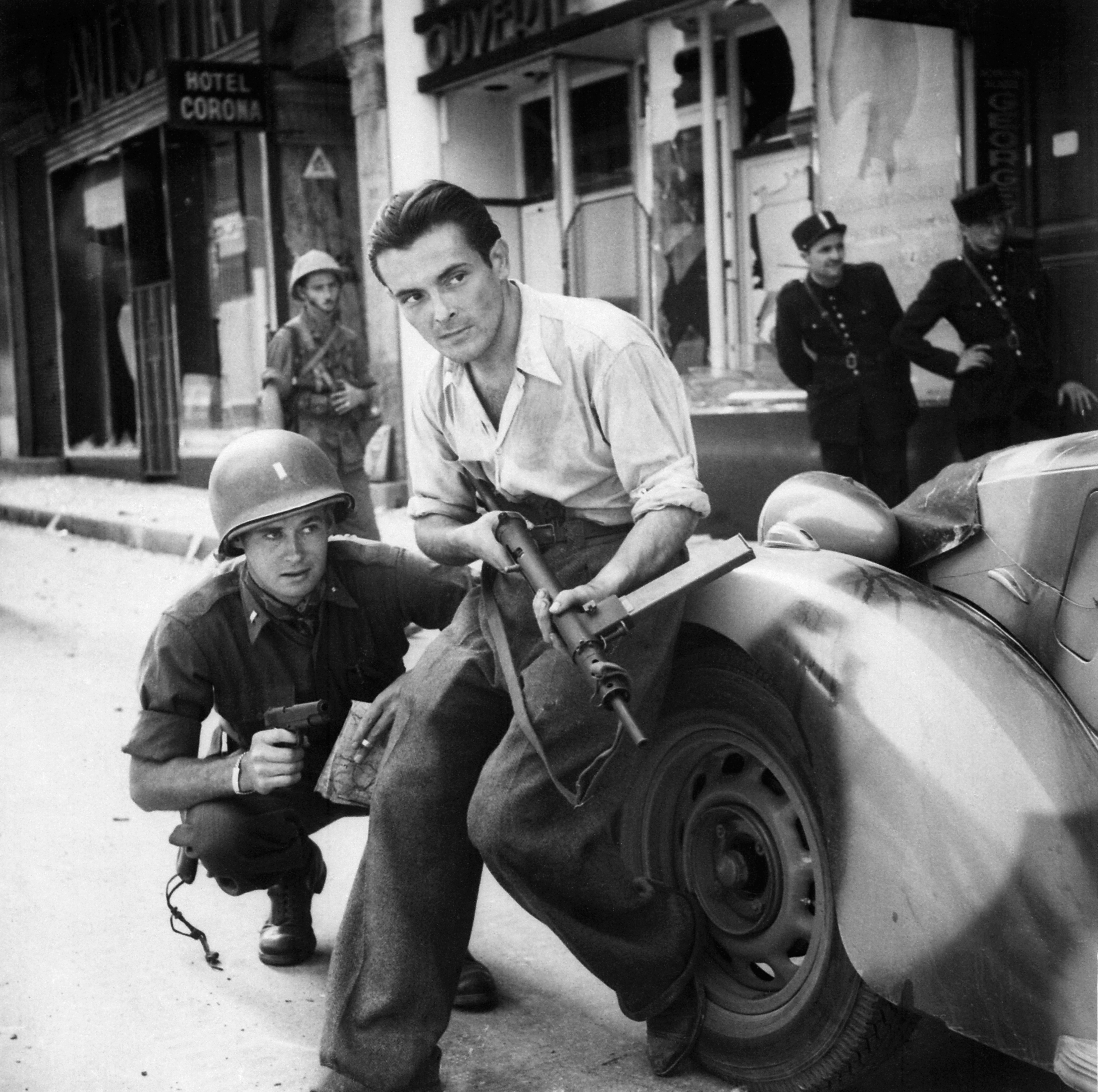
- American officer and French partisan crouch behind an auto during a street fight in a French city, 1944
Date	June 1940 – October 1944
Location	Occupied France
Result	French victory: Liberation of France; German withdrawal from France

Belligerents
Germany; Supported by: Vichy France	(Free France) Resistance groups; (formalised as French Forces of the Interior after June 1944); Supported by: United Kingdom; United States

Commanders and leaders
(Nazi Germany) Otto von Stülpnagel (Nazi Germany) C.H. von Stülpnagel (Nazi Germany) Carl Oberg (Vichy France) Joseph Darnand (Vichy France) René Bousquet	(Free France) Jean Moulin (executed) (Free France) Georges Bidault (Free France) Louis Saillant (Free France) Marie-Pierre Kœnig

Units involved
(Nazi Germany) Wehrmacht Heer; (Nazi Germany) Waffen-SS; (Nazi Germany) Geheime Feldpolizei; (Nazi Germany) Gestapo; (Vichy France) Milice; • Franc-Garde; (Vichy France) GMR	(Free France) BCRA; (Free France) CNR; (Free France) FTPF; (Free France) Brutus Network; (Free France) Dutch-Paris; (Free France) Maquis

The Cross of Lorraine, chosen by General Charles de Gaulle as the symbol of the Resistance

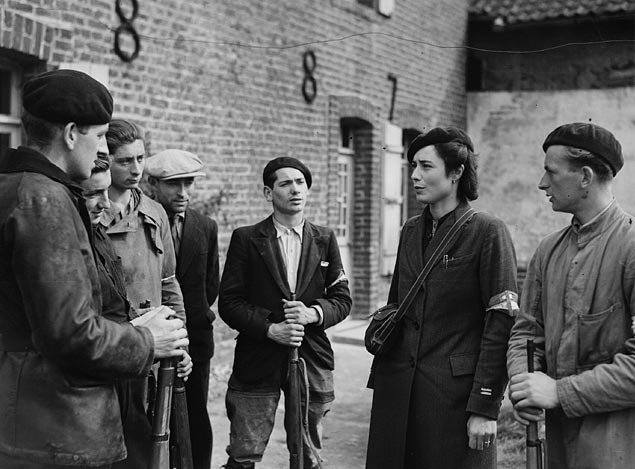
Members of the Maquis near Boulogne-sur-Mer in September 1944

The French Resistance (French: La Résistance [la ʁezistɑ̃s]) was a resistance movement made of a collection of different revolutionary groups that fought the Nazi occupation and the collaborationist Vichy regime in France during the Second World War. Resistance cells were small groups of armed men and women (called the Maquis in rural areas) who conducted guerrilla warfare and published underground newspapers. They also provided first-hand intelligence information, and escape networks that helped Allied soldiers and airmen trapped behind Axis lines. The Resistance's men and women came from many parts of French society, including émigrés, academics, students, aristocrats, conservative Roman Catholics (including clergy), Protestants, Jews, Muslims, liberals, anarchists, communists, and some fascists. The proportion of the French people who participated in organized resistance has been estimated at from one to three percent of the total population.

The French Resistance played a significant role in facilitating the Allies' rapid advance through France following the landings in Normandy on 6 June 1944. Members provided military intelligence on German defences known as the Atlantic Wall, and on Wehrmacht deployments and orders of battle for the Allied landings in Provence on 15 August. The Resistance also planned, coordinated, and executed sabotage acts on electrical power grids, transport facilities, and telecommunications networks. The Resistance's work was politically and morally important to France during and after the German occupation. The actions of the Resistance contrasted with the collaborationism of the Vichy régime.

After the Allied landings in Normandy and Provence, the paramilitary components of the Resistance formed a hierarchy of operational units known as the French Forces of the Interior (FFI) with around 100,000 fighters in June 1944. By October 1944, the FFI had grown to 400,000 members. Although the amalgamation of the FFI was sometimes fraught with political difficulties, it was ultimately successful and allowed France to rebuild the fourth-largest army in the European theatre (1.2 million men) by VE Day in May 1945.

== Nazi occupation ==
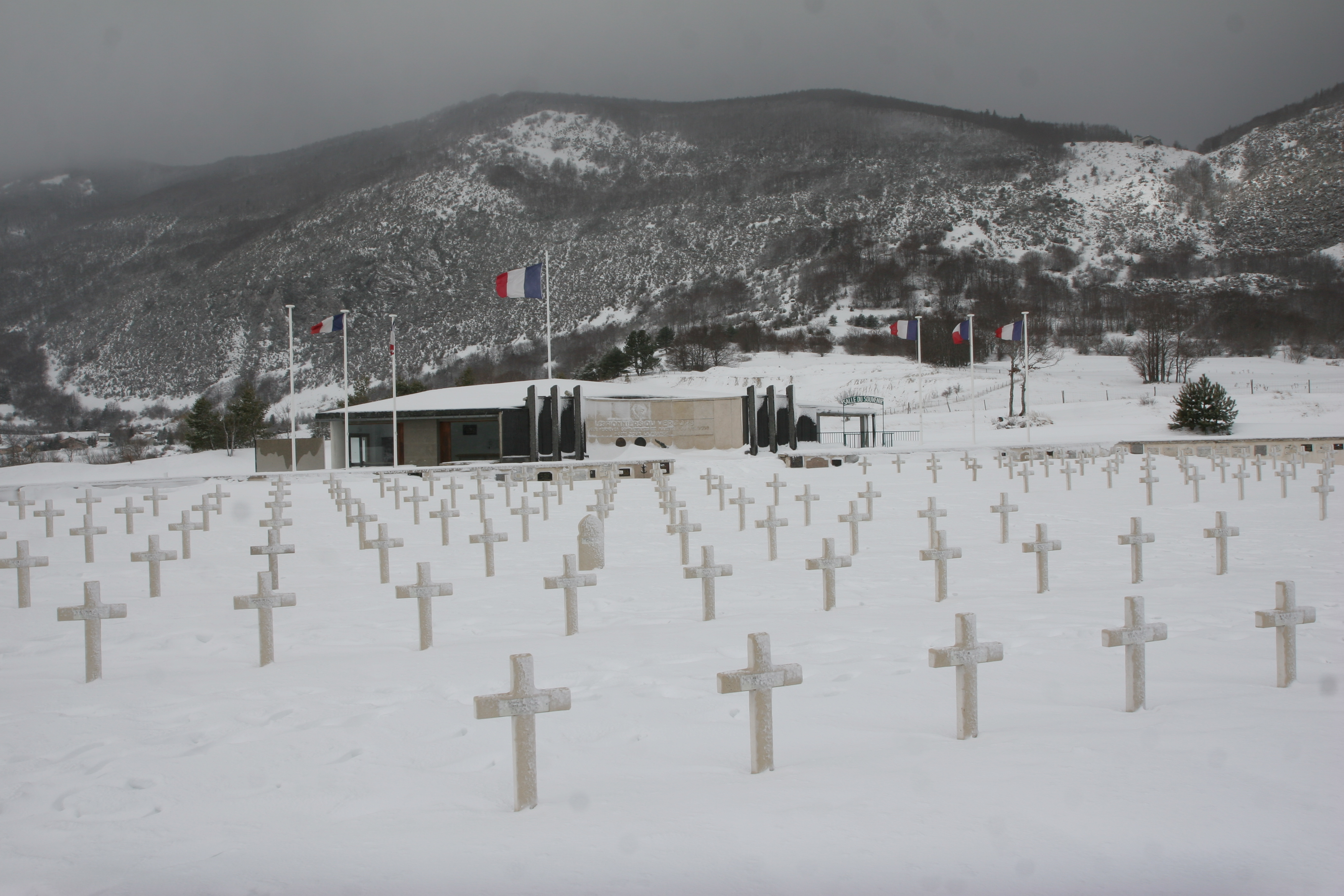
The cemetery and memorial in Vassieux-en-Vercors where, in July 1944, German Wehrmacht forces executed more than 200 people, in reprisal for the Maquis's armed resistance. The town was later awarded the Ordre de la Libération.

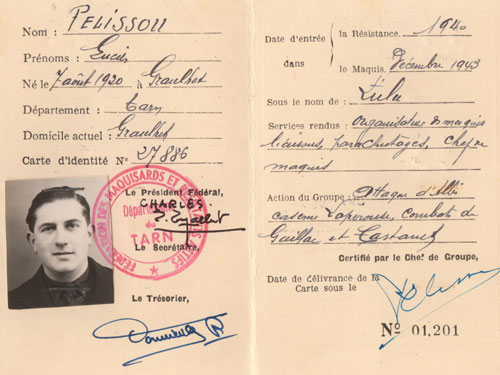
Identity document of French Resistance fighter Lucien Pélissou

After the Battle of France and the second French-German armistice, the lives of the French continued unchanged at first. However the German occupation authorities and the Vichy régime became increasingly brutal and intimidating. Most civilians remained neutral, but both the occupation of French territory and German policy inspired the formation of paramilitary groups dedicated to both active and passive resistance.

One of the conditions of the armistice was that the French must pay for their own occupation. This amounted to about 20 million German Reichsmarks per day, a sum that, in May 1940, was approximately equivalent to four hundred million French francs. The artificial exchange rate of the Reichsmark versus the franc had been established as one mark to twenty francs. Due to the overvaluation of German currency, the occupiers were able to make seemingly fair and honest requisitions and purchases while operating a system of organized plunder. Prices soared, leading to widespread food shortages and malnutrition, particularly among children, the elderly, and members of the working class engaged in physical labour. Labour shortages also plagued the French economy because hundreds of thousands of French workers were requisitioned and transferred to Germany for compulsory labour under the Service du travail obligatoire (STO).

The labour shortage was worsened by the large number of French prisoners of war held in Germany. Beyond these hardships and dislocations, the occupation became increasingly unbearable. Regulations, censorship, propaganda and nightly curfews all played a role in establishing an atmosphere of fear and repression. French women consorting with German soldiers angered many French men, though often the women had to do so to acquire food for themselves and their families.

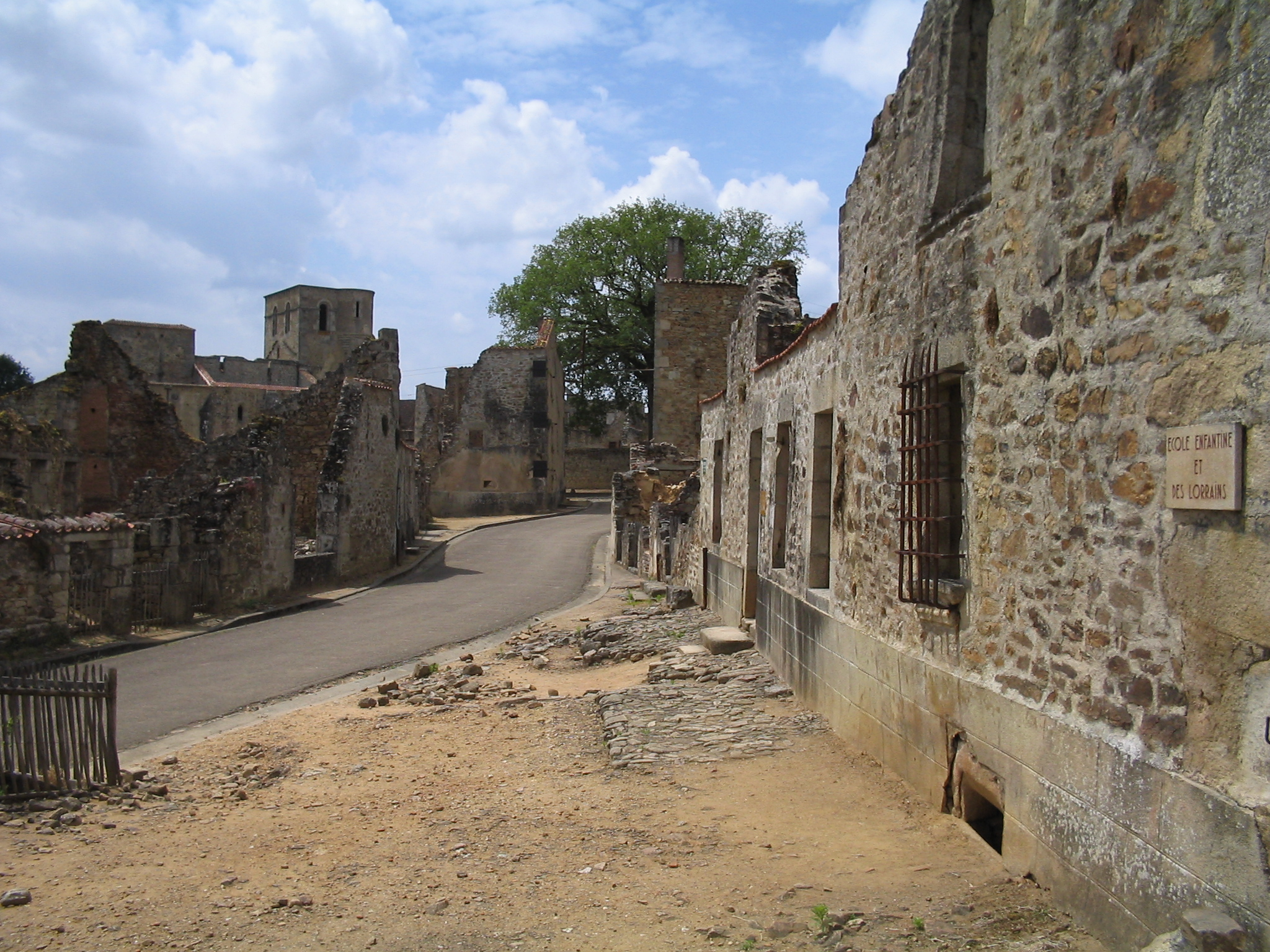
The ruins of Oradour-sur-Glane, in the Limousin region of the Massif Central

As reprisals for Resistance activities, the authorities established harsh forms of collective punishment. For example, the Soviet resistance in August 1941 led to thousands of hostages taken from the population. A typical policy statement read, "After each further incident, a number, reflecting the seriousness of the crime, shall be shot." During the occupation, an estimated 30,000 French civilian hostages were shot to intimidate others who were involved in acts of resistance. German troops occasionally engaged in massacres such as the Oradour-sur-Glane massacre, in which an entire village was razed and almost every resident murdered because of persistent resistance in the vicinity.

In early 1943, the Vichy authorities created a paramilitary group, the Milice (militia), officially led by Pierre Laval, but operated by Joseph Darnand to combat the Resistance. This group worked alongside German forces that, by the end of 1942, were stationed throughout France. The group collaborated closely with the Nazis, similar to the Gestapo security forces in Germany. Their actions were often brutal and included torture and execution of Resistance suspects. After the liberation of France in the summer of 1944, the French executed many of the estimated 25,000 to 35,000 miliciens for their collaboration with the Nazis. Many of those who escaped arrest fled to Germany, where they were incorporated into the Charlemagne Division of the Waffen SS.

== History ==
=== 1940: Early stages ===
The Occupation was hard for the French to accept. Many Parisians remember the shock at seeing swastika flags hanging over the Hôtel de Ville and on top of the Eiffel Tower. At the Palais-Bourbon, where the National Assembly building was converted into the office of the Kommandant von Gross-Paris, a huge banner was spread across the facade of the building reading in capital letters: "DEUTSCHLAND SIEGT AN ALLEN FRONTEN!" ("Germany is victorious on all fronts!"), a sign that is mentioned by virtually all accounts by Parisians at the time. The résistant Henri Frenay wrote that seeing the tricolour flag disappear from Paris—replaced by the swastika and German soldiers guarding former republican institutions—gave him un sentiment de viol (a feeling of rape). The British historian Ian Ousby wrote:

Even today, when people who are not French or did not live through the Occupation look at photos of German soldiers marching down the Champs Élysées or of Gothic-lettered German signposts outside the great landmarks of Paris, they can still feel a slight shock of disbelief. The scenes look not just unreal, but almost deliberately surreal, as if the unexpected conjunction of German and French, French and German, was the result of a Dada prank and not the sober record of history. This shock is merely a distant echo of what the French underwent in 1940: seeing a familiar landscape transformed by the addition of the unfamiliar, living among everyday sights suddenly made bizarre, no longer feeling at home in places they had known all their lives."

Ousby wrote that by the end of summer of 1940 "the alien presence, increasingly hated and feared in private, could seem so permanent that, in the public places where daily life went on, it was taken for granted". At the same time, buildings were renamed, books were banned, art was stolen and transferred to Germany, and people started to disappear. Under the armistice of June 1940, the French were obliged to arrest and deport to the Reich those Germans and Austrians who fled to France in the 1930s.

Resistance when it first began in the summer of 1940 was based upon what the writer Jean Cassou called refus absurde ("absurd refusal") of refusing to accept that the Reich would win and even if it did, it was better to resist. Many résistants often spoke of some "climax" when they saw some intolerable act of injustice, after which they could no longer remain passive. The résistant Joseph Barthelet told the British SOE agent George Miller that he made up his mind to join the resistance when he saw German military police march a group of Frenchmen, one of whom was a friend, into the Feldgendarmerie in Metz. Barthelt recalled: "I recognized him only by his hat... I saw his face all right, but there was no skin on it, and he could not see me. Both his poor eyes had been closed into two purple and yellow bruises". The right-wing résistant Henri Frenay who had initially sympathized with the Révolution nationale stated that when he saw German soldiers in Paris in the summer of 1940, he knew he had to do something because of the look of contempt he saw on the faces of the Germans when viewing the French. In the beginning, resistance was limited to severing phone lines, vandalizing posters and slashing tyres on German vehicles. Another tactic was the publication of underground newspapers like Musée de l'Homme (Museum of Mankind). This paper was established by two professors, Paul Rivet and the Russian émigré Boris Vildé in July 1940. Jean Cassou also organized a resistance group in Paris that month and a liberal Catholic law professor François de Menthon founded the group Liberté in Lyon.

On 19 July 1940 the Special Operations Executive (SOE) was established in Britain with orders from Churchill to "set Europe ablaze". The F Section of the SOE was headed by Maurice Buckmaster and provided invaluable support for the resistance. From May 1941, Frenay founded Combat, one of the first Resistance groups. Frenay recruited for Combat by asking people such questions as whether they believed that Britain would not be defeated and if they thought a German victory was worth stopping, and based on the answers he would ask: "Men are already gathering in the shadows. Will you join them?". Frenay, one of the leading resistance chefs, later wrote: "I myself never attacked a den of collaborators or derailed trains. I never killed a German or a Gestapo agent with my own hand". For security reasons, Combat was divided into a series of cells that were unaware of each other. Another early resistance group founded in the summer of 1940 was the ill-fated Interallié group led by a Polish émigré Roman Czerniawski that passed on intelligence from contacts in the Deuxième Bureau to Britain via couriers from Marseille. A member of the group, Frenchwoman Mathilde Carré codenamed La Chatte (the cat), was later arrested by the Germans and betrayed the group.

The French intelligence service, the Deuxième Bureau stayed loyal to the Allied cause despite nominally being under the authority of Vichy; the Deuxième Bureau continued to collect intelligence on Germany, maintained links with British and Polish intelligence and kept the secret that before World War II Polish intelligence had devised a method via a mechanical computer known as the Bombe to break the Enigma machine that was used to code German radio messages. A number of the Polish code-breakers who developed the Bombe machine in the 1930s continued to work for the Deuxième Bureau as part of the Cadix team breaking German codes. In the summer of 1940, many cheminots (railroad workers) engaged in impromptu resistance by helping French soldiers wishing to continue the struggle together with British, Belgian and Polish soldiers stranded in France escape from the occupied zone into the unoccupied zone or Spain. Cheminots also became the main agents for delivering underground newspapers across France.

The first résistant executed by the Germans was a Polish Jewish immigrant named Israël Carp, shot in Bordeaux on 28 August 1940 for jeering a German military parade down the streets of Bordeaux. The first Frenchman shot for resistance was 19 year-old Pierre Roche, on 7 September 1940 after he was caught cutting the phone lines between Royan and La Rochelle. On 10 September 1940, the military governor of France, General Otto von Stülpnagel announced in a press statement that no mercy would be granted to those engaging in sabotage and all saboteurs would be shot. Despite his warning, more continued to engage in sabotage. Louis Lallier, a farmer, was shot for sabotage on 11 September in Épinal, and Marcel Rossier, a mechanic, was shot in Rennes on 12 September. One more was shot in October 1940, and three more in November 1940.

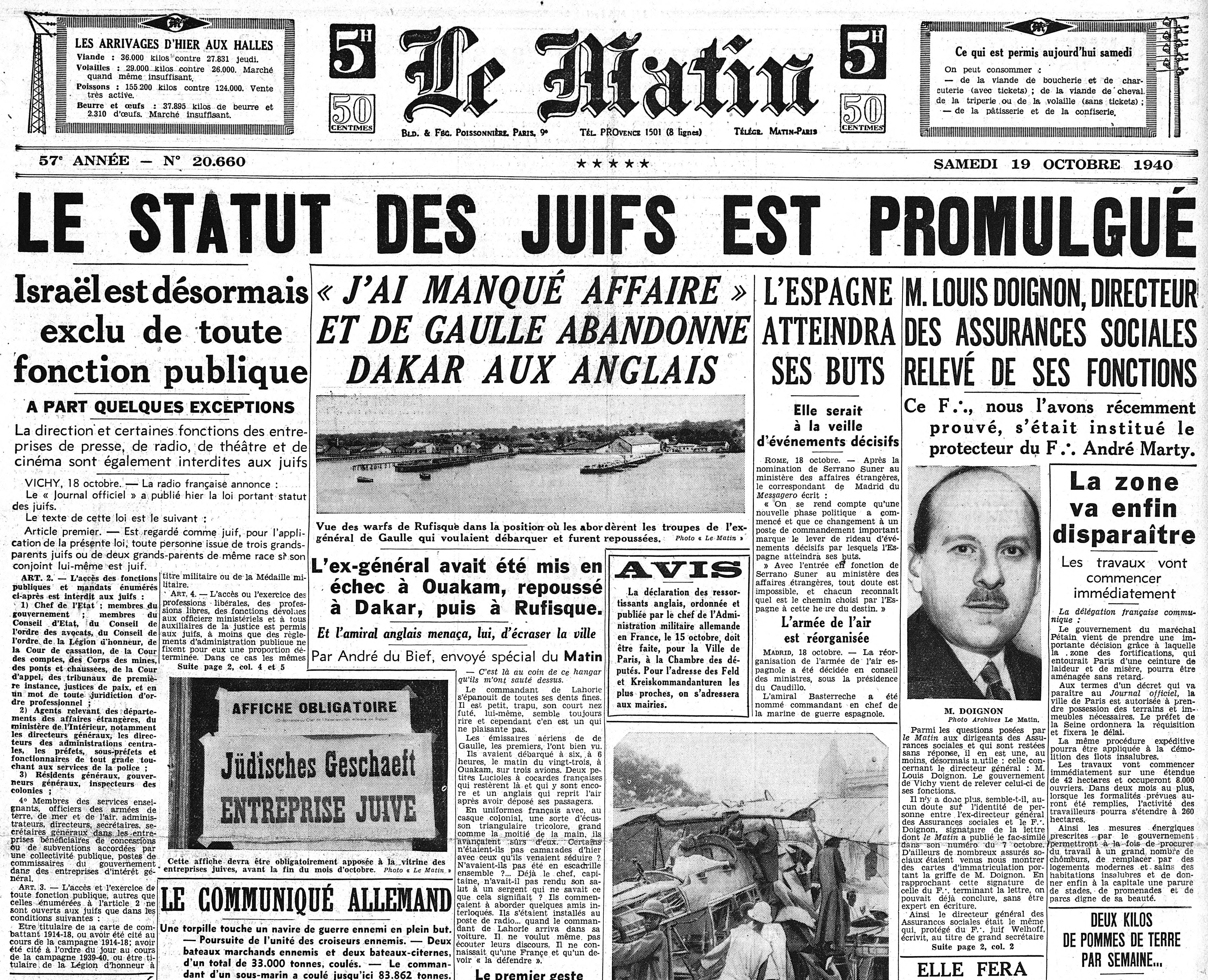
Antisemitic laws proclaimed in 1940

Starting in the summer of 1940 anti-Semitic laws started to come into force in both the occupied and unoccupied zones. On 3 October 1940 Vichy introduced the law on the status of Jews, banning Jews from numerous professions including law, medicine and public service. Jewish businesses were "Aryanized" by being placed in the hands of "Aryan" trustees who engaged in blatant corruption. Jews were banned from cinemas, music halls, fairs, museums, libraries, public parks, cafes, theatres, concerts, restaurants, swimming pools and markets. Jews could not move without informing the police first, own radios or bicycles, were denied phone service, could not use phone booths marked Accès interdit aux Juifs and were only allowed to ride the last carriage on the Paris Metro. The French people at the time distinguished between Israélites (a polite term in French) who were "properly" assimilated French Jews and the Juifs (formerly a derogatory term in French, nowadays the standard name for Jewish people) who were the "foreign" and "unassimilated" Jews who were widely seen as criminals from abroad living in slums in the inner cities of France. All through the 1930s, the number of illegal Jewish immigrants from Eastern Europe was vastly exaggerated. The French public was persuaded that the majority of Jews living in France were illegal immigrants causing social problems. When the first anti-Semitic laws were introduced in 1940: "There was no sign of public opposition to what was happening, or even widespread unease at the direction in which events were heading ... Many people, perhaps even most people, were indifferent. In the autumn of 1940 they had other things to think about; later they could find little room for fellow-feeling or concern for the public good in their own struggle to survive. What happened to the Jews was a secondary matter; it was beyond their immediate affairs, it belonged to that realm of the 'political' which they could no longer control or even bring themselves to follow with much interest".

From the beginning, the Resistance attracted people from all walks of life and with diverse political views. A major problem for the Resistance was that, with the exception of a number of Army officers who chose to go underground together with veterans of the Spanish Civil War, nobody had any military experience. About 60,000 Spanish Republican exiles fought in the Resistance. A further difficulty was the shortage of weapons, which explained why early resistance groups founded in 1940 focused on publishing journals and underground newspapers as the lack of guns and ammunition made armed resistance almost impossible. Although officially adhering to the Comintern instructions not to criticise Germany because of the Soviet non-aggression pact with Hitler, in October 1940 the French Communists founded the Special Organisation (OS), composed with many veterans from the Spanish Civil War, which carried out a number of minor attacks before Hitler broke the treaty and invaded Russia.

Life in the Resistance was highly dangerous and it was imperative for good "resistants" to live quietly and never attract attention to themselves. Punctuality was key to meetings in public as the Germans would arrest anyone who was seen hanging around in public as if waiting for someone. A major difficulty for the Resistance was the problem of denunciation. Contrary to popular belief, the Gestapo was not an omnipotent agency with its spies everywhere, but instead the Gestapo relied upon ordinary people to volunteer information. According to Abwehr officer Hermann Tickler, the Germans needed 32 000 indicateurs (informers) to crush all resistance in France, but he reported in the fall of 1940 that the Abwehr had already exceeded that target. It was difficult for Germans to pass themselves off as French, so the Abwehr, the Gestapo and the SS could not have functioned without French informers. In September 1940, the poet Robert Desnos published an article titled "J'irai le dire à la Kommandantur" in the underground newspaper Aujourd'hui appealing to ordinary French people to stop denouncing each other to the Germans. Desnos's appeal failed, but the phrase "J'irai le dire à la Kommandantur" ("I'll go and tell the Germans about it") was a very popular one in occupied France as hundreds of thousands of ordinary French people denounced one another to the Germans. The problem of informers, whom the French called indics or mouches, was compounded by the writers of poison pen letters or corbeaux. These corbeaux were inspired by motivations such as envy, spite, greed, anti-Semitism, and sheer opportunism, as many ordinary French people wanted to ingratiate themselves with what they believed to be the winning side. Ousby noted "Yet perhaps the most striking testimony to the extent of denunciation came from the Germans themselves, surprised at how ready the French were to betray each other". In occupied France, one had to carry at all times a huge cache of documents such as an ID card, a ration card, tobacco voucher (regardless if one was a smoker or not), travel permits, work permits, and so on. For these reasons, forgery became a key skill for the resistance as the Germans regularly required the French to produce their papers, and anyone whose papers seemed suspicious would be arrested.

The franc was devalued by 20% to the Reichsmark, and together with German policies of food requisition both to support their own army and the German home front, "France was slowly being bled dry by the outflow not just of meat and drink, fuel and leather, but of wax, frying pans, playing cards, axe handles, perfume and a host of other goods as well. Parisians, at least, had got the point as early as December 1940. When Hitler shipped back the Duc de Reichstadt's remains for a solemn burial in Les Invalides, people said they would have preferred coal rather than ashes." People could not legally buy items without a ration book with the population being divided into categories A, B, C, E, J, T and V; among the products rationed included meat, milk, butter, cheese, bread, sugar, eggs, oil, coffee, fish, wine, soap, tobacco, salt, potatoes and clothing. The black market flourished in occupied France with the gangsters from the milieu (underworld) of Paris and Marseille soon becoming very rich by supplying rationed goods. The milieu established smuggling networks bringing in rationed goods over the Pyrenées from Spain, and it was soon learned that for the right price, they were also willing to smuggle people out of France such as Allied airmen, refugees, Jews, and résistants. Later on in the war, they would smuggle in agents from the SOE. However, the milieu were only interested in making money, and would just as easily betray those who wanted to be smuggled in or out of France if the Germans or Vichy were willing to make a better offer.

On 10 November 1940, a jostle on the Rue de Havre in Paris broke out between some Parisians and German soldiers, which ended with a man raising his fist to a German sergeant, and a man named Jacques Bonsergent, who seems only to have been a witness to the quarrel, being arrested in unclear circumstances. On 11 November 1940, to mark the 22nd anniversary of the French victory of 1918, university students demonstrated in Paris, and were brutally put down by the Paris police. In December 1940, the Organisation civile et militaire (OCM), which consisted of army officers and civil servants, was founded to provide intelligence to the Allies.

On 5 December 1940, Bonsergent was convicted by a German military court of insulting the Wehrmacht. He insisted on taking full responsibility, saying he wanted to show the French what sort of people the Germans were, and he was shot on 23 December 1940. The execution of Bonsergent, a man guilty only of being a witness to an incident that was in itself only very trivial, brought home to many of the French the precise nature of the "New Order in Europe". All over Paris, posters warning that all who challenged the might of the Reich would be shot like Bonsergent were torn down or vandalized, despite the warnings from General von Stülpnagel that damaging the posters was an act of sabotage that would be punished by the death penalty; so many posters were torn down and/or vandalized that Stülpnagel had to post policemen to guard them. Writer Jean Bruller remembered being "transfixed" by reading about Bonsergent's fate and how "people stopped, read, wordlessly exchanged glances. Some of them bared their heads as if in the presence of the dead". On Christmas Day 1940, Parisians woke to find that in the previous night, the posters announcing Bonsergent's execution had been turned into shrines, being in Bruller's words "surrounded by flowers, like on so many tombs. Little flowers of every kind, mounted on pins, had been struck on the posters during the night—real flowers and artificial ones, paper pansies, celluloid roses, small French and British flags". The writer Simone de Beauvoir stated that it was not just Bonsergent that people mourned, but also the end of the illusion "as for the first time these correct people who occupied our country were officially telling us they had executed a Frenchman guilty of not bowing his head to them".

=== 1941: Armed resistance begins ===
On 31 December 1940, de Gaulle, speaking on the BBC's Radio Londres, asked that the French stay indoors on New Year's Day between 3 and 4:00 pm as a show of passive resistance. The Germans handed out potatoes at that hour in an attempt to bring people away from their radios.

In March 1941, the Calvinist pastor Marc Boegner condemned the Vichy statut des Juifs in a public letter, one of the first times that French antisemitism had been publicly condemned during the occupation. On 5 May 1941, the first SOE agent (Georges Bégué) landed in France to make contact with the resistance groups (Virginia Hall was the first female SOE agent arriving in August 1941). The SOE preferred to recruit French citizens living in Britain or who had fled to the United Kingdom, as they were able to blend in more effectively; British SOE agents were people who had lived in France for a long time and could speak French without an accent. Bégué suggested that the BBC's Radio Londres send personal messages to the Resistance. At 9:15 pm every night, the BBC's French language service broadcast the first four notes of Beethoven's Fifth Symphony (which sounded like the Morse code for V as in victory), followed by cryptic messages, which were codes for the "personal messages" to the resistance. By June 1941, the SOE had two radio stations operating in France. The SOE provided weapons, bombs, false papers, money and radios to the resistance, and the SOE agents were trained in guerrilla warfare, espionage and sabotage. One such SOE operative, American Virginia Hall, established the Heckler network in Lyon.

A major reason for young Frenchmen to become résistants was resentment of collaboration horizontale ("horizontal collaboration"), the euphemistic term for sexual relationships between German men and Frenchwomen. The devaluation of the franc and the German policy of requisitioning food created years of hardship for the French, so taking a German lover was a rational choice for many Frenchwomen. "Horizontal collaboration" was widespread, with 85,000 illegitimate children fathered by Germans born by October 1943. While this number isn't particularly high for the circumstances, many young Frenchmen disliked the fact that some Frenchwomen seemed to find German men more attractive than them and wanted to strike back.

In Britain, the letter V had been adopted as a symbol of the will to victory, and in the summer of 1941, the V cult crossed the English Channel. It appeared widely in chalk on the pavement, walls, and German military vehicles all over France. The V remained one of the main symbols of resistance for the rest of the Occupation, although Ousby has noted that the French had their own "revolutionary, republican, and nationalist traditions" to draw upon for symbols of resistance. Starting in 1941, it was common for crowds to sing La Marseillaise on traditional holidays like May Day, Bastille Day, 6 September (the anniversary of the Battle of the Marne in 1914) and Armistice Day with a special emphasis on the line: "Aux armes, citoyens!" (Citizens to arms!). The underground press created what Ousby called "the rhetoric of resistance to counter the rhetoric of the Reich and Vichy" to inspire people, using sayings from the great figures of French history. The underground newspaper Les Petites Ailes de France quoted Napoleon that "To live defeated is to die every day!"; Liberté quoted Foch saying that "A nation is beaten only when it has accepted that it is beaten" while Combat quoted Clemenceau: "In war as in peace, those who never give up have the last word". The two most popular figures invoked by the resistance were Clemenceau and Maréchal Foch, who insisted even during the darkest hours of World War I that France would never submit to the Reich and would fight on until victory, which made them inspiring figures to the résistants.

On 22 June 1941, Germany launched Operation Barbarossa and invaded the Soviet Union. Well prepared for the resistance through the clandestinity in which they were forced during the Daladier government, the Parti Communiste Français (PCF) began fighting German occupation forces in May 1941, i.e. before the Comintern appeal that followed the German attack on the Soviet Union. Nevertheless, communists had a more prominent role in the resistance only after June 1941. As the communists were used to operating in secret, were tightly disciplined, and had a number of veterans of the Spanish Civil War, they played a disproportionate role in the Resistance. The communist resistance group was the FTP (Francs-Tireurs et Partisans Français-French Snipers and Partisans) headed by Charles Tillon. Tillon later wrote that between June–December 1941 the RAF carried out 60 bombing attacks and 65 strafing attacks in France, which killed a number of French people, while the FTP, during the same period, set off 41 bombs, derailed 8 trains and carried out 107 acts of sabotage, which killed no French people. In the summer of 1941, a brochure appeared in France entitled Manuel du Légionnaire, which contained detailed notes on how to fire guns, manufacture bombs, sabotage factories, carry out assassinations, and perform other skills useful to the resistance. The brochure was disguised as informational material for fascistic Frenchmen who had volunteered for the Legion of French Volunteers Against Bolshevism on the Eastern Front; it took the occupation authorities some time to realize that the manual was a communist publication meant to train the FTP for actions against them.

On 21 August 1941, a French communist, Pierre Georges, assassinated the German naval officer Anton Moser in the Paris Metro, the first time the resistance had killed a German. The German Military Governor General Otto von Stülpnagel had three people shot in retaliation, none of whom were connected to the killing. General Stülpnagel announced on 22 August 1941 that for every German killed, he would execute at least ten innocent French people, and that all Frenchmen in German custody were now hostages. On 30 September 1941, Stülpnagel issued the "Code of Hostages", ordering all district chiefs to draw up lists of hostages to be executed in the event of further "incidents", with an emphasis on French Jews and people known for communist or Gaullist sympathies. On 20 October 1941, Oberstleutnant Karl Friedrich Hotz, the Feldkommandant of Nantes, was assassinated on the streets of Nantes; the military lawyer Dr. Hans Gottfried Reimers was assassinated in Bordeaux on 21 October. In retaliation the Wehrmacht shot 50 unconnected French people in Nantes, and announced that if the assassin did not turn himself in by midnight of 23 October, another 50 would be shot. The assassin did not turn himself in, and so another 50 hostages were shot, among them Léon Jost, a former socialist deputy and one-legged veteran of the First World War, who was serving a three-year prison sentence for helping Jews to escape into Spain. The same day, the Feldkommandant of Bordeaux had 50 French hostages shot in that city in retaliation for Reimers's assassination. The executions in Nantes and Bordeaux started a debate about the morality of assassination that lasted until the end of the occupation; some French argued that since the Germans were willing to shoot so many innocent people in reprisal for killing only one German that it was not worth it, while others contended that to cease assassinations would prove that the Germans could brutally push the French around in their own country. General de Gaulle went on the BBC's French language service on 23 October to ask the PCF to call in their assassins, saying that killing one German would not change the outcome of the war and that too many innocent people were being shot by Germans in reprisals. As the PCF did not recognize de Gaulle's authority, the communist assassins continued their work under the slogan "an eye for an eye", and so the Germans continued to execute between 50 and 100 French hostages for every one of their number assassinated.

As more resistance groups started to appear, it was agreed that more could be achieved by working together than apart. The chief promoter of unification was a former préfet of Chartres, Jean Moulin. After identifying the three largest resistance groups in the south of France that he wanted to see co-operate, Moulin went to Britain to seek support. Moulin made a secret trip, visiting Lisbon on 12 September 1941, from where he traveled to London to meet General de Gaulle on 25 October 1941. De Gaulle named Moulin his representative in France, and ordered him to return and unify all Resistance groups and have them recognize the authority of de Gaulle's Free French National Committee in London, which few resistance groups did at the time. To lend further support, in October 1941 de Gaulle founded the BCRA (Bureau Central de Renseignements et d'Action – Central Office for Intelligence and Action) under André Dewavrin, who used the codename "Colonel Passy", to provide support for the Resistance. Though the BCRA was based in an office in Duke Street in London, its relations with the SOE were often strained, as de Gaulle made no secret of his dislike of British support for the resistance groups, which he saw as British meddling in France's domestic affairs. Tensions between Gaullist and non-Gaullist resistance groups led to the SOE dividing its F section in two, with the RF section providing support for Gaullist groups and the F section dealing with the non-Gaullist groups.

British SOE agents parachuted into France to help organize the resistance often complained about what they considered the carelessness of the French groups when it came to security. A favorite tactic of the Gestapo and the Abwehr was to capture a résistant, "turn" him or her to their side, and then send the double agent to infiltrate the resistance network. Numerous resistance groups were destroyed by such double agents, and the SOE often charged that the poor security arrangements of the French resistance groups left them open to being destroyed by one double agent. For example, the Interallié group was destroyed when Carré was captured and turned by Abwehr Captain Hugo Bleicher on 17 November 1941, as she betrayed everyone. The same month, Colonel Alfred Heurtaux of the OCM was betrayed by an informer and arrested by the Gestapo. In November 1941, Frenay recruited Jacques Renouvin, whom he called an "experienced brawler", to lead the new Groupes Francs paramilitary arm of the Combat resistance group. Renouvin taught his men military tactics at a secret boot camp in the countryside in the south of France and led the Groupes Francs in a series of attacks on collaborators in Lyon and Marseille. Frenay and Renouvin wanted to "blind" and "deafen" the French police by assassinating informers who were the "eyes" and "ears" of the police. Renouvin, who was a known "tough guy" and experienced killer, personally accompanied résistants on their first assassinations to provide encouragement and advice. If the would-be assassin was unable to take a life, Renouvin would assassinate the informer himself, then berate the would-be assassin for being a "sissy" who was not tough enough for the hard, dangerous work of the Resistance.

On 7 December 1941, the Nacht und Nebel decree was signed by Hitler, allowing the German forces to "disappear" anyone engaged in resistance in Europe into the "night and fog". During the war, about 200,000 French citizens were deported to Germany under the Nacht und Nebel decree, about 75,000 for being résistants, half of whom did not survive. After Germany declared war on the United States on 11 December 1941, the SOE was joined by the American Office of Strategic Services (OSS) to provide support for the resistance. In December 1941, the industrialist Jacques Arthuys, the chief of the OCM, was arrested by the Gestapo, who later executed him. Leadership of the OCM was assumed by Colonel Alfred Touny of the Deuxième Bureau, which continued to provide intelligence to the Free French leaders in exile in Britain. Under the leadership of Touny, the OCM became one of the Allies' best sources of intelligence in France.

=== 1942: The struggle intensifies ===
On the night of 2 January 1942, Moulin parachuted into France from a British plane with orders from de Gaulle to unify the Resistance and to have all of the resistance accept his authority. On 27 March 1942, the first French Jews were rounded up by the French authorities, sent to the camp at Drancy, then on to Auschwitz to be killed. In April 1942, the PCF created an armed wing of its Main d'Oeuvre Immigrée ("Migrant Workforce") representing immigrants called the FTP-MOI under the leadership of Boris Holban, who came from the Bessarabia region, which belonged alternately to either Russia or Romania. On 1 May 1942, May Day, which Vichy France had tried to turn into a Catholic holiday celebrating St. Philip, Premier Pierre Laval was forced to break off his speech when the crowd began to chant "Mort à Laval" (death to Laval).

As millions of Frenchmen serving in the French Army had been taken prisoner by the Germans in 1940, there was a shortage of men in France during the Occupation, which explains why Frenchwomen played so a prominent role in the Resistance, with the résistante Germaine Tillion later writing: "It was women who kick-started the Resistance." In May 1942, speaking before a military court in Lyon, the résistante Marguerite Gonnet, when asked about why she had taken up arms against the Reich, replied: "Quite simply, colonel, because the men had dropped them." In 1942, the Royal Air Force (RAF) attempted to bomb the Schneider-Creusot works at Lyon, which was one of France's largest arms factories. The RAF missed the factory and instead killed around 1,000 French civilians. Two Frenchmen serving in the SOE, Raymond Basset (codename Mary) and André Jarrot (codename Goujean), were parachuted in and were able to repeatedly sabotage the local power grid to sharply lower production at the Schneider-Creusot works. Frenay, who had emerged as a leading résistant, recruited the engineer Henri Garnier living in Toulouse to teach French workers at factories producing weapons for the Wehrmacht how best to drastically shorten the lifespan of the Wehrmacht's weapons, usually by making deviations of a few millimetres, which increased strain on the weapons; such acts of quiet sabotage were almost impossible to detect, which meant no French people would be shot in reprisal.

To maintain contact with Britain, Resistance leaders crossed the English Channel at night on a boat, made their way via Spain and Portugal, or took a "spy taxi", as the British Lysander aircraft were known in France, which landed on secret airfields at night. More commonly, contact with Britain was maintained via radio. The Germans had powerful radio detection stations based in Paris, Brittany, Augsburg, and Nuremberg that could trace an unauthorized radio broadcast to within 16 kilometres (10 miles) of its location. Afterwards, the Germans would send a van with radio detection equipment to find the radio operator, so radio operators in the Resistance were advised not to broadcast from the same location for long. To maintain secrecy, radio operators encrypted their messages using polyalphabetic ciphers. Finally, radio operators had a security key to begin their messages with; if captured and forced to radio Britain under duress, the radio operator would not use the key, which tipped London off that they had been captured.

On 29 May 1942 it was announced that all Jews living in the occupied zone had to wear a yellow star of David with the words Juif or Juive at all times by 7 June 1942. Ousby described the purpose of the yellow star "not just to identify but also to humiliate, and it worked". On 14 June 1942, a 12-year-old Jewish boy committed suicide in Paris as his classmates were shunning the boy with the yellow star. As a form of quiet protest, many Jewish veterans started to wear their medals alongside the yellow star, which led the Germans to ban the practice as "inappropriate", as it increased sympathy for men who fought and suffered for France. At times, ordinary people would show sympathy for Jews; as a Scot married to a Frenchman, Janet Teissier du Cros wrote in her diary about a Jewish woman wearing her yellow star of David going shopping:

She came humbly up and stood hesitating on the edge of the pavement. Jews were not allowed to stand in queues. What they were supposed to do I never discovered. But the moment the people in the queue saw her they signaled to her to join us. Secretly and rapidly, as in the game of hunt-the-slipper, she was passed up till she stood at the head of the queue. I am glad to say that not one voice was raised in protest, the policeman standing near turned his head away, and that she got her cabbage before any of us.

By 1942, the Paris Kommandantur was receiving an average of 1,500 poison pen letters from corbeaux wishing to settle scores, which kept the occupation authorities informed about what was happening in France. One of these corbeaux, a Frenchwoman, wrote:

Since you are taking care of the Jews, and if your campaign is not just a vain word, then have a look at the kind of life led by the girl M.A, formerly a dancer, now living at 41 Boulevard de Strasbourg, not wearing a star. This creature, for whom being Jewish is not enough, debauches the husbands of proper Frenchwomen, and you may well have an idea what she is living off. Defend women against Jewishness—that will be your best publicity, and you will return a French husband to his wife.

In the spring of 1942, a committee consisting of SS Hauptsturmführer Theodor Dannecker, the Commissioner for Jewish Affairs Louis Darquier de Pellepoix, and general secretary of the police René Bousquet began planning a grande rafle (great round-up) of Jews to deport to the death camps. On the morning of 16 July 1942, the grande rafle began with 9,000 French policemen rounding up the Jews of Paris, leading to some 12,762 Jewish men, women and children being arrested and brought to the Val d'Hiv sports stadium, from where they were sent to the Drancy camp and finally Auschwitz. The grand rafle was a Franco-German operation; the overwhelming majority of those who arrested the Jews were French policemen. Some 100 Jews warned by friends in the police killed themselves, while 24 Jews were killed resisting arrest. One Jewish Frenchwoman, Madame Rado, who was arrested with her four children, noted about the watching bystanders: "Their expressions were empty, apparently indifferent." When taken with the other Jews to the Place Voltaire, one woman was heard to shout "Well done! Well done!" while the man standing to her warned her "After them, it'll be us. Poor people!". Rado survived Auschwitz, but her four children were killed in the gas chambers.

Cardinal Pierre-Marie Gerlier of Lyon, a staunch antisemite who had supported Vichy's efforts to solve the "Jewish question" in France, opposed the rafles of Jews, arguing in a sermon that the "final solution" was taking things too far; he felt it better to convert Jews to Roman Catholicism. Archbishop Jules-Géraud Saliège of Toulouse, in a pastoral letter of 23 August 1942, declared: "You cannot do whatever you wish against these men, against these women, against these fathers and mothers. They are part of mankind. They are our brothers." Pastor Marc Boegner, president of the National Protestant Federation, denounced the rafles in a sermon in September 1942, asking Calvinists to hide Jews. A number of Catholic and Calvinist schools and organizations such as the Jesuit Pierre Chaillet's l'Amitié Chrétienne took in Jewish children and passed them off as Christian. Many Protestant families, with memories of their own persecution, had already begun to hide Jews, and after the summer of 1942, the Catholic Church, which until then had been broadly supportive of Vichy's antisemitic laws, began to condemn antisemitism, and organized efforts to hide Jews. The official story was that the Jews were being "resettled in the East", being moved to a "Jewish homeland" somewhere in Eastern Europe. As the year continued, the fact that no one knew precisely where this Jewish homeland was, together with the fact that those sent to be "resettled" were never heard from again, led more and more people to suspect that rumors of the Jews being exterminated were true.

Ousby argued that, given the widespread belief that the Jews in France were mostly illegal immigrants from Eastern Europe who ought to be sent back to where they came from, it was remarkable that so many ordinary people were prepared to attempt to save them. Perhaps the most remarkable example was the effort of the Calvinist couple André and Magda Trocmé, who brought together an entire commune, Le Chambon-sur-Lignon, to save between 800 and 1,000 Jews. The Jews in France, whether they were Israélites or immigrant Juifs, had begun the occupation discouraged and isolated, cut off and forced to become "absent from the places they lived in. Now, as the threat of absence become brutally literal, their choices were more sharply defined, more urgent even than for other people in France." As an example of the "differing fates" open to French Jews from 1942 onward, Ousby used the three-part dedication to the memoir Jacques Adler wrote in 1985: the first part dedicated to his father, who was killed at Auschwitz in 1942; the second to the French family who sheltered his mother and sister, who survived the Occupation; and the third to the members of the Jewish resistance group Adler joined later in 1942.

As in World War I and the Franco-Prussian War, the Germans argued that those engaging in resistance were "bandits" and "terrorists", maintaining that all Francs-tireurs were engaging in illegal warfare and therefore had no rights. On 5 August 1942, three Romanians belonging to the FTP-MOI tossed grenades into a group of Luftwaffe men watching a football game at the Jean-Bouin Stadium in Paris, killing eight and wounding 13. The Germans claimed three were killed and 42 wounded; this let them execute more hostages, as Field Marshal Hugo Sperrle demanded three hostages be shot for every dead German and two for each of the wounded. The Germans did not have that many hostages in custody and settled for executing 88 people on 11 August 1942. The majority of those shot were communists or relatives of communists, along with the father and father-in-law of Pierre Georges and the brother of the communist leader Maurice Thorez. A number were Belgian, Dutch, and Hungarian immigrants to France; all went before the firing squads singing the French national anthem or shouting Vive la France!, a testament to how even the communists by 1942 saw themselves as fighting for France as much as for world revolution.

Torture of captured résistants was routine. Methods of torture included beatings, shackling, being suspended from the ceiling, being burned with a blowtorch, allowing dogs to attack the prisoner, being lashed with ox-hide whips, being hit with a hammer, or having heads placed in a vice, and the baignoire, whereby the victim was forced into a tub of freezing water and held nearly to the point of drowning, a process repeated for hours. A common threat to a captured résistant was to have a loved one arrested or a female relative or lover sent to the Wehrmacht field brothels. The vast majority of those tortured talked. At least 40,000 French died in such prisons. The only way to avoid torture was to be "turned", with the Germans having a particular interest in turning radio operators who could compromise an entire Resistance network. Captured résistants were held in filthy, overcrowded prisons full of lice and fleas and fed substandard food or held in solitary confinement.

On 1 December 1942, a new resistance group, the ORA, Organisation de résistance de l'armée (Army Resistance Organization), was founded. The ORA was headed by General Aubert Frère and recognized General Henri Giraud as France's leader. For a time in 1942–1943, there were two rival leaders of the Free French movement in exile: General Giraud, backed by the United States, and General de Gaulle, backed by Great Britain. For these reasons, the ORA had bad relations with the Gaullist resistance while being favored by the OSS, as the Americans did not want de Gaulle as France's postwar leader. By the end of 1942, there were 278 sabotage actions in France vs. 168 Anglo-American bombings in France.

=== 1943: A mass movement emerges ===
On 26 January 1943, Moulin persuaded the three main resistance groups in the south of France—Franc-Tireur, Liberation and Combat—to unite as the MUR (Mouvements Unis de la Résistance or United Resistance Movement), whose armed wing was the AS (Armée Secrète or Secret Army). The MUR recognised General de Gaulle as the leader of France and selected General Charles Delestraint (codename Vidal) as the commander of the AS. Moulin followed this success by contacting resistance groups in the north such as Ceux de la Résistance, Ceux de la Libération, Comité de Coordination de Zone Nord, and Libération Nord to ask them to join.

Reflecting the growth of the Resistance, on 30 January 1943, the Milice was created to hunt down the résistants, although initially that was only one of the Milice's tasks; it was first presented as an organisation to crack down on the black market. The Milice, commanded by Joseph Darnand, was a mixture of fascists, gangsters, and adventurers with a "sprinkling of the respectable bourgeoisie and even the disaffected aristocracy" committed to fight to the death against the "Jews, Communists, Freemasons and Gaullists"; the oath of those who joined required to them to commit to work for the destruction in France of the "Jewish leprosy", the Gaullists and the Communists. The Milice had 29,000 members, of whom 1,000 belonged to the elite Francs-Gardes and wore a uniform of khaki shirts, black berets, black ties, blue trousers and blue jackets. Their symbol was the white gamma, the zodiacal sign of the Ram, symbolising renewal and power. The Germans did not want any of the French to be armed, even collaborators, and initially refused to provide the Milice with weapons.

On 16 February 1943, the Service du Travail Obligatoire (STO) organisation was created, requiring able-bodied Frenchmen to work in Germany. In the Reich, with so many men called up for service with the Wehrmacht and the Nazi régime reluctant to have German women work in factories (Hitler believed working damaged a woman's womb), the German state brought foreign workers to Germany to replace the men serving in the Wehrmacht. At the Dora works near the Buchenwald concentration camp, about 10,000 slave workers, mostly French and Russian, built V2 rockets in a vast subterranean factory; they lived in quarters meant to house only 2,500, were allowed to sleep only four and half hours every night, and were regularly brutalised by the guards. The chief pleasure of the slaves was urinating on the machinery when the guards were not looking. The underground press gave much coverage to the conditions at the Dora works, pointing out those Frenchmen who went to work in Germany were not paid the generous wages promised by the Organisation Todt and instead were turned into slaves, all of which the underground papers used as reasons for why the French should not go to work in Germany. Under the law of 16 February 1943, all able-bodied Frenchmen aged 20–22 who were not miners, farmers or university students had to report to the STO to do two years labour in Germany.

As the occupation went on, service with the STO was widened, with farmers and university students losing their exempt status until 1944, when all fit men aged 18–60 and women aged 18–45 were being called up for service with the STO. Men over 45 and women serving in the STO were guaranteed not to go to Germany and many were put to work building the Atlantic Wall for the Organisation Todt, but had no way of knowing where they would go. The so-called réfractaires attempted to avoid being called up and often went into hiding rather work for the Reich. At least 40,000 Frenchmen (80% of the resistance were people under thirty) fled to the countryside, becoming the core of the maquis guerrillas. They rejected the term réfractaire with its connotations of laziness and called themselves the maquis, which originated as Corsican Italian slang for bandits, whose root word was macchia, the term for the scrubland and forests of Corsica. Those who lived in the macchia of Corsica were usually bandits, and those men fleeing to the countryside chose the term maquis as a more romantic and defiant term than réfractaire. By June 1943, the term maquis, which had been a little-known word borrowed from the Corsican dialect of Italian at the beginning of 1943, became known all over France. It was only in 1943 that guerilla warfare emerged in France as opposed to the more sporadic attacks against the Germans that had continued since the summer of 1941, and the Resistance changed from an urban movement to a rural movement, most active in central and southern France.

Fritz Sauckel, the General Plenipotentiary for Labour Deployment and the man in charge of bringing slaves to German factories, demanded the flight of young men to the countryside be stopped and called the maquis "terrorists", "bandits" and "criminals". One of every two French people called to serve in the STO failed to do so. Sauckel had been ordered by Hitler in February 1943 to produce half a million workers from France for German industry by March, and it was he who had pressured Laval to create the STO with the law of 16 February 1943. Sauckel had joined the NSDAP in 1923, making him an Alter Kämpfer (Old Fighter), and like many other Alte Kämpfer (who tended to be the most extreme Nazis), Sauckel was a hard man. Despite warnings from Laval, Sauckel took the view that he was ordered by Albert Speer to produce a quota of slaves for German industry, that the men joining the maquis were sabotaging German industry by fleeing to the countryside, and the solution was simply to kill them all. Sauckel believed that once the maquis were wiped out, Frenchmen would obediently report to the STO and go to work in Germany. When Laval was presented with Sauckel's latest demand for French labor for German industry, he remarked: "Have you been sent by de Gaulle?". Laval argued the réfractaires were not political opponents and should not be treated as such, arguing that an amnesty and a promise that the réfractaires would not be sent as slaves to Germany would nip the budding maquis movement.

As Laval predicted, the hardline policies that Sauckel advocated turned the basically apolitical maquis political, driving them straight into the resistance as the maquisards turned to the established resistance groups to ask for arms and training. Sauckel decided that if Frenchmen would not report to the STO, he would have the Todt organisation use the shanghaillage (shanghaiing), storming into cinemas to arrest the patrons or raiding villages in search of bodies to turn into slaves to meet the quotas. Otto Abetz, the Francophile German ambassador to Vichy, had warned that Sauckel was driving the maquis into the resistance with his hardline policies and joked to Sauckel that the maquis should put up a statue of him with the inscription "To our number one recruitment agent". The French called Sauckel "the slave trader". Furthermore, as Laval warned, the scale of the problem was beyond Vichy's means to solve. The prefets of the departments of the Lozère, the Hérault, the Aude, the Pyrénées-Orientales and Aveyron had been given a list of 853 réfractaires to arrest, and managed during the next four months to arrest only 1 réfractaire.

After the Battle of Stalingrad, which ended with the destruction of the entire German 6th Army in February 1943, many had started to doubt the inevitability of an Axis victory, and most French gendarmes were not willing to hunt down the maquis, knowing that they might be tried for their actions if the Allies won. Only the men of the Groupe mobile de réserve paramilitary police were considered reliable, but the force was too small to hunt down thousands of men. As the Germans preferred to subcontract the work of ruling France to the French while retaining ultimate control, it was the Milice that was given the task of destroying the maquis. The Milice was in Ousby's words "Vichy's only instrument for fighting the Maquis. Entering the popular vocabulary at more or less the same time, the words maquis and milice together defined the new realities: the one a little-known word for the back country of Corsica, which became a synonym for militant resistance; the other a familiar word meaning simply "militia", which became a synonym for militant repression. The Maquis and the Milice were enemies thrown up by the final chaos of the Occupation, in a sense twins symbiotically linked in a final hunt."

The established Resistance groups soon made contact with the maquis, providing them with paramilitary training. Frenay remembered:

We established contact with them through our departmental and regional chiefs. Usually these little maquis voluntarily followed our instructions, in return for which they expected food, arms and ammunition ... It seemed to me that these groups, which were now in hiding all over the French mountain country, might well be transformed into an awesome combat weapon. The maquisards were all young, all volunteers, all itching for action ... It was up to us to organize them and give them a sense of their role in the struggle.

The terrain of central and southern France with its forests, mountains, and shrubland was ideal for hiding. The Germans could not spare thousands of men to hunt the maquis down, and instead sent spotter planes to find them. The maquis were careful about concealing fires and could usually avoid aerial detection. The only other way of breaking up the maquis bands was to send in a spy, which was highly dangerous work as the maquisards would execute infiltrators. Joining the men fleeing the service with the STO were others targeted by the Reich, such as Jews, Spanish Republican refugees, and Allied airmen shot down over France. One maquis band in the Cévennes region consisted of German communists who had fought in the Spanish Civil War and fled to France in 1939. Unlike the urban resistance groups that emerged in 1940–42, who took political names such as Combat, Liberté or Libération, the maquis bands chose apolitical names, such as the names of animals (Ours, Loup, Tigre, Lion, Puma, Rhinocéros and Eléphant) or people (Maquis Bernard, the Maquis Socrate, the Maquis Henri Bourgogne, or one band whose leader was a doctor, hence the name Maquis le Doc). The maquis bands that emerged in the countryside soon formed a subculture with its own slang, dress and rules. The most important maquis rule was the so-called "24-hour rule", under which a captured maquisard had to hold out under torture for 24 hours to give time for his comrades to escape. An underground pamphlet written for young men considering joining the maquis advised:

Men who come to the Maquis to fight live badly, in precarious fashion, with food hard to find. They will be absolutely cut off from their families for the duration; the enemy does not apply the rules of war to them; they cannot be assured any pay; every effort will be made to help their families, but it is impossible to give any guarantee in this manner*; all correspondence is forbidden.

Bring two shirts, two pairs of underpants, two pairs of woollen socks; a light sweater, a scarf, a heavy sweater, a woollen blanket, an extra pair of shoes, shoelaces, needles, thread, buttons, safety pins, soap, a canteen, a knife and fork, a torch, a compass, a weapon if possible, and also a sleeping bag if possible. Wear a warm suit, a beret, a raincoat, a good pair of hobnailed boots.

Another pamphlet written for the maquis advised:

A maquisard should stay only where he can see without being seen. He should never live, eat, sleep except surrounded by look-outs. It should never be possible to take him by surprise.

A maquisard should be mobile. When a census or enlistment [for the STO] brings new elements he has no means of knowing into his group, he should get out. When one of the members deserts, he should get out immediately. The man could be a traitor.

Réfractaires, it is not your duty to die uselessly.

One maquisard recalled his first night out in the wilderness:

Darkness falls in the forest. On one path, some distance from the our camp, two boys stand guard over the safety of their comrades. One has a pistol, the other a service rifle, with a few spare cartridges in a box. Their watch lasts for two hours. How amazing those hours on duty in the forest at night are! Noises come from everywhere and the pale light of the moon gives everything a queer aspect. The boy looks at a small tree and think he sees it move. A lorry passes on a distant road; could it be the Germans? ... Are they going to stop?

Ousby stated that the "breathless prose" in which this maquisard remembered his first night out in the forest was typical of the maquisards whose main traits were their innocence and naivety; many seemed not to understand just precisely who they were taking on or what they were getting themselves into by fleeing to the countryside.

Unlike the andartes, who were resisting Axis rule in Greece and preferred a democratic decision-making progress, the maquis bands tended to be dominated by a charismatic leader, usually an older man who was not a réfractaire; a chef who was commonly a community leader; somebody who before the war had been a junior political or military leader under the Third Republic; or somebody who had been targeted by the Reich for political or racial reasons. Regardless whether they had served in the military, the maquis chefs soon started calling themselves capitaines or colonels. The aspect of life in the maquis best remembered by veterans was their youthful idealism, with most of the maquisards remembering how innocent they were, seeing their escape into the countryside as a grand romantic adventure, by which, as Ousby observed, "they were nervously confronting new dangers they barely understood; they were proudly learning new techniques of survival and battle. These essential features stand out in accounts by maquisards even after innocence had quickly given way to experience, which made them regard danger and discipline as commonplace." The innocence of the maquisards was reflected in the choice of names they took, which were usually whimsical and boyish names, unlike those used by the résistants in the older groups, which were always serious. The maquis had little in the way of uniforms, with the men wearing civilian clothing with a beret being the only common symbol of the maquis, as a beret was sufficiently common in France not to be conspicuous, but uncommon enough to be the symbol of a maquisard. To support themselves, the maquis took to theft, with bank robbery and stealing from the Chantiers de Jeunesse (the Vichy youth movement) being especially favored means of obtaining money and supplies. Albert Spencer, a Canadian airman shot down over France while on a mission to drop leaflets over France who joined the maquis, discovered the distinctive slang of the maquisards, learning that the leaflets he had been dropping over France were torche-culs (ass-wipes) in maquis slang.

As the maquis grew, the Milice was deployed to the countryside to hunt them down and the first milicien was killed in April 1943. As neither the maquis or the milice had many guns, the casualties were low at first, and by October 1943 the Milice had suffered only ten dead. The SOE made contact with the maquis bands, but until early 1944 the SOE were unable to convince Whitehall that supplying the Resistance should be a priority.

Until 1944, there were only 23 Halifax bombers committed to supplying Resistance groups for all of Europe, and many in the SOE preferred arming resistance groups in Yugoslavia, Italy and Greece rather than French ones. On 16 April 1943, the SOE agent Odette Sansom was arrested with her fellow SOE agent and lover Peter Churchill by the Abwehr Captain Hugo Bleicher. After her arrest, Sansom was tortured for several months, which she recounted in the 1949 book Odette: The Story of a British Agent. Sansom recalled:

In those places the only thing one could try to keep was a certain dignity. There was nothing else. And one could have a little dignity and try to prove that one had a little spirit and, I suppose, that kept one going. When everything else was too difficult, too bad, then one was inspired by so many things-people; perhaps a phrase one would remember that one had heard a long time before, or even a piece of poetry or a piece of music.

On 26 May 1943, in Paris, Moulin chaired a secret meeting attended by representatives of the main resistance groups to form the CNR (Conseil National de la Résistance-National Council of the Resistance). With the National Council of the Resistance, resistance activities started to become more coordinated. In June 1943, a sabotage campaign began against the French rail system. Between June 1943 – May 1944, the Resistance damaged 1,822 trains, destroyed 200 passenger cars, damaged about 1,500 passenger cars, destroyed about 2,500 freight cars and damaged about 8,000 freight cars.

The résistant René Hardy had been seduced by the French Gestapo agent Lydie Bastien whose true loyalty was to her German lover, Gestapo officer Harry Stengritt. Hardy was arrested on 7 June 1943 when he walked into a trap laid by Bastien. After his arrest, Hardy was turned by the Gestapo as Bastien tearfully told him that she and her parents would all be sent to a concentration camp if he did not work for the Gestapo. Hardy was unaware that Bastien really loathed him and was only sleeping with him under Stengritt's orders. On 9 June 1943, General Delestraint was arrested by the Gestapo following a tip-off provided by the double agent Hardy and was sent to the Dachau concentration camp. On 21 June 1943, Moulin called a secret meeting in Caluire-et-Cuire suburb of Lyon to discuss the crisis and try to find the traitor who betrayed Delestraint. At the meeting, Moulin and the rest were arrested by the Gestapo. Moulin was brutally tortured, but never talked. Moulin was beaten into a coma and died near or in the train station of Metz on 8 July 1943 as a result of brain damage. Moulin was not the only Resistance leader arrested in June 1943. That same month, General Aubert Frère, the leader of the ORA, was arrested and later executed.

In the summer of 1943, leadership of the FTP-MOI was assumed by an Armenian immigrant Missak Manouchian, who become so famous for organizing assassinations that the FTP-MOI came to be known to the French people as the Groupe Manouchian. In July 1943, the Royal Air Force attempted to bomb the Peugeot works at Sochaux, which manufactured tank turrets and engine parts for the Wehrmacht. The RAF instead hit the neighborhood next to the factory, killing hundreds of French civilians. To avoid a repeat, the SOE agent Harry Rée contacted industrialist Rudolphe Peugeot to see if he was willing to sabotage his own factory. To prove that he was working for London, Rée informed Peugeot that the BBC's French language "personal messages" service would broadcast a message containing lines from a poem that Rée had quoted that night; after hearing the poem in the broadcast, Peugeot agreed to co-operate. Peugeot gave Rée the plans for the factory and suggested the best places to sabotage his factory without injuring anyone by selectively placing plastic explosives. The Peugeot works were largely knocked out in a bombing organised by Rée on 5 November 1943 and output never recovered. The Michelin family were approached with the same offer and declined. The RAF bombed the Michelin factory at Clermont-Ferrand—France's largest tyre factory and a major source of tyres for the Wehrmacht—into the ground.

Despite the blow inflicted by arresting Moulin, by 1 October 1943 the AS had grown to 241,350 members, though most were still unarmed. For the most part, the AS refrained from armed operations as it was no match for the Wehrmacht. Instead the AS forced on preparing for Jour J, (D Day) when the Allies landed in France, after which the AS would begin action. In the meantime, the AS focused on training its members and conducting intelligence-gathering operations for the Allies. In October 1943, Joseph Darnand, the chief of the Milice who had long been frustrated at the unwillingness of the Germans to arm his force, finally won the trust of the Reich by taking a personal oath of loyalty to Hitler and being commissioned as a Waffen-SS officer together with 11 other Milice leaders. With that, the Germans started to arm the Milice, which turned its guns on the Resistance. The weapons the German provided the Milice with were mostly British weapons captured at Dunkirk in 1940, and as the maquis received many weapons from the SOE, it was often the case that in the clashes between Milice and the Maquis, Frenchmen fought Frenchmen with British guns and ammunition.

In October 1943, following a meeting between General Giraud and General de Gaulle in Algiers, orders went out for the AS and ORA to cooperate in operations against the Germans. One of the most famous Resistance actions took place on 11 November 1943 in the town of Oyonnax in the Jura Mountains, where about 300 maquisards led by Henri Romans-Petit arrived to celebrate the 25th anniversary of France's victory over Germany in 1918, wearing improvised uniforms. There were no Germans in Oyonnax that day and the gendarmes made no effort to oppose the Resistance, who marched through the streets to lay a wreath shaped like the Cross of Lorraine at a local war memorial bearing the message "Les vainqueurs de demain à ceux de 14–18" ("From tomorrow's victors to those of 14–18"). Afterwards, the people of Oyonnax joined the maquisards in singing the French national anthem as they marched, an incident given much play on the BBC's French language service about how one town had been "liberated" for a day. The next month, the SS arrested 130 Oyonnax residents and sent them to the concentration camps, shot the town's doctor, and tortured and deported two other people, including the gendarme captain who failed to resist the maquis on 11 November. On 29 December 1943, the AS and the Communist FTP agreed to cooperate; their actions were controlled by the COMAC (Comité Militaire d'Action-Committee for Military Action), which in turn took its orders from the CNR. The Communists agreed to unity largely in the belief that they would obtain more supplies from Britain, and in practice the FTP continued to work independently. The SOE provided training for the Resistance; however, as the SOE agent Roger Miller noted after visiting a resistance workshop making bombs in late 1943:

If the instructors from the training schools in England could have seen those Frenchmen making up charges, the cellar would have looked to them like Dante's Inferno. Every conceivable school "don't" was being done.

=== 1944: The height of the Resistance ===
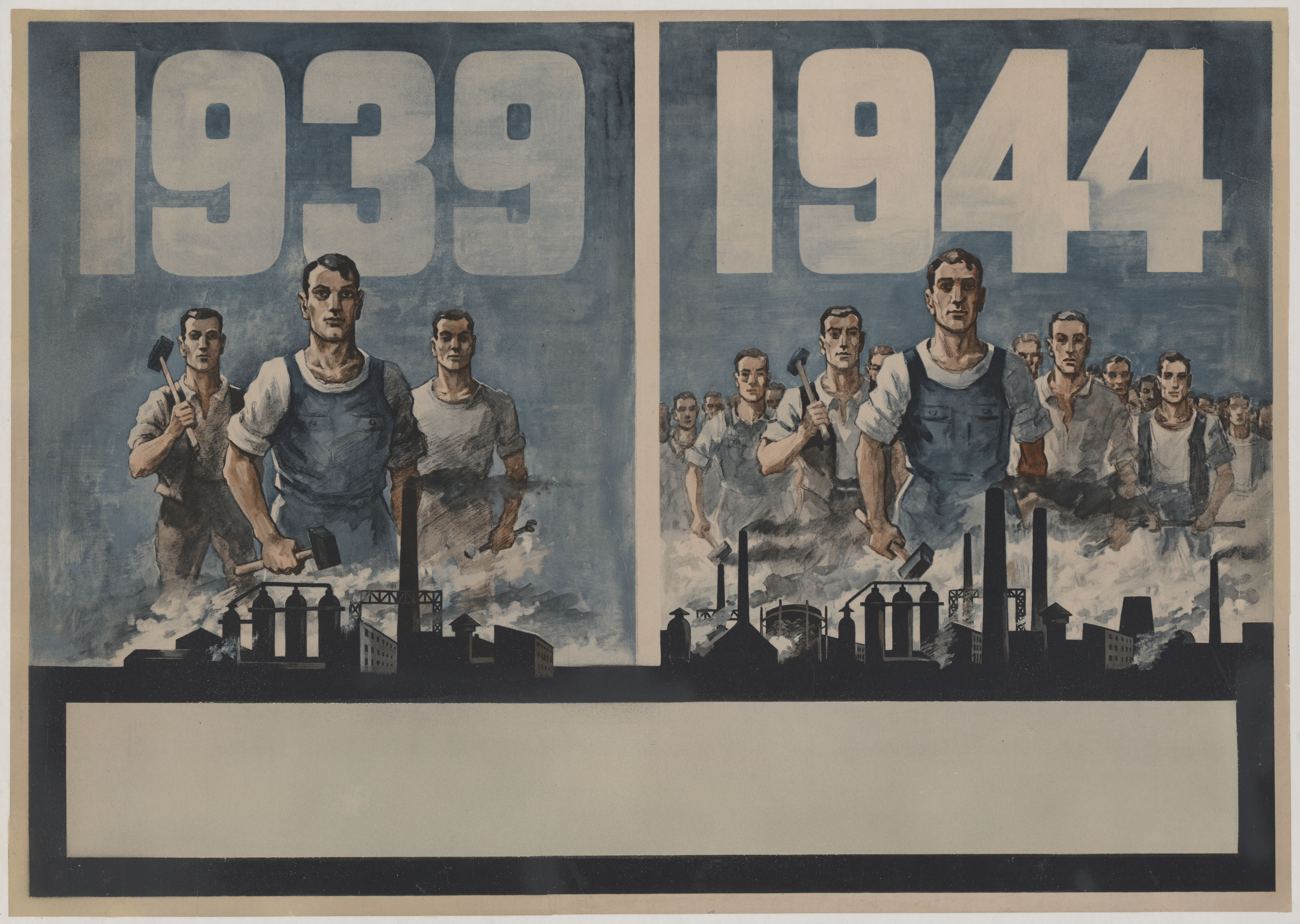
Resistance poster showing the increase in size of the resistance and French forces since 1939

By the beginning of 1944, the BCRA was providing the Allies with two intelligence assessments per day based on information provided by the Resistance. One of the BCRA's most effective networks was headed by Colonel Rémy who headed the Confrérie de Notre Dame (Brotherhood of Notre Dame) which provided photographs and maps of German forces in Normandy, most notably details of the Atlantic Wall. In January 1944, following extensive lobbying by the SOE, Churchill was persuaded to increase by 35 the number of planes available to drop in supplies for the maquis. By February 1944, supply drops were up by 173%. The same month, the OSS agreed to supply the maquis with arms. Despite the perennial shortage of arms, by the early 1944 there were parts of rural areas in the south of France that were more under the control of the maquis than the authorities. By January 1944, a civil war had broken out with the Milice and maquis assassinating alternatively leaders of the Third Republic or collaborators that was to become increasingly savage as 1944 went on. The Milice were loathed by the resistance as Frenchmen serving the occupation and unlike the Wehrmacht and the SS, were not armed with heavy weapons nor were especially well trained, making them an enemy who could be engaged on more or less equal terms, becoming the preferred opponent of the Maquis. The men of the Wehrmacht were German conscripts whereas the Milice were French volunteers, thus explains why the résistants hated the Milice so much. On 10 January 1944, the Milice "avenged" their losses at the hands of the maquis by killing Victor Basch and his wife outside Lyon. The 80 year-old Basch was a French Jew, a former president of the League for the Rights of Men and had been a prominent dreyfusard during the Dreyfus affair, marking him out as an enemy of the "New Order in Europe" by his very existence, though the elderly pacifist Basch was not actually involved in the resistance. The milicien who killed Basch was an anti-Semitic fanatic named Joseph Lécussan who always kept a Star of David made of human skin taken from a Jew he killed earlier in his pocket, making him typical of the Milice by this time.

As the Resistance had not been informed of the details of Operation Overlord, many Resistance leaders had developed their own plans to have the maquis seize large parts of central and southern France, which would provide a landing area for Allied force to be known as "Force C" and supplies to be brought in, allowing "Force C" and the maquis to attack the Wehrmacht from the rear. The Supreme Headquarters of the Allied Expeditionary Force (SHAEF) had rejected this plan under the grounds that the disparity between the firepower and training of the Wehrmacht vs. the maquisards meant that the Resistance would be unable to hold their own in sustained combat. The maquis unaware of this tried to seize "redoubts" several times in 1944 with disastrous results. Starting in late January 1944, a group of maquisards led by Théodose Morel (codename Tom) began to assemble on the Glières Plateau near Annecy in the Haute-Savoie. By February 1944, the maquisards numbered about 460 and had only light weapons, but received much media attention with the Free French issuing a press release in London saying "In Europe there are three countries resisting: Greece, Yugoslavia and the Haute-Savoie". The Vichy state sent the Groupes Mobiles de Réserve to evict the maquis from the Glières plateau and were repulsed. After Morel had been killed by a French policeman during a raid, command of the Maquis des Glières was assumed by Captain Maurice Anjot. In March 1944, the Luftwaffe started to bomb the maquisards on the Glières plateau and on 26 March 1944 the Germans sent in an Alpine division of 7,000 men together with various SS units and about 1,000 miliciens, making for about 10,000 men supported by artillery and air support which soon overwhelmed the maquisards whose lost about 150 killed in action and another 200 captured who were then shot. Anjot knew the odds against his maquis band were hopeless, but decided to take a stand to uphold French honor. Anjot himself was one of the maquisards killed on the Glières plateau.

In February 1944, all of the Resistance governments agreed to accept the authority of the Free French government based in Algiers (until 1962 Algeria was considered to be part of France) and the Resistance was renamed FFI (Forces Françaises de l'Intérieur-Forces of the Interior). The Germans refused to accept the Resistance as legitimate opponents and any résistant captured faced the prospect of torture and/or execution as the Germans maintained that the Hague and Geneva conventions did not apply to the Resistance. By designating the Resistance as part of the French armed forces was intended to provide the Resistance with legal protection and allow the French to threaten the Germans with the possibility of prosecution for war crimes. The designation did not help. For example, the résistante Sindermans was arrested in Paris on 24 February 1944 after she was found to be carrying forged papers. As she recalled: "Immediately, they handcuffed me and took me to be interrogated. Getting no reply, they slapped in the face with such force that I fell from the chair. Then they whipped me with a rubber hose, full in the face. The interrogation began at 10 o'clock in the morning and ended at 11 o'clock that night. I must tell you I had been pregnant for three months".

As part of the preparations for Operation Overlord, Resistance attacks on the rail system increased with the Resistance in the first three months of 1944 damaging 808 locomotives compared to 387 damaged by air attack. Starting with the clearer weather in the spring, between April–June 1944 the Resistance damaged 292 locomotives compared to 1,437 damaged in air strikes. These statistics do not completely tell the story as Resistance sabotage attacks on the rail system in the first half of 1944 were so pervasive that the Germans had to import workers from the Reichsbahn (the German state railroad) and put soldiers on trains as they no longer trusted the Cheminots. On 23 March 1944, General Pierre Koenig was appointed commander of the FFI and flew to London from Algiers to co-ordinate the operations of the FFI at the SHAEF commanded by General Dwight Eisenhower at a section known as État Major des Forces Françaises de l'Intérieur (General Staff, French Forces of the Interior). The American and British officers at SHAEF distrusted the Resistance with the OSS agent William J. Casey writing that many in the Resistance appeared more interested in post-war politics than in fighting the Germans. Despite the mistrust, SHAEF planned to use the Resistance to tie down German forces. In April 1944, there were 331 drops of weapons by the SOE to the maquis, in May 531 drops and in June 866 drops. The most common weapon provided by the SOE was the Sten machine gun, which though inaccurate except at short ranges and prone to breakdown was cheap, light, easy to assemble and disassemble and required no special skills to use. Other weapons dropped by the SOE were the Webley revolver, the Bren machine gun, the Lee-Enfield rifle and the PIAT anti-tank grenade launcher while the OSS provided the M3 "Greasegun", the Browning handgun, the M1 rifle and the bazooka anti-tank rocket launcher. In general, American weaponry was preferred to British weaponry, but the British-built Bren gun emerged as one of the favorite weapons of the resistance. Reflecting the importance of weapons, organizing supply drops was the main concern for the Resistance in the spring of 1944. André Hue, a dual citizen of France and the United Kingdom serving in the SOE who parachuted into Brittany to lead the Hillbilly resistance circuit recalled his principal duty in the spring of 1944 was organizing supply drops and attempting to avoid the Wehrmacht and the Milice. Hue had been born in Wales to a French father and a Welsh mother, and like many other Anglo-French dual citizens had volunteered for the SOE. The Communist FTP often complained that they were being starved of arms by the BCRA with Charles Tillon noting that the BCRA had organized hundreds of supply drops, of which only six were for the FTP.

The spring of 1944 is remembered in France as time of the mentalité terrible, the period of la guerre franco-française when the Milice and the Maquis fought one another without mercy. The Milice and maquis were caught up in ever-escalating cycle of violence with Ousby commenting: "1944 had simply become the time for settling scores, any scores, for revenging grudges, any grudges. Agreed on this common imperative, the sides in the conflict blur and become almost indistinguishable from each other. The Milice hit squads pretended to be the Maquis; the Maquis hit squads pretended to be the Milice. Sometimes it was impossible to tell which was really which, and sometimes it hardly mattered". As it was starting to become more and more clear that the Allies were going to win the war, the Milice become more desperate and vicious as the knowledge that when the Allies won, the miliciens would be tried for treason if they were not killed first. This caused the Milice to engage in increasingly savage torture and killings of the maquisards. They hoped that they could annihilate all of their enemies before the Allies won. For their part, some of the maquisards struck back in kind against the Milice. In the town of Voiron, close to Grenoble, in April 1944, a Maquis assassination squad entered the home of the local Milice chief and killed him, his wife, their infant daughter, their 10-year-old son, and his 82-year-old mother. Outside the village of Saint-Laurent in the Haute-Savoie, a mass grave was discovered in May 1944 of eight gendarmes known for their loyalty to Vichy kidnapped by the Maquis from Bonneville who had been lined up and shot by their captors. The killing of the gendarmes was denounced by the chief collaborationist propagandist Philippe Henriot on the radio as the "French Katyn", who used the killings as an example of the sort of "Bolshevik terrorism" that he maintained was typical of the resistance. In the south of France, the Maquis had started to form an alternative government to Vichy, which still controlled the French civil service. Georges Guingouin, the Communist maquis leader of the Maquis du Limousin in the Limousin region, styled himself a préfet and imposed his own system of rationing on the local farmers that flouted the rationing system imposed by Vichy. In the Auxois region, the Maquis Bernard had created its system of taxation with people being taxed on the basis of their willingness to collaborate with the authorities or support the resistance. When the British philosopher A. J. Ayer arrived in Gascony as a SOE agent in the spring of 1944, he described a power structure established by the maquis that placed power "in the hands of a series of feudal lords whose power and influence were strangely similar to that of their fifteenth-century Gascon counterparts."

Reflecting their weakening power, the authorities grew harsher in their punishments. At the village of Ascq, close to Lille, 86 people were killed in the Ascq massacre on April 1, 1944, by the 12th Waffen SS Division "Hitlerjugend" ("Hitler Youth"). This massacre was committed in reprisal for resistance attacks on the railroads, the first of many villages martyrisés of 1944. Starting on May 20, 1944, there occurred another major clash between the Germans and the maquis at Mont Mouchet when the maquis seized another "redoubt" which led to overwhelming force being brought to bear against them. Émile Coulaudon, the chief of the FFI in the Auvergne, believed that continuing inaction was bad for morale and starting on May 20, 1944, began to concentrate the maquis at Mont Mouchet under the slogan "Free France starts here!" At Mont Mouchet, he gathered about 2,700 men, who formed the Maquis du Mont Mouchet. German attacks forced the Resistance off Mont Mouchet by June, killing about 125 maquisards and wounding about another 125 with the rest escaping. The Germans burned down several small villages in the Mont Mouchet region and executed 70 peasants suspected of aiding the maquis. The "résistants" answered by waging a ferocious guerrilla war against the Germans.

Until the end of May 1944, SHAEF had a "Block Planning" policy for the Resistance under which the Resistance would lie low until Operation Overlord was launched and then afterwards, the Resistance was to launch a full blown guerilla war in all of the French provinces one by one. At the end of May 1944, Eisenhower changed his plans and instead wanted a nationwide guerilla war launched in all of the regions of France with the start of Overlord. The SOE had informed the Resistance leaders to listen to the BBC's "personal messages" French language broadcasts on the 1st, 2nd, 15th and 16th of every month for the messages telling them when Overlord was due to start. If the phrase "l'heure des combats viendra" ("the hour of battle will come"), which was broadcast on 1 June 1944, that was the signal that the Allies would land within the next 15 days. If a line from a poem by Verlaine "Les sanglots longs des violons de l'automne" ("The long sobs of the violins of autumn") was read on the BBC, that was the signal that the invasion was imminent and if the following verse "blessent mon cœur d'une langueur monotone" (wound my heart with a monotonous languor"), which was broadcast on 5 June 1944, then the invasion would occur the next day. In the spring of 1944, a number of uniformed American, French and British soldiers known as the "Jedburgh" teams as part of Operation Jedburgh were landed in France to make contact with the maquis guerillas. A Jedburgh team was a three men crew consisting of a commander, his deputy and a radio operator. One of the "Jeds" was always French with the other two being either British or American whose job was to maintain radio contact with Britain, to provide professional military training to the maquis and in the words of the British historian Terry Crowdy to "tactfully" give professional military leadership. One "Jed", the British officer Tommy Macpherson observed that the FTP used rough methods to motivate people, writing:

The leader of the FTP in the Department of Lot was a very strong character who went under the name of Commissar Georges. He actually held indoctrination classes as well as his military operations and exercised a degree of almost forced recruitment among the young people of the area, threatening their families. But once he got them on board, he did operate against the Germans.

The plans for the Resistance in Operation Overlord were:

- Plan Vert: a systematic sabotage campaign to destroy the French railroad system.
- Plan Rouge: to attack and destroy all German ammunition dumps across France.
- Plan Bleu: to attack and destroy all power lines across France.
- Plan Violet: to attack and destroy phone lines in France.
- Plan Jaune: to attack German command posts.
- Plan Noir: to attack German fuel depots.
- Plan Tortue: to sabotage the roads of France.

General de Gaulle himself was only informed by Churchill on June 4, 1944, that the Allies planned to land in France on 6 June. Until then the Free French leaders had no idea when and where Operation Overlord was due to take place. On 5 June 1944, orders were given to activate Plan Violet. Of all the plans, Plan Violet was most important to Operation Overlord, since destroying telephone lines and cutting underground cables prevented phone calls and orders transmitted by telex from getting through and forced the Germans to use their radios to communicate. As the codebreakers of Bletchley Park had broken many of the codes encrypted by the Enigma Machine, this gave a considerable intelligence advantage to the Allied generals. During the Normandy campaign, the Resistance was so effective in blowing up telephone lines and cables that the Wehrmacht and Waffen SS largely abandoned the French phone system as too unreliable and used the radio instead, thereby allowing Bletchley Park to listen in. On 9 June 1944 Eisenhower reached an agreement recognizing the FFI was part of the Allied order of battle and that Koenig was to operate under his command. On 10 June 1944, Koenig ordered the Resistance not to engage in insurrection nationale like those attempted on the Glières plateau or at Mont Mouchet, instead ordering: "Keep guerilla activity below its maximum level... Do not mass together... Form small separate groups". A statement issued by de Gaulle declared the FFI was part of the French Army and resistance leaders were now all Army officers with those résistants commanding 30 men becoming sous-lieutenants; those commanding 100 becoming lieutenants; those commanding 300 becoming capitaines; those commanding 1,000 men becoming commandants and those commanding 2,000 men becoming lieutenant-colonels. In a press communiqué issued on June 12, 1944, Field Marshal Gerd von Rundstedt declared that he did not recognize the FFI as part of the French Army and ordered the Wehrmacht to summary execute any Frenchman or Frenchwoman serving in the FFI.

The other major Resistance operations were Plan Vert and Plan Tortue. In June 1944, the Resistance destroyed French railroads at 486 points and by 7 June 1944, the day after D-Day, the Wehrmacht complained that due to sabotage that the main railroad lines between Avranches and St. Lô, between Cherbourg and St. Lô and between Caen and St. Lô were now out of action. As the Wehrmacht was forced to use the roads instead of railroads, Plan Tortue focused on ambushing the Wehrmacht and the Waffen SS as they travelled to the battlefields of Normandy. The maquis were joined in their guerrilla campaign by the Jedburgh teams, SOE agents, the "Operational Groups" of the OSS and by teams from the elite British Special Air Service (SAS) regiment. The SAS commandos had jeeps armored with machine guns that they used to travel across French countryside and ambush German convoys. One SAS group, operating in Brittany, had an artillery gun flown in, which they used to destroy German tanks, much to the surprise of the Germans who were not expecting this much firepower to be used in ambushes. A SAS officer, Ian Wellsted, described the maquis band which he operated with:

It was hard to tell what they had been before German labour laws threw them all together in the depths of the wild woods. Some had been shopkeepers, artisans, young sons of wealthy parents. Others were scrum of the gutter and many were soldiers. Now, however, all were much the same. All wore the clothes, and many still the wooden clogs, of peasants. Some lucky ones had scraps of uniforms and British battledress, but predominantly their clothes consisted of drab colored shirts, blue overall trousers and German field boots, whose owners no doubt had ceased to require them for obvious reasons. They wore neither brassards nor regular uniform of any kind. The only distinguishable difference between the men of the Maquis and the men of the country from they had sprung was the pistol cocked aggressively from the trouser tops, the rifle on the shoulder, the Sten on the back or the string of grenades depending on the belt.

Sometimes, the maquis wore armbands featuring the tricolor with either a Cross of Lorraine or the initials FFI stamped on them, so they could maintain that they had insignia and thus a sort of uniform, making them entitled to legal protection under the Geneva and Hague conventions."

Usually, the maquis and their Anglo-American allies would cut down a tree to block a road in the wooded section of the French countryside, sometimes an anti-tank mine would be planted under the tree trunk and the Germans would be ambushed with machine gun and sniper fire when they attempted to remove the tree blocking the road. Such operations seriously delayed the Germans, with the elite 2nd Waffen SS Division Das Reich taking 18 days to travel from Toulouse to Caen, a journey that was expected to take only 3 days. The "Jed" Tommy Macpherson who was attached to a maquis band of 27 French and Spanish communists taught the maquisards to fire their Sten guns with wet clothes wrapped around the barrels, which made the Sten guns sound like heavy machine guns to experienced troops. As such, when the maquis ambushed the men of the Das Reich division, the SS took cover and responded far more cautiously than they would have if they had known that they were only under fire from Sten guns. In a typical ambush of the Das Reich division, Macpherson had a bomb planted on a bridge to knock out a half-truck while having the maquis fire on the SS. When a Panther tank came up to engage the maquis, one of the maquisards threw a "Gammon grenade", which knocked out the tank tracks. As more of the SS tanks began to shell the maquis, Macpherson ordered his men to retreat, content to know he had delayed the Das Reich division by several hours and that he would do the same again the next day, and the next. On 9 June 1944, the Das Reich division took revenge for maquis attacks by hanging 99 people selected at random in the town of Tulle from all the lampposts in the town.

The next day, the Der Führer regiment of the Das Reich division destroyed the town of Oradour-sur-Glane, killing 642 people including 246 women and 207 children. SS Sturmbannführer Adolf Diekmann, the commanding officer of the Der Führer regiment of the Das Reich division had wanted to destroy another French town Oradour-sur-Vayres, whose people were said to be providing food and shelter to the maquis, but had taken a wrong turn on the road, which led him and his men to Oradour-sur-Glane, whose people had never supported the maquis. One Wehrmacht division transferred from the Eastern Front to the Western Front took a week to move from the Soviet Union to the borders of France and another three weeks to move from the French border to the Battle of Caen as Resistance attacks slowed down its movement. An estimate by SHAEF stated the Germans were moving at only 25% of their normal daily speed due to the constant attacks of the maquis all across France.

Though the maquis caused the Germans much difficulty, the guerrillas tended not to fare well in sustained combat. The SOE agent André Hue who was leading a maquis band in Brittany later recalled the Battle of Saint Marcel as the firefight on 18 June 1944 at a farmhouse outside Saint Marcel he was using as his base:

Now every weapon that the enemy possessed was brought to bear on our front line in a cacophony of shots and explosions which could not drown an even more sinister noise: the occasional crack of a single bullet. A man within feet of me slumped to the ground with blood spurting two feet into the air from the side of his neck ... We had anticipated an infantry assault-possibly backed up with light armour, but snipers, a threat we had not met before, were difficult to counter. Within minutes of the first casualty, another seven of our men lay dying within the farm complex: all had been shot from long range.

As the snipers continued to cut down his men while he could hear the sound of panzers coming up in the distance, Hue ordered his men to retreat into the woods under the cover of darkness while using his radio to call in an RAF airstrike that disorganized the Germans enough to make escape possible. Summarizing up the Battle of Saint Marcel, Hue wrote:

The majority of the younger men had never been in battle, and seeing their friends' brains and guts oozing on to the grass and mud made them sick in the head and stomach. Just as terrifying to the young Frenchmen was the sight of those who were wounded and who yet had to die without help. I was not surprised that so many had enough. I was perhaps astonished that the number of defectors were so low.

All over France, the maquis attempted to seize towns in June 1944, expecting the Allies to be there soon, often with tragic results. For instance, in Saint-Amand-Montrond, the maquis seized the town and took 13 miliciens and their associated women prisoners, including the wife of Francis Bout de l'An, a senior leader of the Milice who intervened to take personal charge of the situation to get his wife back. A joint German-milice force marched on Saint-Amand-Montrond, causing the maquis to retreat and when the Axis forces arrived, eleven people were shot on the spot while a number of hostages were taken. The Milice chief of Orléans and the archbishop of Bourges were able to negotiate an exchange on 23 June 1944, where the maquis released their female hostages (except for one woman who chose to join the maquis) in exchange for the Milice releasing their hostages, though the Germans refused to free any of their hostages and instead deported them to the concentration camps. As for the miliciens taken hostage, the maquisards knew if they were freed, they would reveal their hideout and their names as both the miliciens and maquisards had grown up in the same town and knew each other well (men on both sides had once been friends) while at the same time food was in short supply, making their hostages a drain on their food supplies; leading to the maquisards to hang their hostages (shooting them would make too much noise) out in the woods. Bout de l'An decided to seek revenge for his wife's captivity by sending a force of miliciens under Lécussan to round up the surviving Jews of Bourges and buried 36 Jews alive out in the woods, as Bout de l'An believed that the Resistance was all the work of the Jews.

On 23 June 1944, Koenig began to operate, giving orders to all the SOE and OSS agents via the Special Forces Headquarters. By this time, the maquis had formed assassination squads to kill collaborators and on 28 June 1944, a group of maquisards disguised as miliciens were able to enter the apartment of the radio newscaster Philippe Henriot, who was serving as Minister of Information and Propaganda in the Vichy government, and shot him down in front of his wife. Darnard had the Milice go on a rampage after Henriot's assassination, massacring résistants in Toulouse, Clermont-Ferrand, Grenoble, Lyon and other places. For example, seven résistants were publicity shot by the Milice in the town square of Mâcon. All over France, the Germans lashed out against the Resistance in an spree of killings, of which the massacre at Oradour-sur-Glane is merely the most infamous. Speaking of an atrocity committed outside of Nice in July 1944, one man testified at Nurnberg:

Having been attacked ... by several groups of Maquis in the region, by way of reprisals, a Mongolian detachment, still under the SS, went to a farm where two French members of the Resistance had been hidden. Being unable to take them prisoner, these soldiers then took the proprietors of that farm (the husband and wife), and after subjecting them to numerous atrocities (knifing, rape, et cetera) they shot them down with submachine guns. Then they took the son of these victims who was only three years of age, and, after having frightfully tortured him, they crucified him on the gate of the farmhouse.

The reference to the "Mongolians" were to Asians serving in the Red Army who been captured by the Wehrmacht and joined either the German Army's Ostlegionen or the SS; the French called all these men "Mongols" regardless if they were Mongols or not. The Milice was especially hated by the Resistance and captured miliciens could expect little mercy. One maquisard fighting in the Haute-Savoie wrote in his diary about the fate of a milicien taken prisoner in July 1944:

Aged twenty-nine, married three months ago. Made to saw wood in the hot sun wearing a pullover and jacket. Made to drink warm salted water. Ears cut off. Covered with blows from fists and bayonets. Stoned. Made to dig his gave. Made to lie in it. Finished off with a blow in the stomach from a spade. Two days to die.

The rejection of the "Force C" plan had not reached many of the maquis leaders operating out in the countryside and after the news of D-Day, the maquis attempted to seize "redoubts", most notably at the Vercors plateau. Eugène Chavant, the FFI chief in the Isère region ordered all maquis bands to concentrate on the Vercors plateau after hearing of D-Day. By 9 June 1944, some 3,000 maquisards had heeded the call and 3 July 1944 the "Free Republic of the Vercors" was proclaimed. Though the Allies did try to fly in supplies to the "redoubts" and the maquis fought bravely, all these operations ended with the Resistance defeated. In the middle of June, the Wehrmacht had taken the village of Saint-Nizier-du-Moucherotte from the Maquis du Vercors, which severed the link between the Vercors plateau and Grenoble. To celebrate Bastille Day, the US Army Air Force sent in 360 B-17s to drop supplies of weapons to the maquisards on the Vercors plateau. However, the weapons the American dropped were all light weapons and Chavant sent a radio message to Algiers on the night of 21 July 1944 asking for heavy weapons to be air-dropped, called the leaders in Algiers criminals and cowards for not arranging more support, and ended with the line: "That's what we are saying criminals and cowards". In the Battle of the Vercors Plateau, the SS landed a glider company and the maquis suffered very heavy losses. Many of the "German" units fighting on the Vercors were Ostlegionen (Eastern Legions), Red Army POWs, mostly Russians and Ukrainians, who had joined the SS after being taken prisoner in 1942 or 1943. By this point the Germans had taken such heavy losses on the Eastern Front that they needed the manpower of the Ostlegionen to compensate. While the same Alpine division that had taken the Glières plateau in March stormed up the Vercors plateau supported by a tank unit based in Lyon, the SS landed via glider. The maquis lost about 650, killed during the fighting on the Vercors plateau and afterwards, the Germans shot about 200 maquisards, mostly wounded who had been unable to escape together with the medical team that had stayed behind to take care of them. In the aftermath of the Battle of the Vercors, the local people were victims of massive reprisals which included numerous cases of looting, rape and extrajudicial executions.

In early August 1944, Hitler ordered Field Marshal Günther von Kluge to launch Operation Lüttich against the Americans. As the Resistance had severed the telephone lines, the orders for Lüttich were transmitted via the radio in a code that had been broken by the Government Code and Cypher School, leading to Ultra intelligence that gave the Americans advanced notice and time to prepare for the coming offensive. After the breakout from Normandy, Eisenhower had planned to by-pass Paris while Hitler had ordered General Dietrich von Choltitz to destroy Paris rather than allow the city be liberated, stating "Paris must be destroyed from top to bottom, before the Wehrmacht leaves, do not leave a church or cultural monument standing". The FFI in Paris led by Alexandre Parodi and Jacques Chaban-Delmas urged patience while Henri Tanguy (codename Colonel Rol), the FTP chief in Paris wanted to start a revolt, being deterred only by the fact that the Resistance in Paris had about 15,000 men, but only 600 guns, mostly rifles and machine guns. On 19 August 1944, the Paris police, until then still loyal to Vichy, went over to the Resistance as a group of policemen hosted the tricolore over the Préfecture de Police on the Ile de la Cité, which was the first time the tricolor had flown in Paris since June 1940. All over Paris, the outlawed tricolore started to fly over schools, mairies and police stations, an open challenge to German power, and a sign that the French civil service was shifting its loyalty. Emboldened, Tanguy and his men started to attack German forces on the Boulevard Saint-Michel and Boulevard Saint-Germain, leading to a mass insurrection as Parisians started to build barricades in the streets. By the end of the day, about 50 Germans and 150 résistants had been killed and not wanting the Communists to have the credit for liberating Paris, the Gaullist Parodi sanctioned the uprising. Faced with an urban uprising that he was unprepared for, Choltitz arranged a truce with Parodi via the Swedish consul Raoul Nordling, marking the first time that the Germans had treated the resistance as a legitimate opponent.

On 21 August 1944, Koenig was given command of all the BCRA agents, the SOE's F section and RF section agents and the Jedburgh teams, which reflected the political need to put all of the resistance under French control. By the end of August 1944, the SOE had a total of 53 radio stations operating in France, up from the two it had begun with in May 1941.

De Gaulle disapproved of the truce as he used the uprising to order on 22 August General Philippe Leclerc's 2nd Armored Division to liberate Paris, stating he did not want the Communists to liberate the city. On 24 August, French soldiers entered Paris, which led to some hours of intense fighting before Choltitz surrendered on 25 August, though pockets of German and milice forces fought on for several more days as Choltiz simply did not inform his forces of his plans to surrender. On the afternoon of August 25, 1944 de Gaulle returned to Paris, a city he not set foot in since June 1940, to be greeted by vast cheering crowds as he walked down the Champs-Élysées.

As various cities, towns and villages were liberated in France, the Resistance was usually the most organized force that took over. Many résistants were disgusted by the mass influx of new members in the dying days of the struggle, contemptuously calling them the FFS (Forces Françaises de Septembre-French Forces of September) or the Septemberists for short, as all these people had conveniently only discovered their French patriotism in September 1944. In the middle of 1944, Chaban-Delmas had reported to de Gaulle that the FFI numbered 15,000 in Paris, but the time of the liberation of Paris on 25 August 1944, between 50,000 and 60,000 people were wearing FFI armbands. The liberation of France began with D-Day on 6 June 1944, but different areas of France were liberated at different times. Strasbourg was not liberated until November 1944, and some coastal towns on the English Channel and the Atlantic like Dunkirk were still in German hands when the war ended on 8 May 1945. Ousby observed: "There was no national day for Liberation. Each town and village still celebrates a different day, the gaps between them marking advances that often looked bogged down, pockets of German defense that often turned out to be unexpectedly tough. It proved the bitterest of ends to a bitter war." As France was liberated, many résistants enlisted in the French Army, with 75,000 résistants fighting as regular soldiers by November 1944, and by the end of the war, 135,000 résistants were serving with the French forces advancing into Germany. For many resistance leaders who gave themselves the title of captain or colonel, it was quite a comedown to be reduced to a private.

Besides attempting to establish a government, the Resistance took its revenge on collaborators who were often beaten or killed in extrajudicial executions. Miliciens were usually shot without the bother of a trial, and at least 10,000 miliciens were shot in 1944. The young women who had engaged in collaboration horizontale by sleeping with the Germans were singled out and had their heads publicly shaven as a mark of their disgrace, which meant that a good percentage of the young women in France were shaven bald in 1944. The attacks on the young women who had German lovers had the "atmosphere of a savage carnival" as the women were rounded by mobs to be insulted, beaten and shaven. One résistant in the Gard region explained the violence to a reporter in September 1944: "I'll simply say that the majority of the FFI have been outlaws. They are lads from the mining areas...they have been hunted; they have been imprisoned; they have been tortured by miliciens whom they now recognize. It is understandable that they should now want to beat them up". At the time, many feared that France was on the verge of civil war as it was felt that the FTP might attempt to seize power, but owing to the shortage of arms and loyalty to Moscow which recognized General de Gaulle as France's leader, the Communists chose to pursue power via ballots rather than bullets.

In the aftermath of the Liberation, the SOE agents were all ordered out of France as the Anglophobic de Gaulle wished to maintain a version of history where the SOE never existed and the Resistance was entirely a French affair. De Gaulle also promoted a version of history where France for the entire occupation from 1940 to 1944 had been a "nation in arms" with the Resistance representing almost the entirety of the French people had been waging a guerrilla struggle from the beginning of the occupation right to its end. His concern was then to rebuild France not only on the material and international level, but also morally, pushing him to put forward the actions of the Resistance to re-establish national unity and pride, which the war had damaged. On 17 September 1944, in Bordeaux, the SOE agent Roger Landes, who become the leader of the Resistance in Bordeaux after André Grandclément, the previous leader had been exposed as a Gestapo informer, was taking part in the celebrations of the liberation of Bordeaux when General de Gaulle motioned to him to come aside for a chat. De Gaulle told Landes, who was wearing the uniform of a British Army officer that he was not welcome in France and had two hours to leave the city and two days to leave France. The Francophile Landes who had been born in Britain, but grew up in France was profoundly hurt by this request, and sadly left the nation he loved so much. De Gaulle had wanted a resistance to give proof of France éternelle that held out against the occupation; however, he was angered by the fact that the résistants often seemed to consider themselves as the new legitimate authorities of the towns and cities they had liberated. Therefore, in the wake of the liberation of the national territory, he openly considered them as troublemakers hindering the return to normalcy and rule of law which he pursued. Everywhere, the résistants were pushed out of power to be replaced by the same civil servants who had served first the Third Republic to be followed by Vichy or the naphtalinés, Army officers who had gone into retirement in 1940, and resumed their service with the liberation.

== Factions ==
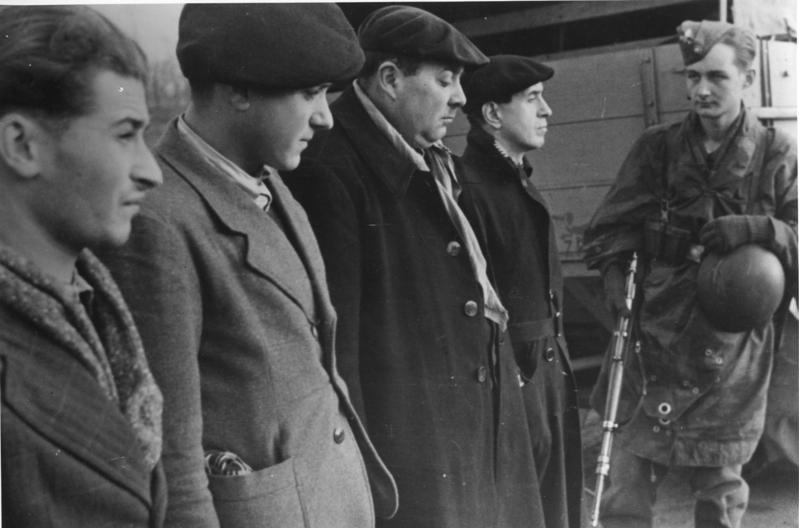
Resistant prisoners in France, July 1944

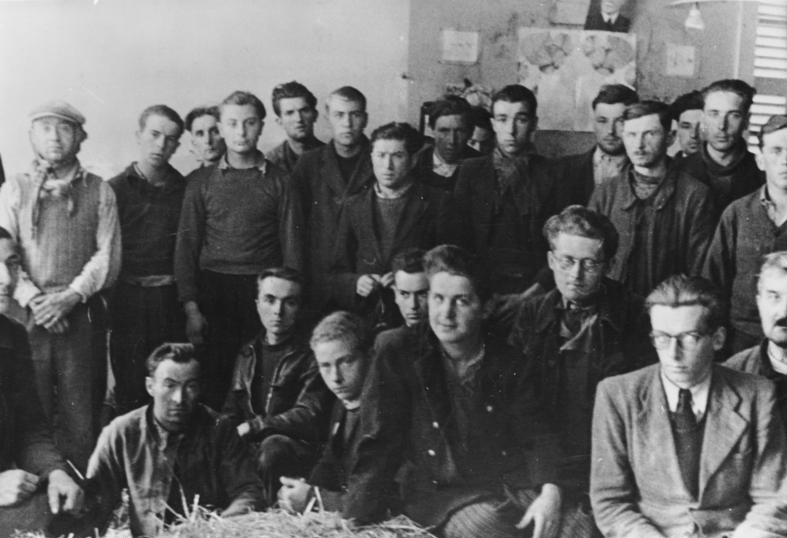
Resistant prisoners in France, 1940

The French Resistance involved men and women representing a broad range of ages, social classes, occupations, religions and political affiliations. In 1942, one resistance leader claimed that the movement received support from four groups: the "lower middle" and "middle middle" classes, university professors and students, the entire working class and a large majority of the peasants.

Resistance leader Emmanuel d'Astier de La Vigerie observed that the Resistance had been composed of social outcasts or those on the fringes of society, saying "one could be a resister only if one was maladjusted". Although many, including d'Astier himself, did fit this description, most members of the Resistance came from traditional backgrounds and were "individuals of exceptional strong-mindedness, ready to break with family and friends" to serve a higher purpose.

The question of how many were active in the Resistance has been raised. While stressing that the issue was sensitive and approximate, François Marcot, a professor of history at the Sorbonne, ventured an estimate of 200,000 activists and a further 300,000 with substantial involvement in Resistance operations. Historian Robert Paxton estimated the number of active resisters at "about 2% of the adult French population (or about 400,000)", and went on to observe that "there were, no doubt, wider complicities, but even if one adds those willing to read underground newspapers, only some two million persons, or around 10% of the adult population", had been willing to risk any involvement at all. The post-war government of France officially recognised 220,000 men and women.

=== Gaullist resistance ===
The French flag with the Cross of Lorraine, emblem of the Free French

The doctrine of Gaullism was born during the Second World War as a French movement of patriotic resistance to the German invasion of 1940. Men of all political stripes who wanted to continue the fight against Adolf Hitler and who rejected the armistice concluded by Maréchal Philippe Pétain rallied to General Charles de Gaulle's position. As a consequence, on 2 August 1940, de Gaulle was condemned to death in absentia by the Vichy régime.

Between July and October 1940, de Gaulle rejected the unconstitutional, repressive and racist laws instituted by Pétain, and established his own bona fides (good faith) as the principal defender of republican values. He asked, in his Appeal of 18 June 1940, that every patriot who could reach British territory should do so and join the Free French Army to fight in company with the Allies. The Free French forces also rallied the various French overseas colonies to fight back against the Vichy régime. His approval of this link between the Resistance and the colonials legitimised it.

De Gaulle's influence grew, despite few in France knowing what he looked like or anything about him. The first open defiance of Nazi rule in Paris was in November 1940, when 3,000 students at the Arc de Triomphe shouted "Vive de Gaulle" and "Vive la France", some carrying two fishing rods (deux gaules). Vichy police called arrested subversives "Gaullists"; although Pétain never mentioned his rival's name in public, everyone knew what "dissidents" meant in speeches. In 1942 Richard de Rochemont quoted a resistance leader describing de Gaulle as "the only possible leader for the France that fights". Most Gaullists could not join him in Britain and remained in the territories ruled by Vichy. The Allies helped build networks of propagandists, spies and saboteurs to harass and discomfit the occupiers. Eventually, leaders of all of these separate and fragmented Resistance organizations were gathered and coordinated by Jean Moulin under the auspices of the National Council of Resistance (CNR), de Gaulle's formal link to the irregulars throughout occupied France.

During the Italian campaign of 1943, 130,000 Free French soldiers fought on the Allied side and, by the time of the Normandy invasion, Free French forces numbered approximately half a million regulars and more than 100,000 French Forces of the Interior (FFI). The Free French 2nd Armored Division, under General Philippe Leclerc, landed in Normandy, and, in the waning days of summer 1944, led the drive toward Paris. The FFI in Normandy and the Île-de-France region surrounding Paris began to harass German forces intensively, cutting roads and railways, setting ambushes and fighting conventional battles alongside their allies.

The Free French 2nd Armored Division (numbering 14,000 men) rolled ashore in Normandy on 1 August 1944, and served under General Patton's Third Army. The division played a critical role in Operation Cobra, the Allies' "breakout" from its Normandy beachhead, where it served as a link between American and Canadian armies and made rapid progress against German forces. The 2nd Armored all but destroyed the 9th Panzer Division and mauled several other German units as well. During the battle for Normandy this German division lost 133 killed, 648 wounded and 85 missing. The division's matériel losses included 76 armored vehicles, seven cannons, 27 half-tracks and 133 other vehicles.

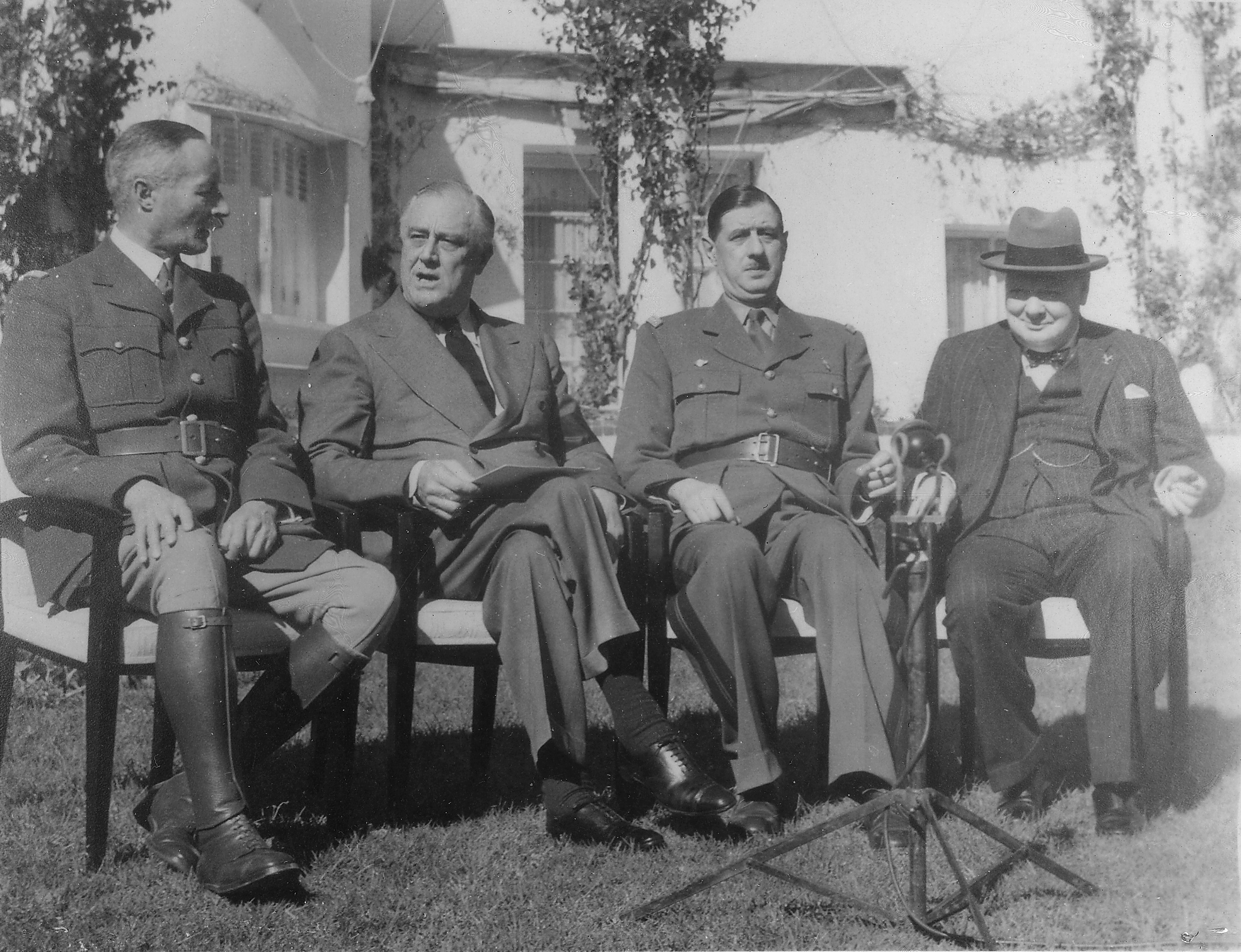
Free French Generals Henri Giraud (left) and Charles de Gaulle sit down after shaking hands in the presence of Franklin Roosevelt and Winston Churchill at the Casablanca Conference, on 14 January 1943.

The most celebrated moment in the unit's history involved the liberation of Paris. Allied strategy emphasized destroying German forces retreating towards the Rhine, but when the French Resistance under Henri Rol-Tanguy staged an uprising in the city, De Gaulle, upon receiving intelligence that the French Resistance had openly risen up against the German occupiers, and unwilling to allow his countrymen to be slaughtered against the entrenched and better-armed Germans, as had happened to the Polish Resistance in the Warsaw Uprising, petitioned Eisenhower for an immediate frontal assault. He threatened to detach the French 2nd Armored Division (2e DB) and order them to single-handedly attack Paris, bypassing the SHAEF chain of command, if he delayed approval unduly. Eisenhower relented, and Leclerc's forces headed toward Paris. After hard fighting that cost the 2nd Division 35 tanks, 6 self-propelled guns and 111 vehicles, Dietrich von Choltitz, the military governor of Paris, surrendered the city in a ceremony at the Hotel Meurice. Jubilant crowds greeted the French forces, and de Gaulle led a renowned victory parade through the city.

On 15 August 1944 and in the following days, during Operation Dragoon, 230,000 Free French soldiers under général de Lattre de Tassigny took part in the invasion of southern France alongside American troops, in order to secure the vital ports on the French Mediterranean coast and increase pressure on the German forces by opening another front. Hindered by Allied air supremacy and a large-scale uprising by the French Resistance, the weak German forces were swiftly defeated and southern France liberated by Free French and American troops.

De Gaulle not only kept the patriotic resistance alive; he also did everything possible to re-establish the French claim to independence and sovereignty. As a leader, the American and British governments preferred the less popular, but less abrasively vindictive, General Giraud to de Gaulle, but for the French population de Gaulle was almost universally recognised as the true leader in their victory. These events forced Roosevelt to recognise, finally and fully, the provisional government installed in France by de Gaulle.

=== Communists ===
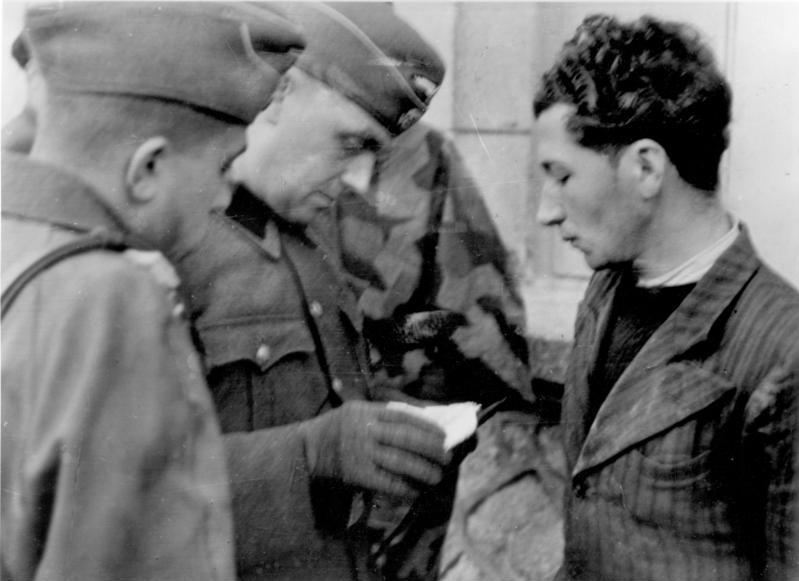
Communist prisoner in France, July 1944

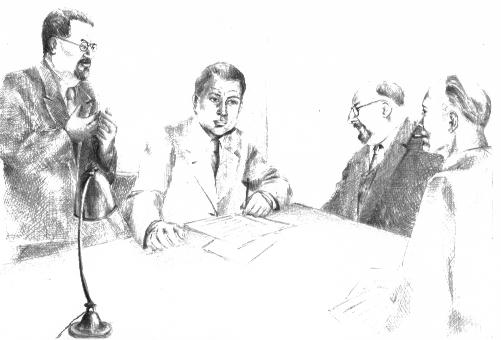
Artist's impression of a meeting of the PCF (Parti communiste français) central committee at Longjumeau, 1943. Left to right: Benoît Frachon, Auguste Lecoeur, Jacques Duclos and Charles Tillon.

After the signing of the Molotov–Ribbentrop Pact and the outbreak of World War II in 1939, the French Communist Party (PCF) was declared a proscribed organisation by Édouard Daladier's government. Many of its leaders were arrested and imprisoned or forced to go underground. The PCF adopted an antiwar position on orders of the Comintern in Moscow, which remained in place for the first year of the German occupation, reflecting the September 1939 nonaggression pact between Germany and the USSR. Conflicts erupted within the party, as many of its members opposed collaboration with the Germans while others toed the party line of neutrality as directed by Stalin in Moscow. On Armistice Day, November 11, 1940, communists were among the university students demonstrating against German repression by marching along the Champs-Élysées. It was only when Germany invaded the Soviet Union in 1941 that French communists actively began to organize a resistance effort. They benefited from their experience in clandestine operations during the Spanish Civil War.

On 21 August 1941, Colonel Pierre-Georges Fabien committed the first overt violent act of communist resistance by assassinating a German officer at the Barbès-Rochechouart station of the Paris Métro. The attack, and others perpetrated in the following weeks, provoked fierce reprisals, culminating in the execution of 98 hostages after the Feldkommandant of Nantes was shot on 20 October.

The military strength of the communists was still relatively feeble at the end of 1941, but the rapid growth of the Francs-Tireurs et Partisans (FTP), a radical armed movement, ensured that French communists regained their reputation as an effective anti-fascist force. The FTP was open to non-communists but operated under communist control, with its members predominantly engaged in acts of sabotage and guerrilla warfare. By 1944, the FTP had an estimated strength of 100,000 men.

Towards the end of the occupation the PCF reached the height of its influence, controlling large areas of France through the Resistance units under its command. Some in the PCF wanted to launch a revolution as the Germans withdrew from the country, but the leadership, acting on Stalin's instructions, opposed this and adopted a policy of cooperating with the Allied powers and advocating a new Popular Front government.

During the Nazi occupation of France, the French Trotskyist group Parti Ouvrier Internationaliste printed the clandestine magazine Arbeiter und Soldat (Worker and Soldier) for German troops. The publication opposed both fascism and western imperialism, and 12 issues were distributed from July 1943 through July 1944.

Many well-known intellectual and artistic figures were attracted to the Communist party during the war, including the artist Pablo Picasso and the writer and philosopher Jean-Paul Sartre. Philosophers Georges Politzer and Valentin Feldman and writer Jacques Decour were among others. After the German invasion of the USSR, many Russian white émigrés, inspired by Russian patriotic sentiment, would support the Soviet war effort. A number of them formed the Union of Russian Patriots, which adopted pro-Soviet positions and collaborated closely with the French Communist Party.

=== Socialists ===
At the end of the summer of 1940, Daniel Mayer was asked by Leon Blum to reconstitute the SFIO (in ruins because of Paul Faure's defection to the Vichy régime). In March 1941 Daniel Mayer created, with other socialists like Suzanne Buisson and Félix Gouin, the Comité d'action socialiste (CAS) in Nîmes. The same thing was created by Jean-Baptiste Lebas in the Nord-Pas-de-Calais (administratively joined with Belgium) in January 1941, along the lines of a prior network created in September 1940.

In 1942, Le Populaire, newspaper of the SFIO from 1921 to 1940, was publishing again, clandestinely. The same year, André Philip became commissaire national à l'Intérieur of the Free French (France libre), and Félix Gouin joined Charles de Gaulle in London to represent the socialists. In Algeria, left-wing networks of resistance were already formed. As the Riom trial began in 1942, the fervour and the number of socialists in the Resistance grew. The CAS-Sud became the secret SFIO in March 1943.

There was a majority from the SFIO in Libération-Nord, one of the eight great networks to make up the National Council of the Resistance, and in the Brutus network. Socialists were also important in the organisation civile et militaire (OCM) and in Libération-Sud.

Other socialist leaders in the Resistance included Pierre Brossolette, Gaston Defferre, Jean Biondi, Jules Moch, Jean Pierre-Bloch, Tanguy-Prigent, Guy Mollet and Christian Pineau. François Camel and Marx Dormoy were assassinated, while Jean-Baptiste Lebas, Isidore Thivrier, Amédée Dunois, Claude Jordery and Augustin Malroux died during their deportation.

=== Vichy nationalists ===
Before the war, there were several ultrarightist organisations in France. Another among the most influential factions of the right was Croix-de-Feu (Cross of Fire), which gradually moderated its positions during the early years of the war and grew increasingly popular among the aging veterans of the First World War.

Despite some differences in their positions on certain issues, these organizations were united in their opposition to parliamentarism, a stance that had led them to participate in demonstrations, most notably the "political disturbance" riots of 6 February 1934. At about the same time, La Cagoule, a fascist paramilitary organisation, launched various actions aimed at destabilising the Third Republic. These efforts continued until La Cagoule was infiltrated and dismantled in 1937. Thousands not only welcomed the Vichy régime, but collaborated with it to one degree or another. But the powerful appeal of French nationalism drove others to engage in resistance against occupying German forces.

In 1942, after an ambiguous period of collaboration, the former leader of Croix de Feu, François de La Rocque, founded the Klan Network, which provided information to the British intelligence services. Georges Loustaunau-Lacau and Marie-Madeleine Fourcade—who had both supported La Cagoule—founded the Alliance network, and Colonel Georges Groussard of the Vichy secret services founded the Gilbert network. Some members of Action Française engaged in the Resistance with similar nationalistic motives. Some prominent examples are Daniel Cordier, who became Jean Moulin's secretary, and Colonel Rémy, who founded the Confrérie Notre-Dame. These groups also included Pierre de Bénouville, who, together with Henri Frenay, led the Combat group, and Jacques Renouvin, who founded the group of resisters known as Liberté.

Sometimes contact with others in the Resistance led some operatives to adopt new political philosophies. Many gradually moved away from their antisemitic prejudices and their hatred of "démocrassouille", 'dirty democracy' (which many equated with mob rule), or simply away from their traditional grass-roots conservatism. Bénouville and Marie-Madeleine Fourcade became députés in the French parliament after the war; François Mitterrand moved towards the left, joined the Resistance and eventually became the first socialist president of the Fifth Republic, Henri Frenay evolved towards European socialism, and Daniel Cordier, whose family had supported Charles Maurras for three generations, abandoned his views in favor of the ideology of the republican Jean Moulin.

The historian Jean-Pierre Azéma coined the term vichysto-résistant to describe those who at first supported the Vichy régime (mostly based on the patriotic image of Pétain rather than the Révolution Nationale) but later joined the Resistance. The founder of Ceux de la Libération ("Those of the Liberation"), Maurice Ripoche, initially defended Vichy but soon placed the liberation of France above all other goals and in 1941 opened his movement to leftists. In contrast, many extreme right-wing members of the Resistance, such as Gabriel Jeantet and Jacques Le Roy Ladurie, never renounced their tolerant attitudes towards Vichy.

==== Affiche Rouge ====
The Affiche Rouge (red placard) was a famous propaganda poster distributed by the Vichy French and German authorities in the spring of 1944 in occupied Paris. It was intended to discredit a group of 23 Franc-Tireurs known as the "Manouchian group". After its members were arrested, tortured and publicly tried, they were executed by firing squad in Fort Mont-Valérien on 21 February 1944. The poster emphasised the composition of the group's membership, many of whom were Jews and communists, to discredit the Resistance as not "French" enough in its fundamental allegiance and motivations.

=== Jews ===
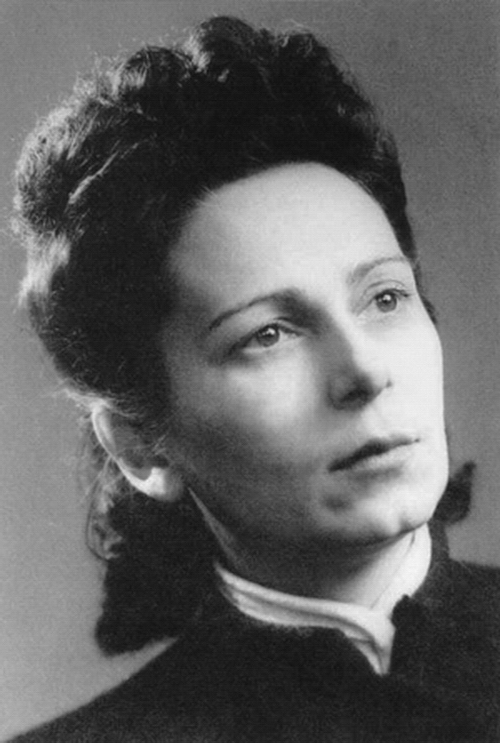
Ariadna Scriabina, (daughter of Russian composer Alexander Scriabin), co-founded the Armée Juive and was killed by the pro-Nazi milice in 1944. She was posthumously awarded the Croix de guerre and Médaille de la Resistance.

The Vichy régime had legal authority in both the north of France, which was occupied by the German Wehrmacht; and the southern "free zone", where the régime's administrative center, Vichy, was located. Vichy voluntarily and willfully collaborated with Nazi Germany and adopted a policy of persecution towards Jews, demonstrated by the passage of antisemitic legislation as early as October 1940. The law on the status of Jews, which legally redefined French Jews as a non-French underclass, deprived them of citizenship. According to Philippe Pétain's chief of staff, "Germany was not at the origin of the anti-Jewish legislation of Vichy. That legislation was spontaneous and autonomous." The laws led to confiscations of property, arrests, and deportations to concentration camps. As a result of the fate promised them by Vichy and the Germans, Jews were over-represented at all levels of the French Resistance. Studies show that although Jews in France constituted only one percent of the French population, they comprised ≈15–20 percent of the Resistance. Among these were many Jewish émigrés, such as Hungarian artists and writers.

The Jewish youth movement Eclaireuses et Eclaireurs israélites de France (EEIF), equivalent to Boy Scouts and Girl Scouts in other countries, had, during the early years of the occupation, shown support for the traditional values of the Vichy régime, until it was banned in 1943, after which its older members soon formed armed resistance units.

A militant Jewish Zionist resistance organisation, the Jewish Army (Armée Juive), was founded in 1942. It was established and led by Abraham Polonski, Eugénie Polonski, Lucien Lublin, David Knout and Ariadna Scriabina (daughter of the Russian composer Alexander Scriabin). They continued armed resistance under a Zionist flag until liberation finally arrived. The Armée juive organised escape routes across the Pyrenées to Spain and smuggled about 300 Jews out of the country during 1943–1944. They distributed millions of dollars from the American Joint Distribution Committee to relief organisations and fighting units within France. In 1944, the EIF and the Jewish Army combined to form the Organisation Juive de Combat (OJC). The OJC had four hundred members by the summer of 1944, and participated in the liberations of Paris, Lyon, Toulouse, Grenoble and Nice.

In the southern occupation zone, the Œuvre de Secours aux Enfants (roughly, Children's Relief Effort), a French-Jewish humanitarian organisation commonly called OSE, saved the lives of between 7,000 and 9,000 Jewish children by forging papers, smuggling them into neutral countries and sheltering them in orphanages, schools, and convents.

=== Armenians ===
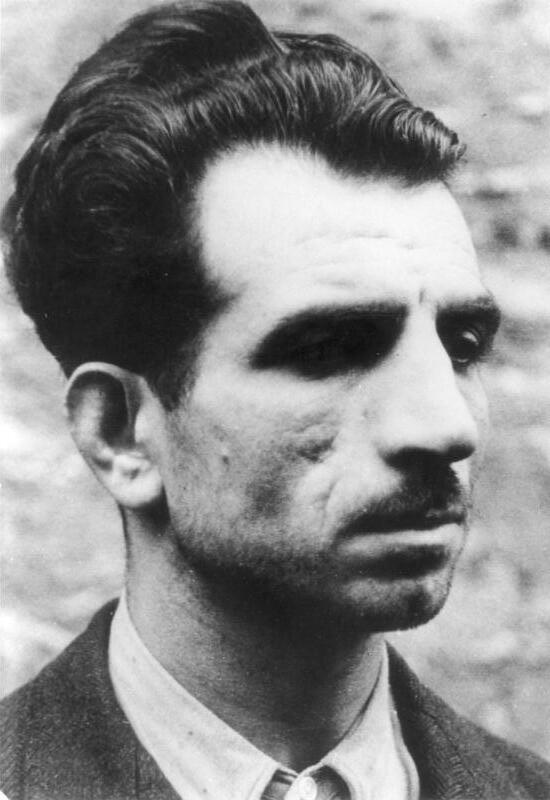
Missak Manouchian portrait on the Affiche Rouge, arrested and were shot near Paris on 21 February 1944. considered a hero of the French Resistance.

The Armenian community of France played an active role in the Resistance. Armenian poet and communist Missak Manouchian became one of the leaders of the French Resistance and commander of the Manouchian Group (the family of Charles Aznavour had supported Missak and his wife Meliné when they were in hiding). Arpen Tavitian, another executed member of the Manouchian group, industrialist Napoléon Bullukian (1905–1984), poets Kégham Atmadjian (1910–1940) and Rouben Melik were other famous participants in the French Resistance. The Anti-Fascist Underground Patriotic Organization was also commanded by Armenian officers. Armenian-French writer Louise Aslanian (1906–1945), another French Resistance activist, was arrested along with her husband Arpiar Aslanian on July 24, 1944, taken to the Nazi concentration camps by Nazis and killed in 1945. Many of Louise's manuscripts and diaries were confiscated and destroyed by Nazis. Resisters Alexander Kazarian and Bardukh Petrosian were awarded by the highest military orders of France by General Charles de Gaulle. Henri Karayan (1921–2011), a member of the Manouchian Group, participated in illegal distribution of L'Humanité in Paris and was engaged in armed struggle until the Libération. In 2012, 95-year-old Arsene Tchakarian, the last survivor of the Manouchian resistance group who fought against occupying Nazi German forces during the Second World War, was decorated as Officer of the Legion of Honour by the president of France.

=== Georgians ===
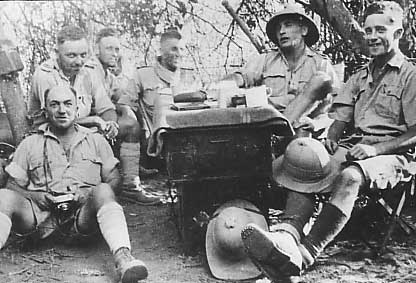
Dimitri Amilakhvari with Free France legionnaires in French Morocco, 1941

Georgians living in France and the French colonies and people of Georgian ethnicity played an active and symbolic role in the French resistance. One of the most renowned figures of the Free French Forces was Prince Dimitri Amilakhvari, who participated in every important operation that involved French forces until 1942 and led the Légion étrangère into battle in the Norwegian and later African campaigns against Erwin Rommel's Africa Corps. Under General Koenig, he and his heavily outnumbered troops committed daring raids, dealing decisive losses to the Germans at the Battle of Bir Hakeim. During the battle he is said to have written: "We, foreigners, have only one way to prove to France our gratitude: to be killed ..." General de Gaulle personally awarded Amilakhvari the Order of Liberation and posthumously named him and his men the honour of France. He was also known by the French populace as "Bazorka". The lieutenant colonel was one of the 66 French recipients of the Norwegian War Cross and was also posthumously awarded the Legion of Honour. He led his troops by example and died in combat during the Second Battle of El Alamein in October 1942. Another known resistance fighter was Beglar Samkharadze, a captured Soviet soldier who was transferred to France where he escaped and joined the Resistance. Upon return to his homeland, he was imprisoned by Soviet authorities on charges of high treason, but two commanders of the French Resistance testified to his commitment in the fight against Nazi Germany.

=== Women ===
"Nicole Minet", a French Partisan who captured 25 Nazis in the Chartres area (August 1944).

Although inequalities persisted under the Third Republic, the cultural changes that followed the First World War allowed differences in the treatment of men and women in France to narrow gradually, with some women assuming political responsibilities as early as the 1930s. The defeat of France in 1940 and the appointment of the Vichy régime's conservative leader, Philippe Pétain, undermined feminism, and France began a restructuring of society based on the "femme au foyer" or "women at home" imperative. On at least one occasion, Pétain spoke out to French mothers about their patriotic duty:

Mothers of France, our native land, yours is the most difficult task but also the most gratifying. You are, even before the state, the true educators. You alone know how to inspire in all [our youth] the inclination for work, the sense of discipline, the modesty, the respect, that give men character and make nations strong.

Despite opposing the collaborationist régime, the French Resistance generally sympathised with its antifeminism and did not encourage the participation of women in war and politics, following, in the words of historian Henri Noguères, "a notion of inequality between the sexes as old as our civilisation and as firmly implanted in the Resistance as it was elsewhere in France". Consequently, women in the Resistance were less numerous than men and averaged only 11% of the members in the formal networks and movements.

Madeleine Riffaud recalled, as a 19-year-old courier for the FTP, "cross at being told always to carry weapons across town for the men to use". She secured permission to use a gun herself, and 23 July 1944, in broad daylight on a bridge overlooking the river Seine, shot a lone German NCO. After being arrested, and tortured unsuccessfully for her contacts, she was released in a prisoner exchange (negotiated by the Swedish consul Raoul Nordling) and she returned immediately to the struggle. On 23 August, she commanded an FTP operation that trapped a train in the Buttes-Chaumont tunnel and secured the surrender of the 80 German soldiers aboard. On the 25th, she also took part in an attack on the barracks on Place de la République. Yet, after the Liberation of Paris, she was unable to finish the war with the rest of her resistance group, now part of the regular French army. At a time when women in France did not yet have the right to vote, she was told that she did not have her father's permission.

Some the women involved in the Resistance did assume prominent roles. Intellectuals like Germaine Tillion and Suzanne Hiltermann-Souloumiac, highly aware of the signification of Nazism and collaboration, were among the few early resistants. Suzanne Hiltermann-Souloumiac played an important role in the Dutch-Paris movement, specialised in rescuing Allied pilots. Lucie Aubrac, the iconic resister and co-founder of Libération-Sud, was never assigned a specific role in the hierarchy of the movement. Hélène Viannay, one of the founders of Défense de la France and married to a man who shared her political views, was never permitted to express her opinions in the underground newspaper, and her husband took two years to arrive at political conclusions she had held for many years.

Marie-Madeleine Fourcade, the only major female leader in the Resistance, headed the Alliance network. The Organisation Civile et Militaire had a female wing headed by Marie-Hélène Lefaucheux, who took part in setting up the Œuvre de Sainte-Foy to assist prisoners in French jails and German concentration camps. But no women were chosen to lead any of the eight major Resistance movements. After the liberation of France, the provisional government appointed no women ministers or commissaires de la République. However, as head of the Provisional Government of the French Republic, general de Gaulle, as a recognition of and a reward for their role in the Resistance, granted women the right to vote in 1945.

== Terminology ==
Charles de Gaulle spoke of "French resistance" in his broadcast on 18 June 1940. English-language use of the phrase "the Resistance" in reference to French anti-Axis activity dates back to at least 1944. Boris Kovalyov has stated that the Resistance movement in France and its name originated among White Movement Russian émigrés. The Russian Boris Vildé co-founded one of the first anti-occupation groups, and in December 1940 started co-publishing the underground newspaper Résistance.

== Networks and movements ==
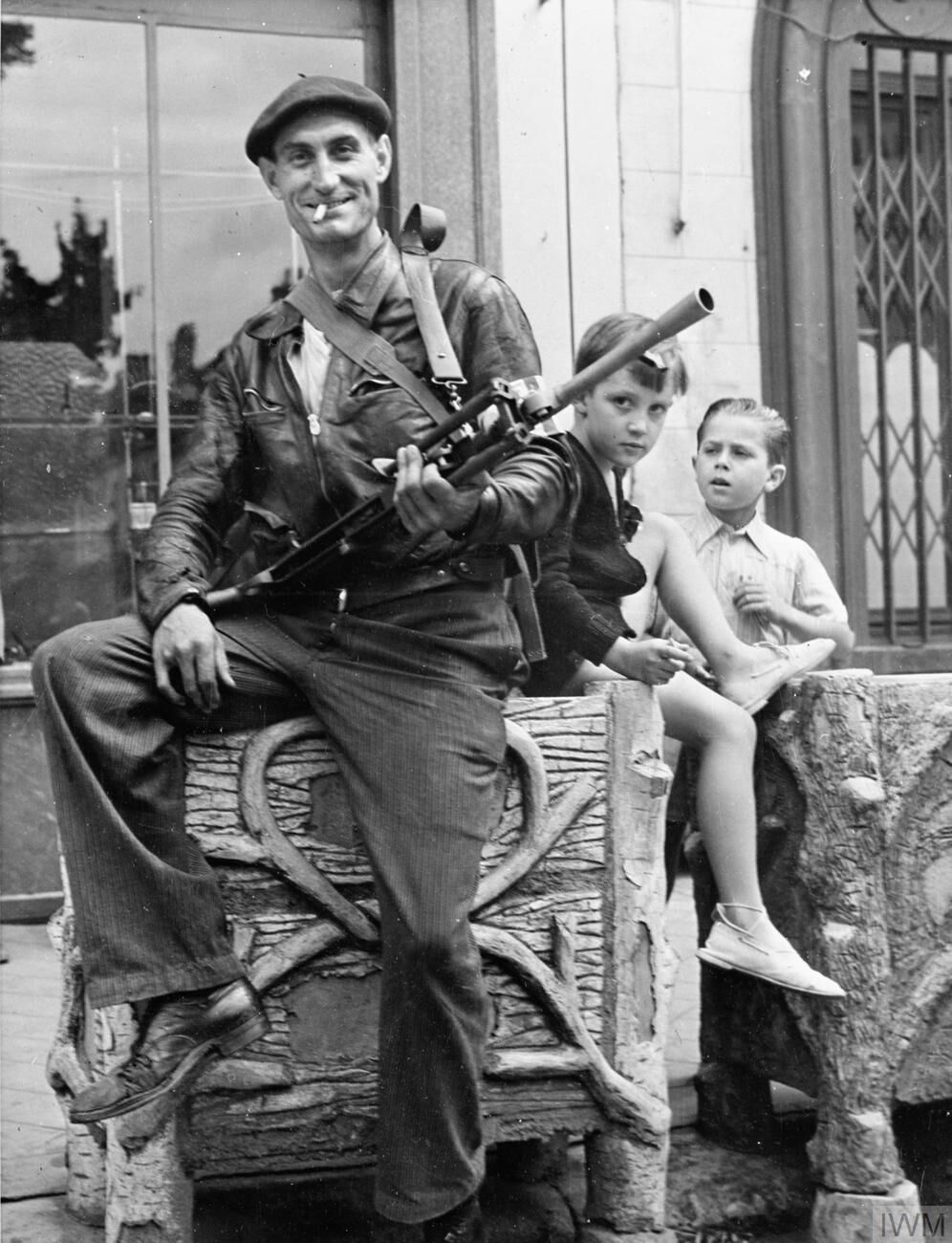
A volunteer of the French Resistance interior force (FFI) at Châteaudun in 1944.

In this context, it is customary to distinguish the various organisations of the French Resistance as movements or networks. A Resistance network was an organisation created for a specific military purpose, usually intelligence-gathering, sabotage or aiding Allied air crews who had been shot down behind enemy lines. A Resistance movement, on the other hand, was focused on educating and organizing the population, i.e., "to raise awareness and organise the people as broadly as possible."

=== BCRA networks ===
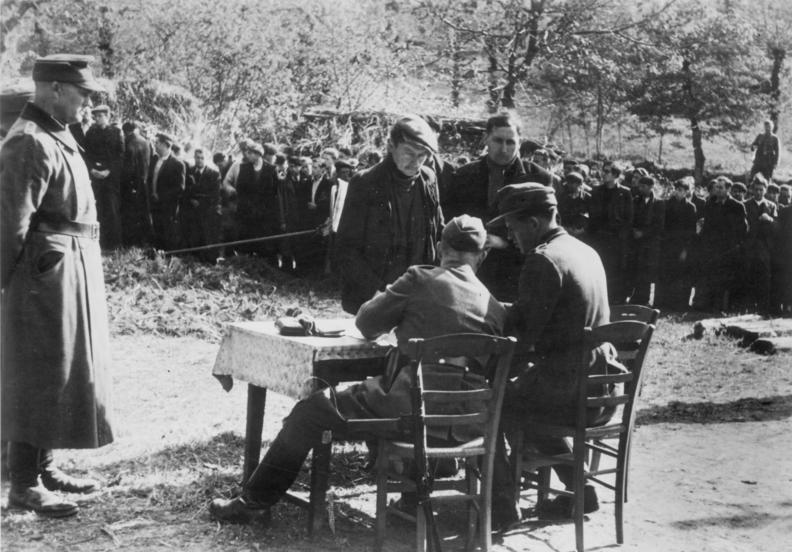
German military and résistants, in Brittany, July, 1944.

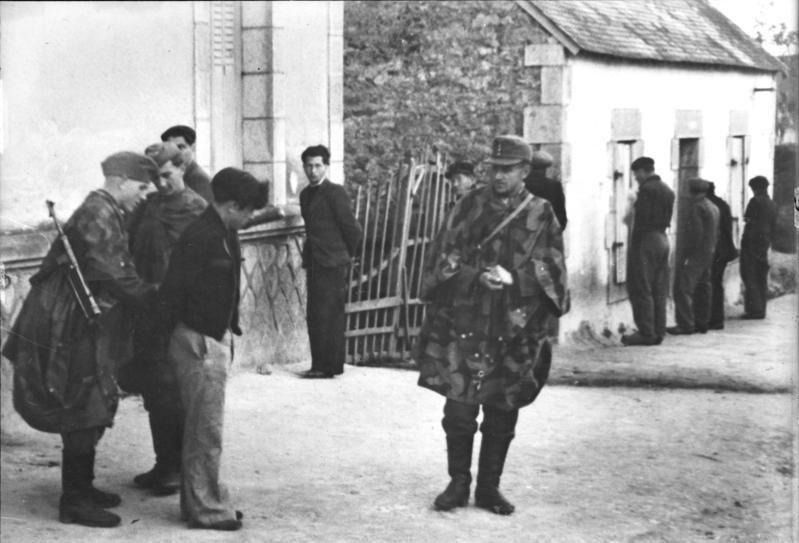
German military and résistants, July, 1944.

In July 1940, after the defeat of the French armies and the consequent armistice with Germany, British prime minister Winston Churchill asked the Free French government-in-exile (headed by General Charles de Gaulle) to set up a secret service agency in occupied France to counter the threat of a German operation code-named Operation Sea Lion, the expected cross-channel invasion of Britain. Colonel André Dewavrin (also known as Colonel Passy), who had previously worked for France's military intelligence service, the Deuxième Bureau, took on the responsibility for creating such a network. Its principal goal was to inform London of German military operations on the Atlantic coast and in the English Channel. The spy network was called the Bureau Central de Renseignements et d'Action (BCRA), and its actions were carried out by volunteers who were parachuted into France to create and nourish local Resistance cells.

Of the nearly 2,000 volunteers who were active by the end of the war, one of the most effective and well-known was the agent Gilbert Renault, who was awarded the Ordre de la Libération and later the Legion of Honour for his deeds. Known mainly by the pseudonym Colonel Rémy, he returned to France in August 1940 not long after the surrender of France, where the following November he organised one of the most active and important Resistance networks of the BCRA, the Confrérie de Notre Dame (Brotherhood of Our Lady), which provided the Allies with photographs, maps and important information on German defenses in general and the Atlantic Wall in particular. From 1941 on, networks such as these allowed the BCRA to send armed paratroopers, weapons and radio equipment into France to carry out missions.

Another important BCRA operative, Henri Honoré d'Estienne d'Orves, a naval officer, developed a 26-person network in France. He was betrayed, arrested in May 1941, and shot on 29 August 1941.

Christian Pineau, one of the founders of the Libération Nord movement, also had BCRA roots. During his trip to London in April 1942, the BCRA entrusted him with the creation of two new intelligence systems, Phalanx and Cohors-Asturies. Both networks proved vital later in the war.

Mouvements Unis de la Résistance (Unified Movements of the Resistance, MUR) was a French Resistance organisation resulting from the regrouping of three major Resistance movements ("Combat", "Franc-Tireur" and "Libération-Sud") in January 1943. Later that year, the BCRA and the United Movements of Resistance merged their intelligence networks.

Another BCRA appendage was called Gallia, a fact-gathering network specializing in military intelligence and police activities. Its importance increased throughout the second half of 1943 and into the spring of 1944. It eventually became the largest BCRA network in the Vichy zone, employing about 2,500 sources, contacts, couriers and analysts. Gallia's work did not stop after the 1944 landings in Normandy and Provence; it provided information to the Allies that allowed for the bombing of the retreating German armies' military targets.

=== Foreigners in the Resistance ===
==== Dutch ====
Dutch-Paris built an important network in France to help the resistance, Jews and allied pilots to cross the Pyrenees and flee to Britain. 800 Jews and 142 pilots were saved. Near the end of the war, because of a denunciation, nearly all members of the network were caught and deported to concentration camps, where many died.

==== Armenians ====
Armenians living in France took up arms and fought the resistance against the Axis forces. The most significant Armenian resistant were 23 strong men led by Missak Manouchian, who were hanged on February 21, 1944.

==== Spanish maquis ====
Following their defeat in the Spanish Civil War in early 1939, about half a million Spanish Republicans fled to France to escape imprisonment or execution. On the north side of the Pyrenees, such refugees were confined in internment camps such as Camp Gurs and Camp Vernet. Although over half of these had been repatriated to Spain (or elsewhere) by the time Pétain proclaimed the Vichy régime in 1940, the 120,000 to 150,000 who remained became political prisoners, and the foreign equivalent to the Service du Travail Obligatoire, the Compagnies de Travailleurs Étrangers (Companies of Foreign Workers) or CTE, began to pursue them for slave labor. The CTE was initially seen as a welcome break from the monotony of the camps by many. Lluís Montagut, a member of the C.T.E, described how "we (the Spanish Republican internees) held so much desire not to see the camps that we accepted (the positions offered by the C.T.E) without the slightest objection...we went out of the way to lose the shameful tag of undesirables".

The CTE permitted prisoners to leave the internment camps if they agreed to work in German factories, but as many as 60,000 Republicans recruited for the labor service managed to escape and join the French Resistance. Thousands of suspected anti-fascist Republicans were deported to German concentration camps instead, however. Most were sent to Mauthausen where, of the 10,000 Spaniards registered, only 2,000 survived the war.

Many Spanish escapees joined French Resistance groups; others formed their own autonomous groups which became known as the Spanish maquis. In April 1942, Spanish communists formed an organisation called the XIV Corps, an armed guerrilla movement of about 3,400 combatants by June 1944. Although the group first worked closely with the Francs-Tireurs et Partisans (FTP), it re-formed as the Agrupación de Guerrilleros Españoles (Spanish Guerrilla Group, AGE) in May 1944. The name change was intended to convey the group's composition: Spanish soldiers ultimately advocating the fall of General Francisco Franco. After the German Army had been driven from France, the Spanish maquis refocused on Spain.

==== Czechs and Slovaks ====
Among Czechs and Slovaks who joined the French Resistance were Otakar Hromádko, Věra Waldes and Artur London.

==== German anti-nazis ====
From spring 1943, German and Austrian anti-nazis who had fought in the International Brigades during the Spanish Civil War fought in Lozère and the Cévennes alongside the French Resistance in the Francs-Tireurs et Partisans. During the first years of the occupation, they had been employed in the CTE, but following the German invasion of the southern zone in 1942 the threat increased, and many joined the maquis. They were led by militant German communist Otto Kühne, a former member of the Reichstag in the Weimar Republic who had over 2,000 Germans in the FTP under his command by July 1944. He fought the Nazis directly, as in an April 1944 battle in Saint-Étienne-Vallée-Française in which his soldiers destroyed a Feldgendarmerie unit, or in an ambush of the Waffen-SS on June 5, 1944.

==== Luxembourgers ====
400 men from Luxembourg (which was annexed into Germany), many of whom had refused to serve in, or who had deserted from, the German Wehrmacht, left their tiny country to fight in the French maquis, where they were particularly active in the regions of Lyon, Grenoble and the Ardennes although many of them were killed in the war. Others, like Antoine Diederich, rose to high rank in the Resistance. Diederich, known only as "Capitaine Baptiste", had 77 maquis soldiers under his command and is best known for attacking Riom prison, where he and his fighters freed every one of 114 inmates who had been sentenced to death.

==== Hungarians ====
Many Hungarian émigrés, some of them Jewish, were artists and writers working in Paris at the time of the occupation. They had gone to Paris in the 1920s and 1930s to escape repression in their homeland. Many joined the Resistance, where they were particularly active in the regions of Lyon, Grenoble, Marseille and Toulouse. Jewish resisters included Imre Epstein in the Hungarian group at Toulouse; György Vadnai (future Lausanne rabbi) at Lyon; the writer Emil Szittya at Limoges. Also participating were the painter Sándor Józsa, the sculptor István Hajdú (Étienne Hajdu), the journalists László Kőrös and Imre Gyomrai; the photographers Andor (André) Steiner, Lucien Hervé and Ervin Martón. Thomas Elek (1924–1944), Imre Glasz (1902–1944) and József Boczor (1905–1944) were among 23 resisters executed for their work with the legendary Manouchian Group. The Germans executed nearly 1,100 Jewish resisters of different nationalities during the occupation, while others were killed in action.

==== Italian anti-fascists ====
On 3 March 1943, representatives of the Italian Communist Party and Italian Socialist Party who had taken refuge in France, signed the "Pact of Lyon" which marked the beginning of their participation in the Resistance. Italians were particularly numerous in the Hitler-annexed Moselle industrial area, where they played a determining role in the creation of the Département's main resistance organisation, Groupe Mario. Vittorio Culpo is an example of Italians in the French Resistance.

==== Polish resistance in France during World War II ====
The majority of the Polish soldiers, and some Polish civilians, who stayed in France after the German victory in 1940, as well as one Polish pilot shot down over France (one of many Polish pilots flying for the RAF), joined the French Resistance, notably including Tony Halik and Aleksander Kawałkowski.

==== Cajun Americans ====
While not part of the French Resistance, French-speaking Cajun soldiers in the United States military posed as local civilians in France to channel American assistance to the Resistance.

=== Beginnings of a coordinated resistance ===
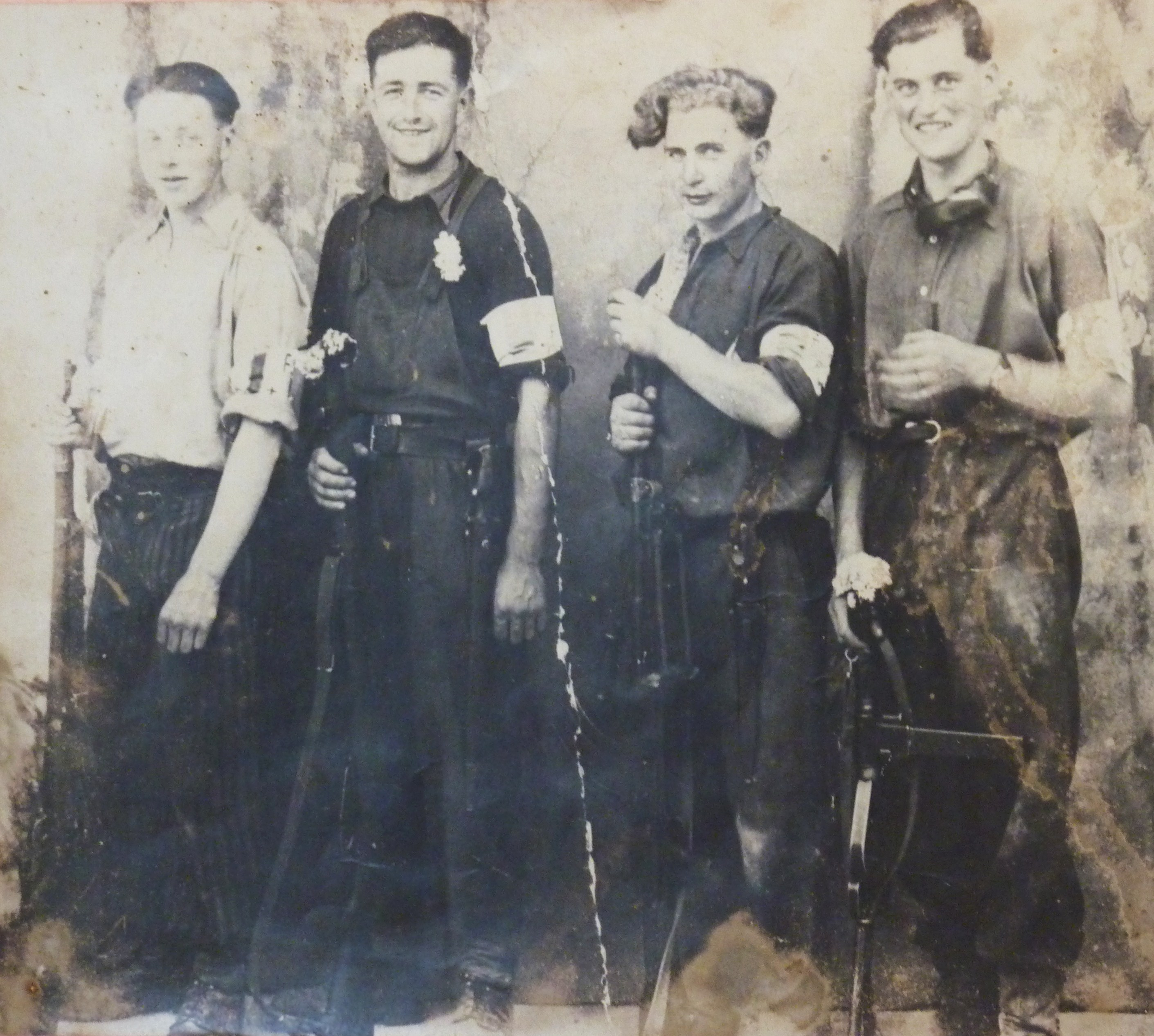
Resistants from Huelgoat.

From 1940 to 1942, the first years of the German occupation of France, there was no systematically organised Resistance capable of coordinated fighting throughout France. Active opposition to the German and Vichy authorities was sporadic and carried out only by a tiny and fragmented set of operatives. Most French men and women put their faith in the Vichy government and its figurehead, Marshal Pétain, who continued to be widely regarded as the "savior" of France, opinions which persisted until their unpopular policies, and their collaboration with the foreign occupiers, became broadly apparent.

The earliest Resistance organisations had no contact with the western Allies and received no material aid from London or anywhere else. Consequently, most focused on generating nationalist propaganda through the distribution of underground newspapers. Many of the major movements, such as Défense de la France, were primarily engaged in publishing and distributing their newspapers. Even after they became more intensively activist, propaganda and the cultivation of positive morale remained, until the very end of the war, their most important concerns.

Early acts of violent resistance were often motivated more by instinct and fighting spirit than by any formal ideology, but later several distinct political alignments and visions of post-liberation France developed among the Resistance organisations. These differences sometimes resulted in conflicts, but the differences among Resistance factions were usually papered over by their shared opposition to Vichy and the Germans; and over time, the various elements of the Resistance began to unite.

Many of the networks recruited and controlled by the British and Americans were not perceived by the French as particularly interested in establishing a united or integrated Resistance operation, and the guerrilla groups controlled by the communists were only slightly more attracted by the idea of joining of a Resistance "umbrella" organisation. Nonetheless, a contact between de Gaulle's envoys and the communists was established at the end of 1942. The liberation of Corsica in September 1943, a clear demonstration of the strength of communist insurgency, was accomplished by the FTP, an effective force not yet integrated into the Secret Army and not involved with General Henri Giraud, the Free French or the political unification of the Resistance.

The French Resistance began to unify in 1941. This was evidenced by the formation of movements in the Vichy zone centred on such figures as Henri Frenay (Combat), Emmanuel d'Astier de La Vigerie (Libération-Sud) and François de Menthon (Liberté), each of whom was, independently, an agent of the Free French. Formal consolidation was accomplished through the intervention of Jean Moulin.

Prefect of Eure-et-Loir in 1939, Moulin was subsequently a part of the Air Ministry of Pierre Cot. In this context, he had forged a strong network of relationships in anti-fascist circles. Some time after November 1940, the idea of teaming up with his former colleague, Gaston Cusin, to identify and contact a number of potential Resistance "centres of influence" occurred to him; but only during the summer of 1941 was he able to make the most critical contacts, including contact with Henri Frenay, leader of the movement not yet called Combat but still known as the National Liberation Movement. He also established contact with de Menthon and Emmanuel d'Astier. In the report he wrote for de Gaulle, he spoke of these three movements and entertained the possibility of bringing them together under the acronym "LLL".

=== Maquis ===
The Maquis (French pronunciation: [maˈki]) were rural guerrilla bands of French Resistance fighters, called maquisards, during the Occupation of France in World War II. Initially, they were composed of men who had escaped into the mountains to avoid conscription into Vichy France's Service du travail obligatoire (STO) to provide forced labor for Nazi Germany. To avert capture and deportation to Germany, they became increasingly organized into non-active resistance groups.

=== Jean Moulin's intercession ===
The majority of resistance movements in France were unified after Moulin's formation of the Conseil National de la Résistance (CNR) in May 1943. CNR was coordinated with the Free French forces under the authority of French Generals Henri Giraud and Charles de Gaulle and their body, the Comité Français de Libération Nationale (CFLN).

== Activities ==
The 30 September 1943 issue of the Resistance newspaper, Défense de la France

=== Economic resistance ===
By June 1941, 81% of the miners employed by the national coal mining company, Charbonnages de France, were on strike, slowing deliveries of coal to German industrial plants supporting the war effort.

=== Clandestine press ===
The first action of many Resistance movements was the publication and distribution of clandestine press material. This was not the case with all movements, since some refused civil action and preferred armed resistance by groups such as CDLR and CDLL. Most clandestine newspapers were not consistent in their editorial stance and often consisted of only a single sheet, because the sale of all raw materials—paper, ink, stencils—was prohibited.

By 1942, however, about 300,000 copies of underground publications reached around two million readers. Resistance workers used friendly print-shop facilities at night. Staff risked the Germans noticing that a resistance newspaper used the same type face as officially sanctioned documents. Profession-specific newspapers also existed. Le Médecin Français advised doctors to immediately approve known collaborators for Service du travail obligatoire while medically disqualifying everyone else. La Terre advised farmers on how to send food to resistance members. Bulletin des Chemins de Fer encouraged railroad workers to sabotage German transportation. Unter Uns ("Among Us"), published in German for the occupiers, printed stories of German defeats on the Eastern Front.

In September 1940, Agnès Humbert and Jean Cassou, then employed at the Musée national des Arts et Traditions Populaires in Paris and finding they were to be replaced by German-approved staff, used a roneo machine belonging to the Museum to publish an open letter by Paul Rivet to Marshal Pétain. This was followed by their first tract, Vichy fait la guerre ("Vichy Wages War"), written by Cassou. At the end of 1940, a group of 10, including Humbert, Cassou, Marcel Abraham and Claude Aveline founded a clandestine newsletter called Résistance, respecting and supporting De Gaulle but circumspect in references to "that ridiculous old fool Pétain". It ran to five issues before the arrest of the editors in March 1940.

In the northern zone, Pantagruel, the newspaper of Franc-Tireur, had a circulation of 10,000 by June 1941 but was quickly replaced by Libération-Nord which attained a circulation of 50,000, and by January 1944 Défense de la France was distributing 450,000 copies. In the southern zone, François de Menthon's newspaper Liberté merged with Henri Frenay's Vérité to form Combat in December 1941, which grew to a circulation of 200,000 by 1944. During the same period Pantagruel brought out 37 issues, Libération-Sud 54 and Témoignage chrétien 15.

The underground press brought out books as well as newspapers through publishing houses, such as Les Éditions de Minuit (the Midnight Press), which had been set up to circumvent Vichy and German censorship. The 1942 novel Le Silence de la Mer ("The Silence of the Sea"), by Jean Bruller, quickly became a symbol of mental resistance through its story of how an old man and his niece refused to speak to the German officer occupying their house.

=== Intelligence ===
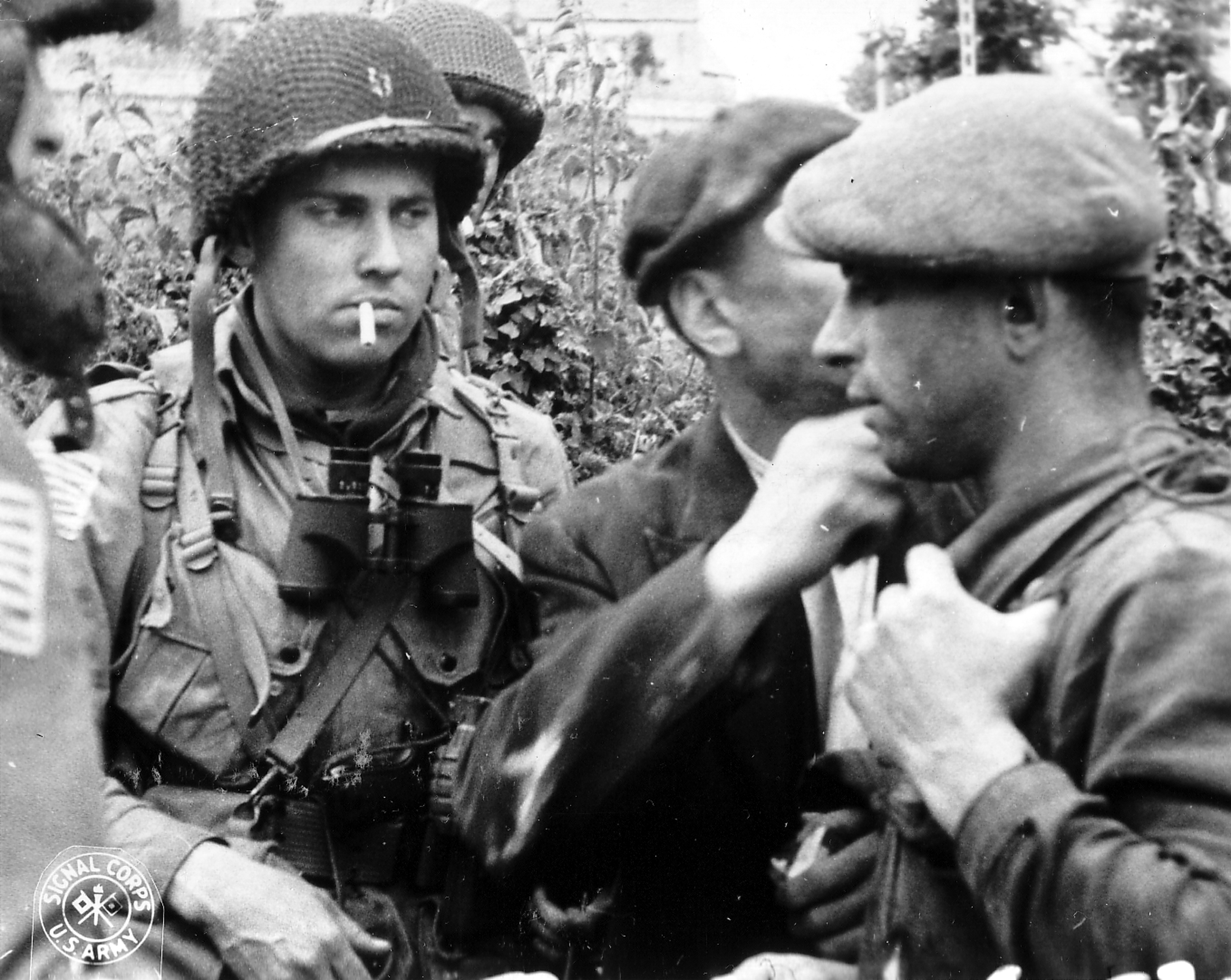
Francs-tireurs and Allied paratroopers reporting on the situation during the Battle of Normandy in 1944.

The intelligence networks were by far the most numerous and substantial of Resistance activities. They collected information of military value, such as coastal fortifications of the Atlantic Wall or Wehrmacht deployments. The BCRA and the different British intelligence services often competed with one another to gather the most valuable information from their Resistance networks in France.

The first agents of the Free French to arrive from Britain landed on the coast of Brittany as early as July 1940. They were Lieutenants Mansion, Saint-Jacques and Corvisart and Colonel Rémy, and didn't hesitate to get in touch with the anti-Germans within the Vichy military such as Georges Loustaunau-Lacau and Georges Groussard.

The various Resistance movements in France had to understand the value of intelligence networks in order to be recognized or receive subsidies from the BCRA or the British. The intelligence service of the Francs-Tireurs et Partisans was known by the code letters FANA and headed by Georges Beyer, the brother-in-law of Charles Tillon. Information from such services was often used as a bargaining chip to qualify for airdrops of weapons.

The transmission of information was first done by radio transmitter. Later, when air links by the Westland Lysander became more frequent, some information was also channeled through these couriers. By 1944, the BCRA was receiving 1,000 telegrams by radio every day and 2,000 plans every week. Many radio operators, called pianistes, were located by German goniometers. Their dangerous work gave them an average life expectancy of around six months. Even children partook in radio work (see Eddy Palacci). According to the historian Jean-François Muracciole, "Throughout the war, how to communicate remained the principal difficulty of intelligence networks. Not only were the operators few and inept, but their information was dangerous."

=== Sabotage ===
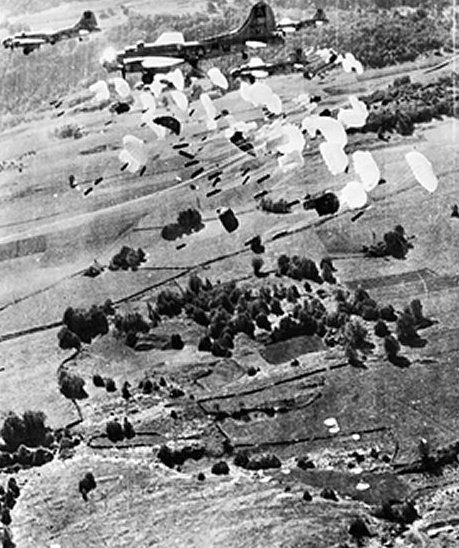
USAAF B-17 Flying Fortresses dropping supplies to the Maquis du Vercors in 1944.

Sabotage was a form of resistance adopted by groups who wanted to go beyond just distributing clandestine press publications. Many laboratories were set up to manufacture explosives. In August 1941, the Parisian chemist France Bloch-Sérazin assembled a small laboratory in her apartment to provide explosives to communist Resistance fighters. The lab also produced cyanide capsules to allow the fighters to evade torture if arrested. Indeed, she herself was arrested in February 1942, tortured, and deported to Hamburg where she was beheaded by guillotine in February 1943. In the southern occupation zone, Jacques Renouvin engaged in the same activities on behalf of groups of francs-tireurs.

Stealing dynamite from the Germans eventually took preference over handcrafting explosives. The British Special Operations Executive also parachuted tons of explosives to its agents in France for essential sabotage missions. The railways were a favorite target of saboteurs, who soon understood that removing bolts from the tracks was far more efficient than planting explosives.

Train-derailment strategies varied considerably in their effectiveness. The Germans managed to repair the tracks quickly in agricultural areas with level ground, since the salvage of some matériel was a relatively easy proposition in such terrain. But unbolting a connector plate on an outside rail in a mountainous area (given the higher speed of trains going downhill) could result in the derailment of an entire train with considerable amounts of front-ready matériel strewn far down the mountainside. Among the SNCF employees who joined the resistance, a subset were in Resistance-Fer which focused on reporting the movement of German troops to the Allied forces and sabotaging the railways' rolling stock as well as their infrastructure. Following the invasions of Normandy and Provence in 1944, the sabotage of rail transport became much more frequent and effectively prevented some German troop deployments to the front and hindered the subsequent retreat of German occupying forces.

Generally, the sabotage of equipment leaving armaments factories and derailment in areas where equipment could not readily be salvaged was a more discreet form of resistance, and probably at least as effective as bombing. Sabotage by resistants freed up vulnerable and expensive aircraft for other uses rather than risk heavy losses by attacking heavily defended targets. It was also preferred since it caused less collateral damage and fewer civilian casualties than Allied bombing.

=== Guerrilla warfare ===
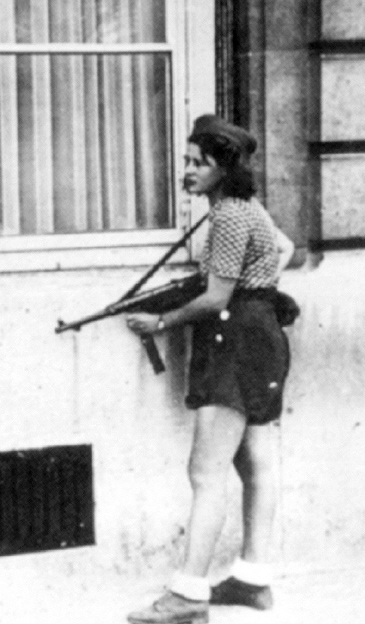
Simone Segouin in 1944

After the invasion of the Soviet Union in June 1941, communists engaged in guerrilla warfare, attacking German forces in French cities. In July 1942, the Allies' failure to open a second front resulted in a wave of communist guerrilla attacks aimed at maximizing the number of Germans deployed in the West to give the USSR military relief.

The assassinations that took place during summer and autumn 1941, starting with Colonel Pierre-Georges Fabien's shooting of a German officer in the Paris Métro, caused fierce reprisals and executions of hundreds of French hostages. As a result, the clandestine press was very discreet about the events and the communists soon decided to discontinue the assassinations.

From July to October 1943, groups in Paris engaging in attacks against occupying soldiers were better organized. Joseph Epstein was assigned responsibility for training Resistance fighters across the city, and his new commandos of fifteen men perpetrated a number of attacks that could not have been carried out before. The commandos were drawn from the foreign branch of the Francs-Tireurs et Partisans, and the most famous of them was the Manouchian Group.

== Role in the liberation of France and casualties ==
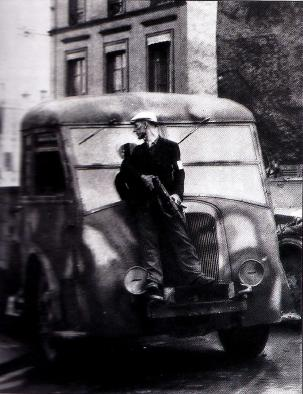
An FFI fighter

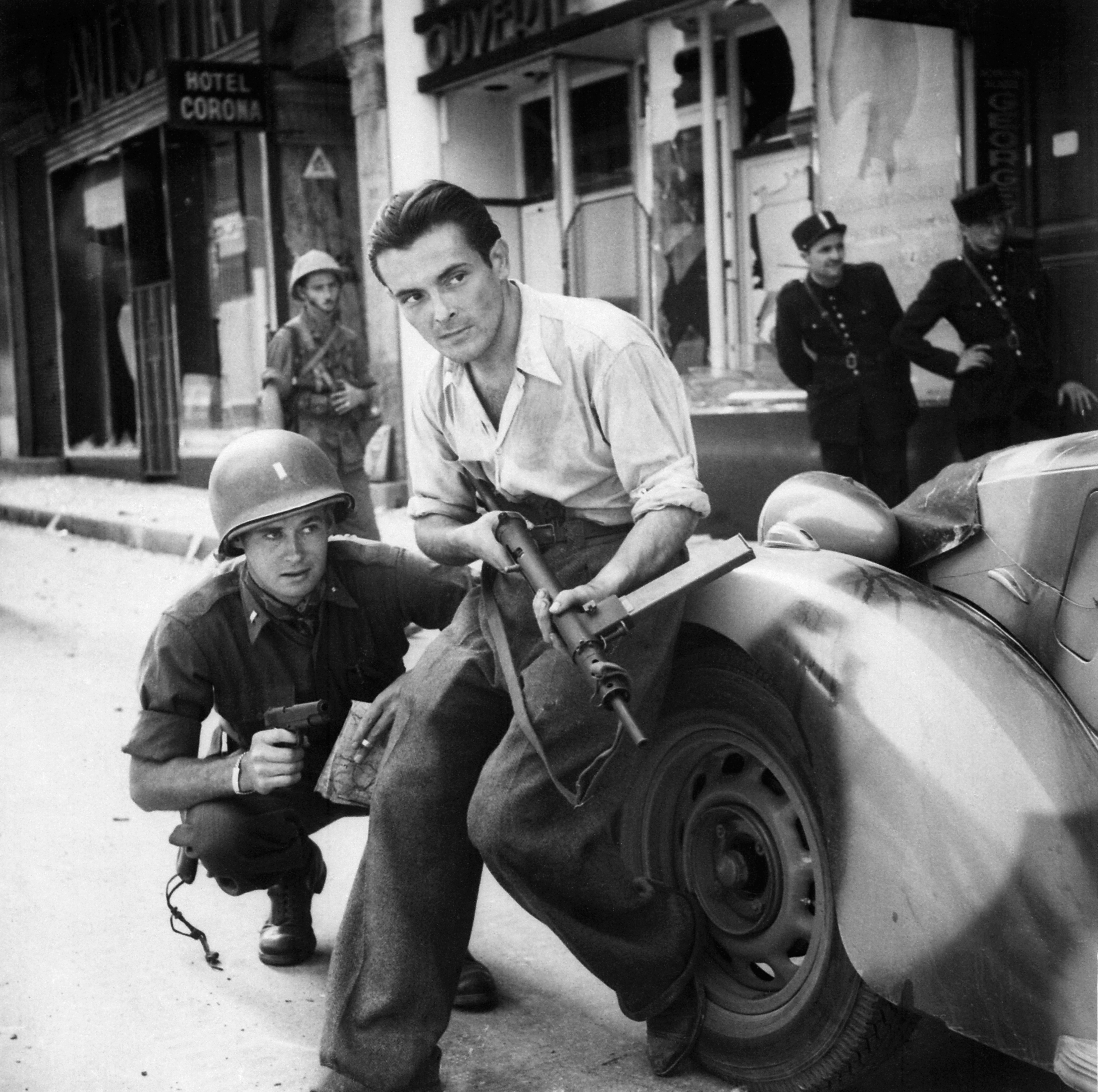
American officer and French partisan crouch behind a car during a street fight in a French city.

Defining the precise role of the French Resistance during the German occupation, or assessing its military importance alongside the Allied Forces during the liberation of France, is difficult. The two forms of resistance, active and passive, and the north–south occupational divide, allow for many interpretations, but what can broadly be agreed on is a synopsis of the events which took place.

Following the surrender of Fascist Italy in September 1943, a significant example of Resistance strength was displayed when the Corsican Resistance joined forces with the Free French to liberate the island from General Albert Kesselring's remaining German forces.

On mainland France itself, in the wake of the D-Day landings in Normandy in June 1944, the FFI and the communist fighting groups FTP, theoretically unified under the command of General Pierre Kœnig, fought alongside the Allies to free the rest of France. Several color-coded plans were co-ordinated for sabotage, most importantly Plan Vert (green) for railways, Plan Bleu (blue) for power installations and Plan Violet (purple) for telecommunications. To complement these missions, smaller plans were drafted: Plan Rouge (red) for German ammunition depots, Plan Jaune (yellow) for German command posts, Plan Noir (black) for German fuel depots and Plan Tortue (Tortoise) for road traffic. Their paralysis of German infrastructure is widely thought to have been very effective. British Prime Minister Winston Churchill later wrote in his memoirs praising the role the Resistance played in the liberation of Brittany, "The French Resistance Movement, which here numbered 30,000 men, played a notable part, and the peninsula was quickly overrun."

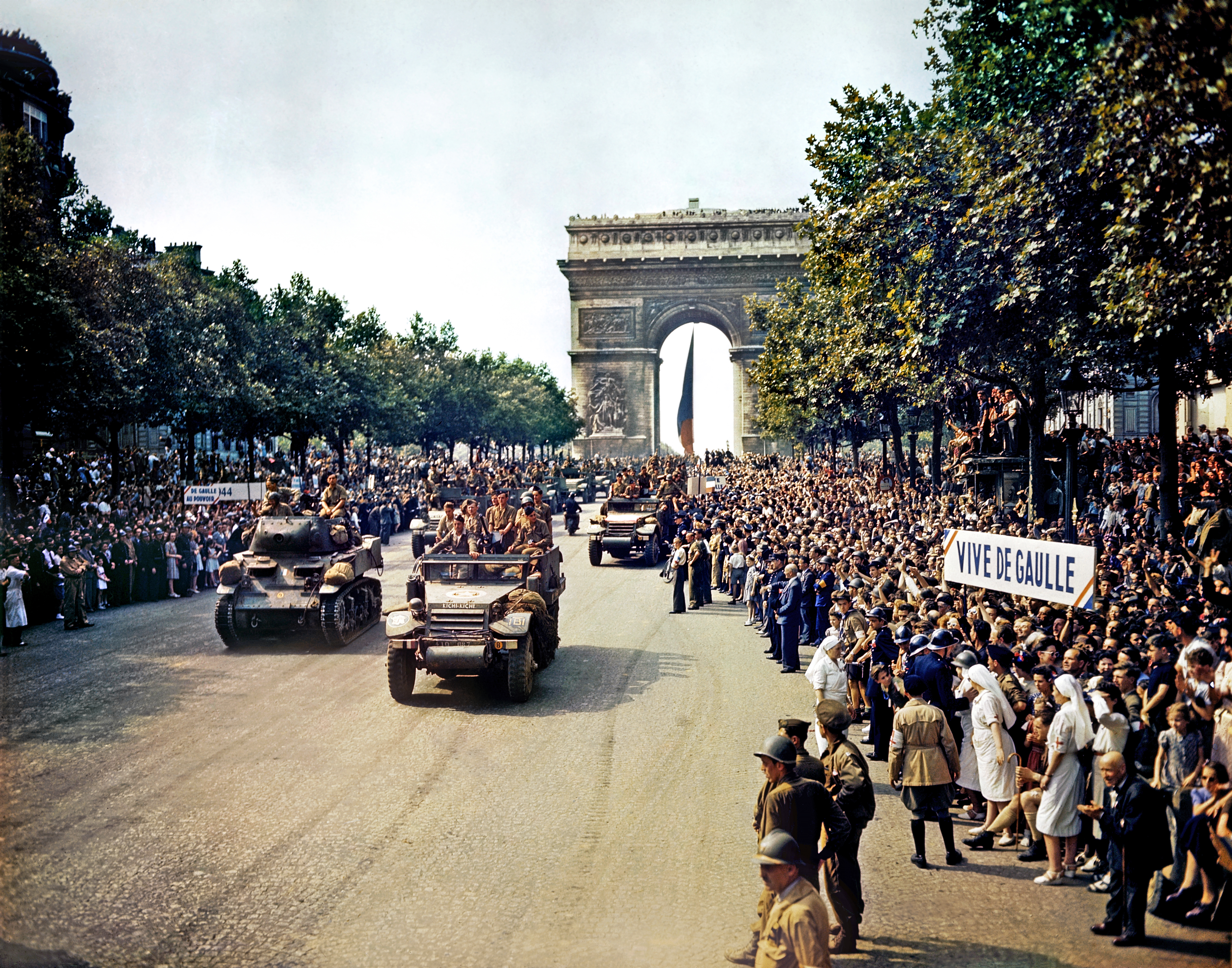
Leclerc's 2nd Armoured Division parading after the Battle for Paris, August 1944.

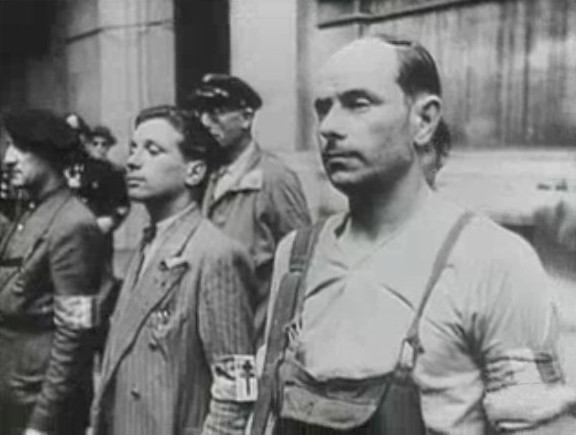
French resistance fighters in Paris at the Hotel de Ville, 1944.

The Liberation of Paris on August 25, 1944, with the support of Leclerc's French 2nd Armored Division, was one of the most famous moments of the French Resistance. Although it is again difficult to gauge their effectiveness precisely, popular anti-German demonstrations, such as general strikes by the Paris Métro, the gendarmerie and the police, took place, and fighting ensued.

The liberation of most of southwestern, central and southeastern France was finally fulfilled with the arrival of the 1st French Army of General de Lattre de Tassigny, which landed in Provence in August 1944 and was backed by over 25,000 maquis.

One source often referred to is General Dwight D. Eisenhower's comment in his military memoir, Crusade in Europe:

Throughout France, the Free French had been of inestimable value in the campaign. They were particularly active in Brittany, but on every portion of the front we secured help from them in a multitude of ways. Without their great assistance, the liberation of France and the defeat of the enemy in Western Europe would have consumed a much longer time and meant greater losses to ourselves.

General Eisenhower also estimated the value of the Resistance to have been equal to ten to fifteen divisions at the time of the landings. (One infantry division comprised about ten thousand soldiers.) Eisenhower's statements are all the more credible since he based them on his GHQ's formal analyses and published them only after the war, when propaganda was no longer a motive. Historians still debate how effective the French Resistance was militarily, but the neutralization of the Maquis du Vercors alone involved the commitment of over 10,000 German troops within the theater, with several more thousand held in reserve, as the Allied invasion was advancing from Normandy and French Operation Jedburgh commandos were being dropped nearby to the south to prepare for the Allied landing in Provence. One American officer, Ralph Ingersoll who served in SHEAF wrote in his book Top Secret:

...what cut the ice with us was the fact that when we came to France the Resistance was so effective that it took half a dozen real live German divisions to contend with it, divisions which might otherwise have been on our backs in the Bocage. And it made the most cynical sit up and take notice when we learned from German field officers that the Germans in central France were truly terrified, had to live under arms, could not move freely, had lost all control in sizable sectors even before we came ... It was a military fact that the French were worth at least a score of divisions to us, maybe more.

It is estimated that FFI killed some 2,000 Germans, a low estimate based on the figures from June 1944 only. Estimates of the casualties among the Resistance are made harder by the dispersion of movements at least until D-Day, but credible estimates start from 8,000 dead in action, 25,000 shot and several tens of thousands deported. For perspective, the best estimate is that 86,000 were deported from France without racial motive, overwhelmingly comprising resistance fighters and more than the number of Gypsies and Jews deported from France.

== Legacy ==
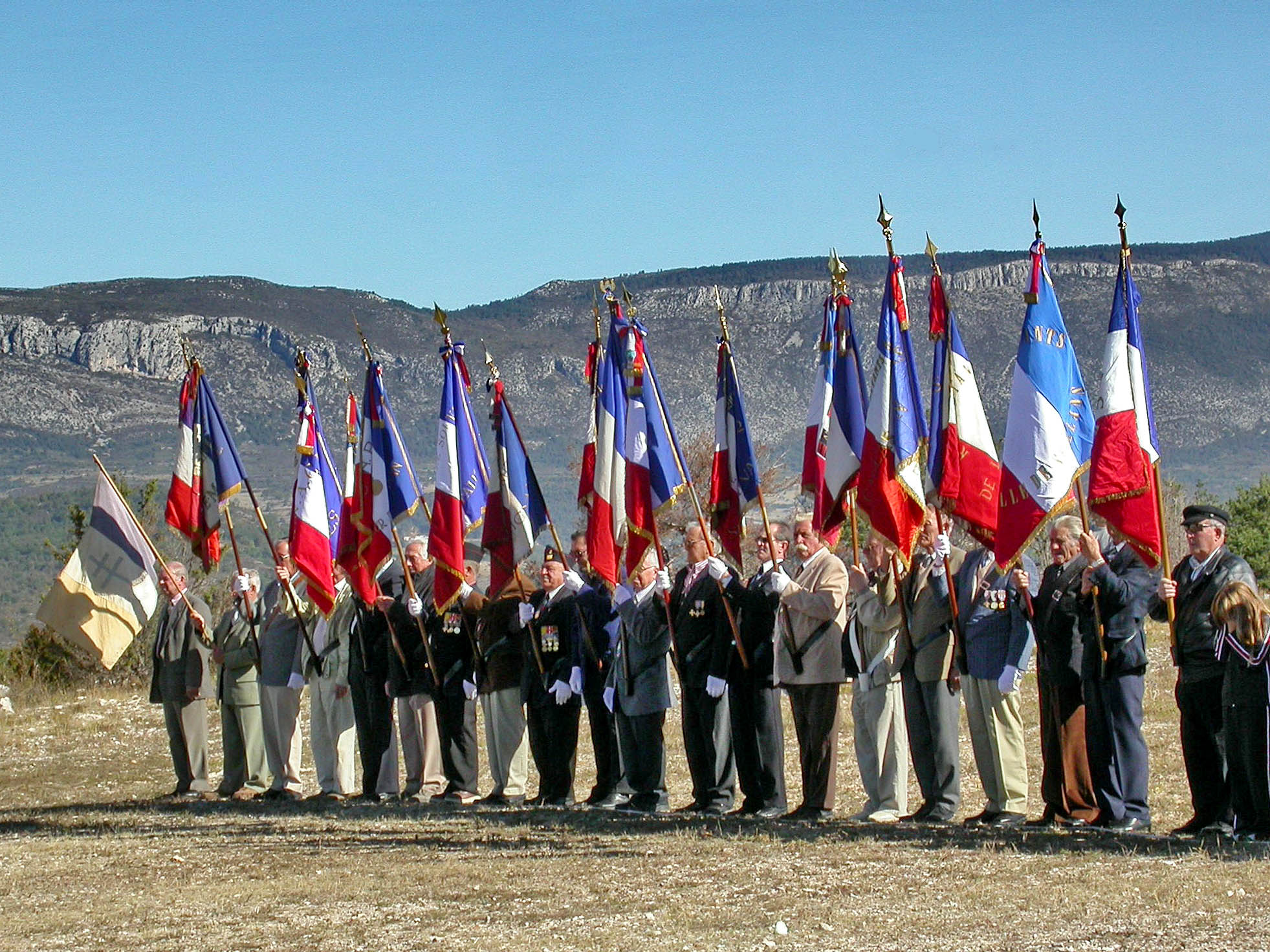
Veterans of the resistance raise flags at the annual commemoration ceremony of Canjuers military camp.

=== Épurations ("purges") ===
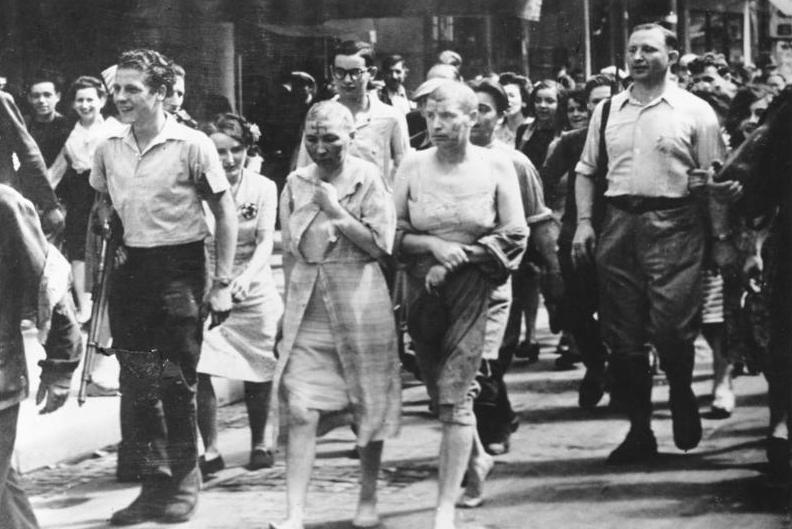
Women accused of collaboration with their heads shaved.

Immediately following the liberation, France was swept by a wave of executions, public humiliations, assaults and detentions of suspected collaborators, known as the épuration sauvage (wild purge). This period succeeded the German occupational administration but preceded the authority of the French Provisional Government, and consequently lacked any form of institutional justice. Approximately 9,000 were executed, mostly without trial as summary executions, notably including members and leaders of the pro-Nazi milices. In one case, as many as 77 milices members were summarily executed at once. An inquest into the issue of summary executions launched by Jules Moch, the Minister of the Interior, came to the conclusion that there were 9,673 summary executions. A second inquest in 1952 separated out 8,867 executions of suspected collaborators and 1,955 summary executions for which the motive of killing was not known, giving a total of 10,822 executions. Head-shaving as a form of humiliation and shaming was a common feature of the purges, and between 10,000 and 30,000 women accused of having collaborated with the Germans or having had relationships with German soldiers or officers were subjected to the practice, becoming known as les tondues (the shorn).

The official épuration légale ("legal purge") began following a June 1944 decree that established a three-tier system of judicial courts: a High Court of Justice which dealt with Vichy ministers and officials; Courts of Justice for other serious cases of alleged collaboration; and regular Civic Courts for lesser cases of alleged collaboration. Over 700 collaborators were executed following proper legal trials. This initial phase of the purge trials ended with a series of amnesty laws passed between 1951 and 1953 which reduced the number of imprisoned collaborators from 40,000 to 62, and was followed by a period of official "repression" that lasted between 1954 and 1971.

=== Historical analysis ===
During this period, and particularly after de Gaulle's return to power in 1958, the collective memory of "Résistancialisme" tended toward a highly resistant France opposed to the collaboration of the Vichy régime. This period ended when the aftermath of the events of May 1968, which had divided French society between the conservative "war generation" and the younger, more liberal students and workers, led many to question the Resistance ideals promulgated by the official history.

In coming to terms with the events of the occupation, several attitudes have emerged in France, in an evolution the historian Henry Rousso has called the "Vichy syndrome". The questioning of France's past had become a national obsession by the 1980s, fueled by the highly publicized trials of war criminals such as Paul Touvier and Maurice Papon.Although the occupation is often still a sensitive subject in the early 21st century, contrary to some interpretations the French as a whole have acknowledged their past and no longer deny their conduct during the war.

After the war, the influential French Communist Party (PCF) projected itself as "Le Parti des Fusillés" (The Party of Those Shot), in recognition of the thousands of communists executed for their Resistance activities. The number of communists killed was in reality considerably less than the Party's figure of 75,000. It is now estimated that close to 30,000 Frenchmen of all political movements combined were shot, of whom only a few thousand were communists. Others were deported, though, many of whom died in concentration camps.

The Vichy régime's prejudicial policies had discredited traditional conservatism in France by the end of the war, but following the liberation many former Pétainistes became critical of the official résistancialisme, using expressions such as "le mythe de la Résistance" (the myth of the Resistance), one of them even concluding, "The 'Gaullist' régime is therefore built on a fundamental lie."

=== Literature and films ===
The French Resistance has had a great influence on literature, particularly in France. A famous example is the poem "Strophes pour se souvenir", which was written by the communist academic Louis Aragon in 1955 to commemorate the heroism of the Manouchian Group, whose 23 members were shot by the Nazis. The Resistance is also portrayed in Jean Renoir's wartime This Land is Mine (1943), which was produced in the US. In the immediate postwar years, French cinema produced a number of films that portrayed a France broadly present in the Resistance. La Bataille du rail (1946) depicted the courageous efforts of French railway workers to sabotage German reinforcement trains, and in the same year Le Père tranquille told the story of a quiet insurance agent secretly involved in the bombing of a factory. Collaborators were unflatteringly portrayed as a rare unpopular minority, as played by Pierre Brewer in Jéricho (also 1946) or Serge Reggiani in Les Portes de la nuit (1946 as well), and movements such as the Milice were rarely evoked.

In the 1950s, a less heroic interpretation of the Resistance to the occupation gradually began to emerge. In Claude Autant-Lara's La Traversée de Paris (1956), the portrayal of the city's black market and the prevailing general mediocrity disclosed the reality of war-profiteering during the occupation. In the same year, Robert Bresson presented A Man Escaped, in which an imprisoned Resistance activist works with a reformed collaborator inmate to help him escape. A cautious reappearance of the image of Vichy emerged in Le Passage du Rhin (The Crossing of the Rhine)(1960), in which a crowd successively acclaims both Pétain and de Gaulle.

After General de Gaulle's return to power in 1958, the portrayal of the Resistance returned to its earlier résistancialisme. In this manner, in Is Paris Burning? (1966), "the role of the resistant was revalued according to [de Gaulle's] political trajectory". The comic form of films such as La Grande Vadrouille (also 1966) broadened the image of Resistance heroes in the minds of average Frenchmen. The most famous and critically acclaimed of all the résistancialisme movies is L'armée des ombres (Army of Shadows) by French filmmaker Jean-Pierre Melville in 1969, a film inspired by Joseph Kessel's 1943 book as well as Melville's own experience as a Resistance fighter who participated in Operation Dragoon. A 1995 television screening of L'armée des ombres described it as "the best film made about the fighters of the shadows, those anti-heroes." The shattering of France's résistancialisme following the civil unrest of May 1968 was made particularly clear in French cinema. The candid approach of the 1971 documentary The Sorrow and the Pity shone a spotlight on antisemitism in France and disputed the official Resistance ideals. Time magazine's positive review of the film wrote that director Marcel Ophüls "tries to puncture the bourgeois myth—or protectively askew memory—that allows France generally to act as if hardly any Frenchmen collaborated with the Germans."

Franck Cassenti, with L'Affiche Rouge (1976); Gilson, with La Brigade (1975); and Mosco with the documentary Des terroristes à la retraite addressed foreign resisters of the EGO, who were then relatively unknown. In 1974, Louis Malle's Lacombe, Lucien caused scandal and polemic for his lack of moral judgment regarding the behavior of a collaborator. Malle later portrayed the resistance of Catholic priests who protected Jewish children in his 1987 film Au revoir les enfants. François Truffaut's 1980 film Le Dernier Métro was set during the German occupation of Paris and won ten Césars for its story of a theatrical production staged while its Jewish director is concealed by his wife in the theater's basement. The 1980s began to portray the resistance of working women, as in Blanche et Marie (1984). Later, Jacques Audiard's Un héros très discret (1996) told the story of a young man's traveling to Paris and manufacturing a Resistance past for himself, suggesting that many heroes of the Resistance were impostors. In 1997 Claude Berri produced the biopic Lucie Aubrac based on the life of the Resistance heroine of the same name, which was criticized for its Gaullist portrayal of the Resistance and its overemphasizing the relationship between Aubrac and her husband.

In 2003, Kimberly Brubaker Bradley first published a book entitled For Freedom: The Story of a French Spy. Though classified as a work of fiction, the book is based on the real-life memories of Suzanne David Hall. Training to become an opera singer, Suzanne was traveling for rehearsals, costume fittings, and lessons when she was recruited by an organizer of the French Resistance and became a secret courier.

=== Museums and memorials ===
After the war, museums and memorials commemorating the events and the people involved in the resistance were established throughout France. The museums help identify key issues of the history and remembrance of the Resistance. One of the most important memorials of the French Resistance was the Mémorial de la France combattante.

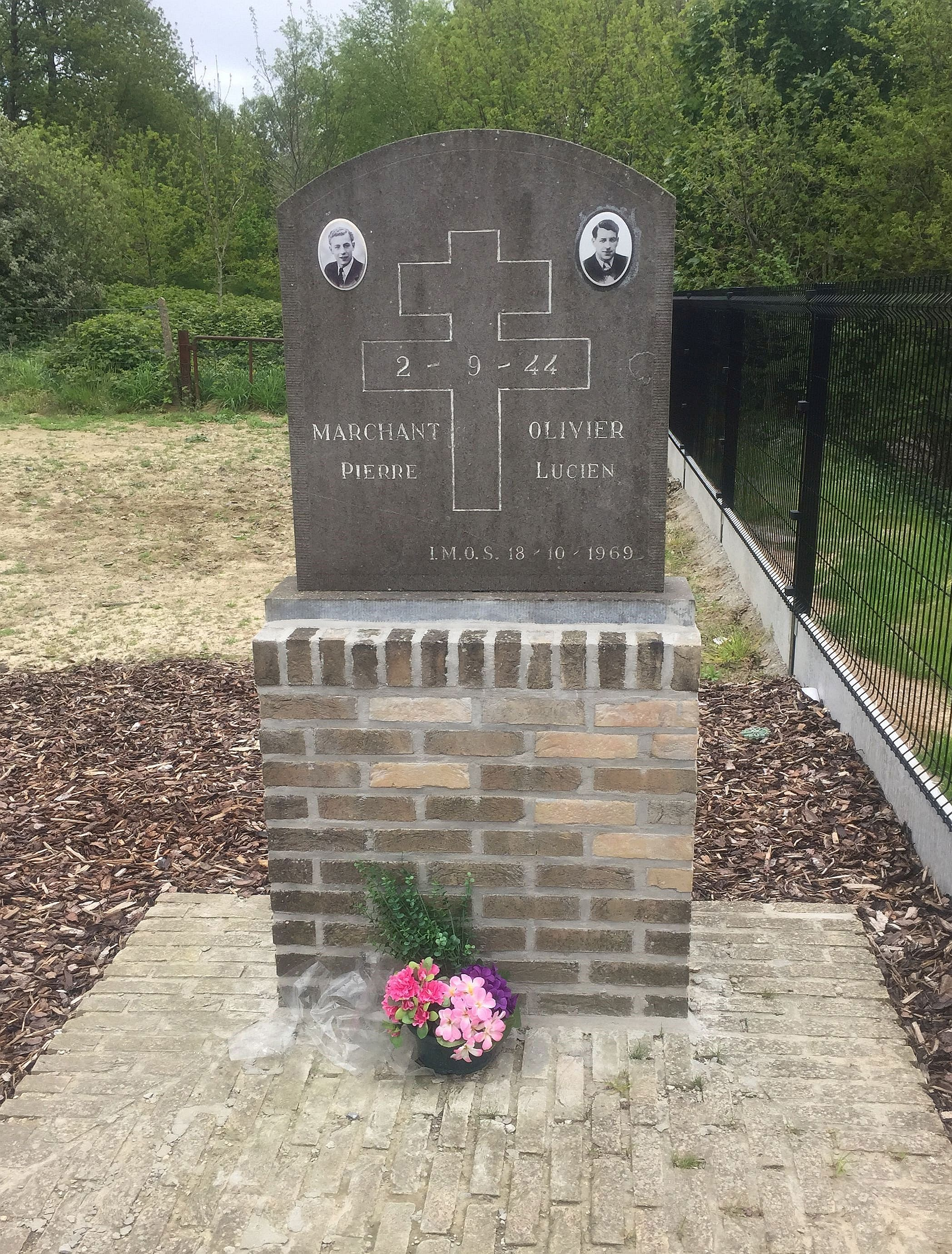
Memorial to French resistance fighters Marchant and Olivier, shot by the SS near Hill 60 (Ypres) in 1944.

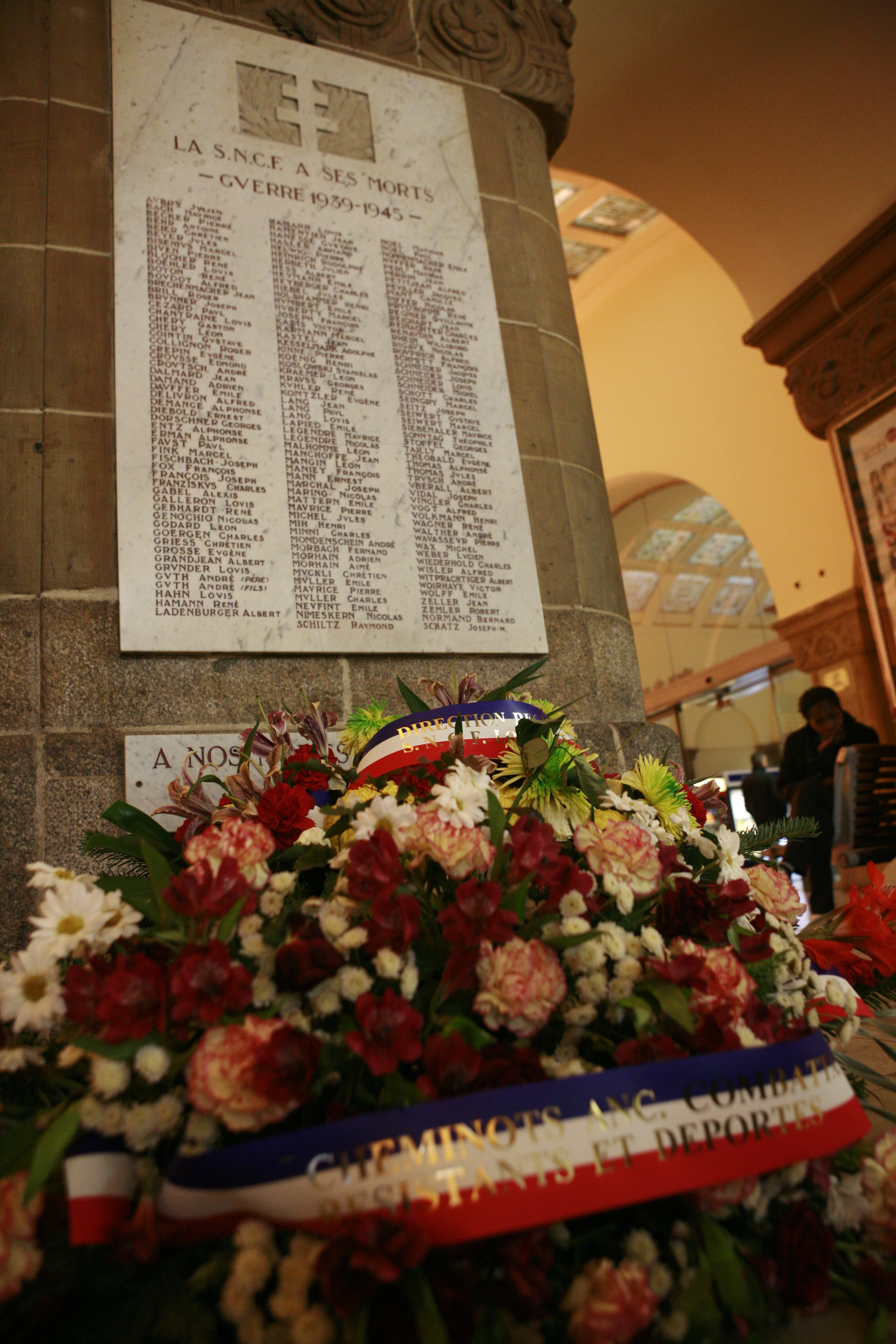
Tribute to SNCF personnel killed during the Second World War in Metz railway station.

== Cultural personalities ==
The well-known personalities of France—intellectuals, artists, and entertainers—faced a serious dilemma in choosing to emigrate or to remain in France during the country's occupation. Among those who actively fought in the Resistance, a number died for it—for instance the writer Jean Prévost, the philosopher and mathematician Jean Cavaillès, the historian Marc Bloch, and the philosopher Jean Gosset; among those who survived and went on to reflect on their experience, a particularly visible one was André Malraux.

Among prominent foreign figures who participated in the French Resistance was the political scientist and later Iranian Prime Minister Shapour Bakhtiar. After serving as the prime minister and strong man of the authoritarian Shah regime in Iran, he was forced back into Paris in the aftermath of the Islamic Revolution. He was assassinated on order of the Iranian Islamic Republic in 1991.

== In popular culture ==
The Resistance features in the Kevin Doherty novels Villa Normandie (Endeavour Press, 2015), which depicts a female Resistance cell leader as the novel's main character, Charlie's War (Endeavour Press, 2016), and Landscape of Shadows (Oceanview Publishing, 2022), and also in films such as the 1964 film The Train, based on fact about the Resistance's efforts to prevent a train carrying looted French art from getting to Germany, and the 2011 film 15 Lads, about a group of young Resistance fighters, inspired by the real-life experiences of director Romain Cogitore's grandfather, Antoine Cogitore, as a Resistance fighter in the maquis of Grande Chartreuse when he was a teenager.

In television, the series Un village français (English: A French Village) tells the extended story of a community of resistance members and the harsh realities that such a group faced during the entirety of the French occupation, and Resistance, created by TF1 in France (as Résistance), is a drama set in German-occupied Paris in 1940 depicting the lives of students and teachers within the Resistance, loosely based on the activities of the Groupe du musée de l'Homme. 'Allo 'Allo!, a British sitcom featuring Resistance activities, was conceived as a parody of the earlier BBC drama series Secret Army, and a number of characters in the Star Trek television franchise are members of the maquis. The 2022–2025 Disney+ series Andor, set in the Star Wars universe, has been noted as drawing heavily from the French Resistance; series creator Tony Gilroy cited Un village français as inspiration for the planet Ghorman, while critics have compared the character of Luthen Rael — a clandestine organizer secretly unifying disparate rebel cells against an authoritarian empire — to figures such as Jean Moulin.

Emmanuel d'Astier de La Vigerie, credited as Bernard, wrote the original French lyrics of Anna Marly's 1943 song "La Complainte du partisan", which later gained worldwide popularity as "The Partisan" with English lyrics adapted by Hy Zaret. The song describes the trials of a Resistance member from their perspective. Many artists have released versions of the song, in many languages, with the most well-known release being by Leonard Cohen in 1969.

== See also ==
- Adrien Pommier – French Resistance fighter
- Assassination of Karl Hotz – 1941 murder of German military officer
- Breton nationalism and World War II
- Chant des Partisans – 1943 French song by Anna Marly
- Coming home to liberated France (World War II)
- Femmes solidaires – Women's movement in France
- Shelburne Escape Line
- Timeline of SOE's Prosper Network
- Eugène Pons – Member of the French Resistance
- List of World War II weapons of France
