= Maria Lettberg =

Swedish pianist, resident in Berlin (born 1970)

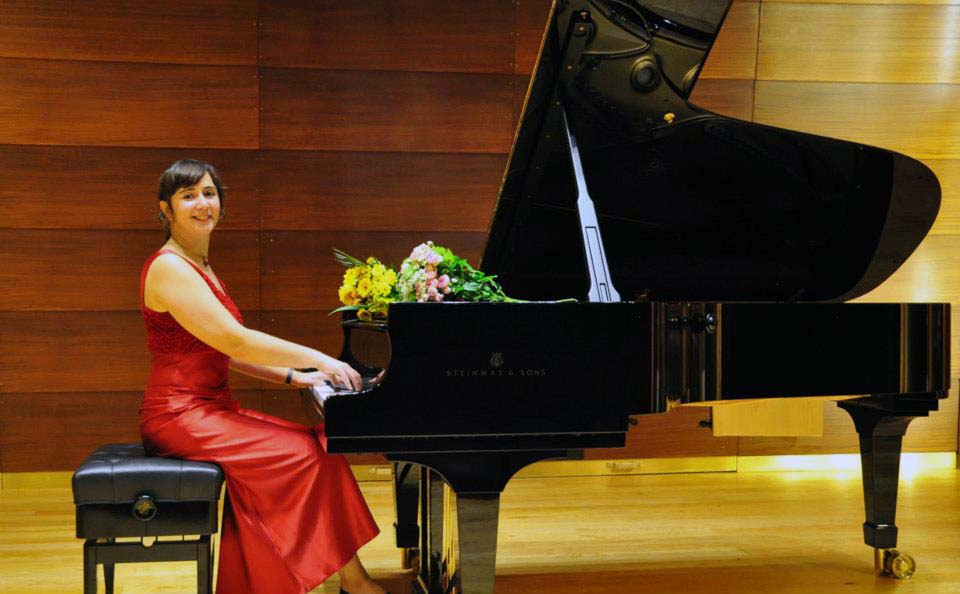

Maria Lettberg (born October 28, 1970 in Riga) is a Swedish pianist, resident in Berlin.

== Biography and artistic work ==
Lettberg is the daughter of a university professor of Russian literature and a mathematician. When she was seven, Maria's talent was recognised and fostered. She gave her graduate recital at the Saint Petersburg Conservatory. Following that, she pursued her studies further in Stockholm (Royal College of Music), in Bloomington (Indiana University) and in Helsinki (Sibelius Academy). Her most important teachers were Tatyana Zagorovskaja, Andrei Gavrilov, Paul Badura-Skoda, Menahem Pressler, Emanuel Krasovsky, Roland Pöntinen and Matti Raekallio.

Maria Lettberg's concert repertoire focuses on Brahms, Schumann, Liszt, Chopin and Scriabin, but, also Debussy, Prokofiev, Schnittke and Bach. Besides these composers, she also regularly plays the work of less well-known ones, in particular, those of Scandinavian and Russian origin. Ms. Lettberg has worked with Deutschlandradio for many years.

== Nomination for the 60th Annual Grammy Awards ==
Maria Lettberg has been nominated for the 60th Annual Grammy Awards – category Best Classical Instrumental Solo for her performance of Zara Levina's two piano concertos with the Rundfunk-Sinfonieorchester Berlin.

== Work on Alexander Nikolayevich Scriabin ==
Maria Lettberg is an interpreter of Alexander Scriabin. In 2007, she recorded Scriabin's solo piano work completely on eight CDs. This was followed in 2012 by the recording of "Opus Posthum" – the early piano works of Alexander Scriabin which are not numbered and the compositions of Scriabin's son Julian. Inspired by Scriabin's ideas, Maria Lettberg initiated and led two projects under the title of "Mysterium" (with Kaisa Salmi, Finland, and Andrea Schmidt, Germany). In both productions, a synaesthetic experience of art was achieved by the linking of musical and visual aspects. In 2008 Maria Lettberg did her PhD at the Sibelius Academy. The subject of her PhD dissertation was "An Historical Overview of Tendencies in the Interpretation of Alexander Scriabin’s piano sonata Nr. 10. - a comparative pianistic analysis".

== Recordings ==
- 2007: Alexander Scriabin: The Solo Piano Works, Complete Recording 8 CD-Box + DVD „Mysterium – The Multimedia Project“(Deutschlandradio Kultur/Capriccio)
- 2008: Alfred Schnittke: The Piano Concertos Nos. 1–3. Ewa Kupiec and Maria Lettberg, Rundfunk - Sinfonieorchester Berlin /Frank Strobel. (Deutschlandradio Kultur/Phoenix Edition)
- 2011: Erkki Melartin: The Solo Piano Works, 2 CD-Set (Deutschlandradio Kultur/Crystal Classics)
- 2011: Alfred Schnittke: Chamber Concerto (Piano Concerto No.2), Trio for piano, violin and cello, Quartet for piano, violin, viola and cello; Rundfunk-Sinfonieorchester Berlin /Frank Strobel, Petersen Quartet. (Deutschlandradio Kultur/Crystal Classics)
- 2012: „Opus Posthum“: Alexander und Julian Scriabin, Early Piano Works (Deutschlandradio Kultur/Es-Dur Hamburg)
- 2013: „The Enchanted Garden“: Piano transcriptions of Russian stage works, Mikhail Glinka, Nikolai Rimski-Korsakov and Igor Stravinsky. (Deutschlandradio Kultur/Es-Dur Hamburg)
- 2015: „Poème de l'extase“: Works of Alexander Scriabin, Olivier Messiaen, Franz Liszt, Manfred Kelkel and Harald Banter. (Deutschlandradio Kultur/Es-Dur Hamburg)
- 2017: Zara Levina: The Piano Concertos Nos. 1–2. Maria Lettberg, Rundfunk - Sinfonieorchester Berlin/ Ariane Matiakh. (Deutschlandradio Kultur/Capriccio)
- 2019: Zara Levina: Piano & Chamber music. Piano Sonatas; Violin Sonata; Poem for viola and piano; Canzonetta for cello and piano; "Hebrew Rhapsody" for piano for four hands. Maria Lettberg, Yury Revich, Gernot Adrion, Ringela Riemke, Katia Tchemberdji. (Deutschlandradio Kultur/Capriccio)
- 2025: „Europolis“ - European Sound: A musical Journey through 27 countries of the European Union (OehmsClassics Naxos Deutschland)

== Publications ==
- Lettberg, Maria: "Alfred Schnittke's Piano Trio: Learning and Performing", in: The Practice of Practising (Orpheus Research Centre in Music Series), Leuven University Press, 2011.
- Lettberg, Maria: "Alexander Skrjabin som pianist. Tekniska aspekter och estetiska principer". Finaali, Journal of Musical Performance and Research, Sibelius Akademie, 2004.
- Lettberg, Maria: Tendenser inom interpretationer av Alexander Skrjabins pianosonat nr 10: En jämförande pianistisk analys. (Tendencies within Interpretations of Alexander Scriabin's Piano Sonata No. 10: A Comparative Pianistic Analysis), Sibelius Akatemia, DokMus-tohtorikoulu, EST numero 20, 2012. http://ethesis.siba.fi/showrecord.php?ID=371162.

== Sources / Documentation ==
- The Penguin Guide to the 1000 Finest Classical Recordings: The Must-Have CDs and DVDs, IVAN MARCH (Hrsg.), London 2011 (Hardback): John Sheppard: Article „Scriabin, Alexander“, S.307.
- Maria Lettberg: formidable. Gramophone, BRYCE MORRISON (5/2008, Editor Choice, S. 92)
- "Gruß vom Chamäleon, ganz ohne Starrummel ist die Pianistin Maria Lettberg erfolgreich". Der Spiegel, Beilage „Der Kultur Spiegel“, JOHANNES SALTZWEDEL (4/2011, S. 36)
- "Ein Ausdruckswunder". Die Zeit, MIRKO WEBER (Nr. 23/11 vom 1. Juni 2011)
- "Große Taten. Maria Lettberg widmet sich Skrjabins Klavierwerk", Süddeutsche Zeitung, WOLFGANG SCHREIBER (22. Dezember 2008)
- "Porträt: Anwältin des Besonderen - MARIA LETTBERG". Piano News, HELMUT PETERS (6/2012 S. 40-42)
- "Maria Lettbergs Klavierkonzert abseits des Wohlgefälligen". Hamburger Abendblatt, TOM SCHULZ (14. September 2012)
- "Klangmagische Stimmungen, Maria Lettbergs Skrjabin-Abend in der Oetkerhalle". Neue Westfälische (17. September 2008)
- "Lettbergs Spiel: wie ein zarter Windhauch, Schwedische Pianistin sorgte bei den „Mittelrhein Musik Momenten“ für eine echte Sternstunde". Rhein-Zeitung, CHRISTIANE HAUSDING (3. August 2004)
- „Stämningbilder“. Fono Forum, Gregor Willmes (6/2011, S. 79)
