= Piano Sonata No. 5 (Scriabin) =

1907 piano sonata by Alexander Scriabin

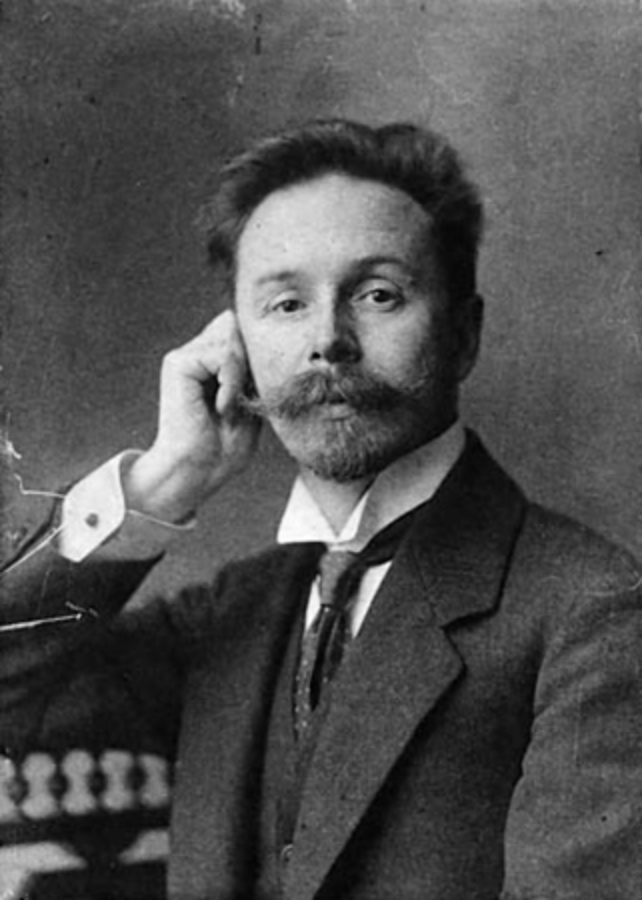
Alexander Scriabin (1872–1915)

The Piano Sonata No. 5, Op. 53, is a work written by Alexander Scriabin in 1907. This was his first sonata to be written in one movement, a format he retained from then on. A typical performance lasts from 11 to 12 minutes. The work is considered to be one of Scriabin's most difficult compositions, both technically and musically.

== Composition ==
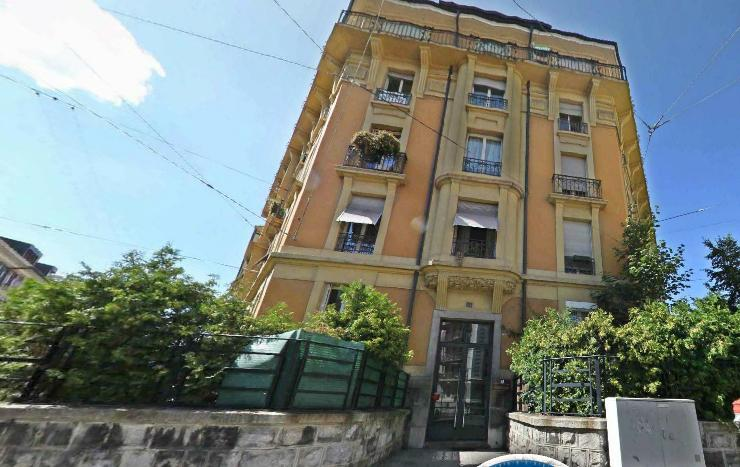
Avenue de la Harpe 14, Lausanne, Switzerland, where Scriabin lived between 1907 and 1908. Here he revised the score of his Poème de l'Extase and composed his Piano Sonata No. 5.

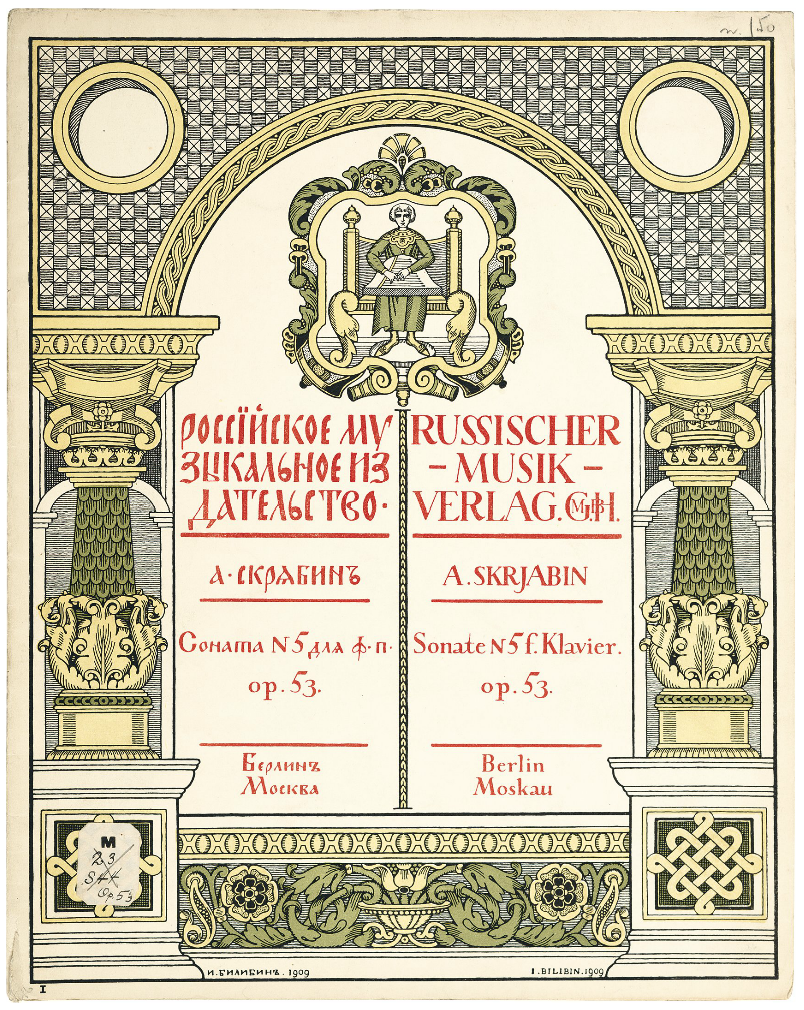
Cover page of one of the first editions of the work, Russischer Musikverlag, 1910, engraving by Ivan Bilibin

After finishing his symphonic poem Le Poème de l'Extase, Op. 54, Scriabin did not feel comfortable living in Paris. In early September 1907 he wrote:

Life is fearfully expensive, and the climate is rotten. The air in the areas where we could find an apartment big enough for us at a reasonable price is frightful ... you cannot make any noise. You have to wear house slippers after 10 at night.

Scriabin decided to go to live in Lausanne with his pregnant wife Tatyana, (Note: She would give birth to their son Julian in February 1908.) since he found the place to be cheaper, quieter, and healthier, and only 7 hours away from Paris. Also, he had his music being printed there, as he had recently broken his long-term partnership with publisher M.P. Belaieff due to financial discrepancies.

In his new peaceful household in Edifice C Place de la Harpe, (Note: Now Avenue de la Harpe 14.) Scriabin could play the piano without fear of complaints from neighbours, and soon began to compose again, alongside the revisions he was making to the score of Le Poème. On 8 December, Tatyana wrote to a friend:

We go out a little, having caught up on our sleep. We begin to look normal again. Sasha even has begun to compose – 5th Sonata!!! I cannot believe my ears. It is incredible! That sonata pours from him like a fountain. Everything you have heard up to now is as nothing. You cannot even tell it is a sonata. Nothing compares to it. He has played it through several times, and all he has to do is to write it down ...

In late December, Scriabin wrote to Margarita Morozova about the imminent completion of his new work:

The Poem of Ecstasy took much of my strength and taxed my patience. ... Today I have almost finished my 5th Sonata. It is a big poem for piano and I deem it the best composition I have ever written. I do not know by what miracle I accomplished it ...

Although the actual writing took only six days, from 8 to 14 December 1907, some ideas had been conceived much earlier. The initial nine bars of the first theme of the exposition, Presto con allegrezza ^{(mm. 47 ff.)}, can be found in a notebook from 1905 to 1906, when Scriabin was in Chicago. (Note: According to Bowers, this theme is related to the piece "Fragilité", Op. 51, No. 1, which acts as a preliminary study.) Another notebook from 1906 contains the Imperioso theme ^{(mm. 96 ff.)}, while elements from the Meno vivo ^{(mm. 120 ff.)} can also be made out, as well as sketched-out passages for a few other sections. (Note: Known sketches according to Rubcova: Three leaves in two different notebooks from the years 1905 and 1906. Moscow, Glinka-Museum, Fond 31, nos. 92 and 93. Two leaves, probably from the year 1907. Moscow, Glinka-Museum, Fond 31, no. 21)

Scriabin included an epigraph to this piano sonata, extracted from his essay Le Poème de l'Extase: (Note: Not to be confused with his Symphony No. 4 "Poem of Ecstasy", Op. 54.)

Original Russian text
Я к жизни призываю вас, скрытые стремленья!
Вы, утонувшие в темных глубинах
Духа творящего, вы, боязливые
Жизни зародыши, вам дерзновенье приношу!

Original French translation
Je vous appelle à la vie, ô forces mysterieuses!
Noyées dans les obscures profondeurs
De l'esprit créateur, craintives
Ebauches de vie, à vous j'apporte l'audace!

English translation
I call you to life, O mysterious forces!
Drowned in the obscure depths
Of the creative spirit, timid
Shadows of life, to you I bring audacity!

Five months after its completion, Scriabin published the work himself in Lausanne, producing an edition with 300 copies. He later gave the autograph as a present to his pupil Alfred La Liberté. In 1971 the pianist's widow gave the manuscript, along with various other documents, to the Scriabin Museum.

MIDI capture from piano performance (12:08)

The work was premiered on 18 November 1908 in Moscow by pianist Mark Meitschik.

== Structure ==
The piece is written in sonata form with an introduction. The structure of the work is described in the table below:

Section	Subsection	Excerpt	mm.	Description
Introduction	1	Mm. 1–3. Allegro impetuoso theme. All the notes belong to a diatonic scale, but there is no clearly discernible tonality.	1–12	The sonata begins with an introduction. Its first part consists of an agitated theme, marked allegro-impetuoso-con stravaganza. It features trills and glissandos, and ends in an agitated ascending rush followed by a pause.
Introduction	2	Mm. 13–24. Languido theme. All the harmonies are related to an F♯-dominant chord.	13–46	A second theme follows at m. 13, marked languido. (Note: Scriabin wrote a double barline between mm. 46 and 47, thus clearly marking this as a separate section from the exposition.)
Exposition	First theme	Mm. 47–53 and 68–69. Presto con allegrezza theme. In its first appearance it is harmonized as a dominant eleventh chord. Later it is restated over a tonic pedal.	47–95	The exposition commences at m. 47. The first theme, marked presto con allegrezza is in F♯ major and set in binary form. The first half begins with a 6-bar phrase (harmonized as dominant eleventh chord) followed by the same phrase transposed a fourth higher (harmonized with a C♯ minor seventh chord). After this, a 4-bar and a derived 5-bar phrases. The second half ^{(mm. 69 ff.)} begins as A but now over a tonic pedal. After reprising the first 12 bars, a series of shorter phrases bring more agitation to the passage, leading to the transition passage.
Exposition	Transition	Mm. 96–99. Imperioso and sotto voce misterioso affanato motifs. The first features an angular melody over an arpeggiated dominant chord. The second is built on block French sixth chords Mm. 114–117. Quasi tromba motif, built on an E♭ major seventh chord in first inversion. It is followed by a C-dominant ninth chord, that prepares the second theme.	96–119	The transition begins at m. 96, and consists of three 2-bar motifs. It gradually moves from the initial C♯ major tonality to the Bb major tonality of the second theme. The first motif is marked imperioso . The second is marked sotto voce misterioso affanato. These two motifs are presented alternatively three times, then, the second is prolonged and bursts in a third 2-bar motif marked quasi trombe-imperioso. A dominant ninth chord prepares the entrance of the second theme.
Exposition	Second theme	Mm. 120–124 and 134–135. Meno vivo theme. In its first appearance it is harmonised as a dominant chord. Later it is restated over a tonic pedal.	120–139	The second theme begins at m. 120. It is marked meno mosso, is in B♭ major and also set in binary form. The first half begins with a chromatic phrase built over a dominant chord. The second ^{(mm. 134 ff.)} quotes the first but now over a tonic pedal.
Exposition	Codetta	Mm. 140–148. Allegro fantastico motif followed by presto tumultuoso esaltato theme. The first features major seventh chords. The second is built on motifs from the first theme and ends in the quasi tromba-imperioso motif and a seventh B♭ major tonic chord.	140–165	The codetta follows at m. 140, interrupting the second theme. It consists of three motifs. First, a new 2-bar motif, marked allegro fantastico, followed by a longer idea, marked presto tumultuoso esaltato, which is stated twice. It concludes with a shortened version of the trill theme transposed a major second up.
Development	1	Mm. 166–171. Literal restatement of the languido theme transposed a major second up.	166–184	The development at m.166 begins presenting the first 17 bars of languido theme transposed a major second up.
Development	2	Mm. 185–197. First theme interrupted several times by imperioso theme.	185–226	The development section follows with an episode featuring the first theme, which is "interrupted" several times by the imperioso motif.
Development	3	Mm. 227–230. Passage derived from the presto tumultuoso esaltato theme. Mm. 247–248 and 251–252. Parodies of the trills theme and the languido theme.	227–270	The next section features materials derived from the coda and the introduction. First, the presto tumultuoso esaltato is developed. The trills theme is briefly quoted^{(mm. 247–250)}. Then, the languido theme is mocked ^{(mm. 251ff.)}.
Development	4	Mm. 271–273. Fragmentary statements of the meno mosso theme. Mm. 281–284. The meno mosso is interrupted by the allegro fantastico theme twice.	271–288	At m. 271 fragments of the meno mosso theme appear. First, it is partly stated twice, and then, it is interrupted twice by the allegro fantstico theme.
Development	5	Mm. 289–293. Passage based on the allegro fantastico theme.	289–312	At m. 289 the allegro fantastico motif succeeds over the meno mosso theme, and a passage built over this motif begins, creating increasing tension.
Development	6		313–329	At m. 313 the allegro fantastico passage burst in a climax based on the meno mosso theme. The four-bar phrase is stated three times, each one a fifth lower, first in D♭ major, then in G♭ and finally in B. However, the expected final climax is interrupted by the reexposition of the first theme in pp.
Recapitulation			329–400	The exposition (second half of the first theme, transition, second theme) is repeated note-for-note transposed a fifth down.
Coda			401–457	The coda is modified so as to lead to a climatic fff statement of the languido theme, followed by the ascending rush of the first musical idea.

== Harmonic language ==
According to Samson, unlike his later sonatas, (Note: According to Samson, in sonatas nos. 6 and 7, formal tensions are created by the absence of harmonic contrast and "between the cumulative momentum of the music, usually achieved by textural rather than harmonic means, and the formal constraints of the tripartite mould".) the sonata-form of this work still has some meaning to the work's tonal structure. That means the sonata is arguably in F-sharp major (owing to the initial key signature of six sharps), but the sonata could also be said to be atonal due to its lack of a definite tonal center.

The work does not contain any perfect cadence, nor any consonant chord. (Note: Not including passing notes that create circumstantial consonant harmonies, arpeggiations, broken chords (i.e. a dissonant chord broken into consonant subsets) or inversions. There is no consonant tonic chord.)

The work features one of the strange occurrences of the complete mystic chord spelled in fourths (mm. 264 and 268). Jim Samson points out that it fits in well with Scriabin's predominantly dominant quality sonorities and harmony as it may take on a dominant quality on C or F♯. This tritone relationship between possible resolutions is important to Scriabin's harmonic language, and it is a property shared by the French sixth (also prominent in his work).

The piece also contains an incipient instance of the mystic chord which helps illuminate its origins in tonal language; first appearing at m. 122, the set [0 2 4 6 T] is presented as a dominant chord with its flat fifth in the bass, later revealed to be an extended appoggiatura to the tonic (m. 134), over which the same notes form a major 13th chord in root position. Compare this presentation with the 'mature' mystic chord, [0 1 3 5 7 9].

== Recordings ==
This is Scriabin's most recorded sonata. The pianist Sviatoslav Richter described it and Liszt's first Mephisto Waltz as the most difficult pieces in the entire piano repertory.

Notable recordings include those by Stanislav Neuhaus, Alexei Sultanov, Vladimir Ashkenazy, Vladimir Horowitz, Sviatoslav Richter, Vladimir Sofronitsky, Michael Ponti, Samuil Feinberg, Glenn Gould, Garrick Ohlsson, Marc-André Hamelin, Bernd Glemser, Maria Lettberg, Igor Zhukov, Yevgeny Sudbin and Pietro Scarpini.

== Notes and references ==
Notes
