= Piano Sonata No. 4 (Scriabin) =

Piano sonata written by Alexander Scriabin

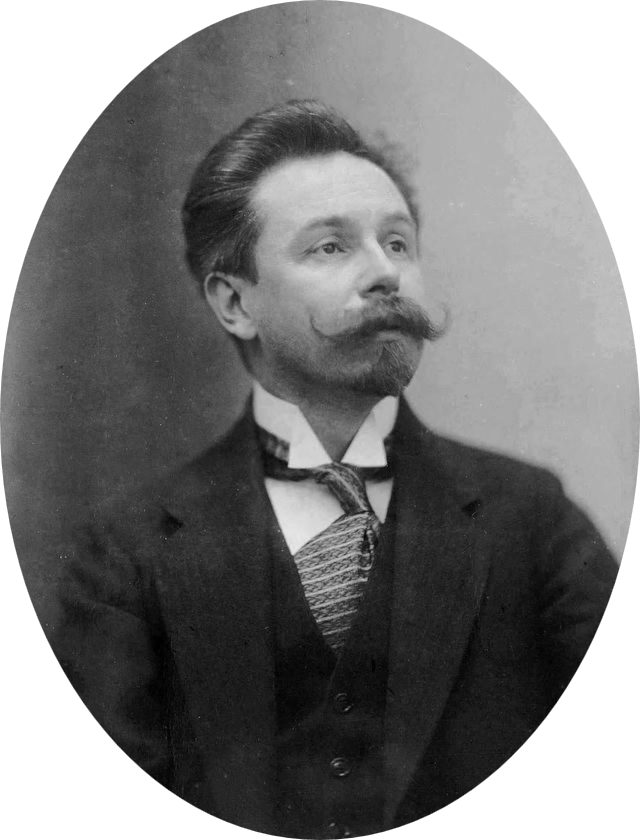
Alexander Scriabin in 1900

The Piano Sonata No. 4 in F♯ major, Op. 30, was written by Alexander Scriabin around 1903 and first published in 1904. It consists of two movements, Andante and Prestissimo volando, and is one of Scriabin's shortest piano sonatas; a typical performance takes about 8 minutes. The sonata is generally considered to be the beginning of Scriabin's middle period due to the newly mystical sonorities and tonal ambiguity of the first movement. It remains one of the most performed of Scriabin's sonatas.

== Stylistic traits ==
The sonata is written in a post-Romantic style, similar to Scriabin's other works of the time. The first movement, expressive and calm, is monothematic (based on a single theme). The second movement, celebratory and climactic, starts attacca right after the Andante movement.

A more Romantic idea is the use of cyclic form in restating the Andante’s main theme (dolcissimo) as the ecstatic climax of the Prestissimo volando movement (Focosamente, giubiloso). This outlay appears closely related to the last two movements from the 3rd sonata, also linked by an attacca, where the climax of the finale likewise restates the lyrical Andante theme of the third movement. Russian composers such as Tchaikovsky or Rachmaninoff often restated the lyric theme of the finale movement as climactic coda (for example in the piano concertos). Scriabin instead returns to the 'slow' movement's theme, and this may have led to further experiments with a condensation of form in the single-movement 5th sonata where the climax (estatico) is again a restatement of the Languido theme (dolcissimo).

== Background ==
Scriabin wrote a poem after composing this sonata that explains its meaning:

In a light mist, transparent vapor
Lost afar and yet distinct
A star gleams softly.

How beautiful! The bluish mystery
Of her glow
Beckons me, cradles me.

O bring me to thee, far distant star!
Bathe me in trembling rays
Sweet light!

Sharp desire, voluptuous and crazed yet sweet
Endlessly with no other goal than longing
I would desire

But no! I vault in joyous leap
Freely I take wing.

Mad dance, godlike play!
Intoxicating, shining one!

It is toward thee, adored star
My flight guides me.

Mad dance, godlike play!
Intoxicating, shining one!

Toward thee, created freely for me
To serve the end
My flight of liberation!

In this play
Sheer caprice
In moments I forget thee
In the maelstrom that carries me
I veer from thy glimmering rays.

In the intensity of desire
Thou fadest
O distant goal.

But ever thou shinest
As I forever desire thee!

Thou expandest, Star!
Now thou art a Sun
Flamboyant Sun! Sun of Triumph!

Approaching thee by my desire for thee
I lave myself in thy changing waves
O joyous god.

I swallow thee
Sea of light.

My self-of-light
I engulf thee!

== Recordings ==
Notable recordings include those by Vladimir Sofronitsky, Vladimir Ashkenazy, Mikhail Pletnev, Ivo Pogorelić, Marc-André Hamelin.
