= Piano Sonata No. 3 (Scriabin) =

Piano sonata written by Alexander Scriabin

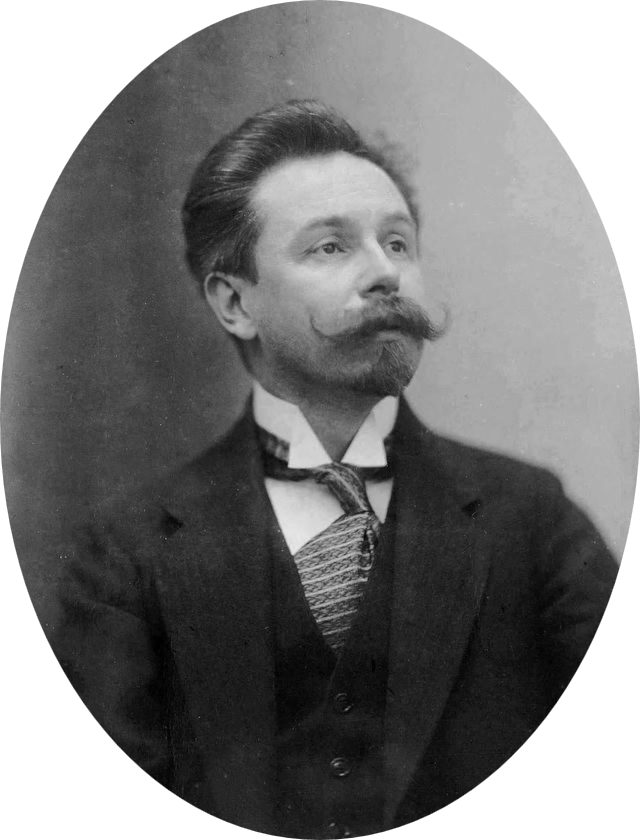
Alexander Scriabin in 1900

The Piano Sonata No. 3 in F♯ minor, Op. 23, by Alexander Scriabin was composed between 1897 and 1898. The sonata consists of four movements, typically spanning 18 minutes in performance.

== Background ==
Scriabin had been married to a young pianist, Vera Ivanovna Isaakovich, in August 1897. Having given the first performance of his Piano Concerto at Odessa, Scriabin and his wife went to Paris, where he started to work on the new sonata. Scriabin is said to have called the finished work "Gothic", evoking the impression of a ruined castle. Some years later however, he devised a different programme for this sonata entitled "States of the Soul":

*[First movement, Drammàtico:] The soul, free and wild, thrown into the whirlpool of suffering and strife.

- [Second movement, Allegretto:] Apparent momentary and illusory respite; tired from suffering the soul wants to forget, wants to sing and flourish, in spite of everything. But the light rhythm, the fragrant harmonies are just a cover through which gleams the restless and languishing soul.
- [Third movement, Andante:] A sea of feelings, tender and sorrowful: love, sorrow, vague desires, inexplicable thoughts, illusions of a delicate dream.
- [Finale, Presto con fuoco:] From the depth of being rises the fearsome voice of creative man whose victorious song resounds triumphantly. But too weak yet to reach the acme he plunges, temporarily defeated, into the abyss of non-being.

Together with Camille Saint-Saëns, Edvard Grieg and Sergei Rachmaninoff, Scriabin is one of the few composers from the Romantic era to have left a recorded legacy. He recorded this sonata before 1912 on piano rolls for Hupfeld-Phonola, a German maker of Player Pianos. This recording includes some deviations from the printed music. Many of the sonatas were also recorded by Scriabin's son-in-law Vladimir Sofronitsky. Other notable recordings include those by Vladimir Ashkenazy, Emil Gilels, Vladimir Horowitz, Glenn Gould, Evgeny Kissin, Garrick Ohlsson, Yuja Wang, and Burkard Schliessmann.

== Structure and content ==
The sonata features a typical four movement layout with an opening sonata form, a ternary scherzo, a slow movement (also in ternary form) and a finale in sonata form. Also, like other Russian composers (Tchaikovsky, Rachmaninoff, etc.), Scriabin makes use of cyclic form, in this case by making references of movements I and III in the finale.

=== I. Drammatico ===
The first movement is laid out in a conventional sonata form without repetition. The sonata opens with a dramatic first theme in F♯ minor, with measures 1 and 2 presenting the insistent rhythmic motifs which will pervade throughout that section. The theme is unusually short, spanning only 8 bars and ending in a rest over the dominant chord. After this, the following 16-bar transition develops the previous material in several violent outbursts, progressively diverging from the original key and preparing the entrance of the second theme.

Contrasting with the turbulent first section, the second theme in A major, starting at measure 24, is calm and marked cantabile. The beginning 6 bars present the first half of this section, whose initial descending motif will be reused throughout the movement. The second half, in a slightly more vivid tempo and marked poco scherzando, features imitative counterpoint in both hands.

Starting at measure 43, the second theme leads to the placid codetta, also in A major, which is based on the initial theme. The modified opening four bars of the piece are stated twice, first alone and then above the descending motif of the second theme. The following four bars bring the exposition of this movement to a calm end.

The modulating development section, starting at measure 55, makes a return to the minor mode and uses the musical ideas presented in the exposition. At first there is an insistent superposition of the opening bars along with the descending idea of the second theme. At measure 77, the other half of the second theme makes its appearance along with the first theme.

After the musically unstable development, the recapitulation of the sonata form begins at measure 95. The eight-bar first theme is stated again in the original key, although now modified so as to lead directly to the second theme, without any transition in between. The second theme remains unchanged, now transposed to the home key of F♯ major.

The coda that follows at measure 125 can be subdivided in two parts. The first is a triumphant fortissimo statement of the descending motive of the second theme over the first theme. The second part is an exact transposition of the codetta of the exposition (which also features the same thematic superposition), which leads the whole movement to a calm end.

=== II. Allegretto ===
In a similar way the constant repeats of the Baroque-like sixteenth-note triplets in the middle section of the Allegretto create the "state of gracefulness".

=== III. Andante ===
A more Romantic idea is the use of cyclic form in linking the two last movements by a pianissimo memory of the Drammàtico theme, and in the Maestoso restatement of the Andante theme as the ecstatic climax of the finale. Russian composers such as Tchaikovsky or Rachmaninoff often restated the lyric theme of the finale movement as climactic coda (for example in the piano concertos). Scriabin shows more boldness in using the "slow" movement's theme, and this may have led to further experiments with a condensation of form in the next two sonatas. The outlay of the two movements from Sonata No. 4 appears to be closely related to the last two movements from No. 3 and the climax of the Prestissimo volando movement (Focosamente, giubiloso) is an ecstatic version of the Andante's main theme (dolcissimo). A further condensation into a one-single-movement sonata has taken place in the 5th sonata, and—again—the climax (estatico) is a restatement of the Languido theme (dolcissimo).

=== IV. Presto con fuoco ===
Like Wagner, the modernistic traits in Scriabin can be seen as a result of using more and more radical means to express Romantic ideas. The compression of the finale's theme in its conclusive triple statement (signaling the "plunge of the soul into the abyss of non being") does not sound Romantic anymore.

After this ending one somehow expects to hear the "Drammàtico" opening of the first movement again. Scriabin (who indulged in theosophical speculation) has created a "cosmic cycle" by opening and concluding the sonata with a very similar energetic signal. In a performance of the Andante from this sonata Scriabin is alleged to have exclaimed: "Here the stars are singing!"

With the final appearance of the slow movement's theme at the end of the finale, Scriabin builds up anticipation of a grand ending in F♯ major, and then frustrates our expectations, ending the work bleakly.
