= Piano Sonata in F-sharp major =

Piano Sonata in F-sharp major may refer to:

- Piano Sonata No. 24 (Beethoven)
- Piano Sonata No. 4 (Scriabin)
