= Manfred Kelkel =

French musicologist and composer

Manfred Kelkel (15 January 1929 – 18 April 1999) was a 20th-century French musicologist and composer of contemporary music. A pupil of Darius Milhaud at the Conservatoire de Paris, he became interested in the music of Russian composer Alexander Scriabin, whose latest works (from Prometheus: The Poem of Fire to Mysterium) influenced his own compositions. His work on Scriabin and a certain esoteric aesthetic of music are authoritative.

== Studies and publications ==
Kelkel was born in Siersburg in Saarland, then under French occupation

As a student of Darius Milhaud at the Conservatoire de Paris, Kelkel "always felt a sincere admiration and almost filial recognition for his former teacher, even if, aesthetically speaking, he followed a divergent path.".

From 1969 onwards, the composer resumed his university studies, obtaining a doctoral degree and a State doctorate of music and musicology, "with works that have since become authoritative in their fields", from his study À la recherche de la musique polynésienne traditionnelle, in ethnomusicology, to State doctorate on lyrical music at the beginning of the 20th century (Naturalisme, vérisme et réalisme dans l'opéra). His postgraduate thesis, dedicated to the Russian composer Alexander Scriabin (Scriabine, sa vie, l'ésotérisme et le langage musical dans son œuvre), is a defining moment in his career.

In his memories, Jacques Viret evokes a man "of perfect simplicity, modesty and affability", making him meet Marina Scriabin, daughter of the composer of the Mysterium, of which the Acte préalable presents a twelve-tone tuning which carried him with enthusiasm.

Among the many publications by Manfred Kelkel, Jean-Jacques Velly mainly retains the book Musique des mondes, published in 1988, "a unique work of its kind which synthesizes his two activities as a composer and musicologist."

== Teaching ==
Manfred Kelkel has held a number of important positions in music publishing and higher education. Music Director from 1957 to 1978 at Éditions Heugel, he was a lecturer at the Universities of Paris IV, Metz, Strasbourg II and Paris XII from 1974 to 1981, before being appointed professor at Lumière University Lyon 2, from 1985 to 1991, the year he was appointed to Paris IV.

Passionate about traditional Arabic music and early twentieth-century Russian music, he was the thesis director of André Lischke, himself a future specialist of Tchaikovsky's music and of The Mighty Handful.

== Composition ==
Fascinated by oriental civilizations and occult practices, Manfred Kelkel decided on the basis of Tabula Smaragdina (referring to the Emerald Tablet), to apply to his compositions "in a rational and coherent manner, principles derived from Chinese esoterism, Arabic geomancy and the alchemical operations, playing on unsuspected correspondence between Buddhist mandalas, hermetic diagrams, magic squares and the art of sound".

Jean-Jacques Velly undertook a brief analysis of his musical language. In the field of melody, writing is "governed by three essential elements: chromatic total, modal use of melody and the use of artificial symmetrical scales". In the harmonic domain, his work "draws inspiration from Scriabin's latest works and makes extensive use of chords that are more or less complex and close to the chromatic total", in a polytonality where "melody and harmony are articulated on solid landmarks, even if the resulting musical syntax has nothing in common with tonality in the narrow sense".

"An admirer of Berlioz and the great Germanic orchestra school of the 19th century," his orchestral writing "is distinguished by an emphasis on the instrumental timbre in which his musical thought immediately becomes part of his orchestral work." In the field of orchestration, his mastery and originality were recognized very early on, in particular by Henri Dutilleux. Jacques Viret sees in Manfred Kelkel an "alchemist of sounds".

In the field of rhythm, the science of the teacher and the composer come together in his scores. Philippe Reynal evokes a "real puzzle for students"!

Manfred Kelkel died in Paris 18 April 1999 at age 70, shortly after the publication of his biography and full analysis of the works of Scriabin.

== Works ==
=== Symphonies ===
- Symphonie n°1 Per aspera ad astra op.34, commission by Radio France (1983), premiered 19 October 1995
- Symphonie n°2 Architectura Cælestis op.40 (1986/87)

=== Concertos ===
- Concertino for cello and chamber orchestra op.4 (1955)
- Rhapsodie for saxophone and orchestra op.12 (1962)
- Concerto for bassoon op.13 (1963)
- Concerto de Zagreb for guitar and orchestra op.19 (1969)

=== Pieces for orchestra ===
- Musique funèbre for oboe and orchestra op.5 (1954/61)
- Hommage à Mozart, for string orchestra op.7 (1956)
- Ostinato et Mazel Tov, opening on a theme by Darius Milhaud op.11 (1960)
- Suite de danses hongroises for orchestra op.18 (1967)
- Ouverture sur un thème de Darius Milhaud (after op.11) op.21 (1971)
- Tombeau de Scriabine from the sketches of the Acte préalable by Alexander Scriabin, op.22 (1972/1973) with the permission of the composer's heirs
- Tabula Smaragdina, acoustic mandalas for piano, percussion, chorus and small orchestra op.24 (1975-1978)
- Ming Tang, symphonic poem for chamber orchestra op.39 (1990)

=== Chamber music and for ensemble ===
- Toccata for piano op.2/1 (1952) / for oboe and piano op.2/2 (1969)
- Divertimento for oboe, clarinet and bassoon op.3 (1952)
- Quatuor à cordes n° 1 op.6 n°1 (1955)
- Quatuor à cordes n° 2 op.6 n°2 (1956)
- Sonatine for oboe (or recorder) and piano op.9 (1959)
- Suite for oboe (or recorder), celesta and gong op.10 (1959)
- Laterna magica for clarinet, bassoon, trumpet, violin, piano and percussion op.16 (1964)
- Miniatures pour le petit Alexandre, 7 children's songs for piano without opus number (1964)
- Danses aux miroirs, for harp, piano, celesta and string quartet op.20 (1969/1970)
- Deux pièces for solo harp (Melancolia and Mirabilis) op.23 (1970)
- Castalia pour flûte et bande sonore op.25 (1979)
- Talisman, sound mandala for 3 trombones and analogue echo op.28 (1981)
- Crachat de lune for celesta (or piano) and percussions op.29 (1981)
- Saturnalia for 3 violas and magnetic tape op.30 (1982)
- Tan Matra, sound mandala for 5 ondes Martenot or wind quintet op.31 (1981/1982)
- Athanor, for variable ensemble op.32 (1983)
- Irigangi for horn and analog echo op.35 (1984)
- Malinconia for solo guitar op.26 (1985)
- Rongorongo for Alphorn and basset horn op.36 (1985)
- Quatuor à cordes n° 3 op.38 (1992)
- Enigma, geometrical figures for organ op.41 (1997)

=== Vocal music ===
- Mélodies d'automne, for singing and piano, op. 1 (1950).
- Chanson à boire, for men's choir, op. 15 (1961).
- Les Voix de l'au-delà, mystery play after Victor Hugo for narrator, soloists, choir, tape and orchestra, op. 27 (1980/1981).

=== Incidental music ===
- Le Cœur froid, ballet with choir op.8 (1956/1958)
- La Mandragore, one-act psychodrama op.17 (1965/1966)
- V.I.T.R.I.O.L. (Note: It should be recalled that the acrostic V. I. T. R. I. O. L. decrypts Visita Interiora Terrae Rectificando Invenies Occultum Lapidem and is translated as "Visit the interior of the earth and, by rectifying, you will find the hidden stone.) audiovisual show after Chymical Wedding by Johann Valentin Andreae, for narrator, magnetic tape and small ensemble, op.33 (1983)
- Aux armes, citoyens, popular action for narrator, 2 mixed choirs and magnetic tape, op.37 (1989)
- Lady L, radio program after Romain Gary, op.42 (1997)

== Bibliography ==
=== Books by Manfred Kelkel ===
==== General works ====
- À la découverte de la musique polynésienne traditionnelle (in French). Paris: P.O.F. 1981. p. 143. ISBN 2-716-90155-4.
- Naturalisme, vérisme et réalisme dans l'opéra (in French). Paris: Éditions Vrin. 1984. pp. 532. ISBN 978-2-7116-4253-3.
- Alexandre Scriabine (in French). Paris: Fayard. 1988. p. 418.
- Musique des mondes : essai sur la métamusique (in French). Paris: Vrin. 1988. p. 240. ISBN 978-2-7116-4263-2.
- La musique de ballet en France de la Belle époque aux Années folles (in French). Paris: Vrin. 1992. p. 330. ISBN 978-2-7116-4273-1.

==== Monographs ====
- Manfred Kelkel (1985). Le mythe de la fatalité dans Le pauvre matelot de Jean Cocteau et Darius Milhaud (in French). Paris: Vrin. p. 198. ISBN 2-711-64257-7.
- Manfred Kelkel (1989). Albert Roussel; musique et esthétique (in French). Paris: Vrin. p. 352. ISBN 2-7116-4267-4.
- Manfred Kelkel (1999). Alexandre Scriabine; un musicien à la recherche de l'absolu (in French). Paris: Fayard. p. 412. ISBN 2-213-60365-0.

=== Works about Manfred Kelkel ===
- Jean-Jacques Velly (2001). Le dessous des notes : voies vers l'ésosthétique. Hommage au professeur Manfred Kelkel (in French). Paris: Presses Paris Sorbonne. p. 442. ISBN 2-84050-209-7. ISSN 1275-2622.
  Jean-Jacques Velly. Préface (in French). pp. 5–15.
  Jacques Viret (2001). "L'alchimiste des sons : Manfred Kelkel compositeur" (in French). pp. 251–263.
  Jean-Jacques Velly. De la tradition classique aux spéculations ésotériques (in French). pp. 286–295.
  Philippe Reynal (2001). In memoriam Manfred Kelkel (in French). pp. 391–393.

=== Sources ===
- Philippe G. Kerbellec (1988). Comment lire Raymond Roussel: cryptanalyse (in French). Paris: Éditions Pauvert. p. 264. ISBN 978-2-876-97035-9.
