= Vers la flamme =

Piano piece by Alexander Scriabin

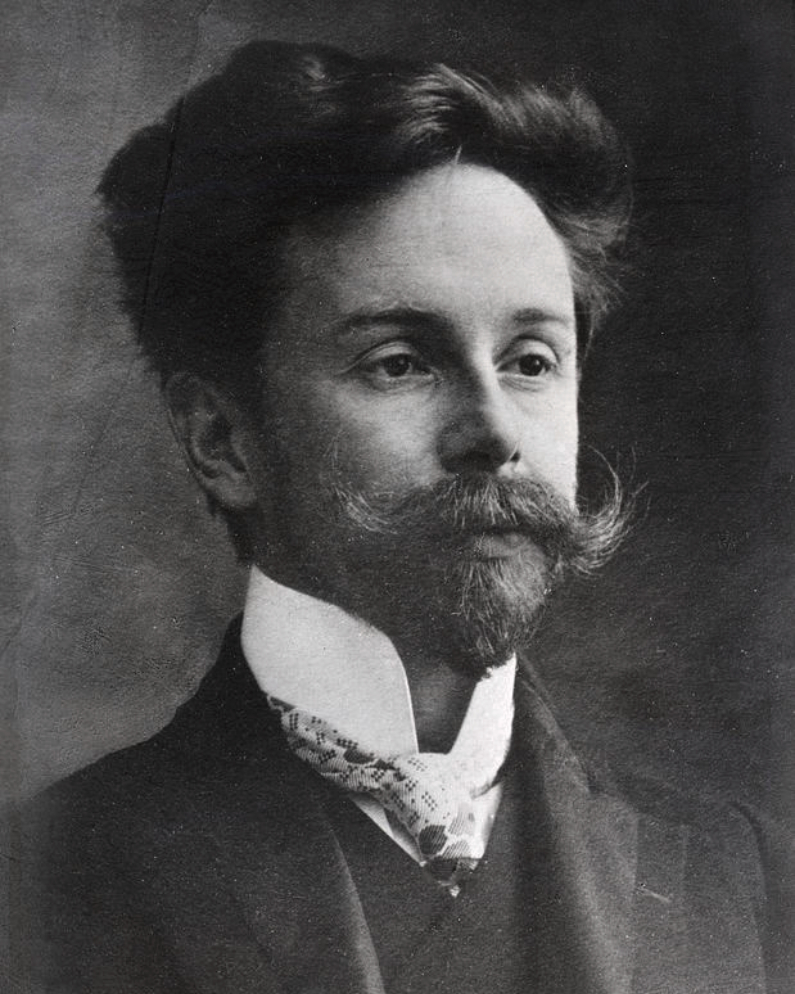
Alexander Scriabin in 1909

Vers la flamme (Toward the flame), Op. 72, is one of Alexander Scriabin's last pieces for piano, written in 1914.

The main motif of the piece consists of descending half steps or whole steps interspersed with impressionistic representations of fire. The piece was originally intended to be Scriabin's eleventh sonata; however, he had to publish it early because of financial concerns, and hence he labelled it a poem rather than a sonata. Like many of Scriabin's late works, the piece does not conform to classical harmony and is instead built on the mystic chord and modal transpositions of its tone center. A typical performance last 5 to 6 minutes. The piece is notorious for its difficulty, in particular the enormous leaps and long, unusual double-note trills in the final pages.

According to pianist Vladimir Horowitz, the piece was inspired by Scriabin's eccentric conviction that a constant accumulation of heat would ultimately cause the destruction of the world. The piece's title reflects the earth's fiery destruction, and the constant emotional buildup and crescendo throughout the piece lead, ultimately, "toward the flame". The piece has also been compared to Louis Brassin's piano transcription of Wagner's "Magic Fire Music" from Die Walkure.

The piece was premiered on 14 March 1915 in Kharkiv, with Scriabin himself at the piano. Notable pianists who have performed and championed the work include Horowitz, Sviatoslav Richter, Vladimir Ashkenazy, Arcadi Volodos, Grigory Sokolov, Vladimir Sofronitsky, Ruth Laredo, Heinrich Neuhaus, Stanislav Neuhaus and Igor Zhukov.

The piece has been orchestrated by composer-conductor Arkady Leytush. In 2018 Andrey Kasparov produced a treatment for piano duo.
