= Zara Levina =

Zara Levina Зара Левина
- Born: 5 February 1906 [O.S. 25 January] Simferopol, Russian Empire (present-day Ukraine)
- Died: 27 June 1976 (aged 70) Moscow, Russian SFSR, Soviet Union
- Genres: Classical
- Occupations: Pianist; composer
- Instrument: Piano

Zara Aleksandrovna Levina (Note: Russian: Зара Александровна Левина, romanized: Zara Aleksandrovna Levina; Ukrainian: Зара Олександрівна Левіна, romanized: Zara Oleksandrivna Levina) (5 February 1906 [O.S. 25 January] – 27 June 1976) was a Soviet pianist and composer.

Levina was born in Simferopol on 5 February 1906 and was brought up in a Jewish family. She studied piano at the Odessa Conservatory, which she passed with a gold medal. She graduated from the Moscow Conservatory in 1932, where she studied piano and composition.

Levina mainly wrote choral works (mostly romances and children's songs) among other vocal music, as well as two piano concertos and solo piano works. Motifs can be heard throughout her works from famous composers – Rachmaninoff, Scriabin, Prokofiev, Beethoven and Schumann – composers whom she had admired since young. Both of her piano concertos have been recorded, as has her 1928 first violin sonata (by David Oistrakh). She was married to the composer Nikolai Chemberdzhi (1903–1948). She died on 27 June 1976 in Moscow, aged 70. She was the grandmother of pianist Alexander Melnikov as well as pianist and composer Katia Tchemberdji.

== Recordings ==
- 2017 Zara Levina: The Piano Concertos, Capriccio C5269
  - Rundfunk-Sinfonieorchester Berlin, Ariane Matiakh, conductor; Maria Lettberg, piano soloist
- 2019 Zara Levina: Piano Sonatas Nos. 1 & 2; Violin Sonata; Poeme; Canzonetta; Hebrew Rhapsody, Capriccio C5356
  - Maria Lettberg, piano; Yury Revich, violin; Gernot Adrion, viola; Ringela Riemke, cello; Katia Tchemberdji, piano
