= Lucinda Collins =

Lucinda Collins is an Australian pianist, educator and chamber musician, who is currently head of piano at Australia's senior musical academy, the Elder Conservatorium of Music.

== Biography ==
Lucinda Collins has performed widely throughout Australia, as well as giving numerous broadcasts for ABC Classic FM. After undergraduate study at the Elder Conservatorium under German pianist Professor Stefan Ammer, and Noreen Stokes, in 1984 she was awarded the Elder Overseas Scholarship in Music by the Elder Conservatorium of Music to study at the Royal College of Music under Peter Wallfisch in London. She has given concerts in the United Kingdom and Korea.

By July 1997 Collins was a lecturer in piano at the Elder Conservatorium of Music. Since 2000 She has held the position of head of piano and coordinates the chamber music program.

In addition to solo repertoire, Collins has worked extensively as a chamber musician and has partnered many distinguished artists including internationally acclaimed cellists David Geringas and Lynn Harrell. She has also performed with William Hennessy on violin: The Age's Clive O'Connell described Collins and Hennessy's playing of César Franck's Sonata in A major for Violin and Piano in July 1997, "[it] is well, suited to a player of his character, the slashing strokes and powerful chromatic colors getting a solid hearing, in which Collins took equal honors."

Collins performed with the Australian String Quartet and they toured nationally in March 2010. She collaborated with the quartet in 2017 to perform Ernő Dohnányi's Piano Quintet No. 1, Op. 1 in C minor, alongside appearing as soloist with the Melbourne Chamber Orchestra performing Mozart's G major Concerto, K. 453.
