= Yekaterina Chemberdzhi =

Russian composer (born 1960)

Yekaterina Chemberdzhi (Russian: Екатерина Владимировна Чемберджи́), also Katia Tchemberdji (nickname) or Jekaterina Wladimirowna Tschemberdschi (German form) (born 6 May 1960), is a Russian pianist and composer.

== Life and career ==
The daughter of Vladimir Posner and Valentina Chemberdzhi and granddaughter of the composers Zara Levina and Nikolai Chemberdzhi, Katia Chemberdzhi was born in Moscow and began her study of music at age 7. In 1978 she studied composition and piano at the Moscow Conservatory with Nikolai Korndorf and Yuri Kholopov.

After ending her studies, Chemberdzhi took a position from 1984 to 1990 teaching at the Moscow Gnessin State Musical College. In 1990 she moved to West Berlin. She has been active in international festivals as a pianist and as a composer. Her compositions were commissioned by such festivals as Berliner Festspiele, Kuhmo Chamber Music Festival, Tage Neuer Musik Zürich, and performed and commissioned by such soloists and ensembles as The Hilliard Ensamble, Charoun Ensemble, Sibelius Quartet, Staats- und Domchor Berlin, Singakademie zu Berlin, Münchner Kammerorchester, Boris Pergamenschikow, Natalia Gutman, Eduard Brunner, Charles Neidich etc. She has composed film music for several Russian and German films.

== Works ==
Selected works include:

- 1990: Sonate for clarinet and piano
- 1991: Heidelberg Trio, for clarinet, violin and piano
- 1991: In memoriam, for storyteller, piano, horn, violin and cello after poems by Anna Akhmatova
- 1991: In Namen Amadeus, for viola, clarinet, piano and tape
- 1995: Day and night: Hommage à M. C. Escher, for solo piano
- 1996: Labyrinth in memoriam Oleg Kagan, for string orchestra (3 quartets) and solo cello
- 1998: Max and Moritz, chamber opera after William Busch
- 2000: String Quartet No. 2, after Rainer Maria Rilke
- 2003: Opposition, for ensemble
- 2003: Three Bow Dances, for cello and piano
- 2003: Ma´or, for solo clarinet
- 2006: Abschiedsgesänge, for four vocal soloists and chamber orchestra after poems of Rainer Maria Rilke and Apollonius Rhodius
- 2007: Rettet Pluto!, Kinderoper
- 2009: Die Fragen des Bartholomäus, for five solo singers, choir, organ and orchestra

== Selected Recordings ==
Chamber Works
