= Stefan Ammer =

German-Austrian pianist and music professor (born 1942)

- Born: 13 July 1942 (age 84)
- Education: Hochschule für Musik Freiburg
- Occupations: Pianist, teacher
- Years active: 1967–present

Stefan Ammer (born 13 July 1942) is a German-Australian pianist, lecturer, teacher and professor of music. A former professor at Hochschule für Musik Freiburg in Germany, and currently at the Elder Conservatorium of Music in Australia.

== Biography ==
Ammer studied a master's degree in piano from the Hochschule für Musik Freiburg, and has been recognised as one of the foremost musical educators and respected pianists in Germany and Australia. Ammer's pedagogical lineage can be traced back to Ludwig van Beethoven: Hans Leygraf – Boon – Schnabel – Leschetizky – Czerny – Beethoven.

Until Ammer's appointment as a senior lecturer of piano at Australia's senior musical academy – the Elder Conservatorium of Music, at the University of Adelaide – he was a professor at the Hochschule für Musik Freiburg in Germany. His chamber music experience led to the collaboration with some of the finest contemporary musicians, including Wanda Wiłkomirska, Nigel Kennedy, Ronald Woodcock, Florian Ammer, Gunnars Larson, Friedrich Gauwerky and Janis Laurs. As a triopartner, Ammer has performed almost the entire piano trio repertoire. Ammer and his family left Germany in 1984, and settled in Australia, leading to his special interest in contemporary Australian music.

As a soloist and accompanist, Ammer has played programs with new Australian works in Europe, Asia and Australia, and has recorded at radio stations in Germany, Switzerland and Australia. Ammer has been performing duets with noted clarinetist Peter Handsworth across Australia, commencing in 2009, when ABC Classic FM produced a show with Handsworth and Ammer, and in 2010 both premiered new works for clarinet and piano at Bayerischer Rundfunk in Munich. In 2015, as a part of The Scriabin Project Concert Series, Ammer joined forces alongside his pupils Mekhla Kumar, Konstantin Shamray and Ashley Hribar to honour Russian composer Alexander Scriabin, at various venues across Australia.

Ammer's pupils include Kristian Chong, Konstantin Shamray, Lucinda Collins, Shueh-li Ong, and Mekhla Kumar.
