= Mekhla Kumar =

Australian pianist

Mekhla Kumar is an Australian virtuoso pianist and chamber musician.

== Early life and education ==
Mekhla Kumar was born in Adelaide, South Australia. She began studying piano at the age of four.

After graduating from Wilderness School in 2007, Kumar gained a place at the University of Adelaide's Elder Conservatorium of Music, in the class of German-Australian professor Stefan Ammer, where she completed a Bachelor of Music and graduated with distinction. At Hochschule für Musik Freiburg, she studied under Tibor Szász.

In 2016, Kumar was working on a PhD at the University of Adelaide on Franz Liszt's Sonata in B minor.

== Career ==
Kumar has performed as a soloist with the Elder Conservatorium Symphony Orchestra and has participated in master classes with Roy Howat, Bart van Oort, Leslie Howard, Imogen Cooper, Bernd Glemser, Claudio Martinez Mahner and Robert Hill, and played alongside Marc-André Hamelin and Konstantin Shamray.

Kumar has performed in Germany and Australia, including live radio performances in Germany. Her performances include an arrangement made for her chamber music ensemble of Igor Stravinsky's The Rite of Spring, the rarely performed Linea by Luciano Berio, a solo recital at the Bach Festival in Adelaide, a solo performance with the Adelaide Youth Orchestra, and a solo performance for the Posthumous Composer in Residence series at Elder Hall in Adelaide.

In 2015, she collaborated with Estonian-born bassoon virtuoso, Martin Kuuskmann, and the Langbein Quartet at the Port Fairy Spring Music Festival and at Elder Hall in celebration of the centenary of Scriabin's death, alongside Konstantin Shamray, Ashley Hribar, and master pianist, Stefan Ammer.

== Recognition and awards ==
Kumar has been a recipient of the Principal's Scholarship, the Patrick Cecil Greenland Scholarship, the EMR travelling Scholarship and was awarded the Rotary Club of Burnside's "Carpe Diem" Trust. Other awards and recognition include:

- 2012: "Emerging Artist Award" from the Elder Conservatorium and the Helpmann Academy
- 2012: Trant from the Ian Potter Cultural Trust
- 2019 Geoffrey Parsons Award, Accompanists' Guild of South Australia
