= Kristian Chong =

Australian concert pianist

Kristian Chong is an Australian concert pianist.

== Early life and education ==
His early studies were at the Elder Conservatorium of Music in Adelaide, South Australia, where he was accepted at the age of nine on piano with Stefan Ammer and Noreen Stokes, and violin with Beryl Kimber. He went on to study at the Melbourne Conservatorium of Music under Stephen McIntyre, and then the Royal Academy of Music in London with Piers Lane and Christopher Elton.

His early competition successes included the Symphony Australia Young Performers Award (keyboard) and the Australian National Piano Award.

== Career ==
Chong has performed extensively throughout Australia and the UK, and in China, France, Hong Kong, New Zealand, Singapore, Taiwan, USA, and Zimbabwe.

As concerto soloist, he has appeared with the Adelaide, Canberra, Melbourne, Queensland, Sydney and Tasmanian symphony orchestras, and orchestras in the UK, New Zealand and China under conductors such as Werner Andreas Albert, Andrey Boreyko, Nicholas Braithwaite, Jessica Cottis, Roy Goodman, Sebastian Lang-Lessing, Nicholas Milton, Benjamin Northey, Tuomas Ollila, Fabian Russell, Markus Stenz, Arvo Volmer and Marco Zuccarini

Concerto highlights have included Rachmaninoff 3rd with the Sydney Symphony, the Rachmaninoff Rhapsody on a Theme of Paganini in Beijing and Canberra, and Britten with the Adelaide Symphony Orchestra. Recent concerto highlights include Rachmaninoff 3rd, Chopin 2nd, Beethoven's Emperor, Ravel's Left Hand concerto in Melbourne and New Zealand, Saint-Saêns 2nd and Rachmaninoff's Paganini Rhapsody with the Melbourne Symphony Orchestra and Malcolm Williamson's 2nd concerto with the Canberra Symphony Orchestra.

Chong is particularly renowned as a chamber musician, having performed often with musicians such as the Tinalley String Quartet and the Australian String Quartet, violinists Rebecca Chan, Sophie Rowell, Dale Barltrop, Jack Liebeck , Daniel Dodds, Jack Liebeck and Satu Vänskä, violist Christopher Moore, mezzo soprano Caitlin Hulcup, clarinettist Philip Arkinstall, cellist Li-Wei Qin, flautist Megan Sterling and baritone Teddy Tahu Rhodes, with whom he has recorded for ABC Classics. Other collaborations include violinists Ilya Konovalov, (concertmaster Israel Philharmonic), Adam Chalabi, Alexandre Da Costa and Vadim Gluzman, and clarinettist and Michael Collins, among many others.

Festival performances include the Australian Festival of Chamber Music in 2026 and 2022, 2026 Canberra Festival, the Huntington Estate Music Festival for Musica Viva Australia, Oxford May Music Festival in 2025, the Adelaide Festival, Adelaide International Cello Festival, the Xing Hai Festival in Guangzhou, the Port Fairy Spring Music Festival, the Mimir Chamber Music Festival and the Bangalow Festival. He also completed a cycle of the complete Beethoven piano and violin sonatas with Natsuko Yoshimoto and Sophie Rowell at the Melbourne Recital Centre and is director of the chamber music series (at the Melbourne Recital Centre) 'Kristian Chong and Friends' since 2013.

Chong has recorded the complete Rachmaninoff Preludes for piano, to be released shortly, and his recent recordings including the Brahms Op. 120 Sonatas for Clarinet and Piano with Philip Arkinstall for Move Records, and with flautist Megan Sterling, a disc titled 'Silver Skies' with works by Miriam Hyde, Anne Boyd, Carl Vine, Frank Martin, Francis Poulenc and Philippe Gaubert on the Azure Sky Records label.

He is based in Melbourne, and teaches piano and chamber music at the Faculty of Fine Arts and Music, University of Melbourne.
