= The Poem of Ecstasy =

1908 symphonic poem written by Alexander Scriabin

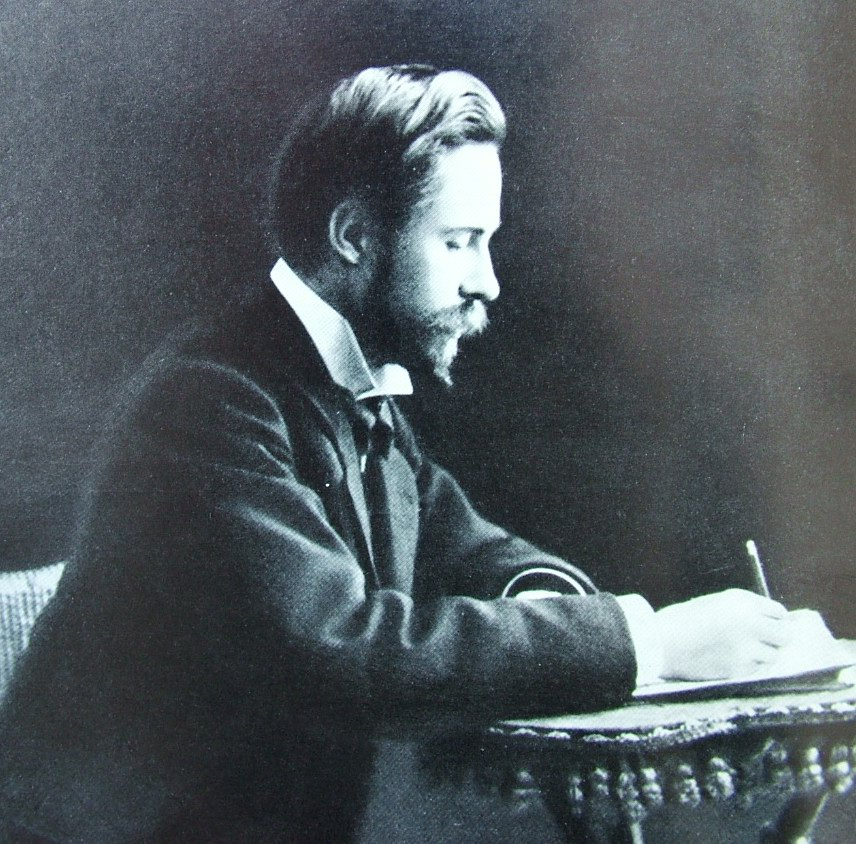
Scriabin (1905)

The Poem of Ecstasy (Le Poème de l'extase), Op. 54, is a symphonic poem by Russian composer and pianist Alexander Scriabin written between 1905 and 1908, when Scriabin was actively involved with the Theosophical Society. The 20-minute work premiered on 10 December 1908 in New York City.

== Music ==
Scriabin sometimes called The Poem of Ecstasy his "fourth symphony", but it was never officially named that and avoids the traditional division into separate movements. There are traces of the classical sonata key-scheme that Scriabin had employed previously, but it is no longer structurally important. Bernard Jacobson writes, "The form depends instead on the constant interpenetration and cross-fertilization of a multiplicity of tiny thematic units, most of them so sinuously chromatic as to subvert tonal feeling almost entirely beneath the vertiginous onslaught of shifting harmonic colors."

Much of the work has a feeling of timelessness and suspense, because of its rhythmic ambiguity and whole-tone-based dominant harmonies derived from Scriabin's "mystic chord." (Since the whole-tone scale has no leading tones, any harmony based on it will not lean toward any key in particular, allowing Scriabin to write pages of music with little to no tonal resolution)

The work can be split into three major theme groups: one characterized by slower chromatic winding, one faster and more agitated group characterized by quick leaps and trills, and one featuring three themes presented by the brass (a horn fanfare to provide a rhythmic motif, a trumpet fanfare emerging from the surrounding texture, and a more lyrical trumpet theme). These groups are presented separately at the outset and then developed and combined in various ways. The piece builds to two major climaxes: one in the middle and one at the end. Both are built on themes from the third group and accompanied by string and woodwind tremolos and trills. At the second climax, Scriabin introduces low bells and organ, and maintains a trumpet and percussion ostinato throughout.

Scriabin wrote a poem to accompany the music, though not to be recited with it. It tracks a spirit's ascent into consciousness, catalyzed by the recurring appearance of "trembling presentiments of dark rhythms" that transform into "bright presentiments of shining rhythms" as the spirit realizes the excitement of the struggle against them, contrasted with the "boredom, melancholy, and emptiness" felt after victory over them. The ascent into consciousness is illustrated by the gradual shift from third-person "Spirit" to first person "I". Scriabin also based his fifth piano sonata on the poem, and in the first publication of the sonata he included the following lines:

Le Poême de l’Extase, French translation by Joseph Belleau, property of Alexander Scriabin; gifted to pianist Marc-André Hamelin by the widow of Canadian pianist and Scriabin's close friend Alfred La Liberté

Я к жизни призываю вас, скрытые стремленья!
Вы, утонувшие в темных глубинах
Духа творящего, вы, боязливые
Жизни зародыши, вам дерзновенье приношу

Je vous appelle à la vie, ô forces mystérieuses!
Noyées dans les obscures profondeurs
De l’esprit créateur, craintives
Ébauches de vie, à vous j’apporte l’audace!

I call you to life, oh mysterious forces!
Drowned in the obscure depths
Of the creative spirit, timid
Shadows of life, to you I bring audacity!

He approved the following text for the program notes at the premiere:

The Poem of Ecstasy is the Joy of Liberated Action. The Cosmos, i.e., Spirit, is Eternal Creation without External Motivation, a Divine Play of Worlds. The Creative Spirit, i.e., the Universe at Play, is not conscious of the Absoluteness of its creativeness, having subordinated itself to a Finality and made creativity a means toward an end. The stronger the pulse beat of life and the more rapid the precipitation of rhythms, the more clearly the awareness comes to the Spirit that it is consubstantial with creativity itself. When the Spirit has attained the supreme culmination of its activity and has been torn away from the embraces of teleology and relativity, when it has exhausted completely its substance and its liberated active energy, the Time of Ecstasy shall arrive.

Modest Altschuler, who helped Scriabin revise the score in Switzerland in 1907 and conducted the premiere with the Russian Symphony Orchestra of New York on 10 December 1908, reported that Scriabin's implied program (which does not appear in the score) is based on three main ideas: his soul in the orgy of love, the realization of a fantastical dream, and the glory of his own art.

== Instrumentation ==
The work is scored as follows.

Woodwinds

3 flutes
piccolo
3 oboes
English horn
3 clarinets
bass clarinet
3 bassoons
contrabassoon

Brass

8 horns
5 trumpets
3 trombones
tuba

Percussion

timpani

bass drum
cymbals
triangle
glockenspiel
bells
tam-tam

Keyboards

celesta
organ (or harmonium)

Strings

2 harps

1st violins
2nd violins
violas
cellos
double basses

== In literature and film ==
Henry Miller made reference to this symphony in Nexus, the third volume of The Rosy Crucifixion:

That Poème de l'extase? Put it on loud. His music sounds like I think – sometimes. Has that far-off cosmic itch. Divinely fouled up. All fire and air. The first time I heard it I played it over and over. (...) It was like a bath of ice, cocaine and rainbows. For weeks I went about in a trance. Something had happened to me. (...) Every time a thought seized me a little door would open inside my chest, and there, in this comfy little nest sat a bird, the sweetest, gentlest bird imaginable. 'Think it out!' he would chirp. 'Think it out to the end!' And I would, by God. Never any effort involved. Like an étude gliding off a glacier.

In the 1987 film Barfly, the work can be heard in one scene.
