= Ludwig Hupfeld =

German musical instrument maker and industrialist

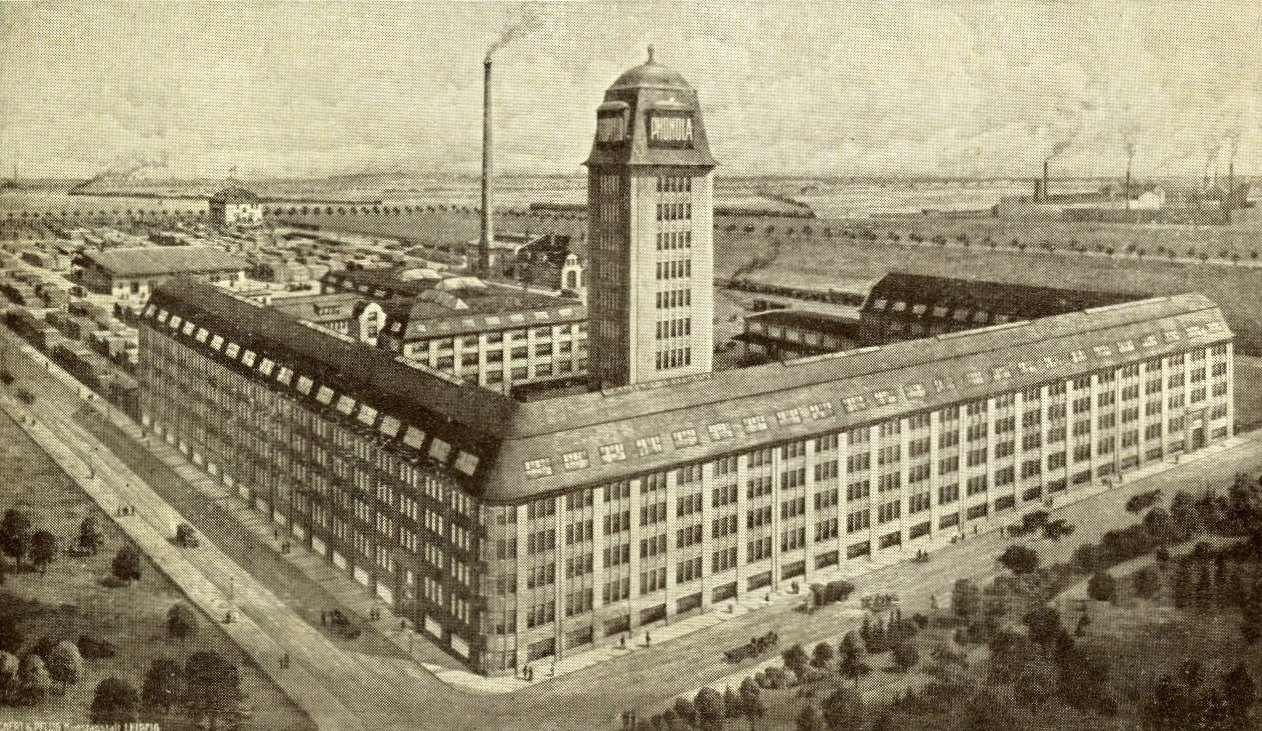
Ludwig Hupfeld factory in 1911 in Böhlitz-Ehrenberg, Leipzig

Ludwig Hupfeld (26 November 1864 – 8 October 1949) was a German musical instrument maker and industrialist.

== Life and work ==
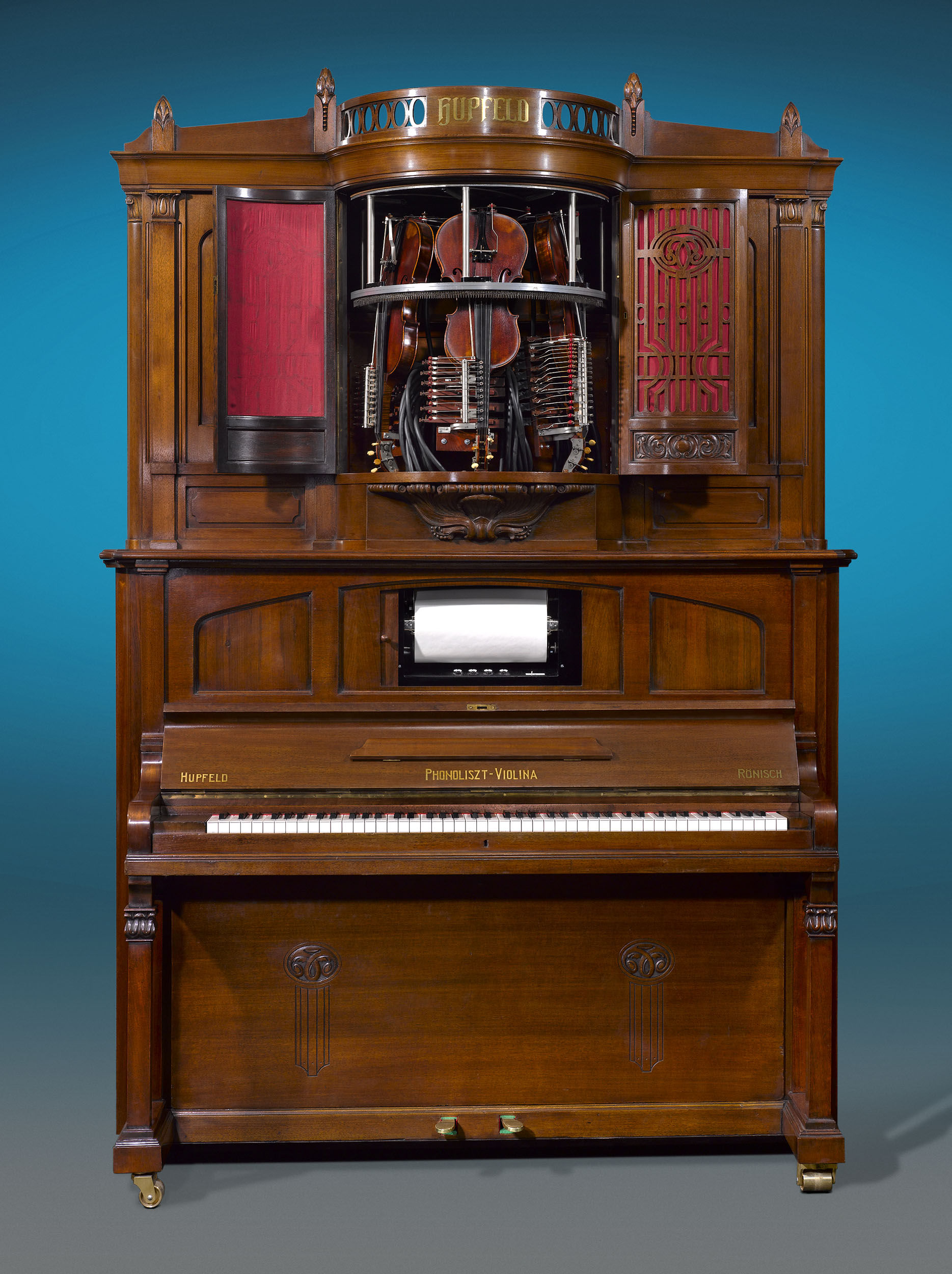
Hupfeld Phonoliszt-Violina Model B music cabinet with three self-playing violins and a self-playing piano

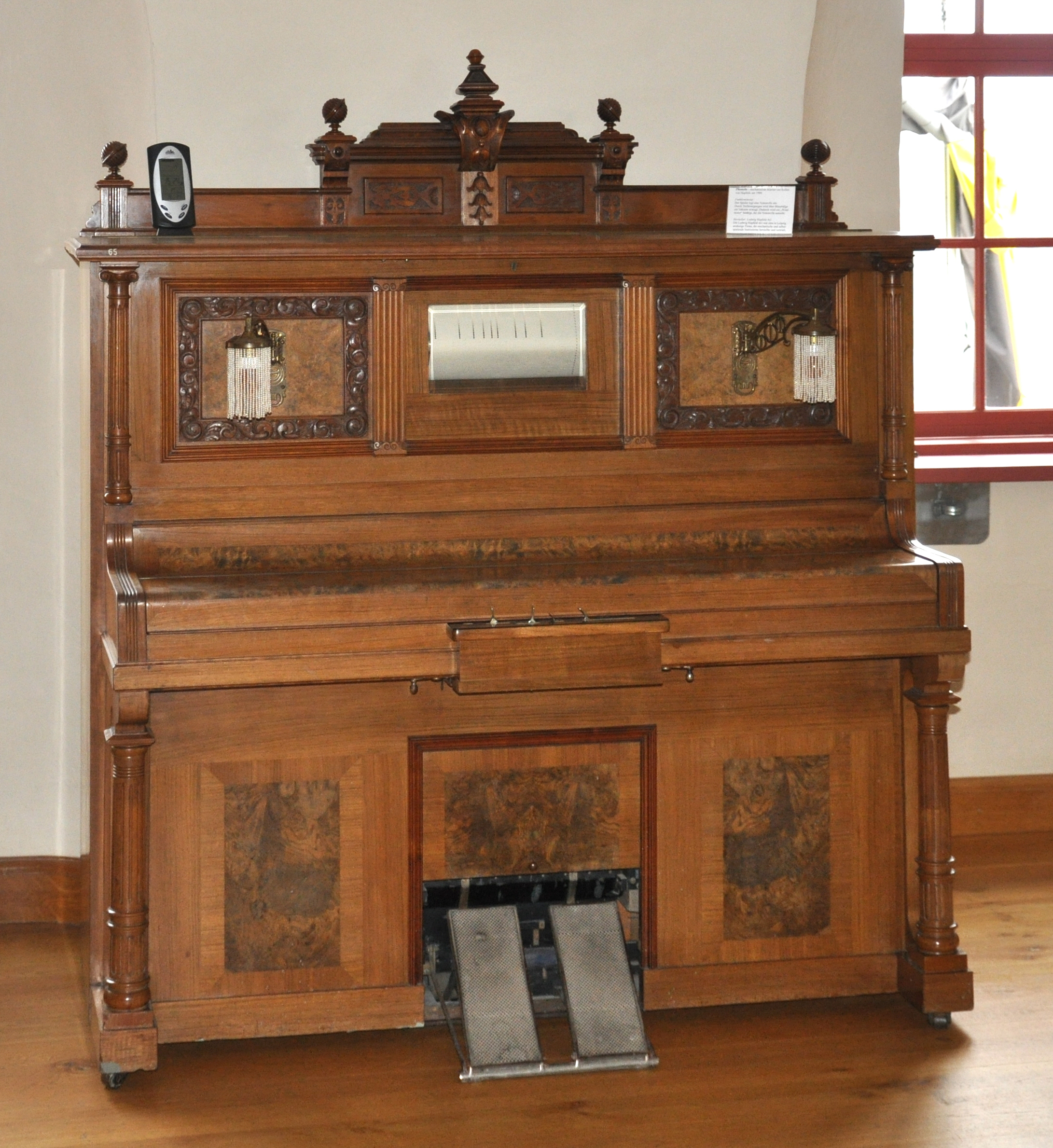
Ludwig Hupfeld AG Phonola of 1900 (the Castle Voigtsberg in Oelsnitz Vogtland)

Hupfeld was born in Maberzell (now Fulda in Hesse), Electorate of Hesse.

Hupfeld attended the Royal Grammar School in Fulda and undertook commercial training in Cologne.

In 1892 he acquired the music trade company J. M. Grob & Co., based in Leipzig which was originally a music shop and manufacturer of mechanical instruments such as music boxes.

After taking over the company, the name was changed to Hupfeld Musical Instrument Works. When the company was converted to a corporation in 1904, the name of the company became Ludwig Hupfeld AG.

In 1911, the company moved to Leipzig, to a large factory in Böhlitz-Ehrenberg. Over the years, Hupfeld bought up several piano-manufacturers, including the Carl Rönisch company. In 1925 following a merger with the Zimmerman company, Ludwig Hupfeld AG led the industry in Europe. In the 1920s, the company was the largest European manufacturer of mechanical musical works.

One of the most popular products since 1902 was the self-playing piano Phonola American, the European counterpart of the pianola. Hupfeld had some success with the 1908 reproducing piano DEA, which was later superseded by the more successful Triphonola. The mechanical violin Violina, an orchestrion, despite an ingenious design, was seen as aesthetically unsatisfactory and therefore less successful. Nevertheless by 1930 some 3500 had been built. The instrument contained three violins which could be pressed against a circular bow by a bellows; just one string on each violin played, the note being determined by 'fingers' that were also controlled by bellows. The mechanism was controlled by punched paper rolls, in the same way as the piano section.

During World War II, the company made ammunition boxes and fuel tanks in the factory. At the end of the war, as an ex-arms manufacturer, it was made a state-owned enterprise by the communist authorities of East Germany in 1949. The company was renamed VEB Deutsche Pianounion and continued to produce pianos under the brand name Hupfeld.

Hupfeld died in Leipzig on 8 October 1949, and was buried in the Leipzig South Cemetery in his family tomb, where he was joined in 1953 by his wife Elisabeth (née Beyer, born 1874).

== Sources ==
- Zeitschrift für Instrumentenbau, vol 37, 1916-1917, p. 290 -292
