= Alexander Scriabin =

Russian composer and pianist (1872–1915)

- Александр Скрябин
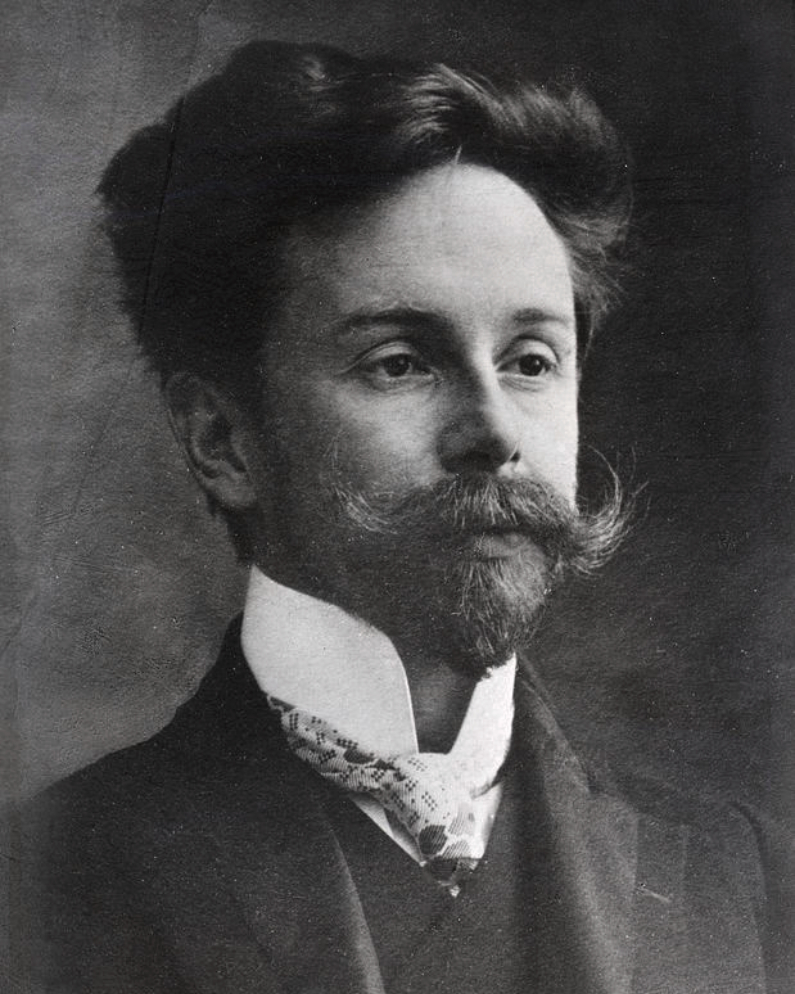
- Scriabin in 1909
- Born: 6 January 1872; Moscow, Russia
- Died: 27 April 1915 (aged 43); Moscow, Russia
- Education: Second Moscow Cadet Corps
- Occupations: Composer; pianist
- Works: List of compositions

Alexander Nikolayevich Scriabin (Note: /skriˈɑːbɪn/, UK also /skriˈæbɪn/; Russian: Александр Николаевич Скрябин, romanized: Aleksandr Nikolayevich Skryabin, IPA: [ɐlʲɪˈksandr nʲɪkɐˈla(j)ɪvʲɪtɕ ˈskrʲæbʲɪn]. In this name that follows East Slavic naming customs, the patronymic is Nikolayevich and the family name is Scriabin. Scriabin is the established English spelling. The French spelling Scriabine is also common in sheet music and literature, as the composer and his publisher Mitrofan Belyayev frequently used it.) (6 January 1872 [O.S. 25 December 1871] – 27 April [O.S. 14 April] 1915) was a Russian composer and pianist. Initially influenced by Frédéric Chopin, he composed in a relatively tonal, late-Romantic idiom. Later, independently of his contemporary Arnold Schoenberg, Scriabin developed a highly dissonant musical language that transcended traditional tonality without being strictly atonal, aligning with his personal brand of metaphysics. He embraced the concepts of Gesamtkunstwerk and synesthesia, creating a colour-coded circle of fifths inspired by theosophy to associate colours with harmonies. Scriabin is widely considered the primary Russian symbolist composer and a major figure of the Silver Age of Russian Poetry.

Scriabin was an innovator and one of the most controversial composer-pianists of the early 20th century. The Great Soviet Encyclopedia said of him, "no composer has had more scorn heaped on him or greater love bestowed." Leo Tolstoy described Scriabin's music as "a sincere expression of genius." Scriabin's oeuvre exerted a salient influence on the music world over time, and inspired many composers, such as Nikolai Roslavets and Karol Szymanowski. His musical aesthetics have been reevaluated since the 1970s, and his ten published sonatas for piano and other works have been increasingly championed, garnering significant acclaim.

== Biography ==
=== Childhood and education (1871–1893) ===
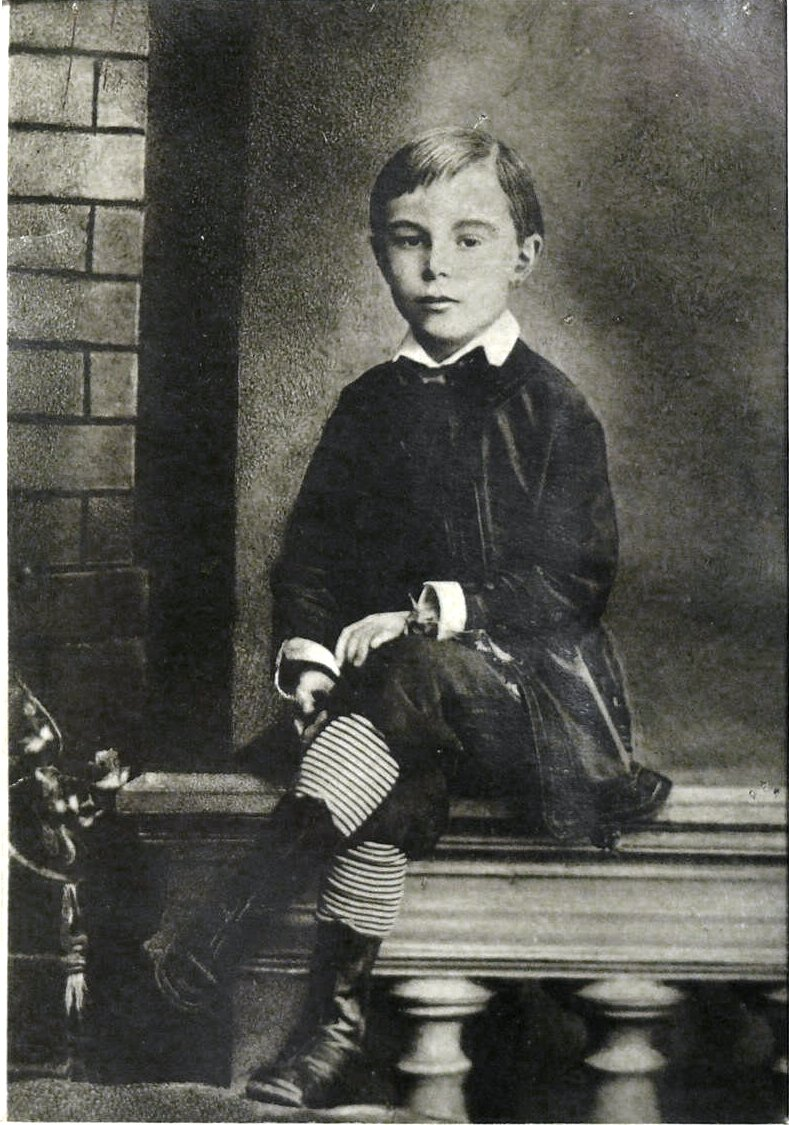
Scriabin as a child

Scriabin was born in Moscow into a Russian noble family on Christmas Day, 1871, according to the Julian calendar. His father, Nikolai Aleksandrovich Scriabin, then a student at the Moscow State University, belonged to a modest noble family founded by Scriabin's great-grandfather Ivan Alekseevich Scriabin, a soldier from Tula who had a brilliant military career and was granted hereditary nobility in 1819. Alexander's paternal grandmother, Elizaveta Ivanovna Podchertkova, daughter of a captain lieutenant, came from a wealthy noble house of the Novgorod Governorate. His mother, Lyubov Petrovna Scriabina (née Schetinina), was a concert pianist and a former student of Theodor Leschetizky. She belonged to an ancient dynasty that traced its history back to Rurik; its founder, Semyon Feodorovich Yaroslavskiy, nicknamed Schetina (from the Russian schetina meaning stubble), was the great-grandson of Vasili, Prince of Yaroslavl. She died of tuberculosis when Alexander was a year old.

After her death, Nikolai Scriabin completed tuition in the Turkish language in Saint Petersburg's Institute of Oriental Languages and left for Turkey. Like all his relatives, Nikolai followed a military path and served as a military attaché in the status of Active State Councillor; he was appointed an honorary consul in Lausanne during his later years. Nikolai left the infant Sasha (as he was known) with his grandmother, great-aunt, and aunt. Scriabin's father later remarried, giving Scriabin a number of half-brothers and sisters. His aunt Lyubov (his father's unmarried sister) was an amateur pianist who documented Sasha's early life until he met his first wife. As a child, Scriabin was frequently exposed to piano playing; anecdotal references describe him demanding that his aunt play for him.

Apparently precocious, Scriabin began building pianos after becoming fascinated with piano mechanisms. He sometimes gave houseguests pianos he had built. Lyubov portrays Scriabin as very shy and unsociable with his peers, but appreciative of adult attention. According to one anecdote, Scriabin tried to conduct an orchestra composed of local children, an attempt that ended in frustration and tears. He performed his own plays and operas with puppets to willing audiences. He studied the piano from an early age, taking lessons with Nikolai Zverev, a strict disciplinarian, who was also the teacher of Sergei Rachmaninoff and other piano prodigies, though Scriabin never lodged with Zverev as Rachmaninoff did.

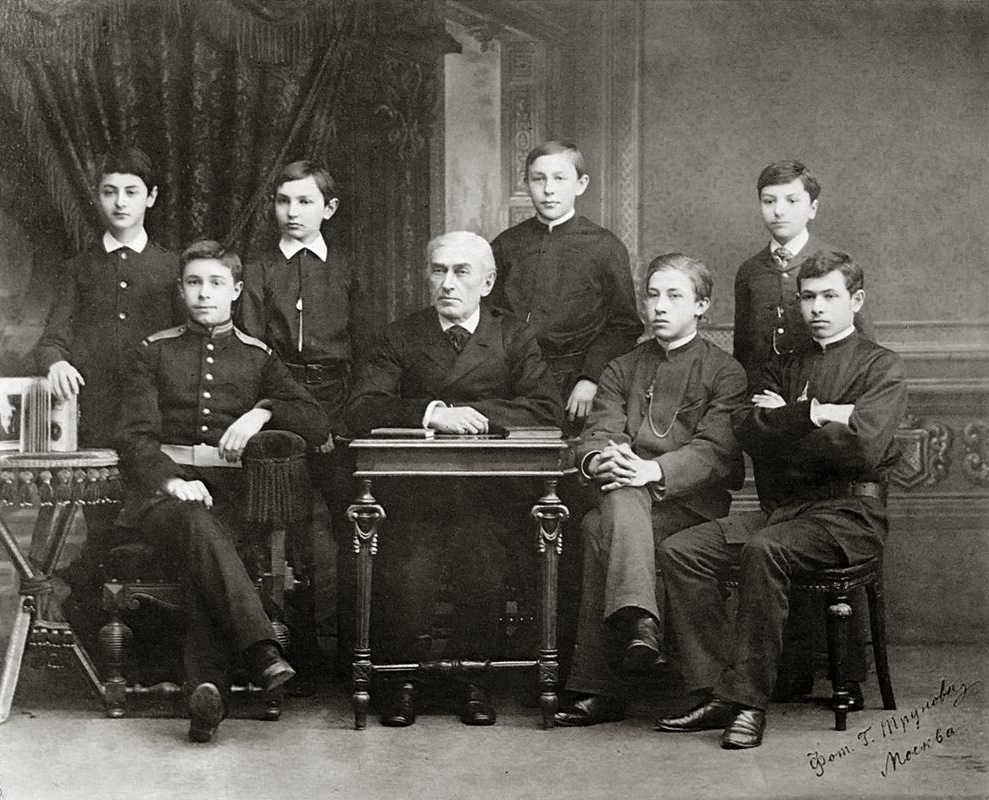
Zverev's students in the late 1880s. Scriabin, with military attire, is second from the left. Rachmaninoff is the fourth from the right.

In 1882, Scriabin enlisted in the Second Moscow Cadet Corps. As a student, he became friends with the actor Leonid Limontov, who in his memoirs recalls his reluctance to become friends with Scriabin, who was the smallest and weakest among all the boys and sometimes teased due to his stature. But Scriabin won his peers' approval at a concert where he performed on the piano. He ranked generally first in his class academically, but was exempt from drilling due to his physique and given time each day to practice piano.

Scriabin later studied at the Moscow Conservatory under Anton Arensky, Sergei Taneyev, and Vasily Safonov. He became a noted pianist despite his small hands, which could barely stretch to a ninth. Feeling challenged by Josef Lhévinne, Scriabin damaged his right hand while practicing Franz Liszt's Réminiscences de Don Juan and Mily Balakirev's Islamey. His doctor said he would never recover, and Scriabin wrote his first large-scale masterpiece, his Piano Sonata No. 1, Op. 6, as a "cry against God, against fate." It was the third sonata he wrote, but the first to which Scriabin gave an opus number (his second was condensed and released as the Allegro Appassionato, Op. 4). He eventually regained the use of his hand.

In 1892, Scriabin graduated with the Small Gold Medal in piano performance, but did not complete a composition degree because of strong personality and musical differences with Arensky (whose faculty signature is the only one absent from Scriabin's graduation certificate) and an unwillingness to compose pieces in forms that did not interest him.

=== Early career (1894–1903) ===
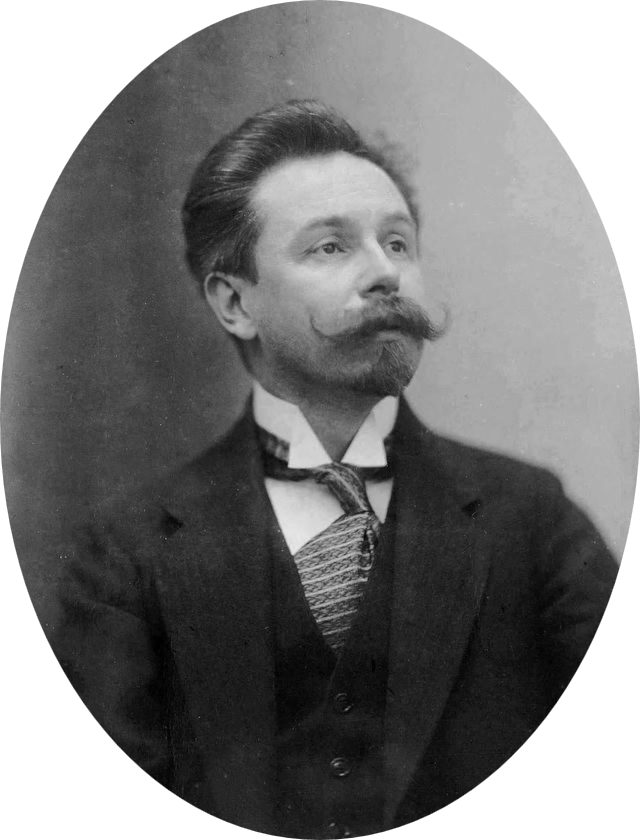
Scriabin in 1900

In 1894, Scriabin made his debut as a pianist in Saint Petersburg, performing his own works to positive reviews. That same year, Mitrofan Belyayev agreed to pay Scriabin to compose for his publishing company (he published works by composers such as Nikolai Rimsky-Korsakov and Alexander Glazunov). In August 1897, Scriabin married pianist Vera Ivanovna Isakovich, and then toured in Russia and abroad, culminating in a successful 1898 concert in Paris. That year, he became a teacher at the Moscow Conservatory and began to establish his reputation as a composer. During this period, Scriabin composed his cycle of études, Op. 8, several sets of preludes, his first three piano sonatas, and his only piano concerto, among other works, mostly for piano.

For five years, Scriabin was based in Moscow, during which time his old teacher Safonov conducted the first two of Scriabin's symphonies. According to later reports, between 1901 and 1903, Scriabin envisioned writing an opera. He expounded its ideas in the course of normal conversation. The work would center around a nameless hero, a philosopher-musician-poet. Among other things, he would declare: "I am the apotheosis of world creation. I am the aim of aims, the end of ends." The Poem Op. 32 No. 2 and the Poème tragique Op. 34 were originally conceived as arias in the opera.

=== Leaving Russia (1903–09) ===
By 13 March 1904, Scriabin and his wife had relocated to Geneva, Switzerland. While living there, Scriabin permanently separated from his wife (who refused to grant him a divorce), with whom he had had four children, and began working on his Symphony No. 3. In 1905, the work was performed in Paris, where Scriabin was accompanied by Tatiana Fyodorovna Schlözer—a former pupil and the niece of the pianist and composer Paul de Schlözer and sister of the music critic Boris de Schlözer. Because Scriabin's first wife refused to grant him a divorce, Tatiana became his common-law wife (life partner), with whom he had more children out of wedlock.

With a wealthy sponsor's financial assistance, Scriabin spent several years travelling in Switzerland, Italy, France, Belgium and the United States, working on more orchestral pieces, including several symphonies. He also began to compose "poems" for the piano, a form with which he is particularly associated. While in New York City, in 1907, Scriabin became acquainted with the Canadian composer Alfred La Liberté, who became a personal friend and disciple.

In 1907, Scriabin settled in Lausanne with his family and was involved with a series of concerts organized by the impresario Sergei Diaghilev, who was actively promoting Russian music in the West at the time. Scriabin subsequently relocated to Brussels (rue de la Réforme 45) with his family.

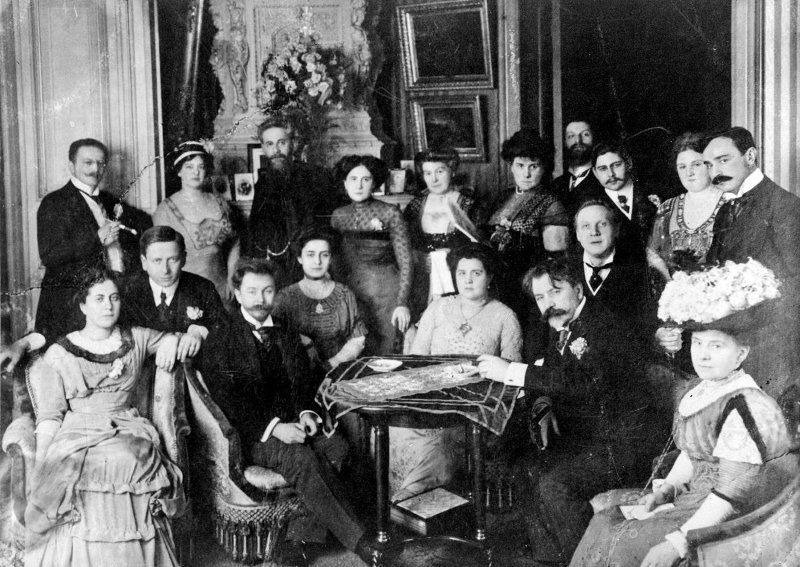
Scriabin (sitting on the left of the table) as a guest at Wladimir Metzl's home in Berlin, 1910

=== Return to Russia (1909–15) ===
In 1909, Scriabin permanently returned to Russia, where he continued to compose, working on increasingly grandiose projects. For some time before his death, Scriabin had planned a multimedia work to be performed in a temple in India. He left only sketches for this piece, Mysterium, although a preliminary part, L'acte préalable ("Prefatory Action"), was eventually made into a performable version by Alexander Nemtin. Part of that unfinished piece was performed with the title Prefatory Action by Vladimir Ashkenazy in Berlin with Alexei Lubimov at the piano. Nemtin eventually completed a second portion ("Mankind") and a third ("Transfiguration"), and Ashkenazy recorded his entire two-and-a-half-hour completion with the Deutsches Symphonie-Orchester Berlin for Decca. Several late pieces published during Scriabin's lifetime are believed to have been intended for Mysterium, such as the Two Dances, Op. 73.

=== Death ===
Scriabin gave his last concert on 2 April 1915 in Petrograd (now Saint Petersburg), performing a large programme of his own works. Scriabin received rave reviews from music critics, who called his playing "most inspiring and affecting", and wrote, "his eyes flashed fire and his face radiated happiness". Scriabin himself wrote that during his performance of his Sonata No. 3, Op. 23, "I completely forgot I was playing in a hall with people around me. This happens very rarely to me on the platform." Scriabin elaborated that he normally "had to watch himself very carefully, look at himself as if from afar, to keep himself in control."

Scriabin returned triumphantly to his Moscow apartment on 4 April. He then noticed a resurgence of a little pimple on his right upper lip. Scriabin had mentioned the pimple as early as 1914 while in London. His temperature rose, and he took to bed and canceled his 11 April Moscow concert. The pimple became a pustule, then a furuncle and a carbuncle. Scriabin's doctor said it looked like "purple fire". On 10 April, Scriabin's temperature was 41 °C (106 °F), and Scriabin was now bedridden. Incisions were made two days later, but the sore had already begun to poison his blood, and Scriabin became delirious. Bowers writes: "Intractably and inexplicably, a simple spot had grown into a terminal ailment." On 14 April, aged 43 and at the height of his career, Scriabin died in his Moscow apartment of sepsis.

Le Poême de l'Extase—Traduction française de Joseph Belleau—Imprimé par Alexandre Scriabine—Don fait par la veuve du pianiste canadien et proche ami de Scriabine Alfred LaLiberté au grand pianiste canadien Marc-André Hamelin

== Music ==
The beginning of Scriabin's Étude, Op. 8, No. 12

"Étude Op. 8 No. 12"
Awadagin Pratt performs Alexander Scriabin's Étude, Op. 8, No. 12 at the White House Classical Music Student Workshop Concert. (2009-11-04)

Étude Op. 8 No. 12
Étude, Op. 8, No. 12. played by Domenico Stigliani

Rather than seeking musical versatility, Scriabin was happy to write almost exclusively for solo piano and for orchestra. His earliest piano pieces resemble Chopin's and include music in many genres that Chopin employed, such as the étude, the prelude, the nocturne, and the mazurka. Scriabin's music rapidly evolved over the course of his life. The mid- and late-period pieces use very unusual harmonies and textures.

The development of Scriabin's style can be traced in his ten piano sonatas: the earliest are composed in a fairly conventional late-Romantic manner and reveal the influence of Chopin and sometimes Liszt, but the later ones are very different, the last five lacking a key signature. Many passages in them can be said to be tonally vague, though from 1903 through 1908, "tonal unity was almost imperceptibly replaced by harmonic unity."

=== First period (1880s–1903) ===
Scriabin's first period is usually considered to last from his earliest pieces to his Symphony No. 2, Op. 29. The works from this period adhere to the romantic tradition, employing common-practice harmonic language. But Scriabin's voice is present from the very beginning, in this case by his fondness for the dominant function and added tone chords.

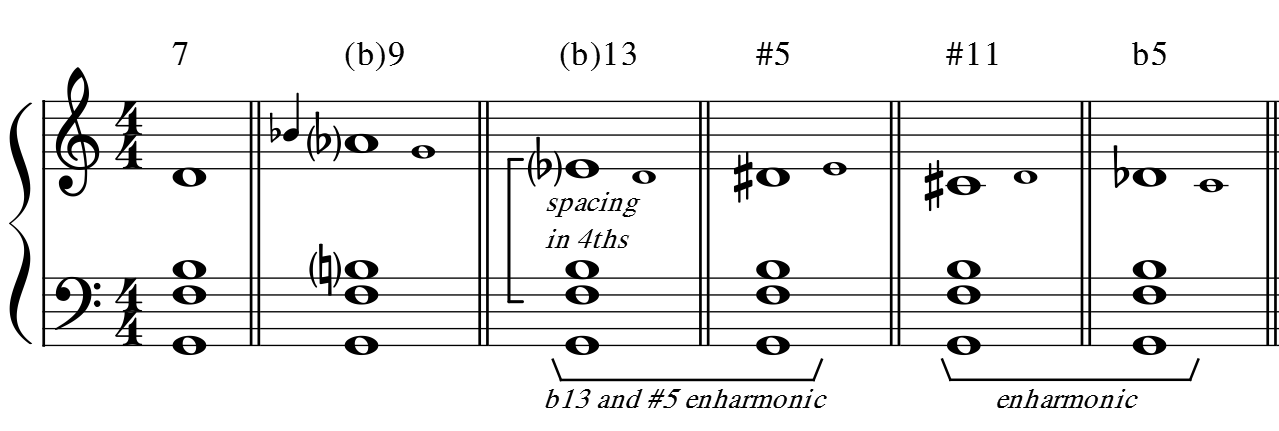
Common spellings of the dominant chord and its extensions during the common practice period. From left to right: dominant seventh, dominant ninth, dominant thirteenth, dominant seventh with raised fifth, dominant seventh with a rising chromatic appoggiatura on the fifth, and dominant seventh flattened fifth.

Scriabin's early harmonic language was especially fond of the 13th dominant chord, usually with the seventh, third, and 13th spelled in fourths. This voicing can also be seen in several of Chopin's works. According to Peter Sabbagh, this voicing was the main generating source of the later mystic chord. More importantly, Scriabin was fond of simultaneously combining two or more different dominant-seventh enhancements, such as 9ths, altered 5ths, and raised 11ths. But despite these tendencies, slightly more dissonant than usual for the time, all these dominant chords were treated according to the traditional rules: the added tones resolved to the corresponding adjacent notes, and the whole chord was treated as a dominant, fitting inside tonality and diatonic, functional harmony.

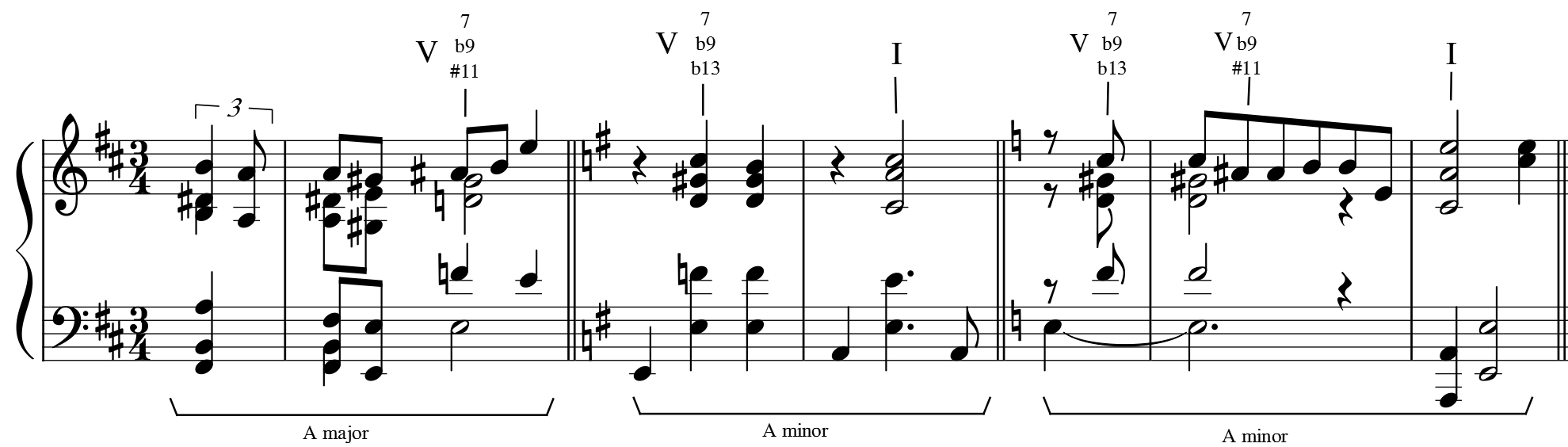
Examples of enhanced dominant chords in Scriabin's early work. Extracted from the Mazurkas Op. 3 (1888–1890): No. 1, mm. 19–20, 68; No. 4, mm. 65–67.

=== Second period (1903–07) ===
This period begins with Scriabin's Sonata No. 4, Op. 30, and ends around his Sonata No. 5, Op. 53 and the Poem of Ecstasy, Op. 54. During this period, Scriabin's music becomes more chromatic and dissonant, yet still mostly adheres to functional tonality. As dominant chords are more and more extended, they gradually lose their tensive function. Scriabin wanted his music to have a radiant, shining feeling, and attempted this by raising the number of chord tones. During this time, complex forms like the mystic chord are hinted at, but still show their roots in Chopinesque harmony.

At first, the added dissonances resolve conventionally according to voice leading, but the focus slowly shifts to a system in which chord coloring is most important. Later on, fewer dissonances in the dominant chords are resolved. According to Sabbagh, "the dissonances are frozen, solidified in a color-like effect in the chord"; the added notes become part of it.

=== Third period (1907–15) ===
I decided that the more higher tones there are in harmony, it would turn out to be more radiant, sharper and more brilliant. But it was necessary to organize the notes giving them a logical arrangement. Therefore, I took the usual thirteenth-chord, which is arranged in thirds. But it is not that important to accumulate high tones. To make it shining, conveying the idea of light, a greater number of tones had to be raised in the chord. And, therefore, I raise the tones: At first I take the shining major third, then I also raise the fifth, and the eleventh—thus forming my chord—which is raised completely and, therefore, really shining.

According to Samson, the sonata form of Scriabin's Fifth Piano Sonata has some meaning for the work's tonal structure, but formal tensions in his late piano sonatas are created by the absence of harmonic contrast and "between the cumulative momentum of the music, usually achieved by textural rather than harmonic means, and the formal constraints of the tripartite mould". Samson also writes that the Poem of Ecstasy and Vers la flamme "find a much happier co-operation of 'form' and 'content'" and that later sonatas, such as the Ninth ("Black Mass"), employ a more flexible sonata form.

According to Claude Herndon, in Scriabin's late music "tonality has been attenuated to the point of virtual extinction, although dominant sevenths, which are among the strongest indicators of tonality, preponderate. The progression of their roots in minor thirds or diminished fifths [...] dissipate the suggested tonality."

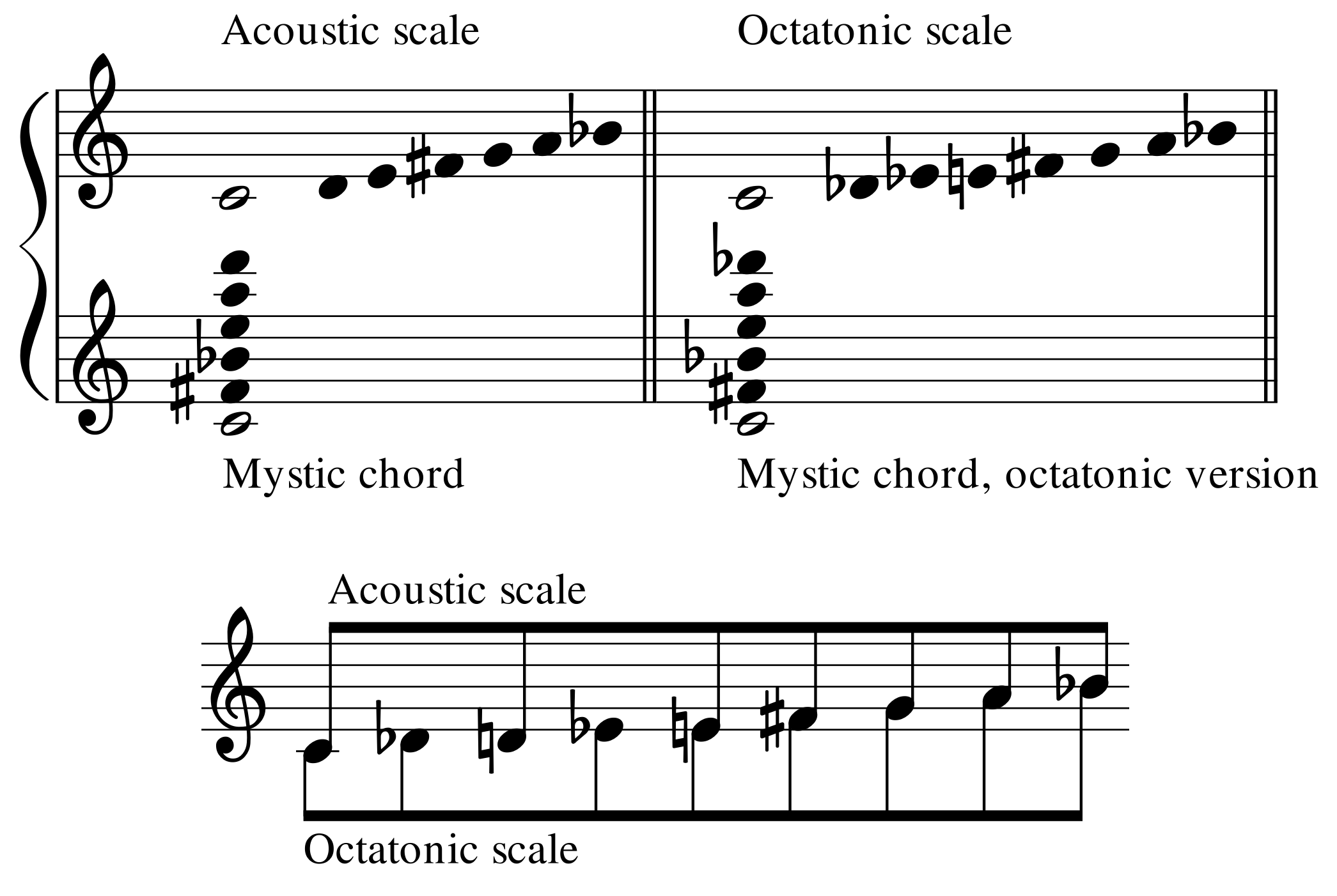
The acoustic and octatonic scales, and their combination

[The Mystic chord] is not a dominant chord, but a basic chord, a consonance. It is true—it sounds soft, like a consonance.

In former times the chords were arranged by thirds or, which is the same, by sixths. But I decided to construct them by fourths or, which is the same, by fifths.

Varvara Dernova writes, "The tonic continued to exist, and, if necessary, the composer could employ it . . . but in the great majority of cases, he preferred the concept of a tonic in distant perspective, so to speak, rather than the actually sounding tonic . . . The relationship of the tonic and dominant functions in Scriabin's work is changed radically; for the dominant actually appears and has a varied structure, while the tonic exists only as if in the imagination of the composer, the performer, and the listener."

Most of the music of this period is built on the acoustic and octatonic scales, as well as the nine-note scale resulting from their combination.

== Philosophy ==
Scriabin was interested in the philosophies and aesthetics of German authors such as Schopenhauer, Wagner, and Nietzsche, all of whom greatly influenced his musical and philosophical thought. He also showed interest in theosophy and the writings of Helena Blavatsky, making contact with theosophists such as Jean Delville. Though Scriabin has commonly been associated with theosophy, "The extent to which Scriabin seriously studied Theosophy ... is debatable, but nevertheless these associations earned him significant press coverage." Even Scriabin's brother-in-law, Boris de Schlözer, said that despite Scriabin's general interest in theosophy, he never took it seriously and was even disappointed by certain aspects of it.

Scriabin used poetry to express his philosophical notions, and he communicated much of his philosophical thought through his music, the most prominent examples being The Poem of Ecstasy and Vers la flamme.

=== Mysticism ===
The main sources of Scriabin's philosophy can be found in his notebooks, published posthumously. These writings are infamous for containing the declaration, "I am God." This phrase, often wrongly attributed to a megalomaniac personality by those unfamiliar with mysticism, is in fact a declaration of extreme humility in both Eastern and Western mysticism. In these traditions, the individual ego is so fully eradicated that only God remains. Different traditions have used different terms (e.g., fana, samadhi) to refer to essentially the same state of consciousness. Although scholars contest Scriabin's status as a theosophist, there is no denying that he was a mystic, especially influenced by a range of Russian mystics and spiritual thinkers, such as Solovyov and Berdyayev, both of whom Scriabin knew. The notion of All-Unity, the bedrock of Russian mysticism, is another contributing factor to Scriabin's declaration "I am God": if everything is interconnected and everything is God, then I, too, am God, as much as anything else.

=== Russian cosmism ===
Recent scholarship has positioned Scriabin within the tradition of early Russian cosmism. Originating from Nikolai Fyodorov's and Solovyov's ideas, Russian cosmism sought to unite humanity in a cosmic evolution, integrating spirituality and technology. Such cosmist ideas were hugely popular in Russia, and as a child of his age, Scriabin "demonstrates a creative adaptation of ideas typical of late imperial Russia" and emphasizes "concepts that corresponded to his intellectual contemporaries' preoccupation with unity and eschatological visions of life transformation." Scriabin was deeply influenced by figures like Solovyov, Berdyaev, and Bulgakov, and their spiritual ideas. Russian cosmism is an action-oriented tradition that aims to unite humanity through various means, from technology to spirituality, in a cosmic mission of active evolution and transformation. Scriabin's unique contribution to Russian cosmism was "the centrality of music's role in his philosophy", believing in music's transformative power to achieve cosmist goals. This contrasts with other cosmists, who focused more on religious, scientific, or technological means. Scriabin's philosophy integrates music and spirituality, seeing them as interconnected pathways to mystical union.

Scriabin's works reflect key cosmist themes: the importance of art, cosmos, monism, destination, and a common task for humanity. His music, embodying flight and space exploration themes, aligns with cosmist beliefs in humanity's cosmic destiny. His philosophical ideas, particularly his declarations of being God and ideas about unity and multiplicity, should be understood within the mystical context of early Russian cosmism, emphasizing unity between man, God, and nature.

=== Mysterium ===
Apart from Scriabin's finished works (e.g., The Poem of Ecstasy, Prometheus: The Poem of Fire, Vers la flamme) that encapsulate his philosophical ideas, perhaps his unfinished work Mysterium represents the culmination of his mystico-philosophical worldview. Scriabin "came to believe that he had a mission to regenerate mankind through art. This goal was to be achieved by means of a work which he referred to as the Mystery, which was to last seven days, would involve all means of expression and all of humanity, and would transform the world." Ideas of unity, transcendence, the synthesis of arts, and transformation pervade Mysterium.

== Influence of colour ==
Keys arranged in a circle of fifths in order to show the relationship with the visible spectrum in Scriabin's variant of synesthesia

Though Scriabin's late works are often considered to be influenced by synesthesia, an involuntary condition wherein one experiences sensation in one sense in response to stimulus in another, it is doubted that Scriabin actually experienced this. His colour system accords with the circle of fifths.

Scriabin did not, for his theory, recognize a difference between major and a minor tonality with the same tonic, such as C minor and C major. Indeed, influenced by theosophy, he developed his system of synesthesia toward what would have been a pioneering multimedia performance: his unrealized magnum opus Mysterium was to be a weeklong performance including music, scent, dance, and light in the foothills of the Himalayas that was somehow to bring about the world's dissolution in bliss.

In his autobiographical Recollections, Rachmaninoff recorded a conversation he had had with Scriabin and Rimsky-Korsakov about Scriabin's association of colour and music. Rachmaninoff was surprised to find that Rimsky-Korsakov agreed with Scriabin about associations of musical keys with colors; himself skeptical, Rachmaninoff made the obvious objection that the two composers did not always agree on the colours involved. Both maintained that D major is golden-brown, but Scriabin linked E-flat major with red-purple, while Rimsky-Korsakov favored blue. Rimsky-Korsakov protested that a passage in Rachmaninoff's opera The Miserly Knight accorded with their claim: the scene in which the Old Baron opens treasure chests to reveal gold and jewels glittering in torchlight is in D major. Scriabin told Rachmaninoff, "your intuition has unconsciously followed the laws whose very existence you have tried to deny."

Scriabin wrote only a small number of orchestral works, but they are among his most famous, and some are performed frequently. They include a piano concerto (1896), and five symphonic works: three numbered symphonies, The Poem of Ecstasy (1908), and Prometheus: The Poem of Fire (1910), which includes a part for a machine known as a "clavier à lumières", also known as a Luce (Italian for "light"), a colour organ designed specifically for the performance of Scriabin's tone poem. It was played like a piano, but projected coloured light on a screen in the concert hall rather than sound. Most performances of the piece (including the premiere) have omitted this light element, although a performance in New York City in 1915 projected colours onto a screen. It has been erroneously claimed that this performance used the colour-organ invented by English painter A. Wallace Rimington; in fact, it was a novel construction supervised personally and built in New York specifically for the performance by Preston S. Miller, the president of the Illuminating Engineering Society.

On 22 November 1969, the work was fully realized, making use of the composer's color score as well as newly developed laser technology on loan from Yale's Physics Department, by John Mauceri and the Yale Symphony Orchestra and designed by Richard N. Gould, who projected the colors into the auditorium reflected by Mylar vests worn by the audience. The Yale Symphony repeated the presentation in 1971 and brought the work to Paris that year for what was perhaps its Paris premiere at the Théâtre des Champs-Élysées. The piece was reprised at Yale again in 2010 (as conceived by Anna M. Gawboy on YouTube, who, with Justin Townsend, wrote Scriabin and the Possible).

Scriabin's original colour keyboard, with its associated turntable of coloured lamps, is preserved in his apartment near the Arbat in Moscow, which is now a museum dedicated to his life and works.

== Recordings and performers ==
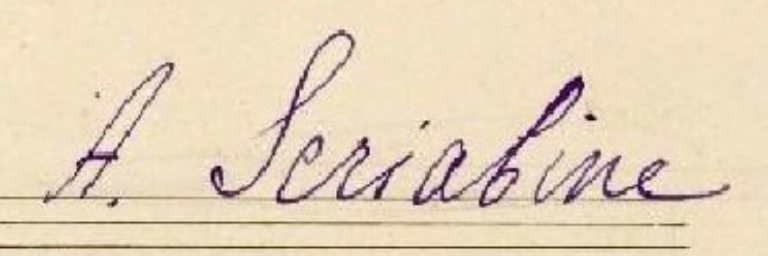
Autograph signature, from the manuscript of Two Poems, Op. 63. The composer uses the French spelling "Scriabine".

Scriabin himself made recordings of 19 of his own works, using 20 piano rolls, six for the Welte-Mignon, and 14 for Ludwig Hupfeld of Leipzig. The Welte rolls were recorded in February 1910 in Moscow, and have been replayed and published on CD. Those recorded for Hupfeld include the Sonatas Nos. 2 and 3 (Opp. 19 and 23). While this indirect evidence of Scriabin's pianism prompted a mixed critical reception, close analysis of the recordings within the context of the limitations of the particular piano roll technology can shed light on the free style he favoured for his own works, characterized by extemporary variations in tempo, rhythm, articulation, dynamics, and sometimes even the notes.

Pianists who have performed Scriabin to particular critical acclaim include Vladimir Sofronitsky, Vladimir Horowitz and Sviatoslav Richter. Sofronitsky never met Scriabin, as his parents forbade him from attending a concert due to illness. Sofronitsky said he never forgave them, but he married Scriabin's daughter Elena. According to Horowitz, when he played for Scriabin as an 11-year-old, Scriabin responded enthusiastically and encouraged him to pursue a full musical and artistic education. When Rachmaninoff performed Scriabin's music, Scriabin criticized his pianism and his admirers as earthbound.

Surveys of the solo piano works have been recorded by Gordon Fergus-Thompson, Pervez Mody, Maria Lettberg, Joseph Villa, Michael Ponti, Dmitri Alexeev, and Elina Akselrud. The complete published sonatas have also been recorded by Ashkenazy, Robert Taub, Håkon Austbø, Boris Berman, Bernd Glemser, Marc-André Hamelin, Yakov Kasman, Ruth Laredo, John Ogdon, Garrick Ohlsson, Roberto Szidon, Anatol Ugorski, Anna Malikova, Mariangela Vacatello, Mikhail Voskresensky, and Igor Zhukov, among others.

In 2015, German-Australian pianist Stefan Ammer, as a part of The Scriabin Project Concert Series, joined his pupils Mekhla Kumar, Konstantin Shamray, and Ashley Hribar to honour Scriabin at various venues in Australia.

== Reception and influence ==
Prélude, Op. 11 No. 1
(728 kB)

Prélude, Op. 11 No. 2
(1492 kB)

Mazurka, Op. 40 No. 2
(677 kB)

Prelude, Op. 67 No. 1
Performed by Jennifer Castellano

Scriabin's funeral, on 16 April 1915, was attended by so many people that tickets had to be issued. Rachmaninoff, a pallbearer, subsequently embarked on a grand tour of Russia, performing only Scriabin's music for the family's benefit. It was the first time Rachmaninoff had publicly performed piano music other than his own. Prokofiev admired Scriabin, and his Visions fugitives bears great likeness to Scriabin's tone and style. Another admirer was the English composer Kaikhosru Sorabji, who promoted Scriabin even during the years when his popularity had decreased greatly. Aaron Copland praised Scriabin's thematic material as "truly individual, truly inspired", but criticized Scriabin for putting "this really new body of feeling into the strait-jacket of the old classical sonata-form, recapitulation and all", calling this "one of the most extraordinary mistakes in all music."

The work of Nikolai Roslavets, unlike Prokofiev's and Stravinsky's, is often seen as a direct extension of Scriabin's. But unlike Scriabin's, Roslavets's music was not explained with mysticism and was eventually given theoretical explication by the composer. Roslavets was not alone in his innovative extension of Scriabin's musical language, as quite a few Soviet composers and pianists, such as Feinberg, Sergei Protopopov, Nikolai Myaskovsky, and Alexander Mosolov followed this legacy until Stalinist politics quelled it in favor of Socialist Realism.

Scriabin's music was greatly disparaged in the West during the 1930s. In the UK Sir Adrian Boult refused to play the Scriabin selections chosen by the BBC programmer Edward Clark, calling it "evil music", and even banned Scriabin's music from broadcasts in the 1930s. In 1935, Gerald Abraham called Scriabin a "sad pathological case, erotic and egotistic to the point of mania". At the same time, the pianist Edward Mitchell, who compiled a catalogue of Scriabin's piano music in 1927, was championing his music in recitals and regarded him as "the greatest composer since Beethoven".

Scriabin's music has since undergone a total rehabilitation and can be heard in major concert halls worldwide. In 2009, Roger Scruton called Scriabin "one of the greatest of modern composers".

In 2020, a bust of Scriabin was placed in the Small Hall of the Moscow Conservatory.

== Relatives and descendants ==
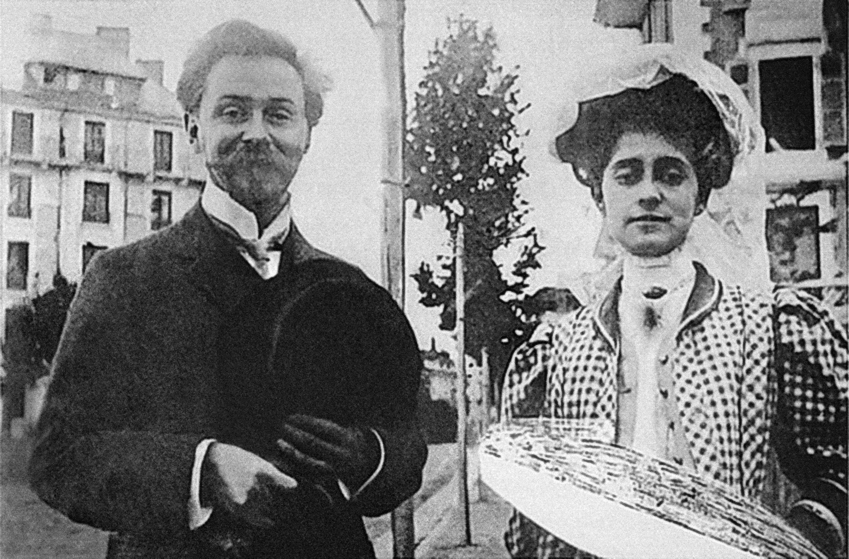
Scriabin with Tatiana, 1909

Scriabin was the uncle of Metropolitan Anthony Bloom of Sourozh, a renowned bishop in the Russian Orthodox Church who directed the Russian Orthodox diocese in Great Britain between 1957 and 2003. Scriabin was not a relative of Soviet Minister of Foreign Affairs Vyacheslav Molotov, whose birth name was Vyacheslav Skryabin. In his memoirs published by Felix Chuyev under the Russian title "Молотов, Полудержавный властелин", Molotov explains that his brother Nikolay Skryabin, who was also a composer, had adopted the name Nikolay Nolinsky in order not to be confused with Alexander Scriabin.

Scriabin had seven children in total: from his first marriage Rimma (Rima), Elena, Maria (1901–1989), and Lev, and from his second Ariadna (1905–1944), Julian, and Marina. Rimma died of intestinal issues in 1905 at age seven. Elena became an author, professor emeritus of Russian at the University of Iowa, and in 1920, the wife of pianist and Scriabin interpreter Vladimir Sofronitsky. Maria became an actress at the Second Moscow Art Theatre and the wife of director Vladimir Tatarinov. Lev also died at age seven, in 1910. At this point, relations with Scriabin's first wife had significantly deteriorated, and Scriabin did not meet her at the funeral.

Ariadna became a hero of the French Resistance, and was posthumously awarded the Croix de Guerre and the Médaille de la Résistance. Her third marriage was to the poet and WWII Resistance fighter David Knut, after which she converted to Judaism and took the name Sarah. She co-founded the Zionist resistance movement Armée Juive and was responsible for communications between the command in Toulouse and the partisan forces in the Tarn district and for taking weapons to the partisans, which resulted in her death when she was ambushed by the French Militia.

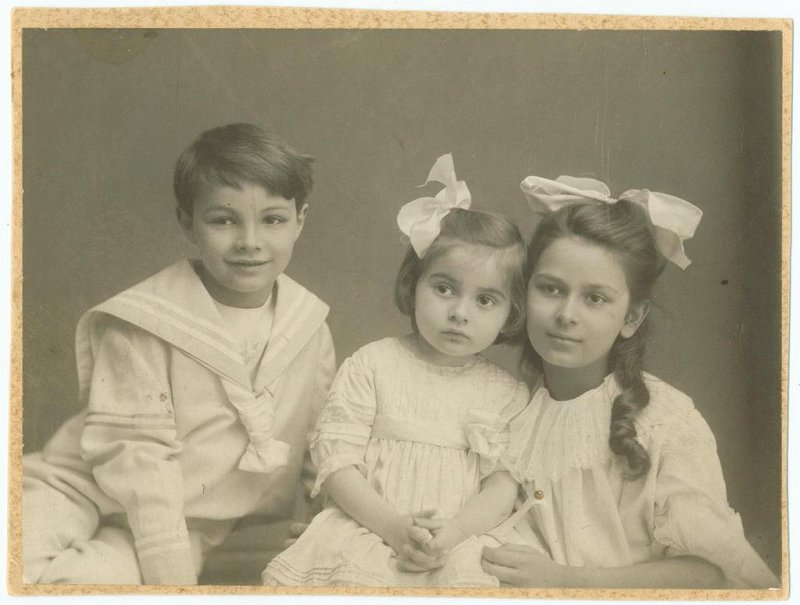
Scriabin's children from Tatiana: Julian, Marina and Ariadna, c. 1913

Ariadna's daughter (by her first marriage to French composer Daniel Lazarus), Betty (Elizabeth) Lazarus (who later adopted the surname of her stepfather, David Knut, becoming Betty Knut), was a heroine of the French Resistance, personally winning the Silver Star from George S. Patton, as well as the French Croix de Guerre. After the war she became an active member of the militant Zionist Lehi (Stern Gang), undertaking special operations for it, and she was imprisoned in 1947 for launching a terrorist letter bomb campaign against British targets and planting explosives on British ships that were trying to prevent Jewish immigrants from travelling to Mandatory Palestine. Regarded as a heroine in France, she was released prematurely but imprisoned a year later in Israel for alleged involvement in the killing of Folke Bernadotte. The charges were later dropped. After her release from prison, she settled at age 23 in Beersheba, Israel, where she had three children and founded a nightclub that became Beersheba's cultural centre. She died at age 38.

In total, three of Ariadna's children immigrated to Israel after the war, where her son Eli (born 1935) became a sailor in the Israeli Navy and a noted classical guitarist, while her son Joseph (Yossi, born 1943) served in the Israeli special forces, before becoming a poet, publishing many poems dedicated to his mother. One of her great-grandsons, via Betty Knut-Lazarus, Elisha Abas, is an Israeli concert pianist.

Julian, a child prodigy, was a composer and pianist, but died by drowning at age 11 (1919) in the Dnieper River in Ukraine.
