= Igor Zhukov =

Russian pianist and conductor (1936-2018)

Igor Zhukov И́горь Миха́йлович Жу́ков
- Born: 31 August 1936; Nizhny Novgorod
- Died: 26 January 2018 (aged 81)
- Genres: Classical music
- Occupation: Pianist
- Instrument: Piano
- Labels: Melodiya
- Website: https://www.igor-zhukov.info/

Igor Mikhaylovich Zhukov (Russian: Игорь Михайлович Жуков; 31 August 1936 – 26 January 2018) was a Russian pianist, conductor and sound engineer.

Zhukov was born in Nizhny Novgorod in 1936 but his family moved to Moscow in the following year. Four years later, they were evacuated to Vyatka (then known as Kirov) as a result of the Second World War. After the war, they returned to Moscow, where Zhukov studied at the Conservatory in 1955, studying first with Emil Gilels and then, in 1955, with Heinrich Neuhaus. He graduated in 1960, having won second prize in the Long-Thibaud Piano Competition in Paris.

Apart from a career as a pianist, Zhukov also conducted his own ensemble, the Moscow Chamber Orchestra until his retirement from conducting in 1994, and was the pianist of the long-running Zhukov Piano Trio which was founded in 1963 and continued performing until 1980. (The other members were the violinist Grigory Feighin and cellist Valentin Feighin.) The trio was noted for its "Historic Concerts" which featured repertoire spanning the 17th to the 20th centuries.

Zhukov made recordings on the Melodiya label (Angel in the US), among others (e.g. the complete Scriabin sonatas). Zhukov also had a passionate interest in recording, and said of himself "I'm the best pianist among recording engineers, and the best recording engineer among pianists."

== Sources ==
- Rueger, Christoph. The multiple talents of Igor Zhukov. Essay included with The Russian Piano School Vol 16: Igor Zhukov, Melodia CD 74321 332142, 1996
