= Mysterium (Scriabin) =

Unfinished musical work by Alexander Scriabin

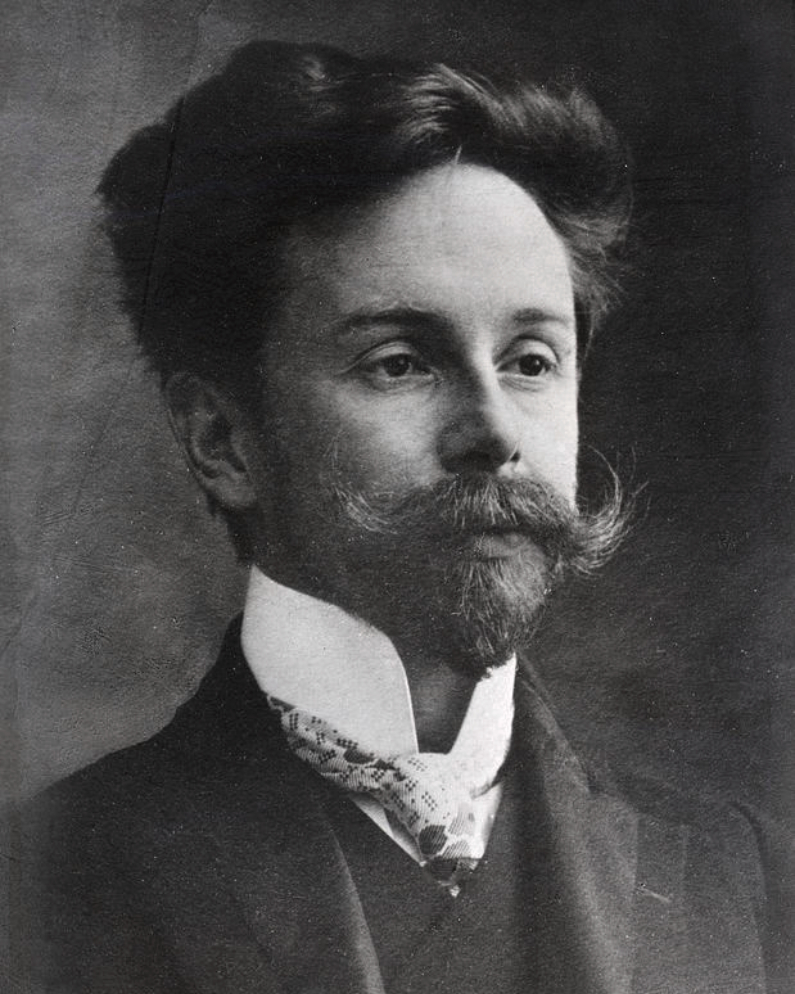
Alexander Scriabin in 1909

Mysterium is an unfinished musical work by composer Alexander Scriabin. He started working on the composition in 1903, but left it incomplete when he died in 1915. Scriabin planned that the work would be synesthetic, exploiting the senses of smell and touch as well as hearing, writing:

There will not be a single spectator. All will be participants. The work requires special people, special artists and a completely new culture. The cast of performers includes an orchestra, a large mixed choir, an instrument with visual effects, dancers, a procession, incense, and rhythmic textural articulation. The cathedral in which it will take place will not be of one single type of stone but will continually change with the atmosphere and motion of the Mysterium. This will be done with the aid of mists and lights, which will modify the architectural contours.

Scriabin intended the performance to be in the foothills of the Himalayas in India, a week-long event that would be followed by the end of the world and the transformation of the human race into "nobler beings".

At the time of his death, Scriabin had sketched 72 pages of a prelude to the Mysterium, entitled Prefatory Action. The Russian composer and musicologist Alexander Nemtin spent 26 years reforming this sketch into a three-hour-long work, "Preparation for the Final Mystery" in 3 parts: Part 1 "Universe", Part 2 "Mankind", and Part 3 "Transfiguration". Part 1 was recorded in 1973, conducted by Kiril Kondrashin, released LP 1973; in 1997 Vladimir Ashkenazy recorded all 3 parts with Deutsches Symphonie-Orchester Berlin.

== In popular culture ==
The Hungarian film The Tragedy of Man (1988–2011) uses parts from the "Universe" section of Nemtin's reconstruction in the introduction and creation of the universe by God.

Scriabin's Mysterium is depicted in Issue 3 of the graphic novel trilogy Suffrajitsu: Mrs. Pankhurst's Amazons (2015).

The podcast The Black Tapes (2015–2017) uses Scriabin's Mysterium as a potential example of someone trying to access supernatural forces.

== See also ==
- Synesthesia in art
