= Vladimir Sofronitsky =

Russian and Soviet classical pianist (1901–1961)

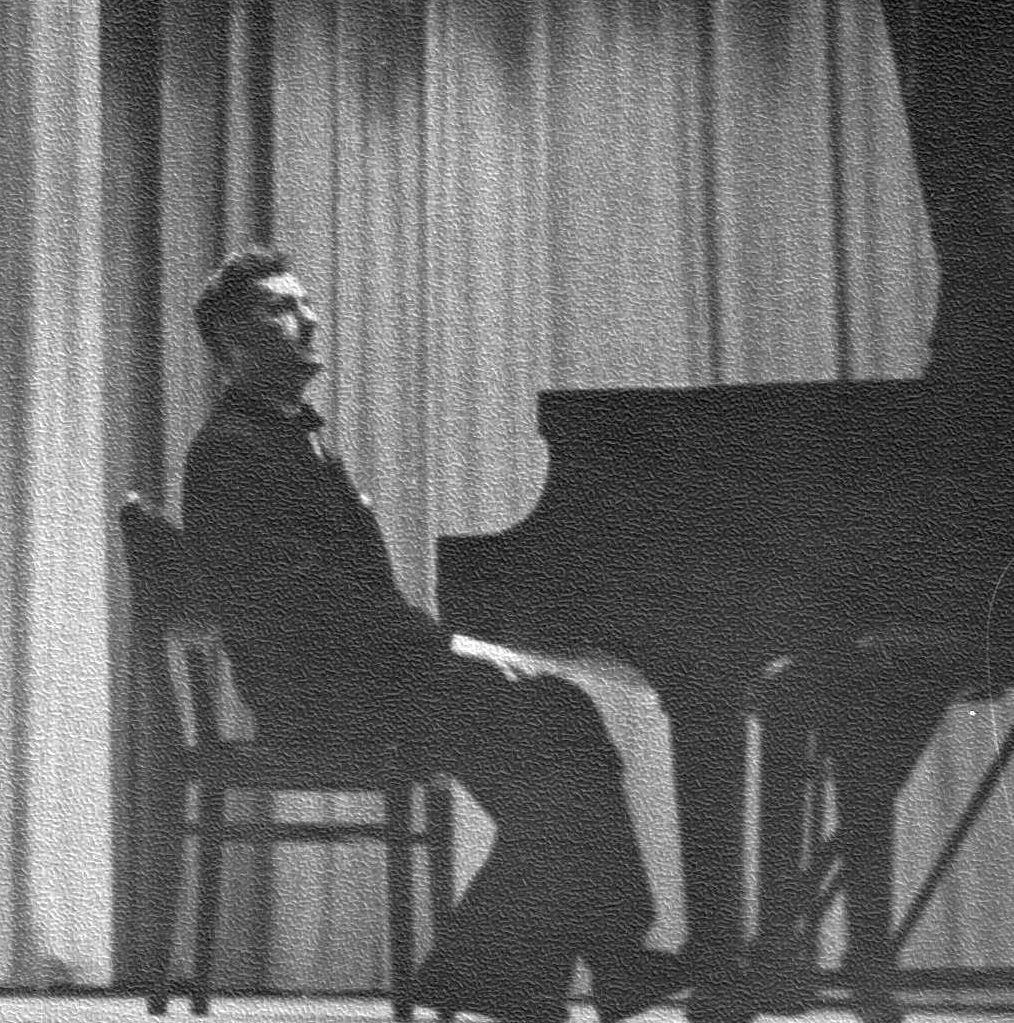
Sofronitsky at a concert

Vladimir Vladimirovich Sofronitsky (or Sofronitzky; Russian: Влади́мир Влади́мирович Софрони́цкий; 8 May [O.S. 25 April] 1901 – August 29, 1961) was a Russian and Soviet classical pianist, best known as an interpreter of Alexander Scriabin and Frédéric Chopin. His daughter is the Canadian pianist Viviana Sofronitsky.

== Biography ==
Vladimir Sofronitsky was born in St. Petersburg, Russia. His father was a physics teacher and his mother came from an artistic family. In 1903, his family moved to Warsaw, where he started piano lessons with Anna Lebedeva-Getcevich (a student of Nikolai Rubinstein), and later (at the age of nine) with Aleksander Michałowski.

From 1916 to 1921, Sofronitsky studied at the Petrograd Conservatory under Leonid Nikolayev, where Dmitri Shostakovich, Maria Yudina, and Elena Scriabina, the eldest daughter of Alexander Scriabin (who had died in 1915), were among his classmates. He met Scriabina in 1917 and married her in 1920. He had previously expressed a sympathy for Scriabin's piano music—as attested by Yudina—and he now had a greater intellectual and emotional connection to Scriabin's works through his wife and through the Scriabin in-laws. Sofronitsky was also acclaimed as an outstanding pianist by the composer Alexander Glazunov and the musicologist and critic Alexander Ossovsky.

He gave his first solo concert in 1919, and made his only foreign tour between 1928 and 1929, in France. The only other time he performed outside the Soviet Union was at the Potsdam Conference in 1945, when he was suddenly sent by Stalin to play for the allied leaders.

Sofronitsky taught at the Leningrad Conservatory from 1936 to 1942, and then at the Moscow Conservatory until his death. He was awarded a Stalin Prize of the first class in 1943 and proclaimed an Honoured Artist of the RSFSR in 1942. He gave many performances at the Scriabin Museum in Moscow, especially during the latter part of his career.

Sofronitsky made a moderate number of recordings in the last two decades of his life, although fewer than those made by Sviatoslav Richter and Emil Gilels, from the younger generation of Soviet pianists. Drawn principally to Romantic repertoire, Sofronitsky recorded a large number of Scriabin's works and also compositions by Beethoven, Schubert, Chopin, Schumann, Liszt, Lyadov, Rachmaninoff, Medtner, Prokofiev, and others.

== Repertoire ==
Having met Scriabin's daughter only after her father's death, Sofronitsky never met the composer. Nevertheless, his daughter vouched that the pianist was the most authentic interpreter of her late father's works. The other composer with whom Sofronitsky had the greatest affinity is Frédéric Chopin. He once told an interviewer: "A love for Chopin has followed me through the course of my entire life." Beyond Chopin and Scriabin, Sofronitsky had a wide repertoire spanning major composers from Johann Sebastian Bach to Nikolai Medtner and reaching as far as the works of Boris Goltz (1913–1942), with a focus on 19th-century Romantic composers and early 20th-century Russians.

== Recognition and recordings ==
Although little known in the West, Sofronitsky was held in the highest regard in his native land. Sviatoslav Richter and Emil Gilels looked up to Sofronitsky as their master, and famously, when Sofronitsky once drunkenly proclaimed that Richter was a genius, in return Richter toasted him and proclaimed him a god. Upon hearing of Sofronitsky's death, Gilels was reputed to have said that "the greatest pianist in the world has died."

Sofronitsky's recordings have been issued by labels including Arkadia, Arlecchino, Chant du Monde, Denon Classics, Multisonic, Urania, Vista Vera, and Philips. A release in BMG's "Russian Piano School" series contains a concert recording, including Schumann's Piano Sonata No. 1, Op. 11.

His issue in Philips' Great Pianists of the Twentieth Century features Chopin mazurkas and waltzes on the first CD and some of his legendary Scriabin on the second, including the 2nd (first movement), 3rd, 4th, and 9th sonatas and a performance of Vers la flamme. Denon Classics' (Japan) Vladimir Sofronitsky Edition is a series of 15 CDs, ten of which remain in print. Brilliant Classics published Sofronitsky's 9 CDs edition of recordings of Scriabin, Chopin, Rachmaninoff and others. His recordings document one of the most intense and individual pianistic personalities of the 20th century.
