= Max Windmüller =

German member of the Dutch resistance in World War II

Max Windmüller (7 February 1920 in Emden, East Frisia – 21 April 1945 in Cham, Oberpfalz) was a German member of the Dutch resistance. He was forced to flee from the National Socialists to the Netherlands with his parents because of their Jewish faith. He joined the Westerweel Group there and saved the lives of many Jewish children and young people. The members of the Westerweel group organized identification papers, hiding places and escape opportunities, especially for German-Jewish children and young people who had fled from Germany. In this group, Jews and members of other faiths worked together to save the Jews from persecution. Such cooperation was not a matter of course in the Netherlands. Windmüller personally saved around 100 young Jews, and the entire Westerweel group saved 393 Jews. In July 1944, the Gestapo stormed a secret meeting of the Resistance group in Paris in which Windmüller and other members of the Jewish resistance were arrested. They were then taken to Gestapo headquarters where they were interrogated and tortured. When the liberation of the camp by Allied troops was imminent, Windmüller was deported from occupied France with the last transport. On 21 April 1945, he was shot by a Schutzstaffel member.

== Life ==
=== Childhood ===
Max Windmüller was born the son of a butcher and cattle dealer Moritz Windmüller and Jette Windmüller (née Seligmann) and had four siblings. He was named Max after his father's brother who had died in World War I. From 1926 to 1933 he attended the Jewish Elementary School in Emden. In his last school year he became a member of the Socialist Youth League of Germany.

=== Escape to the Netherlands ===
After the German authorities had withdrawn their father's business license, the family fled to the Netherlands in 1933. The family escaped via Delfzijl to Beilen to a sister of the mother. From there they went on to Groningen. Here, Windmüller and his brother Isaak joined a group that organized the emigration of young people to Palestine. Isaak became the leader of this group while Windmüller completed his agricultural training on a farm near Assen in preparation for emigration to Palestine. Shortly before the outbreak of the War in 1939, his brother Isaak fled to Palestine on the ship "Dora", which brought immigrants there illegally.

Max, who was already on board, was persuaded by Rue Cohen, the organizer of the training for Palestine pioneers, to go ashore again; he was to continue to help build the Hachsharah , which brought young Jews from Germany and Austria to Palestine on Dutch farms.

In 1940 the Netherlands were invaded and occupied by the German Empire. Now the Jews living there were also subject to the German regime. There was a traumatic event for the Jews in the Netherlands in 1941 when 900 Jews - all young people - were captured by the German occupiers and deported to the Mauthausen concentration camp . By the end of September, almost all of them had been murdered in Mauthausen. The German occupation authorities threatened anyone who did not follow their orders with deportation to Mauthausen.

In view of this danger, many of the young people wishing to emigrate were preparing for a life in the underground. They were supported by Dutch helpers. Windmüller met his later fiancée Metta Lande, a Jewish woman who had fled Vienna. In July 1942, the National Socialists began mass deportations from the Netherlands, tens of thousands of Jews were brought to the transit camp Westerbork, from where weekly transports to the extermination camps Auschwitz and Sobibor started. Among the deportees were Windmüller's mother and his brother Salomon, along with his wife and child, who was only a few weeks old.

=== Westerweel group ===
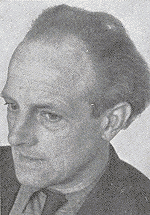
Joop Westerweel

During this time, Windmüller and his younger brother Emil hid in various places in the Netherlands, including in attics in Amsterdam and Haarlem for 13 months. He joined the Westerweel Group, whose leader was the convinced pacifist Joop Westerweel. This group was dedicated to organizing hiding places and identity documents for Jewish refugees in the Netherlands. On 14 August 1942, the Amsterdam Jewish Council learned of the planned deportation of all children and adolescents and their educators. The group around Windmüller was informed about this in good time by Erika Blüth. On 16 August 1942, more than thirty Jewish youths disappeared from a home in Deventer Vereniging in Loosdrecht - three days after the leaders of the Palestine pioneers learned that the "children" had been picked up and taken to the so-called Westerbork Jewish transit camp. It was possible to find “submerged addresses” for them at short notice. Windmüller, however, was caught by the Gestapo for the first time and brought to the Westerbork Concentration Camp, but was able to flee in a laundry car after only two days. He went into hiding with Frans and Henny Gerritsen in Haarlem, where his brother Emil was sometimes hidden with up to ten "Onderduikers" (people in hiding). Here was one of the centers of the Dutch underground. Frans was a graphic artist and, in collaboration with local resistance officials, was able to forge the urgently needed passports, grocery cards, marching orders and other documents. Windmüller received new papers, now officially called Cornelius Andringa and called himself "Cor." In 1943, the resistance group around Joop Westerweel, Menachem Pinkhof, Joachim Simon and Max Windmüller contacted other Jewish groups via Belgium and France, to the Jewish Agency and to the Joint (American Joint Distribution Committee). Windmüller and his group organized escape routes to the south of France and across the Pyrenees to Spain.

=== Windmüller in France ===
At the end of 1943, Max Windmüller became the liaison of the Jews in occupied France under his code name Cor . A whole group of young people worked with him, fighting for their own survival and that of their fellow Jews. In April 1944, Cor was on a rescue trip to Holland when the Gestapo arrested a first group of fellow combatants in his Paris apartment.

Cor and his comrades tried everything to find the whereabouts of the arrested and free them. His comrade Paula Kaufmann smuggled himself into the Gestapo headquarters in Chinatown as a secretary. The two pretended to be lovers when Max picked them up from work. Paula always came out of the head office with her boss and bypassed the controls. She brought out secret papers and blank papers in her pocket. Cor now had an identity card as a man of the Security Service for the occupied territories in France and, due to his freedom of movement, was able to set up escape routes to the south of France and across the Pyrenees to Spain. All of them - Jewish refugees, mostly from Austria and Germany, including Max's fiancée Metta Lande - pretended to be Dutch to the occupation authorities. Tens of thousands of civilian workers - Belgians, Danes, Dutch - were used to build the Atlantic Wall. The Jewish refugees “swam” in these masses of people who were traveling from one job to another. Cors' job included picking up the individual refugees at the so-called green border - at illegal border crossings - and smuggling them through Belgium to the south of France.

Cor tirelessly traveled between the Netherlands, Belgium, northern France (Paris, Brittany) and southern France (Toulouse, Lyon). In this way, he managed to smuggle around a hundred young people into freedom. Cor also saved his brother Emil. Of the 716 young Jews living in the Netherlands “on Hachsharah”, 393 survived through the commitment of the Westerweel Group.

In contact with the "Resistance Juive" operating in Vichy-France, Cor and his group were involved in an unsuccessful attempt to free the captured Chaverim (comrades). They also wanted to connect the "Armée Juive" under construction with the British Secret Intelligence Service. They were deceived: the contact people, called "Lydia" and "Charles", worked as double agents not only for the British secret service, but also for the Gestapo.

=== Arrest ===
On 18 July 1944, the Gestapo stormed a secret meeting of the Résistance in Rue Erlanger in Paris after it was betrayed by the double agent Karl Rebhein. Windmüller and other members of the Jewish resistance were arrested. The warrant was for treason, favoritism and espionage. Fortunately, Metta escaped her arrest. The arrested were taken to Gestapo headquarters in Rue de la Pompe, interrogated and tortured, and Loebenberg died. The rest were taken to the Drancy camp via Fresnes prison. From there, a total of more than 61,000 people — Jews and resistance fighters — were deported to the death camps. From the group around Cor there were also Kurt Reilinger (Nanno), Paula Kaufmann, Alfred Fraenkel (Tzippy), Ernst Hirsch, Ernst Ascher, Gert Sperber, Paul Wolf and from the French group René Kapel, Jacques Lazarus and others.

=== Buchenwald Concentration Camp ===
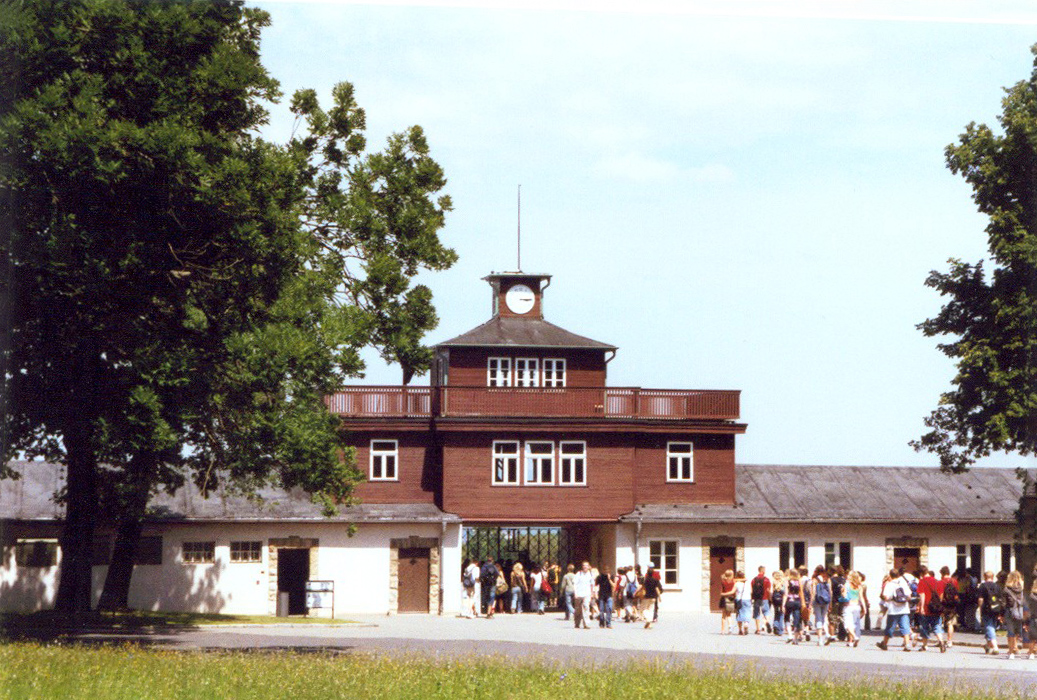
Buchenwald concentration camp

When the liberation of the camp by Allied troops was imminent, Cor and another 50 people were deported from occupied France with the last transport. Alois Brunner, who had been the head of a Gestapo special command in a suburb of Paris, attached a wagon labelled "Jews terrorists" to his own personal escape train. Probably a show trial against the alleged "Jewish world conspiracy" should be staged at a later date. Metta followed friends in a car on the track of the train to the border in Liège - to no avail. Twenty-one prisoners managed to escape on the way, but Cor was not among them. Max Windmüller was registered on 25 August 1944 in Buchenwald Concentration Camp as a new entry under prisoner number 54573 as a stateless Jew, and his profession listed as "agricultural worker". In addition to the yellow triangle for Jewish prisoners, he had to wear the red triangle of political prisoners. On 20 September 1944, Windmüller was sent to Bochum for forced labor in an armored plate factory of Eisen- und Hüttenwerk AG (today part of ThyssenKrupp AG). He was ordered to oversee his chamber with 16 fellow prisoners and, after a few days, was asked to be more strict. When he refused, he was assigned to the hardest jobs. The food ration consisted of ¾ liters of soup and 200 grams of bread a day. From 7 March 1945, Windmüller was again listed in the Buchenwald camp.

=== Death march from Buchenwald concentration camp ===
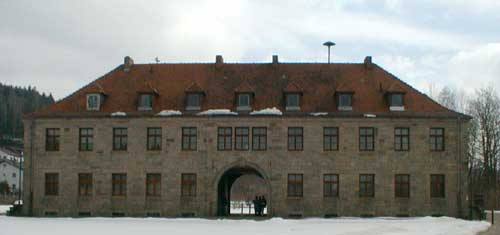
At the entrance to the Flossenbürg Concentration Camp Memorial

On 3 April 1945, the last appeal was made in Buchenwald before the SS camp commandant Hermann Pister. The next day he gave the order to "evacuate" all Jewish prisoners. From 7 to 10 April 1945 - and thus shortly before the arrival of the American army - some of the Jewish prisoners were rounded up in the halls of the Deutsche Austausungswerke. Over 10,000 prisoners were forced onto several transports with the destination of Flossenbürg concentration camp (near Weiden on the Czech border). The first column of prisoners were supposed to reach their destination on foot, but were instead destined to die during the death march. Within a few kilometers to Weimar, 40 prisoners were murdered and returned to the camp crematorium on the same day. On the short route between Orlamünde and the Bavarian border, 238 prisoners were either killed or shot by the SS.

Max Windmuller and Paul Wolf were transported to Flossenbürg via open freight cars, but due to the advancement of the Americans, the prisoners were forced to walk to the Dachau concentration camp. All along the way, countless prisoners were left behind due to physical weakness and ill-treatment, and were either slain or shot by the SS. Only about 300 prisoners arrived in Dachau. On 21 April 1945, Max Windmüller was shot by a member of the SS after he had left the column to relax after being overcome by pneumonia and fever. Metta Lande, Max Windmüller's fiancé, survived the Holocaust and later moved to Israel.

== Literature ==
- Berrie J. Asscher: Van Mokum naar Jerusalem (1924–1944). Beerscheva 1996.
- Yigael Benjamin: They were our friends. A memorial for the members of the Hachsharot und Helalutz underground in Holland, murdered in the holocaust. Tel Aviv 1990.
- Jean-Francois Chaigneau: Le dernier Wagon. Paris 1981. ISBN 2-260-00273-0
- Marianne Claudi, Reinhard Claudi (Hrsg.): Die wir verloren haben. Lebensgeschichten Emder Juden. Aurich 1991. ISBN 3-925365-31-1
- René S. Kapel: Un rabbin dans la tourmente (1940–1944). Centre de documentation juive contemporaine, Paris 1986.
- Anny Latour: The Jewish Resistance in France 1940–1944. Holocaust Library, New York 1981. ISBN 0-89604-026-7
- Lucien Lazare: La résistance Juive en France. Un combat pour la survie. Paris 2001. ISBN 2-902969-73-2
- Jacques Lazarus: Les Juifs au combat. Témoignage sur l’activité d’un mouvement de résistance. Centre de documentation juive contemporaine CDJC, Paris 1947.
- Klaus Meyer-Dettum: Max Windmüller (1920–1945). Eine Recherche. Arbeitskreis Juden in Emden, Emden 1997, online, bearbeitet
