= Lucien Lublin =

Lucien Lublin (1909, Brest-Litovsk – 1995) was a French electrical engineer. A Labor Zionist who became a leader of the French Jewish Resistance during World War II with Abraham Polonski and David Knout. Lublin had been a member of the Zionist Labor Movement before the war.

After the World War II, Lublin created the Society for Protecting Jewish Children, a charity which helped Jewish children who had survived the Holocaust and took them to the State of Israel.
