= Jewish Cemeteries in Emden =

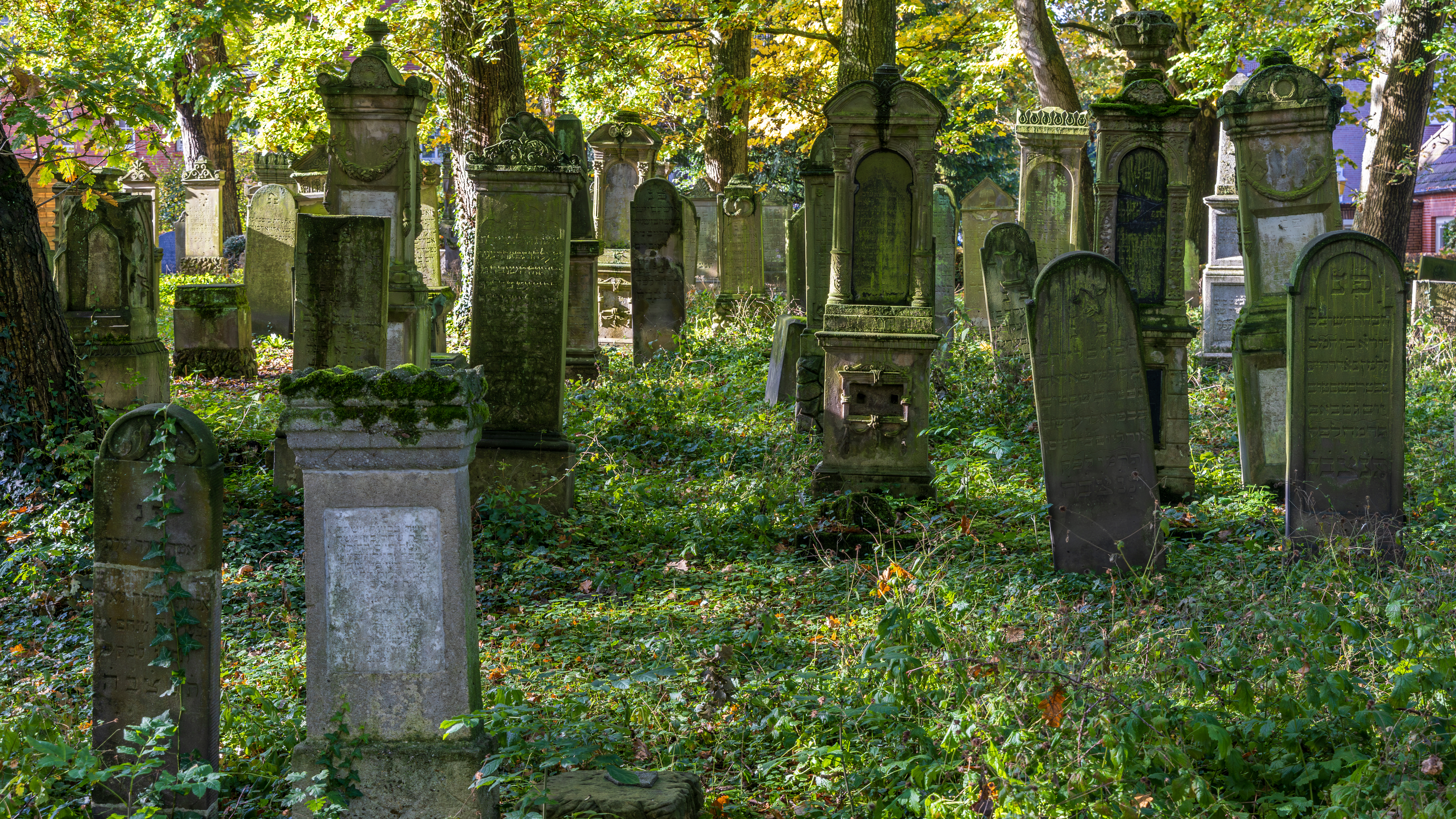
The Jewish cemetery on Bollwerkstraße in Emden

There were at least two Jewish cemeteries in Emden. The oldest was established by the local community outside the city in the 16th century in the present-day district of Tholenswehr at Treckfahrtstief; the second was established in 1703 on grounds at what is now Bollwerkstraße. A total of 798 gravestones are preserved there. It is thus the largest Jewish cemetery in East Frisia.

== History ==
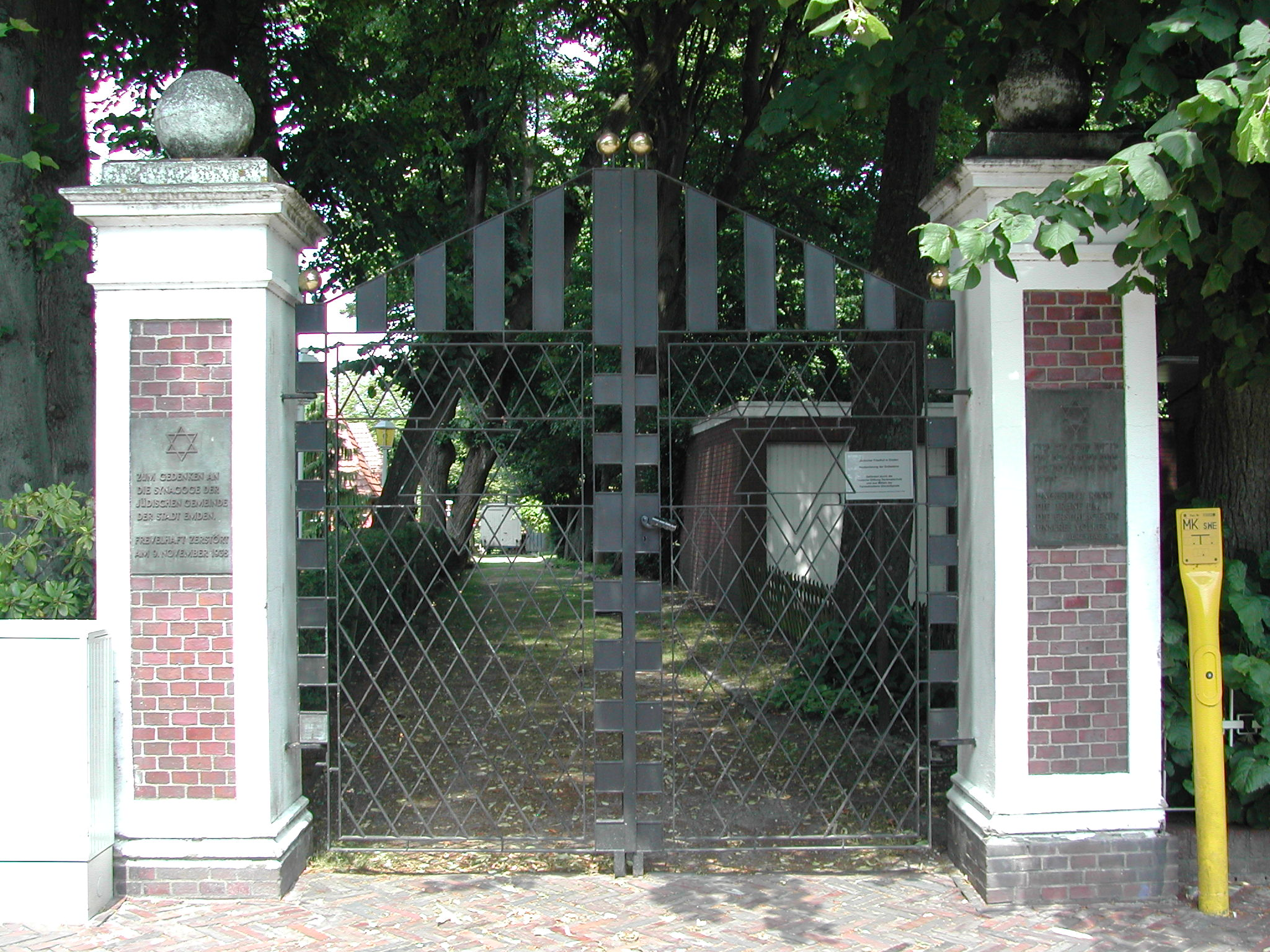
Entrance gate to the Jewish cemetery in Tholenswehr

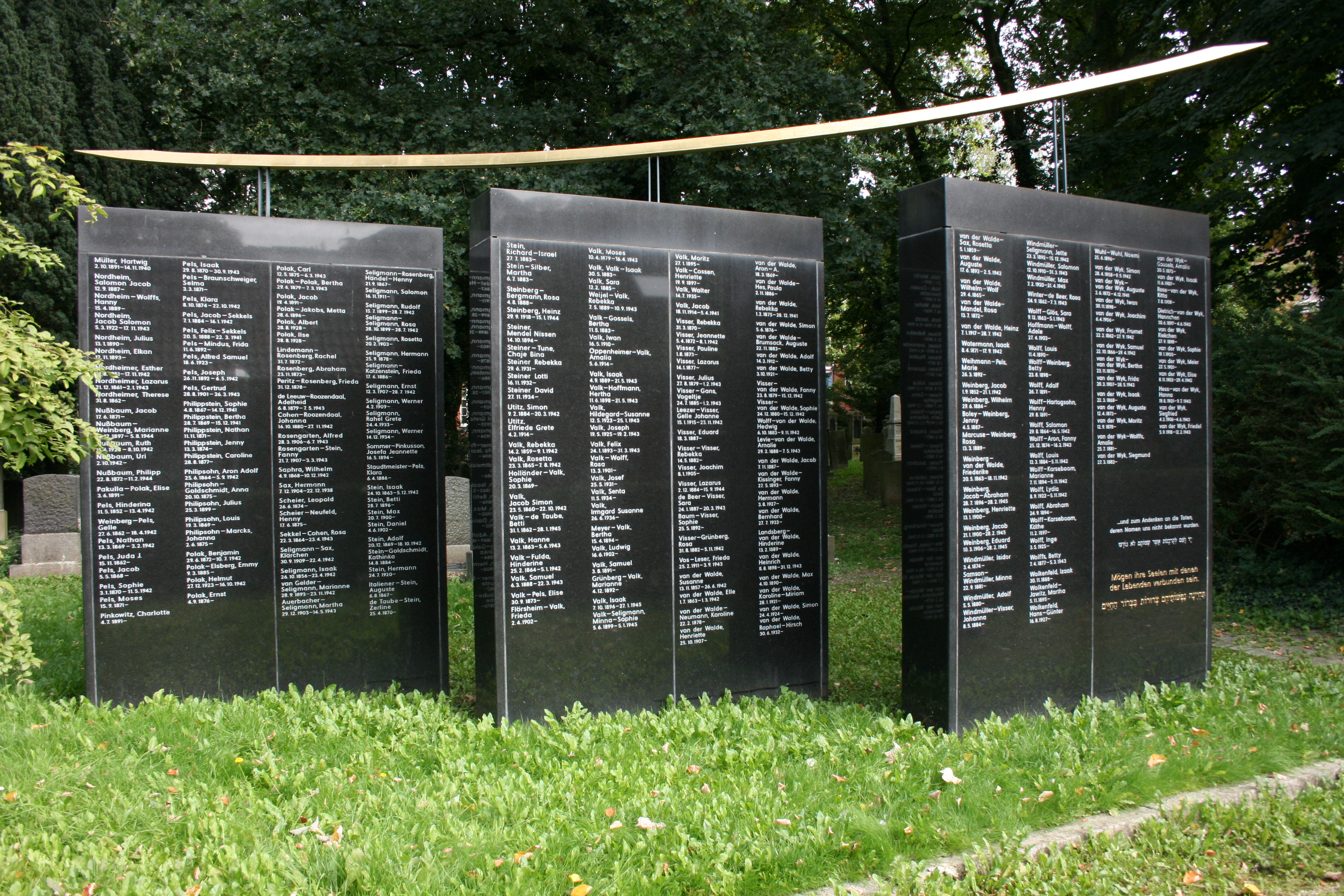
The memorial site in the cemetery

A Jodenkerckhoff (Jewish burial ground) is first mentioned in 1586 on the Konicks-Rebersweg in Emden. Whether this refers to the cemetery in Tholenswehr or merely an economically unusable plot of land remains unclear.

The oldest known and reliably localized cemetery of the community was located outside the historic city center at Treckfahrtstief in Tholenswehr. It served as a burial ground for the Jewish population of Oldersum, Weener, Bunde, Jemgum, and Stapelmoor until 1670. In that year, the representatives of the Jews of Rheiderland appealed to the Princess Christine Charlotte. They asked to "graciously consent that we may purchase at a reasonable price about half or a full Diemat of land for us at our location (Leerort) in said office (Amt) and use the same as a burial ground for our dead." The Princess granted this request, so the Rheiderland Jews were able to establish their own cemetery in Smarlingen near Weener. The Tholenswehr cemetery continued to be used by the Emden community until 1703. Today no stones are visibly preserved there. Many likely sank into the soft sand at the edge of the canal. In a photograph published in 1933, only three grave slabs could be seen. When a street was laid out in 1953, workers discovered 26 gravestones, which were transferred a year later in 1954 to the cemetery on Bollwerkstraße. Today a public green space occupies the area of the former cemetery. A memorial stone recalls the former function of the site. Furthermore, the inscriptions of some grave slabs from the 17th century are documented.

In 1703, a new cemetery was established within the city fortifications over a former mill enclosure on Schoonhovenstraße (later Sandpfad, today Bollwerkstraße). How the community came to own the land is unclear. From 1703 to about 1708, Marranos also lived in Emden. They may have used this cemetery jointly, possibly even purchased it, and after their departure may have transferred it to the Emden Jewish community. The source material on this is contradictory. The cemetery served the community as a burial ground until its end during the Nazi period.

After the war, some returned families attempted to rebuild a Jewish community in Emden. This endeavor failed, however, when many members emigrated to the newly founded state of Israel. Subsequently, the site fell into disrepair. In 1980, unknown parties desecrated the cemetery. They toppled approximately 150 monuments. Many gravestones broke in the process. The city subsequently closed the cemetery to the public. Students of the Vocational Schools in Emden constructed the cemetery gate in 1982.

The city of Emden decided in 1989 to erect a memorial at the cemetery site. On August 28, 1990, Regional Rabbi Henry Brandt from Hannover dedicated this memorial. It consists of three granite stelae on which the names of 465 murdered Emden Jews are inscribed. In 2001, restoration of the graves began. The German Foundation for Monument Protection, the city of Emden, Thyssen AG, the Regional Association of Jewish Communities in Lower Saxony, and the Arbeitskreis der Juden in Emden e. V. (today the Max-Windmüller-Society) financed the project with approximately 400,000 euros. Today burials at the cemetery are rare. It is now publicly accessible again.

== Description ==
The cemetery on Bollwerkstraße covers a total of 4,863 square meters. The oldest graves date to 1706. In total, 798 gravestones and 15 fragments are preserved.
