= Ariadna Scriabina =

Russian poet and activist in the French Resistance (1905-1944)

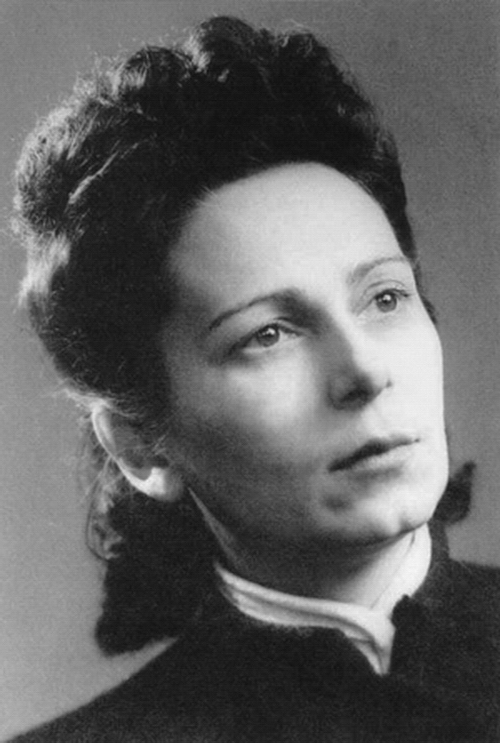
- Born: 26 October 1905; Bogliasco, Italy
- Died: 22 July 1944 (aged 38); Toulouse, France
- Occupations: Poet, activist of French Resistance
- Writing career
- Pen name: Régine
- Language: Russian

Ariadna Aleksandrovna Scriabina (Russian: Ариадна Александровна Скрябина; also Sarah Knut, née Ariadna Alexandrovna Schletzer, pseudonym Régine; 26 October 1905 – 22 July 1944) was a Russian poet and activist of the French Resistance, who co-founded the Zionist resistance group Armée Juive. She was posthumously awarded the Croix de Guerre and Médaille de la Résistance.

She was the eldest daughter of the Russian composer Alexander Scriabin and Tatyana Schloetzer. After the death of her father, Ariadna took his last name, and after the death of her mother she was exiled in Paris. Being part of the literary circles of the Russian Diaspora, she wrote and published poetry. She married three times, last time with poet Dovid Knut (real name Duvid Meerovich Fiksman). Together with her husband she supported the ideas of Revisionist Zionism. She was baptised in an Orthodox rite as a child, but later converted to Judaism taking the Hebrew name Sarah.

During the German occupation of France, she was the organizer and active member of the Jewish resistance in the south of the country. She was murdered in Toulouse by a Milice agent shortly before the fall of the Vichy regime.

== Biography ==
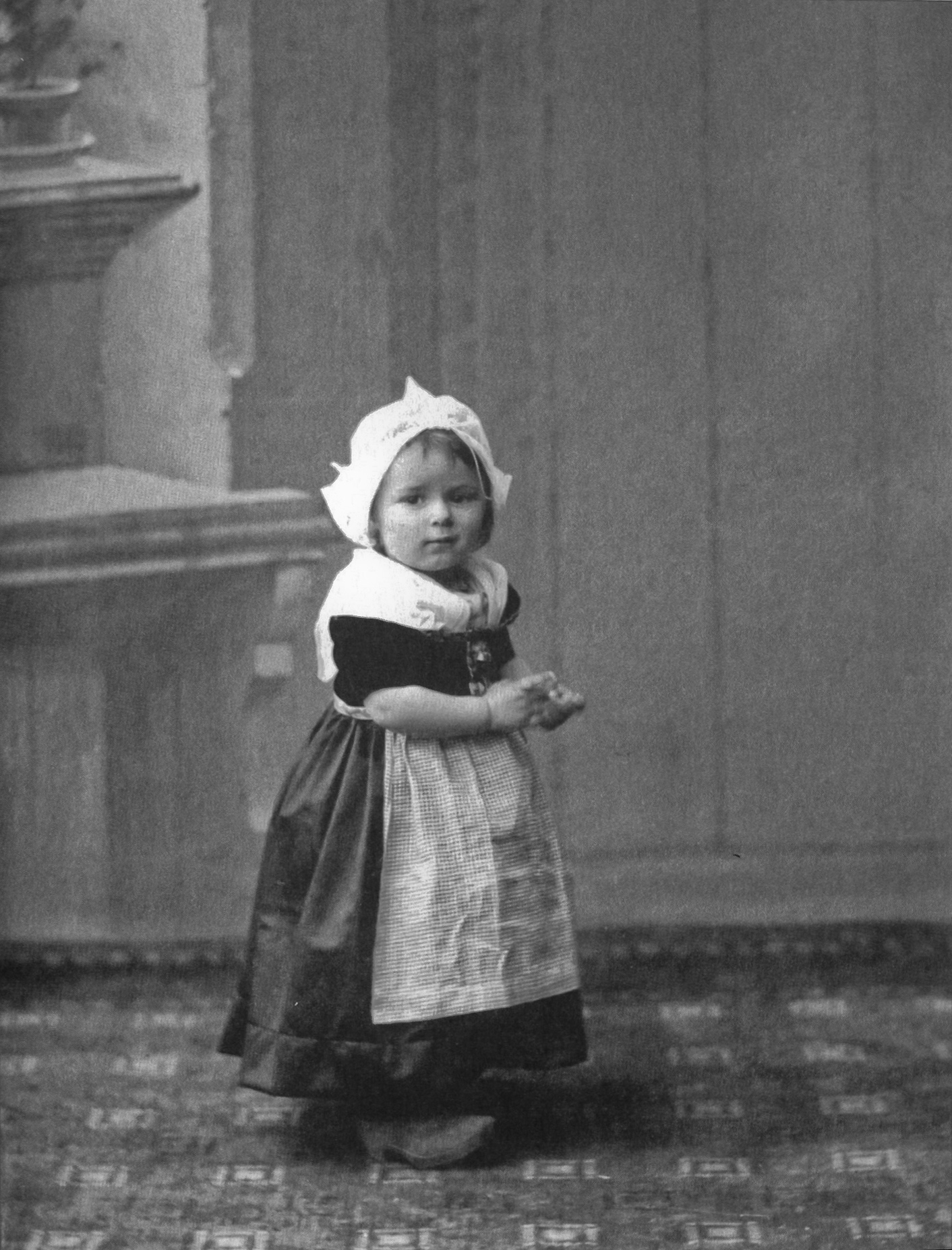
Ariadna at the age of two or three in Amsterdam

Alexander Scriabin had seven children; four from the first marriage to Vera Ivanovna Scriabina: Rima (1898–1905), Elena (1900–1990), Maria (1901–1989) and Lev (1902–1910), and three from the relationship with Tatyana Fyodorovna Schletzer: Ariadna, Julian and Marina. By 1910, Scriabin lived with Schletzer; although he was formally married to Vera Scriabina, they did not meet even at the funeral of their son Lev.

=== Ariadna Schletzer ===
Ariadna Schletzer, the eldest daughter of Scriabin and Schletzer, was born in the Ligurian seaside village of Bogliasco north west Italy, where Scriabin worked on The Poem of Ecstasy.

==== Europe ====
It was an unstable period for Scriabin, who had been moving around Europe for several years. In July 1905, his eldest daughter Rima died in Switzerland, and the birth of Ariadna finalized his separation with a legitimate wife. In December, he broke his longstanding relations with Belyayev's publishing house, which halved their fees shortly after the death of the founder, Mitrofan Belyayev. As a result, Scriabin lost his source of income for a year, until the new owners reconsidered their offer.

In late January 1906, Scriabin moved his new family to Geneva, and in the fall to Amsterdam. He and his wife went to a concert tour in Belgium, United States and Paris, while Ariadna was watched by Schletzer's aunts, Henriette and Alina Boti. In the summer of 1907, Schletzer brought Ariadna in the Swiss village of Beatenberg, where she was soon joined by Scriabin. In September, the family moved to Lausanne, where their next child Julian was born in a few months.

==== Russia ====
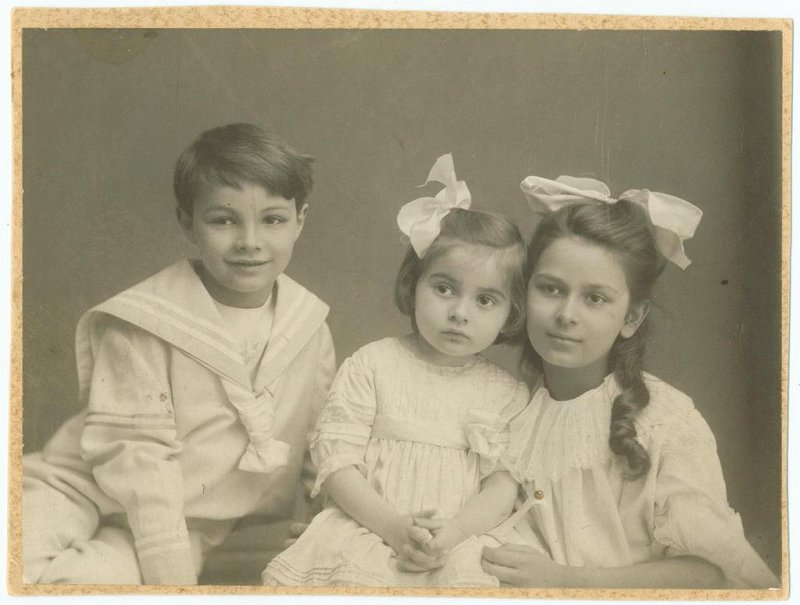
Ariadna, Marina and Julian c. 1913

Scriabin had long thought of returning to Russia. However, his reputation was spoiled by his scandalous character and dubious family situation, and thus the return was delayed to February 1910.

In Moscow, Ariadna was baptized in the Orthodox rite, and in November 1912 her sister Marina was born.

Scriabin's children were mostly raised by tutors, as both Scriabin and his wife were preoccupied with their public lives. French was spoken within the family, which was frequently visited by poets, artists, theatre workers and philosophers. Ariadna from an early age wrote poetry and studied at the Moscow Conservatory. Julian showed talents as a composer, and Marina was trained as a painter. The house had a rich library, and the children received most lessons from private teachers and their mother.

With the outbreak of World War I, life become harder, and to support his family Scriabin had to spend much time playing concerts in various Russian cities. Scriabin himself welcomed the war, hoping for changes after it was over.

=== Ariadna Scriabina ===
==== Ukraine ====
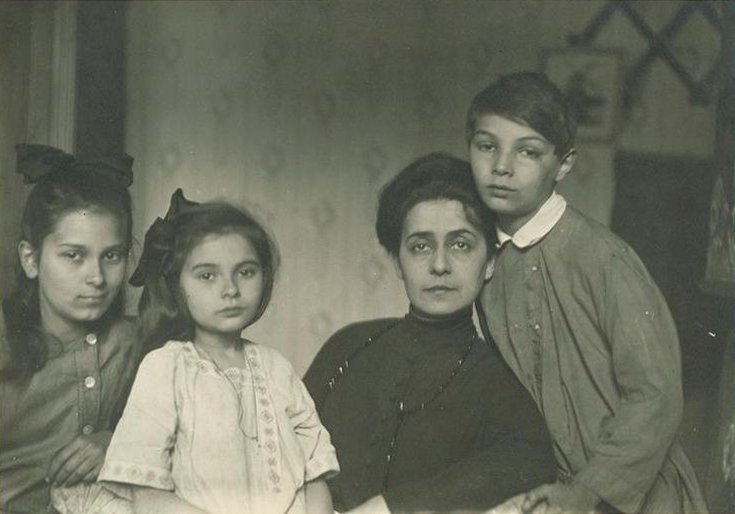
Tatyana Schletzer with Ariadna, Marina and Julian, Moscow, 1918

On 14 April 1915 Scriabin died of sepsis (blood infection), leaving the family without the source of income. Thanks to the efforts of family friends, the legal wife of Scriabin, Vera, accepted the status of Ariadna, Marina and Julian as Scriabin's children. As a result, they were allowed to carry his name.

Schletzer gradually managed to collect some money for the family and focused on raising Julian, whom she saw as the successor of Alexander Scriabin. Two revolutions in 1917 again undermined the barely established family life. In 1918, famine spread through Moscow, and Schletzer took the children to Kiev, located in a better-fed Ukraine.

The Soviet government decided to organize Scriabin's museum in his Moscow house, and Schletzer was asked to assist in this matter. While she was away, in June 1919, Julian drowned in the Dnieper River. Since then, Ariadna developed a fear of deep water for life.

Julian's death shattered Schletzer. She took Marina to Moscow, while placing Ariadna in the boarding school in Novocherkassk. However, the school was soon closed down, and Ariadna was sent to her sister and mother in Moscow.

==== Moscow ====
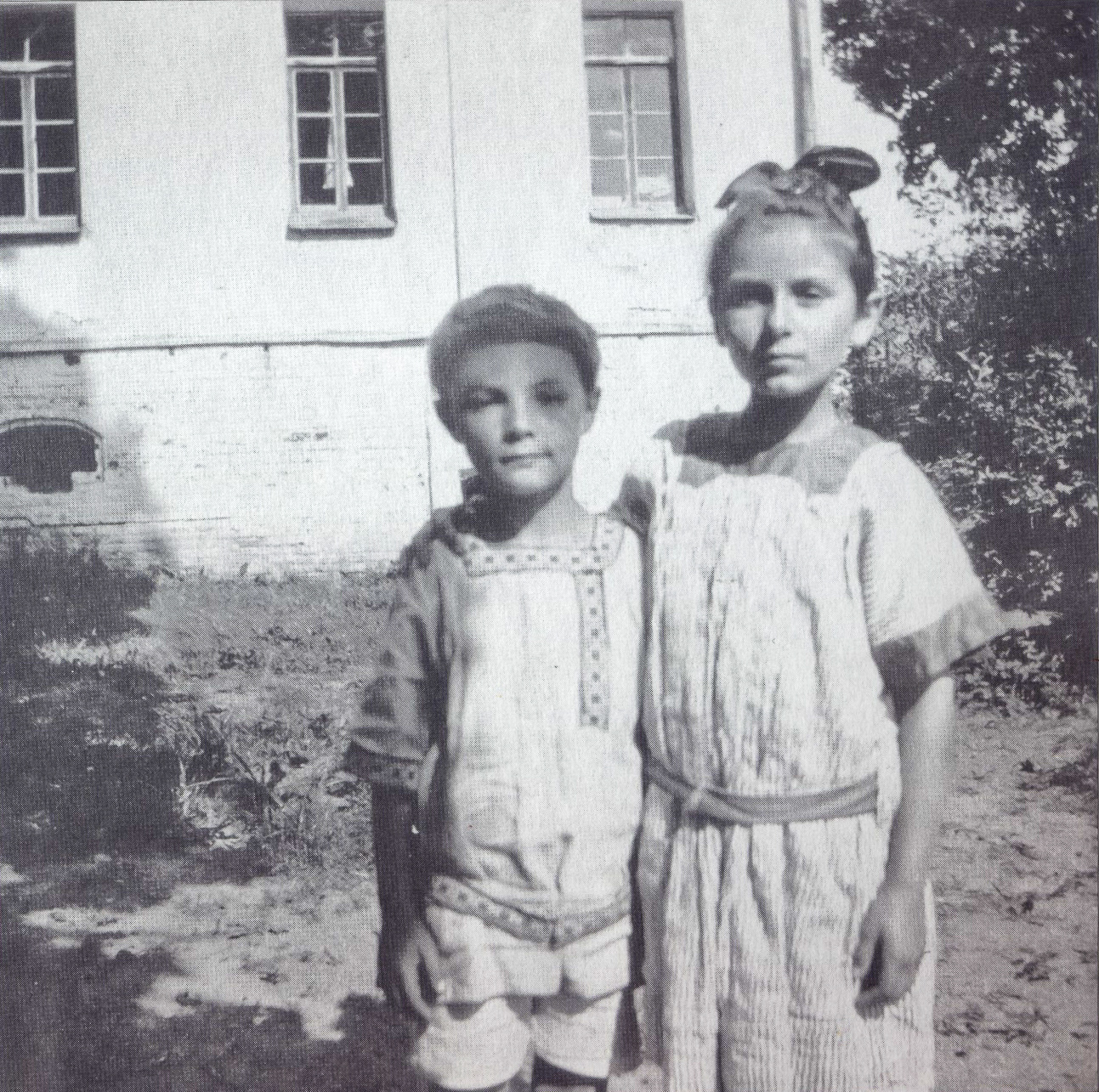
Julian Scriabin and Ariadna Scriabina, 1913

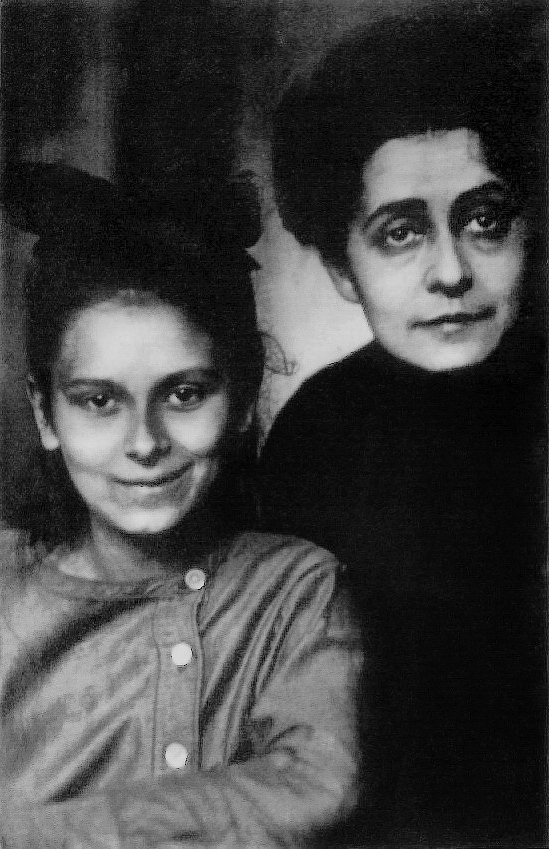
Ariadna with her mother, Moscow, 1918

By that time, Ariadna already developed a strong and edgy personality. Although she was disliked in school due to her noble origin and temperament, she simply ignored that. By that time, she set herself a goal to become a distinguished poet.

Her favourites in literature were Dostoevsky, Shakespeare and the ancient Greeks, for their well-defined style and dramatism. She also liked the poems of Alexander Blok and Konstantin Balmont. She loved to recite the line of Balmont "I want to be the first in the world, on land and on the water".

At 15, she was composing verses together with her sister Marina under the collective pseudonym Mirra. Those verses were often devoted to Russian names and followed the style of Marina Tsvetaeva, who was a family friend. When writing alone, Ariadna used the pen name Ariadna Orlitskaya – while she adored her father, she did not want to ride on his fame.

One year before graduation, Ariadna decided to leave school and enroll in college. She was joined by Katia Zhdanko, her friend from Novocherkassk whom she treated like a sister. They both passed the entrance exams. In college, Ariadna attended only lectures that she liked: linguistics and orthoepy, the history of Western literature, poetics, and aesthetics.

In January 1922, her college was closed down, and in March her mother died after a long period of depression. She was buried at Novodevichy Cemetery, next to her husband. The sisters had to vacate their Moscow flat which was to become the Scriabin's museum. They left Russia for Europe – Maria went to relatives in Belgium and Ariadna to her uncle, Boris de Schloezer, in Paris.

==== Paris ====
Little is known about Ariadna's first years in Europe. As most other immigrants, she needed money for living. She enrolled to the philological faculty in Sorbonne, but was not much interested in the lectures. Around 1923 she entered the Russian poet club, which was also attended by her future husband, Dovid Knut.

==== Attempt at writing and first marriage ====
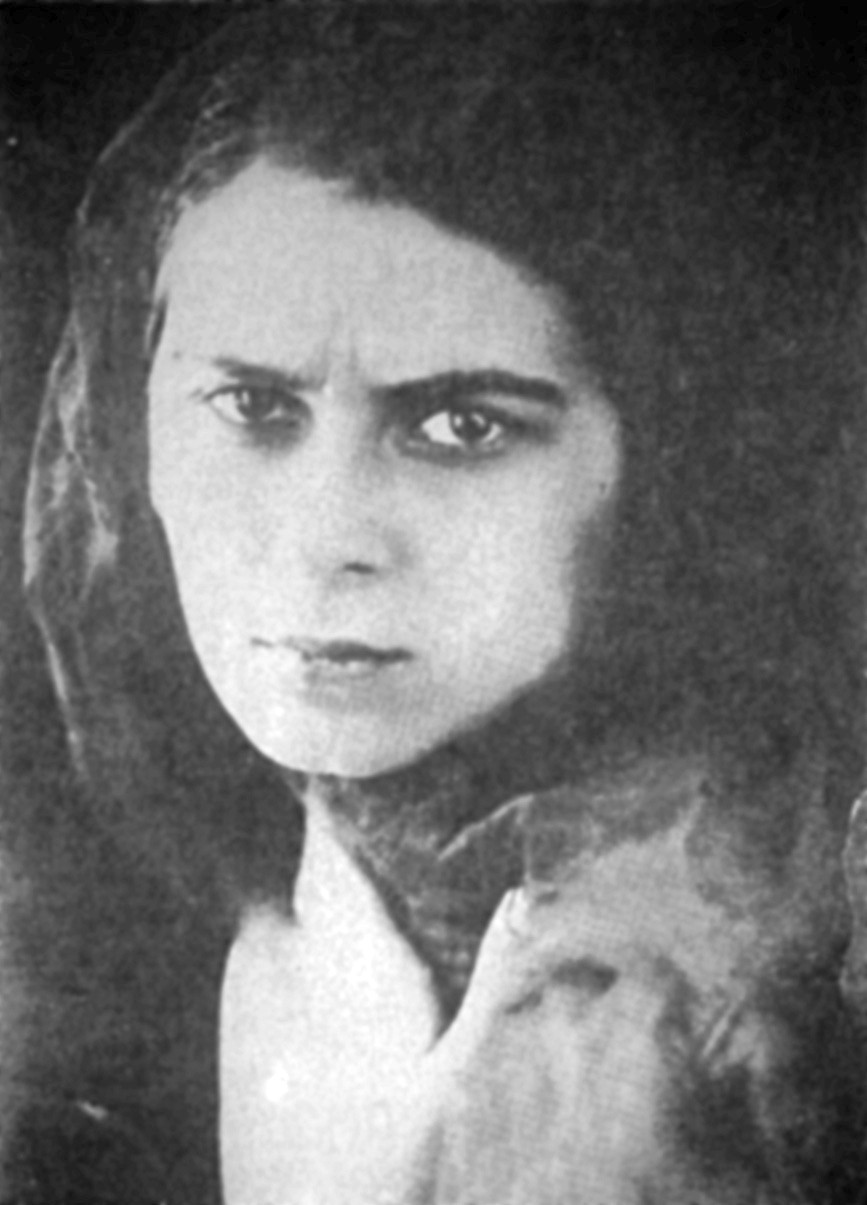
Ariadna in Paris, 1924

Next year Ariadna published her collection of poetry, entitled simply as "Poems". It was criticised by Georgy Adamovich for lack of original style, whereas Semyon Liberman describes them as smooth, competent, pleasant, middle-level verses. The key poem of the collection was dedicated to Boris de Schloezer and prefaced with lines of "Poem of Ecstasy" by her father.

In early 1924 she married the French composer Daniel Lazarus. She surprised him by her extraordinary looseness, sometimes bordering arrogance. She smoked a lot, drank vodka with no hesitation, and was always hungry – a consequence of the difficult years in Russia – although she remained skinny through her whole life, weighing about 47 kg. As before, she ignored manners and bystanders – this all attracted Lazarus, who felt her dominance even though he was seven years older and was wounded in battles of World War I. He also adored Scriabin, and thus his daughter. He conquered her heart by setting to music three of her poems; however, his relatives did not approve of his choice, calling Ariadna "gypsy."

The wedding solved financial problems of Ariadna, but brought other problems. While pregnant, she slipped while stepping off a tram and had a miscarriage; she was poorly received by her husband's family; finally, she was dissatisfied with her poetry.

Later Ariadna gave birth to two daughters, Tatiana-Miriam (3 February 1925) and Gilbert-Elizabeth (Betty; 1926). Soon after birth of Betty, Ariadna left Lazarus, taking both daughters with her.

==== Second marriage ====
Pianist Vladimir Sofronitsky visited Paris in 1928 with his wife Elena, the beloved step-sister of Ariadna. After a fight with Vladimir, Elena sent him to Russia and remained in Paris, staying close with Ariadna for years.

During those years, Ariadna met and married French writer René Méjean. While Méjean was same type of aristocrat as Lazarus, his family was rather friendly to Ariadna and did not mind that she had two children from a broken marriage. The marriage somewhat spoiled the friendship between Ariadna and Elena, who finally returned to her husband in Russia.

Ariadna soon became disillusioned with Méjean. While being pregnant, she told him that he was not the child's father, thereby breaking his heart. She later told her son that his father was Knut, and Méjean learned that the child was his only in his old age. She also persuaded Knut to support her story.

==== Romance with Knut ====
Paris was then the capital of Russian exile, where Russian immigrants visited Russian cafes, restaurants, shops and hairdressers, and published Russian newspapers, magazines and books. Most marriages were performed within the community, and the children attended Russian kindergartens and schools. However, Russian Jews separated within this community, and Ariadna associated herself with them, so as her third husband Dovid Knut.

Knut was a Bessarabian Jew, the son of a grocer born in Chișinău. After the annexation of Bessarabia to Romania he moved to Paris where he took all kind of odd jobs, eventually opening a cheap restaurant and employing his sisters and a younger brother.

Knut admired the poetry of Alexander Pushkin, and began to publish his own poems back in Chișinău, His poetry and character fit very well into the nature of Ariadna.

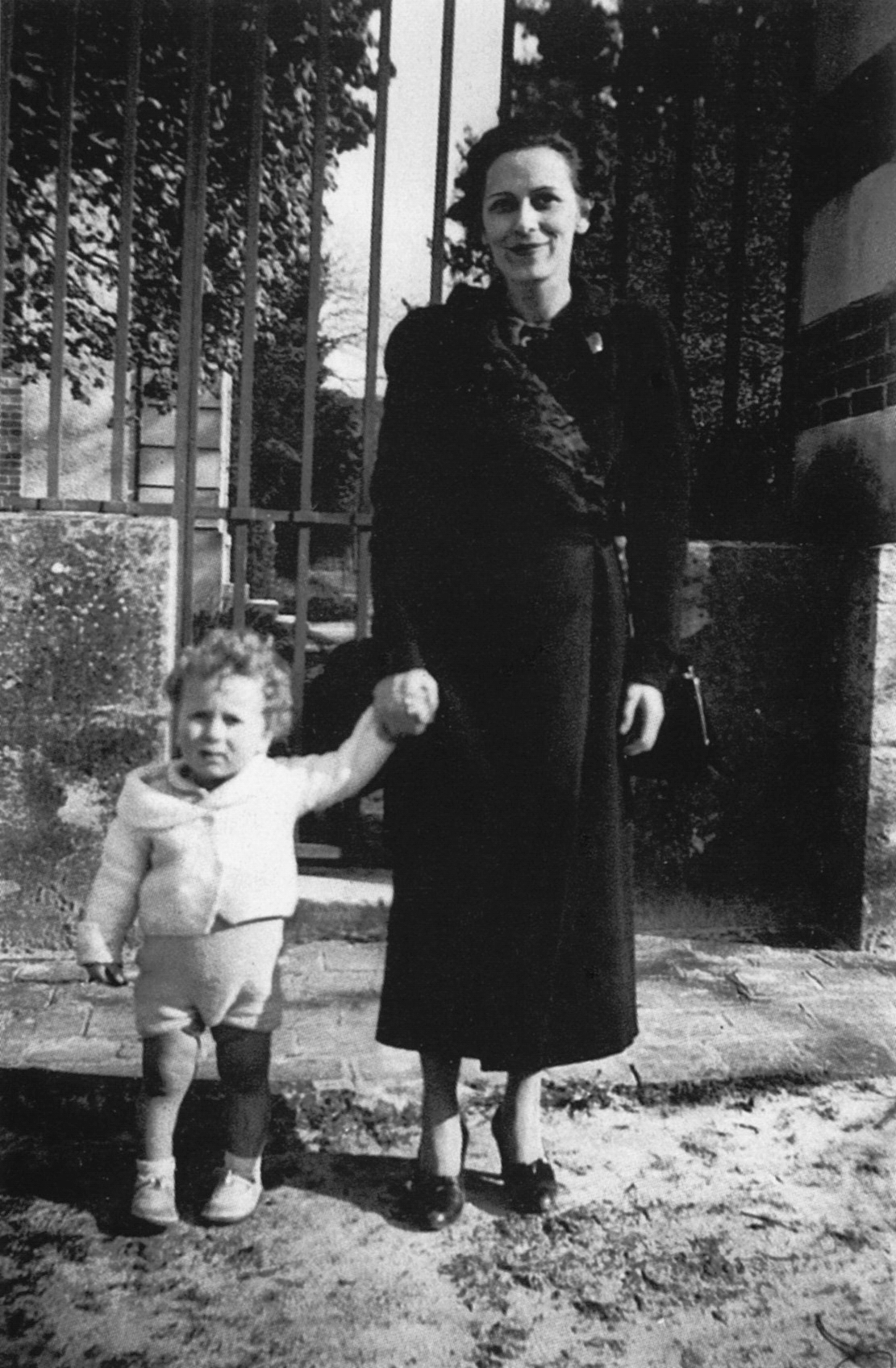
Ariadna with son Eli, Paris, 1938

They started dating in late 1934, 10 years after their first acquaintance. Although Ariadna ran away from Méjean, he remained friendly with Knut until at least late 1936. Ariadna and Méjean officially divorced only in 1937, whereas Knut parted with his first wife in 1933.

After her disappointing poetry experience, Ariadna turned to the prose and for many years worked on a novel about a Jewish girl named Leah Livshits, which she never finished. She usually worked in bed, while smoking, and disliked to be interrupted by anyone. She was a poor housewife, and was always in need for money; yet her housemaids liked her and stayed even when they received no payment.

==== Zionism ====
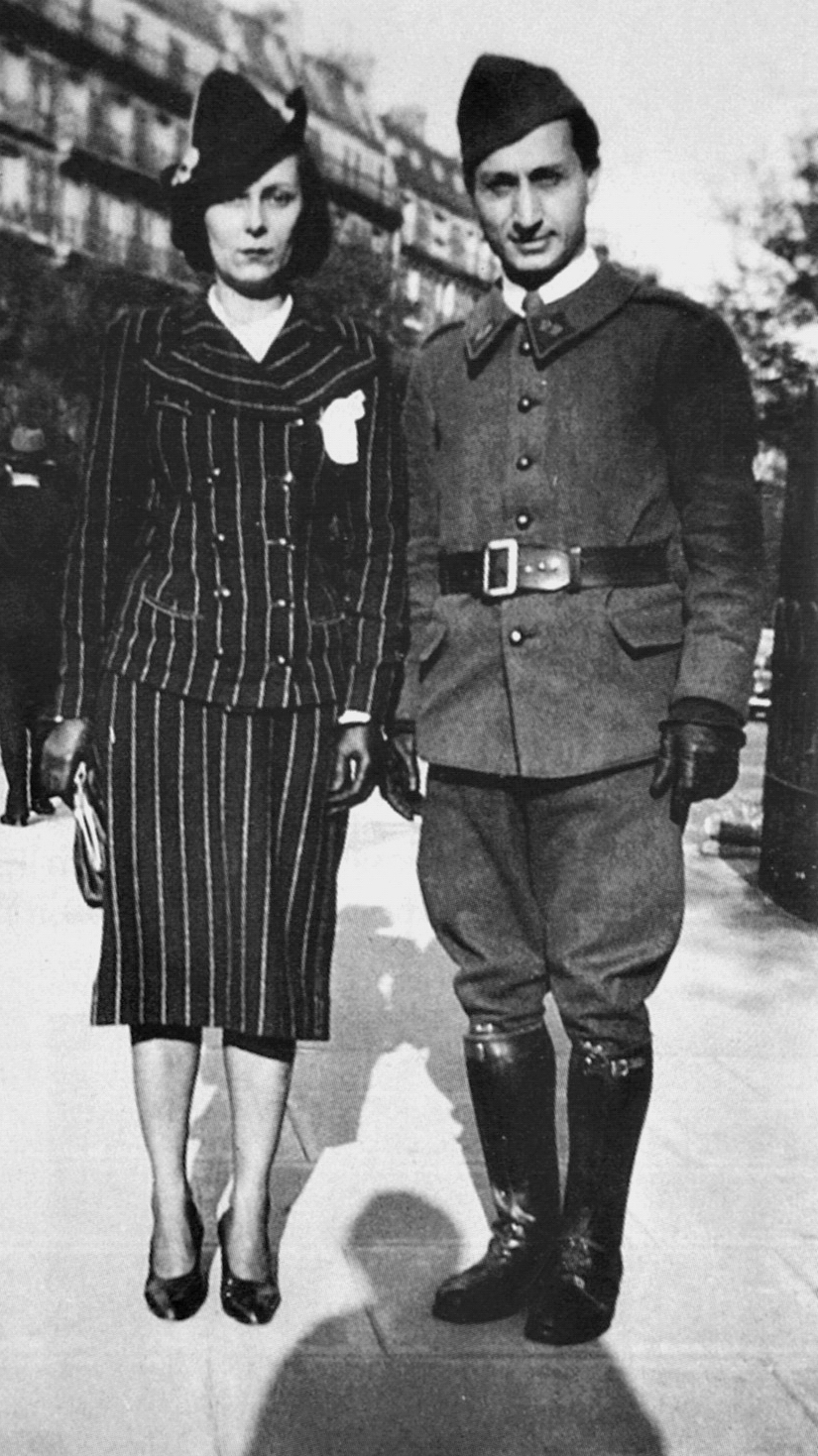
Ariadna and Dovid Knut, Paris, autumn 1939

Ariadna and Dovid Knut anxiously followed the growth of anti-Semitism in Europe, especially in Germany. Gradually, they both became convinced Zionists, and Ariadna went up to even a more extreme position than Dovid. For her Zionism was rather a passion than an abstract idea. She became intolerant to even slightest manifestations of anti-Semitism to the point that many Jews felt embarrassed by her overreaction. For example, she once said that the only two ways to solve the "Arab problem" would be to expel them from "our land" or cut their throats.

In early 1939, Dovid and Ariadna managed to start publication of a newspaper Affirmation that aimed at awakening the national consciousness of the Jews. Dovid acted not only as an editor, but as a journalist. The appearance of the newspaper was an important event for the Jews of Paris and in August 1939, Knuts were invited to the XXI World Zionist Congress in Geneva.

=== Sarah ===
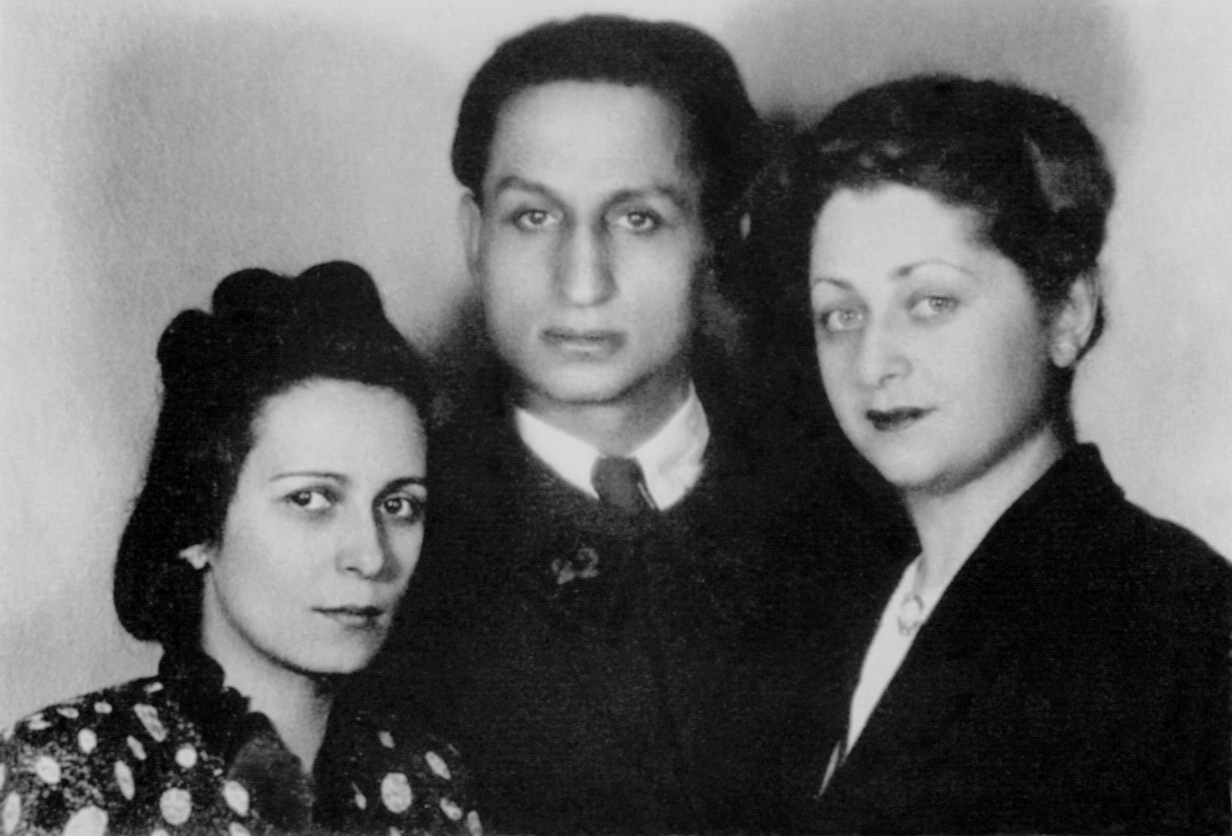
Ariadna, Dovid and their long-time friend Eva Kirchner, Paris, February–March 1940

A week after the Congress, the Second World War started. Knut was mobilized to the French Army on the first day of the war, 1 September 1939, and the newspaper had to close. He served in Paris, and on 30 March 1940 he and Ariadna finally registered their marriage. A few days later, Ariadna converted to Judaism and took the name Sarah. She then demanded all friends to call her only by the new name.

Ariadna's conversion to Judaism was perceived as "betrayal" by the predominantly Christian Russian immigrant community.

With the approach of German troops to the capital, the military unit of Knut was moved to the south, while Ariadna stayed in Paris with the children. She started working at a plant, but it was closed only three days later as people started fleeing from Paris. Boris de Schloezer called her into the Pyrenees, but she refused to leave without her husband. Shortly before Germans entered Paris, she moved to her husband in Toulouse.

==== Toulouse ====
Toulouse was in the so-called "free zone", which saw no battles and occupation forces till November 1942, but had local "milice" set by the Vichy regime. The attitude toward Jews was so tense that Knuts stopped speaking Russian and used French even with their children. Most Jews tried to flee through Marseille to South America; Knuts tried too, but failed. Life was poor and hard, and they took any jobs available.

==== Armée Juive ====
In early 1942, Dovid and Ariadna published a brochure titled "What to do?" (French: Que faire?) on the problems of Jews in World War II, where they argued the need for a Jewish underground organization. Dovid read the brochure to several Zionists in Toulouse, but only Abraham Polonski agreed with him while others found the idea of an underground fighting suicidal. Meanwhile, Polonski had an experience of creating an underground Jewish organization during the Civil War in Russia. He was arrested, but managed to escape through Germany and Belgium to Toulouse. There he graduated from the Faculty of Engineering at the University of Toulouse and later opened his own thriving business. Despite the objections of Zionists, Knuts, Polonski and his wife formed an organization, which was first named Bnei David ("descendants of David") and later Armée Juive ("Jewish army").

For conspiracy reasons, Sarah-Ariadna took a nickname – Régine. She came up with an oath and a ceremony carried out when joining Armée Juive, which over the years was followed by almost 2000 people.

Armée Juive members were recruited among factory workers, students of the University of Toulouse and in the synagogues. Their first tasks were fairly simple, such as bringing food to Jewish refugees from Germany, which were kept in harsh conditions in the Camp du Récébédou near Toulouse. Later they started collecting weapons and sensitive information, hiding high-risk Jews at remote farms and monasteries and ferrying them to Switzerland and Spain. They also committed acts of sabotage against the Nazis and their collaborators. Ariadna was involved in one of the most difficult and dangerous task of ferrying Jewish children whose parents were deported to the camps. Children were taught to not cause any suspicion and properly react to unforeseen events during the travel.

Military actions of Armée Juive were mostly limited to killing selected milice agents who were involved in spotting Jews on streets. Weapons for this task mostly originated from the British air drops, which were intended for French partisans, but those sometimes could not locate the landing sites.

==== Betty ====
Betty, the youngest daughter of Ariadna, lived in relative safety with Boris de Schloezer. However, he eventually became suspected as a Jew and a communist and jailed for several days. Later, Betty wrote to her mother about her intention to convert to Catholicism. This enraged Ariadna, who immediately had Betty brought to Toulouse. With a help of Rabbi Roitman, she convinced her to follow Judaism and gradually made her involved in the underground activities.

==== Death ====
In November 1942, police arrested Arnold Mandel, a member of Armée Juive who was a friend of Knuts back from Paris. Mandel gave the name and address of Knut, but the underground learned about it through their informants, and when the police raided the flat they found no criminal evidence. Yet Knut fell under suspicion and was sent to Switzerland. Being absorbed into underground activities, Ariadna refused to join him, despite being pregnant.

On 22 May 1943 she gave birth to Joseph, and in November–December sent Eli, Tatiana-Miriam and Joseph to Switzerland.

By early 1944 Armée Juive was strong enough to form a separate Jewish Legion to help the Allied forces in the liberation of France. For this purpose, they met with British representatives in Marseille and then in Paris. However, when they sent two representatives to London, they were caught by Gestapo on the way to the Paris airport. Shortly thereafter, Gestapo arrested 25 activists of Armée Juive following the lead of their agent.

On 22 July 1944, Ariadna had an appointment regarding the promotion of a new member of Armée Juive. She and her companion Raul Leon were ambushed by two milice agents, one of whom retreated for reinforcement while the other held the suspects at gunpoint. While waiting, Leon grabbed an empty bottle and threw it at the agent. The agent instinctively fired his machine gun in response, killing Ariadna on the spot. Leon managed to escape, despite being wounded in both legs, and later provided a detailed account of the event.

== Legacy and family ==
A LA MEMOIRE

De Régine Adriane Fixman
Tombée Héroiquementa a l'ennemi
le 22-7-44 Pour la Défense
de l'Honneur du Peuple Juif et
de Notre Patrie Eretz-Israel

Monument des Jeunesses Sionistes
de Toulouse

Toulouse was liberated three weeks after the death of Ariadna. She was posthumously awarded the Croix de Guerre and Médaille de la Résistance. There is a plaque on the wall of a house where she was killed.

After the war, Dovid Knut acted as editor of Bulletin du Centre de Documentation Juive Contemporaine and for a while lived in the house where he had previously published Affirmation. Archives of Affirmation, the pre-war poems of Knut, and the unfinished novel of his wife had been lost. In 1947, he published the book on "The history of the Jewish Resistance in France, 1940–1944" (French: Contribution a L'Histoire de la Resistance Juive en France 1940–1944), and in 1949 his "Selected Poems". In 1948, he married the 17-year-old actress Virginia Sharovskaya. Jewish through one of her parents, she converted to Judaism to become Leah Knut. In October 1949 they emigrated to Israel, where Knut died in 1955 from a brain tumour.

Tatiana-Miriam married the composer and pianist Robert Cornman (1924–2008). She wrote a book in French about her parents, which was first translated into Russian and published in Russia. It is entitled in French: "Et c'est ma soif que j'aime", also translated into German as "Meine Liebe gilt meinem Durst". Tatiana-Miriam tried in this book to soften the image of Ariadna.

Betty Knut was involved with the French resistance and later became a war correspondent. She had a rank of lieutenant in the U.S. Army and received the Silver Star personally from George S. Patton, as well as the French Croix de Guerre. When crossing the Rhine, her jeep hit a landmine, leaving Betty with a serious shrapnel wound to the head. She recovered, but suffered from headaches for the rest of her life. She published a popular book La Ronde de Mouche on her military experiences. In the US she married a demobilized American soldier, a Jew. They had three children. After the war she became an active member of the Lehi (Stern Gang), undertaking special operations for the militant group and she became famous after being imprisoned in 1947 for planting explosives on British ships which had been trying to prevent Jewish immigrants from travelling to Mandatory Palestine. After her release from prison, she settled at the age of 23 in Beersheba in Southern Israel, where she opened a nightclub, before her early death at the age of 38 – the same age her mother and grandmother had died.

Eli (born 22 June 1935) moved to Israel in 1945, graduated from the Naval College in Haifa, and became a sailor. After demobilization, he continued sailing with the merchant navy until 1960, and then taught guitar in Rosh Pinna. He is now retired.

Joseph (born 22 May 1943) lived with Dovid Knut in Israel, where he served in the special forces. He became disabled after inadvertently shooting himself in the head. He demobilized and studied French literature at Tel Aviv University. He published a book of memoirs about his father and his own collection of poems in Hebrew.

Her great-grandson Elisha Abas has become a concert pianist.

== Bibliography ==
- Kashperova, А. V., ed. (2003). А. Н. Скрябин. Письма. Moscow: Muzyka.
- Khazan, V. I. (1997). Материалы к биографии Д. Кнута // Кнут Д. Собрание сочинений. Vol. 1. Jerusalem: Еврейский университет, Кафедра русских и славянских исследований. ISBN 965-222-798-6.
- Lazaris, V. (2000). Три женщины. Tel Aviv: Lado.
- Pryanishnikova, M. P.; Tompakova, О. M., eds. (1985). Летопись жизни и творчества А. Н. Скрябина. Moscow: Muzyka.
- Rybakova, T. V. (1994). Марина Цветаева и дом А. Н. Скрябина. Moscow: IRIS-PRESS. ISBN 5-87390-005-1.
- Sabaneev, L. L. (1925). Воспоминания о Скрябине. Moscow: Музыкальный сектор государственного издательства.
- Scriabin, A. S. (2009). Трагедия и подвиг Т. Ф. Шлёцер // А. Н. Скрябин в пространствах культуры ХХ века. Moscow: Kompozitor. ISBN 978-5-85285-313-4.
- Shapiro, G. (1986). "Десять писем Довида Кнута // Cahiers du monde russe et soviétique". Cahiers du Monde Russe. XXVII (2) (2). Paris: 191–208. doi:10.3406/cmr.1986.2076.
- Tompakova, О. М. (1998). Бесподобное дитя века. Ариадна Скрябина. Moscow: Muzyka. ISBN 5-7140-0663-1.
