= Skryabin =

Skryabin, Skrjabin; Scriabine or Scriabin may refer to

- Skryabin (surname)
- Skryabin (band), a Ukrainian pop/rock band
- 6549 Skryabin, a main-belt asteroid named after Alexander Scriabin
