= Skryabin (surname) =

Skryabin, Skrjabin; Scriabine or Scriabin (Russian: Скрябин) is a Russian masculine surname, its feminine form is Skryabina or Scriabina. It may refer to:

- Alexander Scriabin (1872–1915), Russian composer and pianist
- Anastasiya Skryabina (born 1985), Ukrainian alpine skier
- Ariadna Scriabina (1905–1944), Russian poet and activist of the French Resistance, daughter of Alexander
- Constantin Scriabine (1878–1972), Russian helminthologist
- Vyacheslav Molotov, born Vyacheslav Skryabin, (1890–1986), Soviet politician and diplomat
- Timofey Skryabin (born 1967), Soviet boxer
