= Elisha Abas =

Israeli pianist, composer, and footballer (born 1971)

- אלישע אבס
- Born: 1971 (age 54–55)
- Occupations: Pianist; Composer; Football player (former)
- Musical career
- Genres: Classical
- Instrument: Piano
- Sports career
- Sport: Football
- Position: Left back
- Team: Hapoel Petah Tikva; Hapoel Kfar Saba

Elisha Abas (Hebrew: אלישע אבס; born 1971) is an Israeli pianist, composer, and former professional football player.

Abas received his musical training from Israeli pianist and pedagogue Pnina Salzman and benefited from the mentorship of Artur Rubinstein. He performed interpretations of works by composers such as Chopin and Schumann.

== Life and career ==
Abas is the great-great-grandson of Russian composer Alexander Scriabin (1872–1915), via Ariadna Scriabina (1905–22 July 1944), Gilbert-Elizabeth "Betty" Knut-Lazarus (1926–1964), and his mother Ariane Abas (1950–). His father is the Israeli children's author Shlomo Abas (1948–).

Abas began performing at the age of six, sharing the stage with the likes of Isaac Stern, Leonard Bernstein and Zubin Mehta throughout his career. Abas achieved many accolades throughout his career, most notably winning first place in the America Israel Cultural Foundation music competition for eight consecutive years and first place in the Claremont Piano Competition.

At age 14, Abas took a hiatus from music. He began pursuing a career as a professional football player. He played left back for several Israeli teams, first for Hapoel Petah Tikva under coach Avram Grant, then for Hapoel Kfar Saba and several other teams. Injuries forced him to retire from football at the age of 28.

After retiring from football, Abas decided to try and return to playing piano. He contacted Pnina Salzman and began performing again. Today, he continues to perform throughout the world, most recently in North America, Europe, Cuba, Russia, Israel, and China.

Abas is also a composer, but rarely performs his original compositions in public. However, in 2009, he performed his original music in St. Petersburg's Smolny Cathedral, United Nations Assembly Hall, and in Teatro Amadeo Roldán in Havana, Cuba. In December 2009, Abas performed and recorded live the Brahms First Piano Concerto in Havana, Cuba, with the National Symphony Orchestra of Cuba, conducted by Yoel Gamzou. In 2010, he recorded and released a live recording of the Mozart Piano Concerto No. 23 K. 488 with the International Mahler Orchestra in Berlin. He is the co-founder of the Concert Meister Series in New York City.
