= Marina Scriabina =

Russian artist, author, and composer

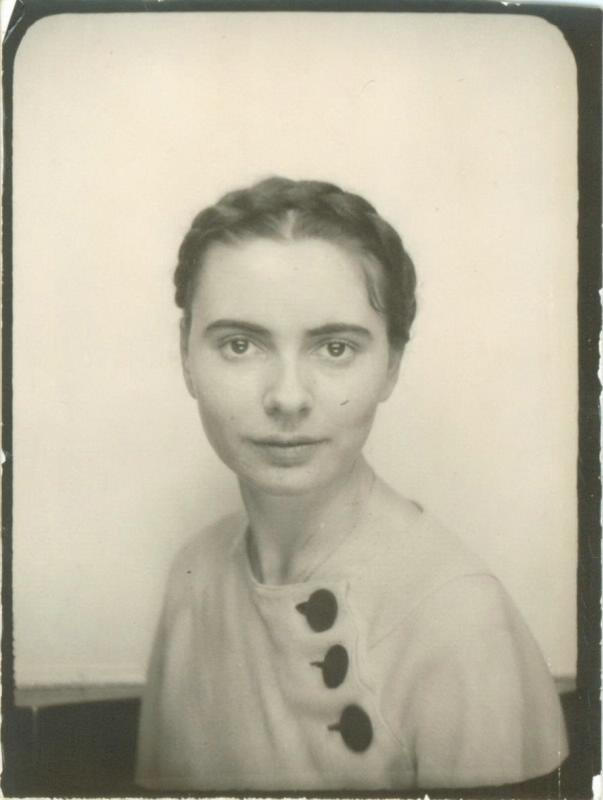
- Born: January 30, 1911; Moscow, Russia
- Died: April 28, 1998 (aged 87); Cormeilles-en-Parisis, France
- Occupations: Composer; Musicologist; Artist; Writer

Marina Scriabina (30 January 1911 - 28 April 1998) was a Russian artist, author, composer and musicologist, who was the daughter of composer Alexander Scriabin and Tatiana Schlözer.

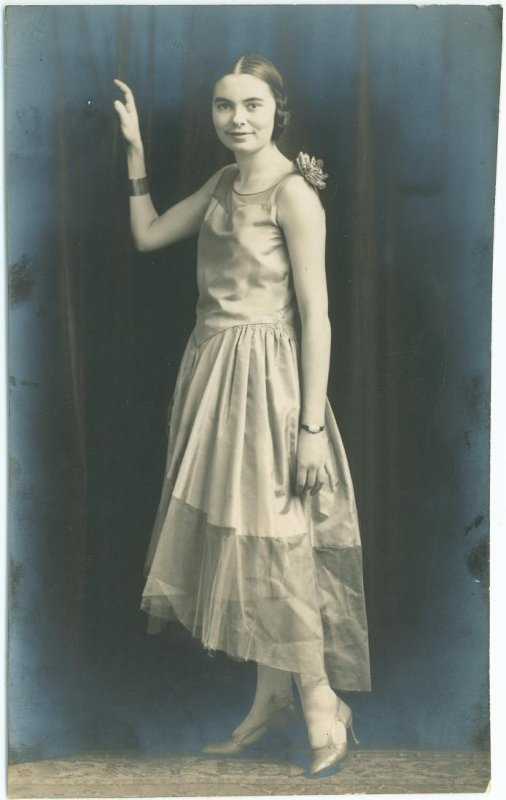
Marina Scriabina in her first evening gown, 1929

Scriabina was born in Moscow. She had two older siblings, Ariadna and Julian, and four older half-siblings from her father’s first marriage. After her father’s death in 1915, she lived with her mother in Moscow and Kiev before going to Belgium to live with her maternal grandmother. In 1927, Scriabina moved to Paris to study art at the Ecole Nationale des Arts Decoratifs in Paris. She also studied music theory with Rene Leibowitz and worked with electronic techniques at Radiodiffusion Francaise, ultimately earning a doctorate in aesthetics in 1967. Her dissertation, entitled Representation du Temps et de Vintemporalité dans les Arts Plastiques Figuratifs, was later published.

Scriabina designed art posters. She also wrote and translated works on music and Egyptian art, often working with her uncle Boris de Schlözer. After moving to France, she socialized with Luciano Berio, Henk Badings, Pierre Boulez, John Cage, Luc Ferrari, Henri Pousseur, Pierre Schaeffer, and Karlheinz Stockhausen.

== Works ==
=== Prose ===
==== Articles ====
- "La Musique et la Chine Ancienne" (Revue française de sociologie, 1962, vol. 3, no 4, pp. 398–406)
- "Vers une Poésie Radiophonique"
- "Writing, Myth and Creativity in Pharaonic Egypt" (with Rosanna Rowland)

==== Books ====
- Au Carrefour de Thebes
- Le Langage Musical
- Le Miroir du Temps
- Notes et Reflexions: Carnets Inedits (by Alexander Scriabin; edited & translated by Marina Scriabina)
- Problems de la Musique Moderne (with Boris de Schlözer)
- Representation du Temps et de Vintemporalité dans les Arts Plastiques Figuratifs

=== Music ===
==== Ballet ====
- Bayalett

==== Chamber ====
- Two Piano Sonatas
- Viola Sonata

==== Electronic ====
- Suite Radiophonique

==== Vocal ====
- Songs
