= Frida Wattenberg =

French resistance fighter (1924–2020)

- Born: 7 April 1924; Paris, France
- Died: 3 April 2020 (aged 95); Paris, France
- Citizenship: France
- Occupation: OPEJ

Frida Wattenberg (7 April 1924 – 3 April 2020) was a member of the French Resistance.

== Biography ==
Wattenberg was born in 1924 to Polish-Jewish émigrés who fled Poland. She grew up in The Marais quarter of Paris. She joined the Hashomer Hatzair movement in the late 1930s. During World War II, she studied at the Lycée Victor Hugo in Paris. Wattenberg also made several collages of posters for the French Resistance.

In 1941, Wattenberg joined the Œuvre de secours aux enfants (OSE), for which she made false papers for Jewish people to escape to the south of France. Her mother was arrested during the Vel' d'Hiv Roundup in 1942, and Wattenberg managed to secure her release by proving that she worked in a factory supplying clothes to members of the German army.

In 1943, Wattenberg went to Grenoble and joined the Jewish Resistance. She accompanied groups of children in Annecy, and aided their passage into Switzerland. Transferred to Toulouse, Wattenberg joined the Armée Juive.

After the Liberation of Paris, she worked at the Œuvre de protection des enfants juifs (OPEJ), whose objective was to welcome and protect children who lost their parents due to deportation. She also campaigned for the designation of Israel.

Frida Wattenberg died on 3 April 2020 at the age of 95 due to COVID-19.

== Decorations ==
- Knight of the Ordre national du Mérite
- Knight of the Legion of Honour
