= Bas Westerweel =

Dutch radio and television presenter (1963–2026)

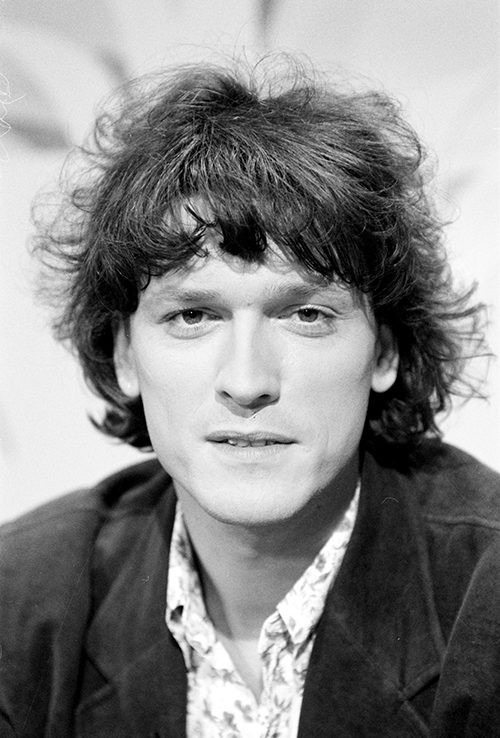
Westerweel in 1991

Bas Westerweel (16 May 1963 – 15 May 2026) was a Dutch television and radio presenter.

== Early life and career ==
In the mid-1980s, Westerweel started as a young talent at the AVRO. He took over, initially together with Léonie Sazias, the presentation of the Toppop program from Kas van Iersel. He was also a substitute on the AVRO Monday on Hilversum 3/ Radio 3. In the 1987–1988 season (Toppop's last year), he was the sole presenter. Among other things, he presented in the spring of 1991 on Nederland 2 De Sleutels van Fort Boyard, children's matinee Alles Kits and in 1995/1997 he presented the adventure game Duel over de grens. He would work for the AVRO for 17 years. He also worked on Het Klokhuis.

From 2002, Westerweel worked as a creative director at a communication consulting and advertising agency that focused on children and young people. In 2005, he voiced Plankton for the Dutch version of the SpongeBob SquarePants Movie. From September 2005 he presented the program Bij ons thuis for Teleac; from the beginning of March 2006 he appeared in the program McDonald's kitchen on LLiNK and from August 2006 in Zomerzin. In September 2006, he participated in the special VIP edition of Beijing Express. In the autumn of 2006 he presented the program Hoofdstad Weesp for TELEAC.

From September 2009 to July 2010, Westerweel played the role of Sam in a production of the musical Mamma Mia!.

== Personal life and death ==
In 2017, at the age of 54, Westerweel suffered a cardiac arrest and underwent surgery.

Westerweel married Dutch actress and singer Babette van Veen in 1998. They announced their divorce in November 2010. They have two sons.

He was a grandson of the resistance fighters Joop and Willy Westerweel.

Westerweel died in Enschede on 15 May 2026, one day before his 63rd birthday.
