= Wieke Bosch =

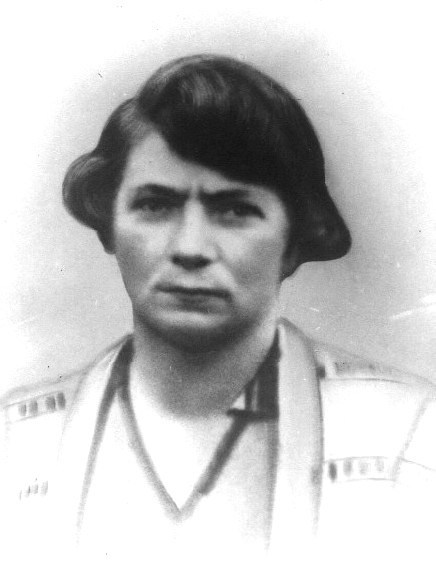
- Born: 20 February 1882; Leeuwarden
- Died: 17 February 1945 (aged 62); Ravensbrück concentration camp
- Other names: Wieke
- Occupation: Anarchist, resistance fighter, house servant

Wieke Bosch (20 February 1882 in Leeuwarden – 17 February 1945 in Ravensbrück) was a Dutch anarchist and feminist resistance fighter. An anarchist since the end of World War I, she campaigned notably for women's rights in the Netherlands.

During the German Occupation, Bosch set up underground press and resistance networks, which notably helped save hidden people and Jews. Arrested on 19 November 1942, she was deported to the Ravensbrück concentration camp, where she was executed by firing squad.

Her life quickly fell into obscurity but was rediscovered in the early 21st century.

== Biography ==
Bosch was born on either 20 or 24 February 1882 in Leeuwarden, Netherlands. Due to her poverty, she could not pursue an education and had to start working at a young age as a housemaid. During this period, she married a Rein Zandstra; the couple had three children. In 1919, the couple separated, and she moved in with an anarchist named Jan de Haan. Both were prominent figures in the anarchist, pacifist, and feminist movements in Leeuwarden during the 1920s and 1930s.

During this period, Bosch notably sold condoms on the street, which was extremely rare, frowned upon, and novel for the time. Because of her activities, she was monitored by Dutch intelligence services, who labeled her as a "state enemy". Jan de Haan died in 1937, but she continued her activism.

=== Resistance ===
While the Netherlands were occupied by Nazi Germany, she established an underground press group called De Vonk, using her existing networks. Her group was not only involved in the publication of clandestine newspapers but also made contact with people in hiding to provide aid and distributed Resistance propaganda. It seems that Bosch also assisted a number of Jews, as she managed to distribute passports without the "J" designation.

=== Deportation and death ===
She was arrested, along with many members of the De Vonk networks, on 19 November 1942, and subsequently incarcerated for many months in Leeuwarden prison. The anarchist managed to clandestinely pass her notes out of the prison, alerting a number of individuals targeted by the investigations. The Nazis first transferred her to the Westerbork transit camp before she was deported to Ravensbrück concentration camp. Bosch arrived there at the age of 60 and received a red triangle. Despite her age, she managed to survive and even organized a part of the Dutch deportees, quickly establishing connections with them.

On 17 February 1945, she was selected to be gassed in the nearby Uckermark camp, but after a technical failure of the gas chambers, the Nazis decided instead to execute the group by shooting. She was stripped and then executed on the spot with a machine gun, along with nine other Dutch deportees.

== Legacy ==
Bosch quickly faded from memory, but her story was rediscovered from the early 21st century. Historian Hessel de Walle published a rediscovery of her life. In 2024, she was added to the Frisian Resistance Monument in Leeuwarden, in the presence of her descendants.

== See also ==
- Anarchism in the Netherlands
- Joop Westerweel, another Dutch anarchist executed by the Nazis
