= Joachim Simon =

World War II rescue movement leader

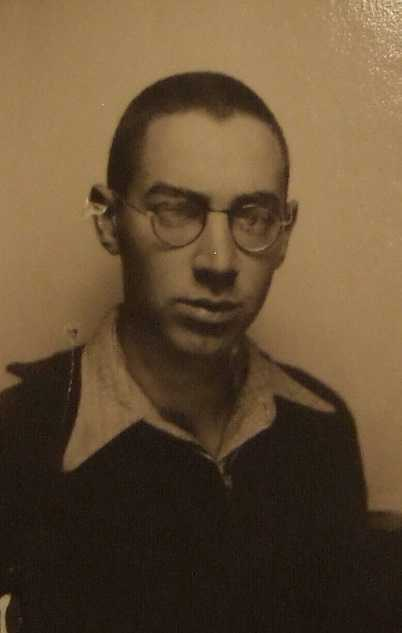
Image of Shushu Simon

Joachim Simon (known as Shushu) (1919–1943) was a Jewish-German leader of a rescue movement during World War II. Simon, along with Joop Westerweel, led a group called the Westerweel Group.

He was a refugee from Berlin in the Netherlands with a group of Jewish "halutzim", youth pioneers receiving agricultural training to be ready to emigrate to Israel. While staying with this group in Loosdrecht, near Amsterdam, Simon met Joop Westerweel, a local Christian pacifist who helped Jewish refugees and formed a close friendship with him. When the young Jewish "pioneers" were threatened with being deported Simon, Joop Westerweel and their resistance group worked to find hiding places. Then they worked on helping the teenagers escape from the occupied Netherlands to France and neutral Spain, hoping to be able to reach Israel by boat from there. Simon was arrested at the Dutch-Belgian border and committed suicide to not betray his comrades.
