= Westerweel Group =

Dutch Jewish resistance group

The Westerweel Group (Dutch: Westerweelgroep) was a small resistance group with non-Jewish and Jewish members that operated during the Nazi occupation of the Netherlands. Led by a Dutch Christian Joop Westerweel and Jewish German refugee Joachim Simon, the group was initiated in August 1942 and its first objective was to hide a Zionist Jewish youth group of "Israel pioneers" whose members were ordered to be deported to the Nazi Westerbork transit camp. They were primarily young Jews from Germany and Austria who had fled to the Netherlands after 1933 where they followed an agricultural training to settle in Palestine. When threatened with deportation, the resistance group helped them to find hiding places and some of them were brought to Spain via Belgium and France. 33 out of the 50 young Jewish pioneers group survived the war. The rest was deported after betrayal. Joop Westerveel was executed by the Nazis.

== Background ==
Around 450 Jewish teenage boys and girls were living in the Netherlands as refugees from Austria and Germany. They belonged to a Jewish youth organization called Hechalutz , meaning the pioneers in Hebrew. The goal of this movement, present across several European countries since its creation in the early 20th century, was to train these young Jews in agriculture, so that they could move to the Land of Israel. The teenagers were split into groups throughout the Netherlands, including one in Amsterdam and one in Loosdrecht, a village in North Holland. The group in Loosdrecht, which consisted of around 50 teenagers, worked on farms or with other agricultural related work in preparation for kibbutz-life in Israel.

The Westerveel group is named after Johan (Joop) Westerveel, a Dutch educator, convinced pacifist with a strong Christian background. In 1940, Joop Westerveel was the principal of a Montessori school in Rotterdam. With his wife, Wilhelmina, they had started helping Jewish refugees by taking them into their home. He was introduced to the Loodsrecht group of young Zionist Jewish pioneers by a former colleague, Mirjam Waterman. Westerveel formed a friendship with another member of the group, a young intellectual, "Shushu" Joachim Simon.

The initiative to form the Westerveel resistance group arose in August 1942 when the Nazis began ordering the deportation of Jews in the Netherlands and they started concentrating Jews in the Westerbork transit camp. From there, a first transport to Poland departed in mid-July. Part of this was a group of 22 underage German pioneers, who lived without family in the Netherlands in an Amsterdam boarding house. The Loosdrecht group, living together in an Aliyah center, chose to go into hiding instead of reporting for deportation. Of this group, some 50 pioneers between the ages of 15 and 19 stayed in the Pavilion, a former shelter for young people. They were in the same position as the Amsterdam group, but were accompanied by some older pioneers, who were determined not to let them be deported. They went looking for hiding places, but only found a few. On August 15, 1942 the Loodsrecht group got a warning from the Jewish Council that they were going to be deported. Joop Westerweel agreed to undertake the mission of finding hiding places for the entire group. They had to find and organize different addresses, forge identification cards and travel documents, raise money, and arrange ration cards. Westerweel Group then began also assisting Palestine Pioneers members located in Amsterdam.

The group then decided that it would be less dangerous for the escapees if they were smuggled outside of the Netherlands' borders. This was because their housing, which was temporary, required that they move frequently from one place to another, thus increasing the chances of being betrayed by locals or caught by the civilian police.

They first attempted to move eight teenagers to the neutral Switzerland, but they were caught by the Nazis. The group assumed they were betrayed by one of the people they asked for help, and they resolved to avoid using unknown outsiders.

Their second escape route, planned by Joachim Simon, was through Belgium to France and then to Spain over the Pyrenees mountain range.

== The Hiding Operation ==
Joop and his wife Wil Westerweel rejected any form of anti-Semitism imposed by the occupiers. They were involved in a protest against the dismissal of Jewish officials in the autumn of 1940 and helped a Jewish family to find a hiding place. But these were individual actions. They were not part of a resistance group. The request for help from Mirjam Waterman was therefore very welcome to Joop.

Together with a few (former) employees of the Kinderwerkplaats, especially the Frisian socialist and conscientious objector Bouke Koning and handyman Jan Smit, a Rotterdam carpenter, Joop immediately started looking for hiding addresses for the Loosdrecht. That went well. Bouke Koning found about a dozen of them with family and acquaintances in Friesland, Jan Smit ten with friends of the socialist youth movement AJC. Joop Westerweel provided addresses at acquaintances in Zutphen and in the left-wing movement.

After a tip of that the Germans would bring the Loosdrechts group to Westerbork in mid-August 1942, the hiding operation began. Stars were taken off the coats, the pioneers were given false papers and good advice on how to behave at their safe house. When the Germans arrived with a few trucks the Pavilion was empty. The escape operation was a success. But it was difficult to keep 50 people, some of whom were adolescents, in hiding. Some of the people who hid them had only promised shelter for a short period of time. Others were shocked by what is called the Jewish appearance of the pioneers and the fact that they sometimes barely spoke Dutch. Some pioneers could not stand the loneliness of an attic room or did not get along with the people who hid them. Moreover, more and more pioneers of other training courses who had heard of the successful Loosdrechts operation came forward. In short, new addresses were constantly needed and there were hardly any to find.

After a betrayed attempt to have people smugglers bring eight pioneers to Switzerland, in October 1942, the group decided to do everything as much as possible by themselves. The German pioneer Joachim Simon, one of the leaders in Loosdrecht, travelled to France to find an escape route. However, he soon found out that after the occupation of Vichy-France by Germany in November 1942 Switzerland was practically inaccessible. In consultation with the French pioneer movement, Simon chose Spain as a new destination. Arrangements for help were made and the first pioneers left on the dangerous escape route to France and from there to Spain. But this route quickly stalled. Simon was arrested at the Dutch-Belgian border in early 1943 and committed suicide so as not to betray his comrades. A Belgian people smuggler brought four pioneers to Spain, but was arrested in March 1943 with two pioneers in northern France.

Some relief came from a pastor in the province of Limburg, who helped in the hiding of some 25 pioneers. In Haarlem a new group was formed around the industrial designer and forger Frans Gerritsen. However an attempt to send pioneers with false papers to work in Germany as Dutch workers failed. Some of them were arrested and sent to Auschwitz.

In August 1943 Kurt Reilinger, a somewhat older pioneer, travelled to France to lead the escape work. He built a new route in which pioneers worked as workers of the Organisation Todt on the Atlantic Wall to flee to Spain from there. The latter was done in collaboration with the Armée Juive, a French Jewish resistance organization. In this way, in the course of 1943 and 1944, a total of about 70 pioneers escaped to Spain. Some of them had escaped Westerbork with the help of the Westerweel group shortly before. About 100 could hide in France and about the same number remained in hiding in the Netherlands.

== Infiltrations and Arrests ==
At the end of 1943, at the beginning of 1944, the Germans managed to infiltrate the Westerweel group and the Armée Juive separately. In the Netherlands, Wil Westerweel, among others, fell into the hands of the SD. Joop and Bouke Koning were arrested in March 1944 when they brought two pioneers across the Belgian border. In France, the SD picked up members of the top of the Armée Juive and 'journeyleader' Kurt Reilinger and eight of his pioneer assistants.

The Germans executed Joop Westerweel in August 1944 in the Vught Concentration Camp. Despite being tortured in the camp Joop became a spiritual leaders for the prisoners, with his untamable conviction in a better future. Wil and Bouke and several other members of the group, Jews and non-Jews, ended up in German concentration camps. Wil Westerweel was transported to Ravensbrück. The same fate affected the pioneers arrested in France. Some of them didn't survive the camps. However, Wil Westerweel was later allowed to go to Sweden as part of a prisoner exchange.The Westerweel group largely ceased operations in Autumn 1944. France, Belgium and the southern part of the Netherlands were liberated by then. Till the liberation of the rest of the Netherlands in May 1945 local resistance groups took care of the pioneers still in hiding. The Westerweel group managed to bring between 250 and 275 Palestine pioneers to safety. Another 30 Jews were helped to hiding places.

In 1964 Joop Westerveel and his wife Wil were recognized by Yad Vashem as Righteous Among the Nations.

== See also ==
- Dutch resistance
- Youth Aliyah
