= Julian Scriabin =

Russian composer (1908–1919)

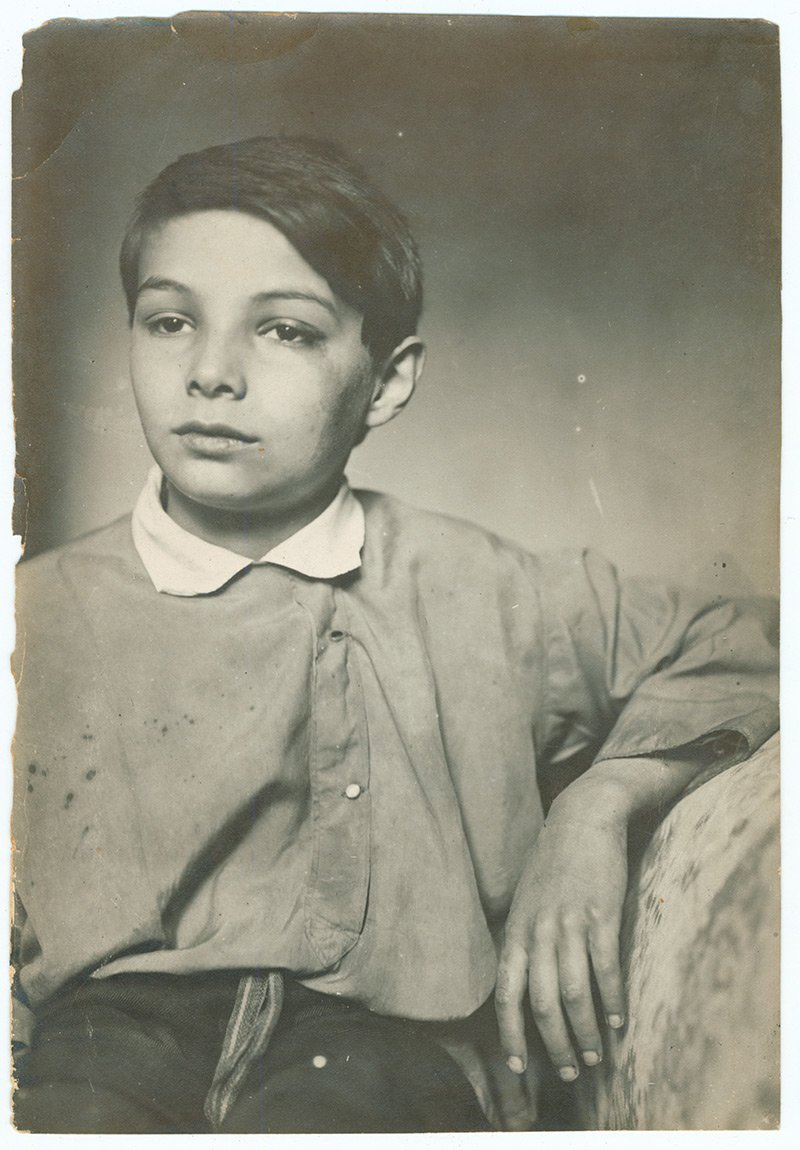
Scriabin in Kiev (1919)

Julian Alexandrovich Scriabin (né Schlözer; Russian: Юлиа́н Алекса́ндрович Скря́бин; 12 February 1908 – 22 June 1919) was a Swiss-born Russian composer and pianist who was the youngest son of Alexander Scriabin and Tatiana de Schloezer.

== Biography ==
Scriabin was born in Lausanne, Switzerland as Julian Alexandrovich Schlözer. Through his mother, his granduncle was Paul de Schlözer. His father Alexander Scriabin, famous for his innovative piano compositions, had seven children: Rima, Yelena, (Note: Later Yelena Aleksandrovna Sofronitskaya (1900–1990), also a pianist.) Maria (Note: Maria Aleskandrovna Skryabina (1901–1989), an actress at the Second Moscow Art Theatre, an anthroposophist and the wife of director Vladimir Tatarinov.) and Leo from his first marriage to Vera Ivanovna Isakovich; and Ariadna, Julian, and Marina from his relationship with Tatyana Fyodorovna Schloezer (Shlyotser). His eldest daughter Rima (1898–1905) and his son Leo (1902–1910) both died at the age of seven. By the time of the death of Leo, the composer had already been living for several years with Schloezer and had become estranged from his first family, so much so that the parents did not even meet at the burial of their son Lev (half brother of Julian).

He was himself a promising composer and pianist, but he died at the age of eleven under mysterious circumstances. In the last year of his life he wrote four preludes in his father's style, the authorship of which is questioned by some researchers. Those preludes were published for the first time 95 years after his death by Edition Octoechos. Musicologists have described Julian Scriabin both as a successor of his father and as an early representative of the early Russian and Soviet avant-garde of the 1920s.

Scriabin mysteriously died in Irpin in Kiev Governorate, four years after the death of his father. His body was found in the Dnieper river.

== Bibliography ==
- John Rodgers Four Preludes Ascribed to Yulian Skriabin // 19th-Century Music. — University of California Press, 1983. — Vol. 6. — № 3. — P. 213-219.
- Youthful and early works of Alexander and Julian Scriabin / Donald M. Garvelmann, Faubion Bowers. — Bronx: Music Treasure Publications, 1970. — 158 с.
- А. Н. Скрябин, под ред. А. В. Кашперова Письма. — М.: Музыка, 2003. — 719 с.
- Альшванг А. А. Несколько слов о Юлиане Скрябине // Александр Николаевич Скрябин. 1915–1940 : Сборник к 25-летию со дня смерти. — М.—Л.: Гос. муз. изд-во, 1940. — С. 241–242.
- Бандура А. И. Александр Скрябин. — Челябинск: Аркаим, 2004. — 384 с. — (Биографические ландшафты). — ISBN 5-8029-0510-7
- Баранова-Шестова Н.Л. Жизнь Льва Шестова. La vie de Léon Chestov : По переписке и воспоминаниям современников. — Paris, 1983. — 395 с. — ISBN 978-2-904228-09-4
- Дукельский В. А. Об одной прерванной дружбе // Мосты. Литературно-художественный и общественно-политический альманах. — США, 1968. — Т. 13–14. — С. 254.
- Лемэр Ф.Ш. Музыка XX века в России и в республиках бывшего Советского Союза. — Спб.: Гиперион, 2003. — С. 30. — 528 с.
- Маркус С. А. Юлиан Скрябин. Прелюдии Op.3 №1 и 2. // Александр Николаевич Скрябин. 1915–1940 : Сборник к 25-летию со дня смерти. — М.—Л.: Гос. муз. изд-во, 1940. — С. 243.
- Масловская Т. Ю. О судьбе потомков А. Н. Скрябина // А. Н. Скрябин в пространствах культуры ХХ века. — М.: Композитор, 2009. — С. 174—179. — ISBN 5-85285-313-5.
- Сабанеев Л. Л. Воспоминания о Скрябине. — М.: Классика-XXI, 2000. — 400 с. — ISBN 5-89817-011-1
- Скрябин А. С. Трагедия и подвиг Т. Ф. Шлёцер // А. Н. Скрябин в пространствах культуры ХХ века. — М.: Композитор, 2009. — С. 170–174. — ISBN 5-85285-313-5.
- Слонимский Н. Л. Абсолютный слух. История жизни. — С-Пб.: Композитор, 2006. — С. 79. — 424 с. — ISBN 5-7379-0305-2
- Томпакова О. М. Бесподобное дитя века. Ариадна Скрябина. — М.: Музыка, 1998. — 32 с. — ISBN 5-7140-0663-1
- Тропп В. В. Скрябин и Гнесины // А. Н. Скрябин в пространствах культуры ХХ века. — М.: Композитор, 2009. — С. 109—113. — ISBN 5-85285-313-5.
- Федякин С. Р. Скрябин. — М.: Молодая гвардия, 2004. — 258 с. — (ЖЗЛ). — ISBN 5-235-02582-2
- Хазан В. И. Моим дыханьем мир мой жив (К реконструкции биографии Ариадны Скрябиной) // Особенный еврейско-русский воздух: к проблематике и поэтике русско-еврейского литературного диалога в XX веке. — Иерусалим; М.: Гешарим: Мосты культуры, 2001. — С. 239—261. — 430 с. — (Прошлый век). — ISBN 5-93273-065-X
- Ханон Ю. Скрябин как лицо. — СПб.: Центр Средней Музыки & Лики России, 1995. — 680 с.
- Шеховцова И. П. Экзаменационные ведомости в фондах Музея-квартиры Ел. Ф. Гнесиной // Гнесинский исторический сборник. — М., 2004. — С. 134–144.
- Шлёцер Б. Ф. А. Скрябин. Личность. Мистерия. — Берлин: Грани, 1923. — Т. 1.
- Энгель Ю. Д. Глазами современника. — М.: Музыка, 1971. — 522 с.
- Летопись жизни и творчества А. Н. Скрябина / Прянишникова М.П., Томпакова О.М.. — М.: Музыка, 1985. — 296 с.
