= Dovid Knut =

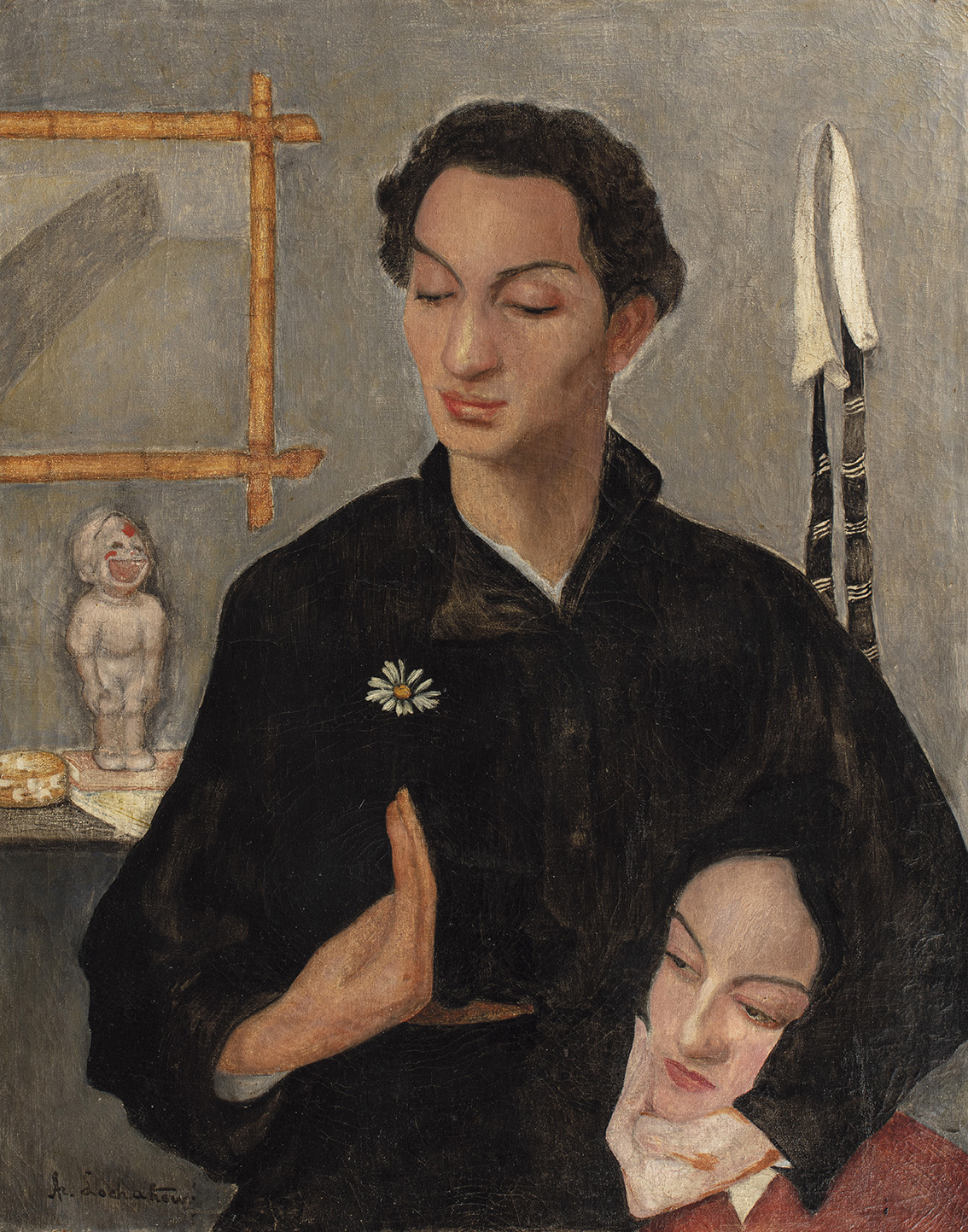
- Born: September 10, 1900
- Died: February 15, 1955; Tel Aviv

Dovid Knut or Knout (Russian: До́вид Кнут) (23 September [O.S. 10 September] 1900–15 February 1955), real name Duvid Meerovich (later David Mironovich) Fiksman (Russian: Ду́вид Ме́ерович [Дави́д Миро́нович] Фи́ксман), was a Jewish poet and member of the French Resistance.

== Biography ==
Fiksman was born in the Bessarabian town of Orgeev in the Russian Empire (now Orhei, Moldova), the eldest son of the grocer Meer Fiksman and his wife Haya. His early years were spent in Chișinău, where his parents had moved by early 1903. There he studied in a cheder and a state school for Jews. At fourteen he began publishing poetry in local periodicals, and in 1918 he edited the magazine Molodaya mysl' [Young thought], taking the pen name Dovid Knut, perhaps from the word knut, meaning 'whip, lash', used in both Russian and Yiddish as a symbol of oppression and slavery.

In 1920, when Bessarabia became part of Romania, the family moved to Paris, where Dovid had factory and other jobs during the day and studied French at the night school of the Alliance française, opened his own eatery in the Latin Quarter, studied in the Department of Chemistry of the University of Caen in Normandy, and worked as an engineer. He also took part in the cultural life of emigre Paris, helping to organize the "Exhibition of Thirteen" in July 1922, joining the Union of Young Poets and Writers, and coediting the magazine Novy dom [New home]. He contributed poems to many émigré publications, and his first collection, Moikh tysyachiletii [My millennia], appeared in 1925 and was "well received for its Biblical intonation and verbal vibrancy"; his second, published in 1928, was reviewed sympathetically by Vladimir Nabokov, who praised its "energetic verses" but complained about lapses of taste.

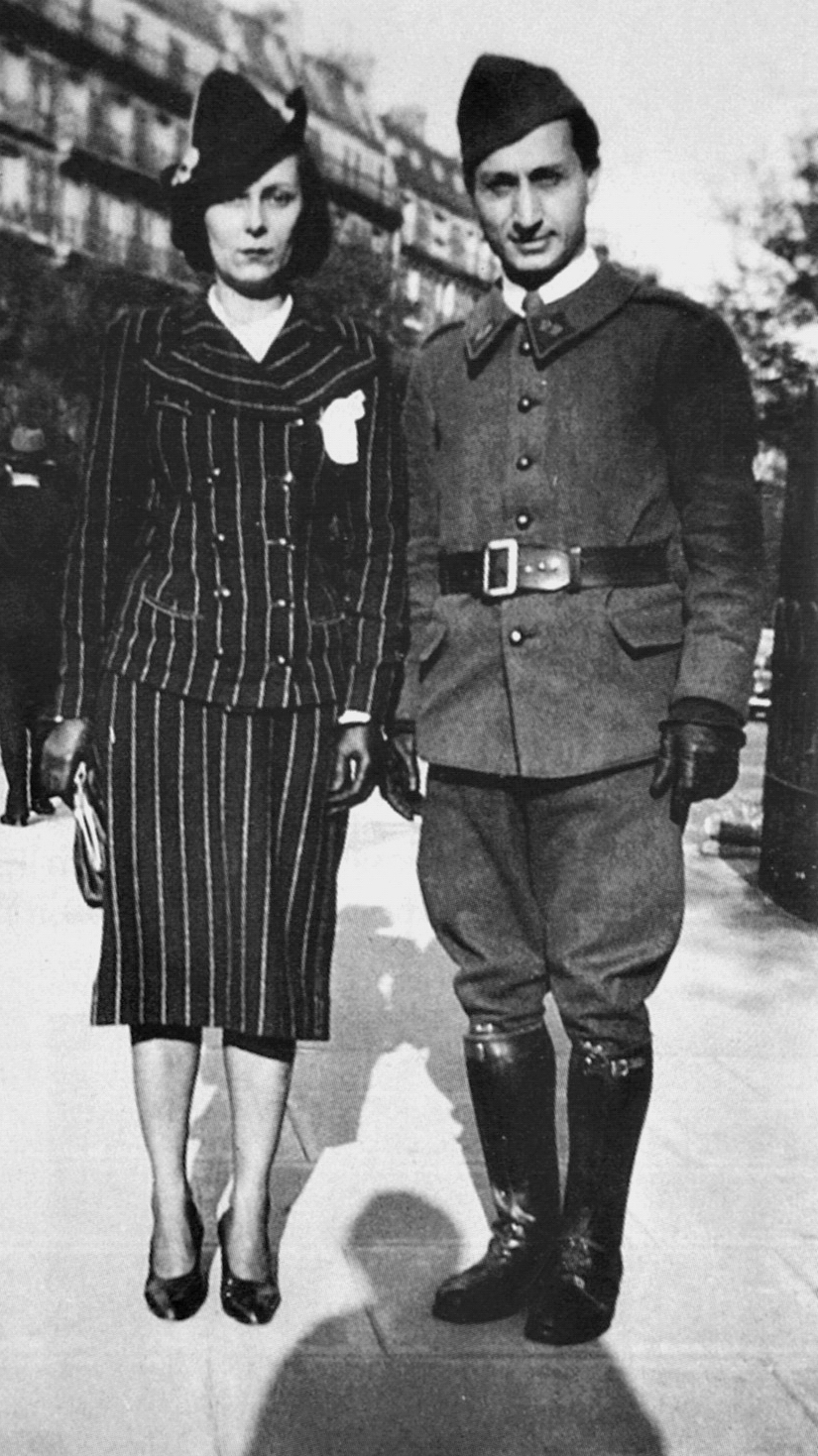
Dovid Knut and Ariadna، Paris، 1939

In the early 1930s, Knut separated from his first wife, Sarra Groboys, the mother of his son Daniel, and became close to Ariadna (Ariane) Scriabine (1906–1944, known as "Régine" in the Resistance), the daughter of the Russian composer Alexander Scriabin. At the same time he was becoming increasingly involved with Jewish activism, and he and Ariadna visited Palestine from August to December 1937; while he was there, Haaretz published one of his poems in Hebrew translation. He edited the Jewish newspaper L'Affirmation from January 1938 to September 1939, attacking writers and intellectuals who showed sympathy for anti-Semitism. In September 1939 he was mobilized into the French army. Ariadna had become passionately devoted to the Jewish cause; they were married in March 1940 and she converted to Judaism at that time. The next month they moved to Toulouse, where along with others they established a secret organization called La main forte [The strong hand], which became the Armée juive (AJ or Jewish Army), a World War II resistance movement. In December 1942, pursued by the Gestapo, Knut escaped to Switzerland; Ariadna gave birth to his son Yosi in May 1943. She was ambushed and killed by members of the French Militia while holding an AJ meeting at her flat in Toulouse in July 1944, two weeks before the city was liberated.

Knut returned to Paris in the fall of 1944, working at the Centre de documentation juive contemporaine. In 1946 he became editor of the magazine Le Monde juif [Jewish world], and the next year he married actress Virginia Sharovskaya (who became Leah Fiksman). In 1949 he published a substantial volume of selected poems; that same year he and his family left France and moved to Israel. He lived in Tel Aviv and taught Hebrew at an ulpan in Kiryat Motzkin. He died in 1955 from cancer of the brain.

== Poetry collections ==
- Moikh tysyachiletii [My millennia]. Paris: Ptitselov, 1925 (text; pdf).
- Vtoraya kniga stikhov [Second book of poems]. Paris: Navarre, 1928 (text; pdf).
- Satir [Satyr]. Paris: Monastyr' muz, 1929.
- Parizhskie nochi [Paris nights]. Paris: Rodnik, 1932.
- Nasushchnaya lyubov' [Urgent love]. Paris: Dom knigi, 1938.
- Izbrannye stikhi [Selected poems]. Paris: Moderne de la Presse, 1949.
