= Joop Westerweel =

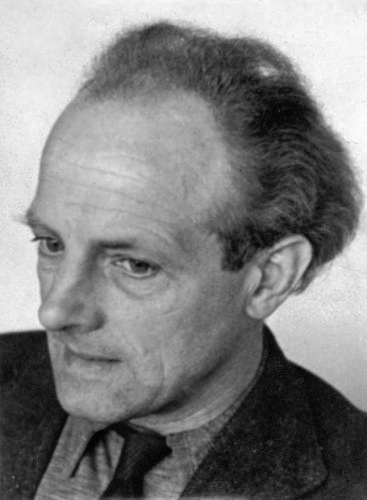
Joop Westerweel

Joop Westerweel (25 January 1899, Zutphen – 11 August 1944, Vught) was a schoolteacher, a non-conformist socialist and a Christian anarchist who became a Dutch World War II resistance leader, the head of the Westerweel Group.

Westerweel, along with Joachim Simon and other Jewish colleagues, helped save around 200 to 300 Jews by organizing an escape route, smuggling Jews through Belgium, France and on into neutral Switzerland and Spain. He was arrested on 10 March 1944, after leading a group of Jewish children to safety in Spain, whilst on his way back to the Netherlands at the Dutch/Belgian border. He was executed at Herzogenbusch concentration camp in August 1944.

== Life ==
Johan Gerard (Joop) Westerweel was a humanist and convinced pacifist, influenced by his parents who belonged to a non-consensual sect of Protestantism, the Derbists. His background in education and his idealism inspired him to set up the non-violent resistant group that helped save Jewish refugees from the Nazis in occupied Holland. In 1940 Joop Westweel and his wife, Wil, moved to Rotterdam where Joop became the Principal of a Montessori school. They had 4 children and started helping Jewish refugees from Germany by taking them in their home. Joop Westerweel then met via a former colleague a group of young Jewish "pioneers' who trained in agriculture in the Netherlands in preparation for emigrating to Israel. In August 1942, when these teenagers became threatened with being deported, Joop Westerweel and "Shushu" Joachim Simon from the pioneers' group created the Westerweel resistance group to find hiding places for the young Jewish refugees. They then worked on helping them escape to France and the neutral Spain. Joop Westerweel was arrested with his co-worker in the resistance group, Bouke Koning, at the Dutch-Belgian border when helping escorting two Jewish young women. He was tortured and executed in the Vught concentration camp. Wil Westerweel had been arrested earlier when trying to help a young Jewish "halutz", Lettie Rudelsheim, escape from prison. Wil Westerweel was also emprisoned in the Vught camp, where she witnessed the execution of her husband, and then transferred to the Ravensbruck concentration camp. She was later freed and came back to the Netherlands.

== Legacy ==
The Joop Westerweel Park in Israel was named in memory of Westerweel. Several streets in the Netherlands are named after Westerweel, in Heemskerk, Montfoort, Rotterdam, and Vlaardingen. In Amsterdam, a public primary school is named after Westerweel. Along with his wife, in 1964 Joop received the Yad-Vashem award.

== Family ==
The Dutch television presenter Bas Westerweel is Joop Westerweel's grandchild.

== See also ==
- Anarchism in the Netherlands
- Wieke Bosch, another Dutch anarchist who saved people from the Holocaust and was executed by the Nazis
