= Maurice Loebenberg =

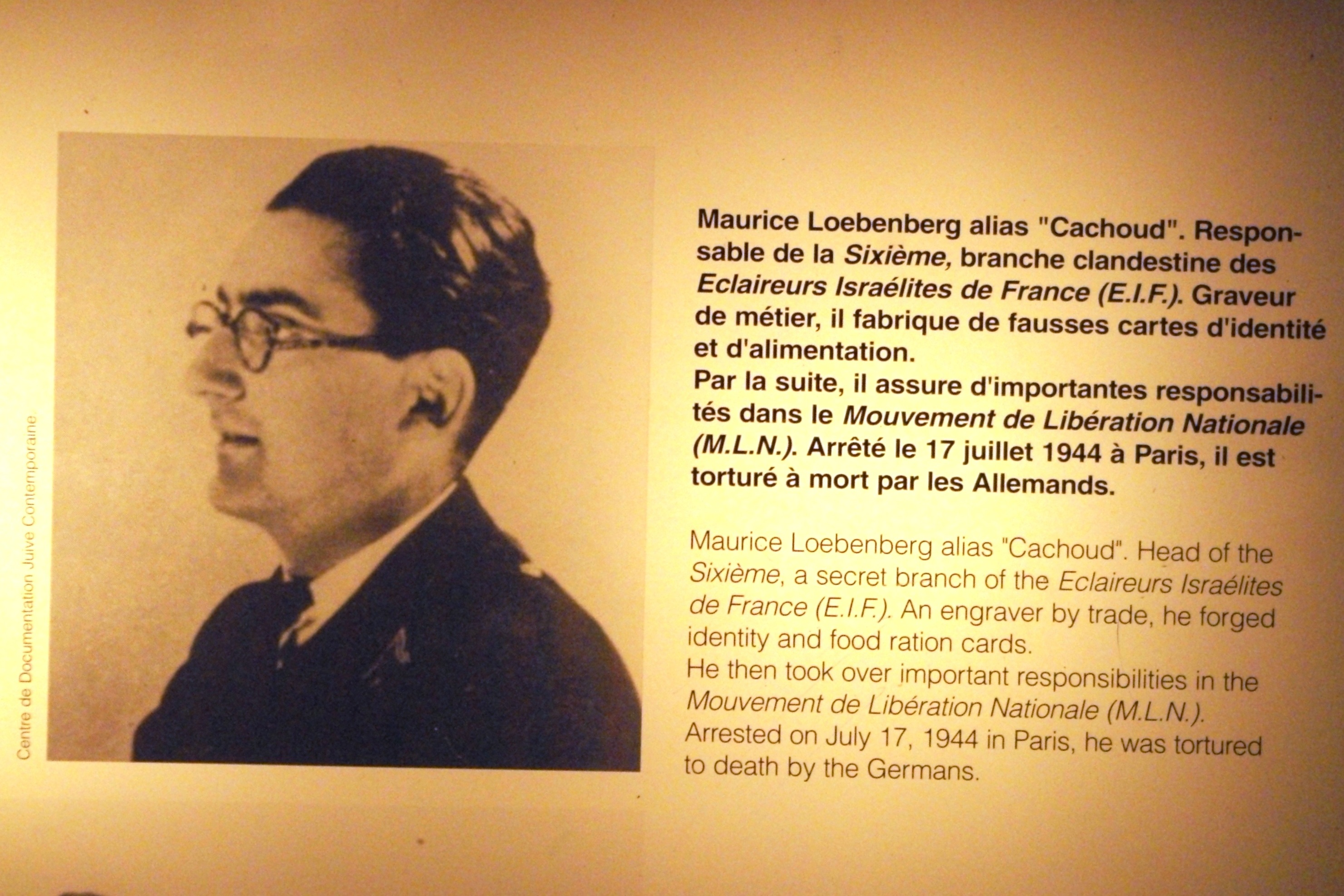
Maurice Loebenberg

Maurice Loebenberg, known by the nom de guerre of Maurice Cachoud (Zurich, June 29, 1916 - July 20, 1944 Paris; arrested 18 July 1944 and tortured to death) was a Jewish member of the French Resistance during World War II. He founded a group that specialized in forging official papers for use by resistance fighters and escaping Jews.

== Biography ==
Loebenberg was an engraver. He joined the resistance in 1940 and was responsible for circulating the clandestine newspaper Combat in the Marseille region in 1941. Starting in May 1943, and especially after the Germans occupied the region around Nice, previously occupied by the Italians.

Assisted by Raymond Heymann, Loebenberg put to use his skills as an engraver and began creating false papers on a large scale. He made contact with the Armée juive (Jewish Army) and formed the Maurice Cachoud group (after his nom de guerre). The group procured thousands of stamps from official French or German papers to help it create convincing forgeries. It created identity cards, birth certificates, marriage certificates, and ration cards, which it distributed to Jews in hiding and to members of the resistance and Maquisards.

Author Pierre Piazza describes Loebenberg's work as a forger: “In 1944, the sophistication of this forgery service was such that it made packets of false papers intended to feed factories, groups of deserters, and Jews in hiding. As complete as they were varied, and easy to use (explanatory notes were attached), these packets from the perfect forger were almost small field laboratories.”

Loebenberg's group produced an estimated 20,000 or more identity cards from September 1943 to March 1944. It also organized the flight of young people to French colonies, where they could enlist in the Free French Forces. Finally, it hunted down and executed French people who denounced their countrymen to the Germans.

In May 1944, Loebenberg was called to Paris, where he was to centralize the forgery service of the National Liberation Movement. Raymond Heymann took over his position in Nice. While he was in Paris, Jewish resistance leaders made contact with a man who claimed to be a representative of MI6. In fact, this was Karl Rehbein, a German agent responsible for the massacre of young members of the resistance who were shot in the Bois de Boulogne. Rehbein had Loebenberg arrested on July 17, 1944, with other members of the Organisation Juive de Combat (a name used at this time by the Armée juive). Loebenberg was turned over to the French Gestapo, and tortured to death at 180 Rue de la Pompe in Paris. His body was found in a bush in the Verrières woods outside of Paris. He was buried in the Montparnasse Cemetery on April 10, 1945, with military honors.

== Bibliography ==
- (fr) Marc Fineltin, "Maurice Loebenberg", on "Mémoire et espoirs de la Résistance"
- (fr) David Diamant, 250 combattants de la Résistance témoignent, L'Harmattan, 1991 (ISBN 2-7384-0691-2) pages 257-259
- (fr) Pierre Piazza, Histoire de la carte nationale d'identité, éditions Odile Jacob, 2004 (ISBN 2-7381-1406-7)
- Susan Zuccotti, The Holocaust, the French, and the Jews, Harper Collins, 1999 (ISBN 0-8032-9914-1)
