= Jacques Lazarus =

Jacques Lazarus (September 2, 1916 in Payerne, Switzerland – January 7, 2014 in Paris, France) was a French military officer who was a leader of the Jewish resistance in France during World War II.

== Biography ==
Lazarus was a career officer forced out of the military by the Vichy laws on the status of Jews, a series of antisemitic laws passed by the Vichy government in 1940–1941. He joined the Armée juive (Jewish Army), a Jewish resistance group that later became the Organisation Juive de Combat (Jewish Combat Organization). At first, he instructed youth in the region of Grenoble in basic military skills. Then, he was charged with overseeing autonomous Armée juive maquis guerillas in the Tarn department.

Following a betrayal of the resistance by Karl Rehbein (who also was responsible for the shooting of young resistance fighters in the Bois de Boulogne), Lazarus was arrested by the French Gestapo. He was sent to the Drancy internment camp near Paris. The SS officer who ran the camp, Alois Brunner, sent him and other members of the Organisation Juive de Combat aboard the last train to leave the camp for Auschwitz on August 17, 1944. Twenty-seven of the prisoners, including Lazarus, escaped by jumping from the train.

After the war, Lazarus established himself in Algiers, where he became the director of the World Jewish Congress for Africa and where he founded the periodical Information Juive (Jewish Information). After Algeria became independent in 1962, he relocated to Paris and continued publishing Information Juive.
