= Armée Juive =

WWII resistance movement

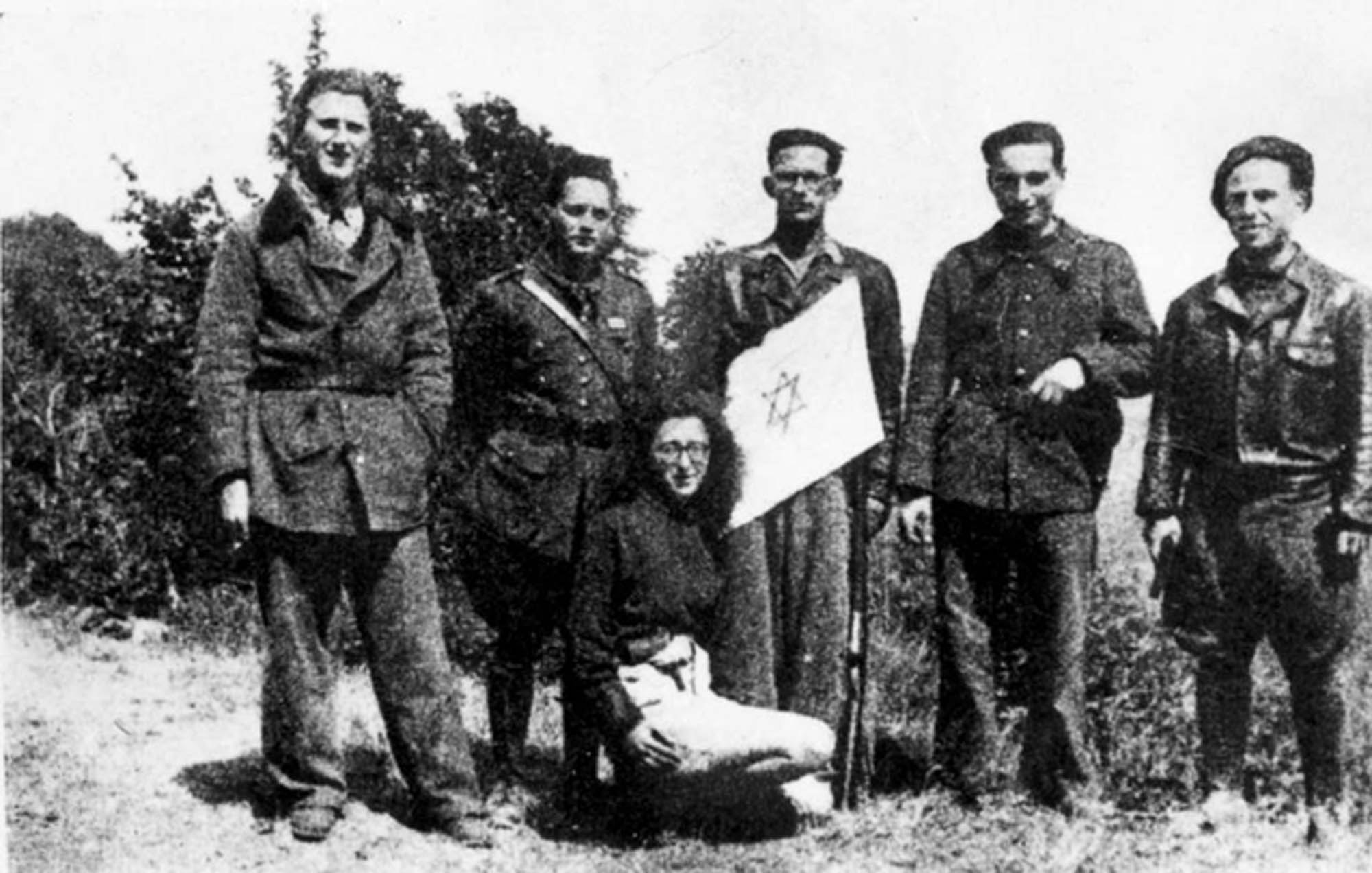
Maquisards of the Armée Juive at Espinasse (Puy-de-Dôme, France)

The Armée Juive (Jewish Army), was a Zionist resistance movement in Nazi occupied Vichy France during World War II which was created during January 1942 in Toulouse. It was established and led by Abraham Polonski and his wife Eugénie, the socialist Lucien Lublin, Russian poet David Knout, and his wife Ariadna Scriabina (daughter of the Russian composer Alexander Scriabin).

Armée Juive was originally called the Mouvement des Jeunesses Sionistes (M.J.S.). Its intention was to protect threatened Jews and take their fighting skills back to Palestine to help create a Jewish State there. At its height, it had over 2,000 members and was primarily concerned with helping Jews escape to Spain via the Pyrenees although it also conducted attacks and sabotage operations.

The first members of the AJ were recruited from a Torah study group headed by Rabbi Paul Roitman (1920). They included Arnold Mandel, Elie Rothnemer, Claude Strauss (writer Claude Vigée) and Maurice Hausner. They received funds to finance their activities from Marc Jarblum, the socialist president of the refugee Zionist Organization of France which operated from Switzerland.

The Army became the Organisation Juive de Combat and was officially registered under the French Forces of the Interior (FFI).

Placing my right hand on the blue and white flag,

I swear fidelity to the Jewish Army
And obedience to its leaders.
May my people live again,
May Eretz-Israel be reborn.

Liberty or death. - the oath of the Armée Juive.

== Notable members ==
- Frida Wattenberg (1924–2020)
- Jacques Lazarus
- Maurice Loebenberg
- Georges Loinger
- Arnold Mandel
- Marcel Marceau (1923-2007)
- René Polski
- Ernest Lambert (1897–1931)
