= Boris de Schlözer =

Russian translator (1881–1969)

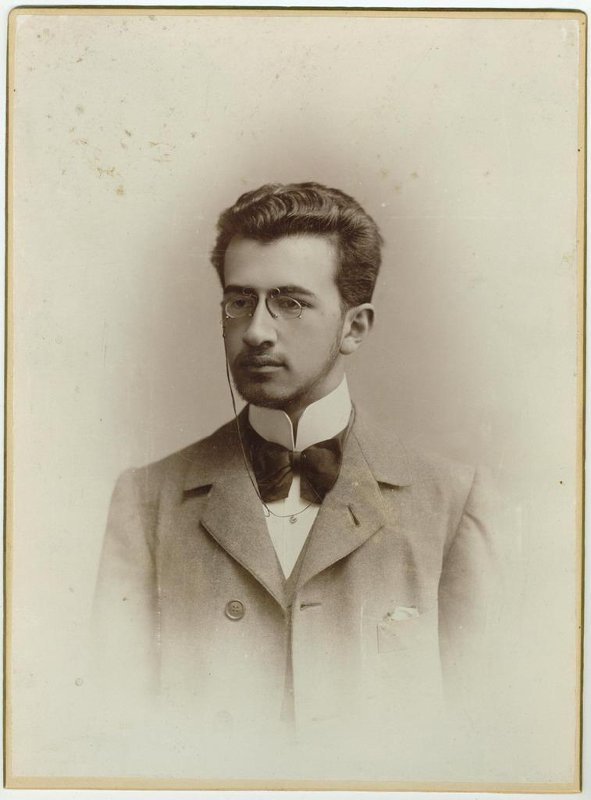
Boris de Schlözer in 1902

Boris Fyodorovich Schlözer (Schloezer) (Russian: Борис Фёдорович Шлёцер; sometimes transliterated as Boris Fëdorovič Šlëcer or Boris de Šlëcer; 8 December 1881, Vitebsk – 7 October 1969, Paris) was a writer, musicologist and French translator of Russian origin.

== Life and career ==
A descendant of the Russian branch of a German noble family, (Note: His father, Nestor Karl von Schlözer [1839–1906], was a senior officer of the Russian Empire) he emigrated to France after the October Revolution. He took part in the Nouvelle Revue Française and translated many Russian authors, among them Gogol, Dostoevsky, Rozanov, Tolsoy, and especially his friend Lev Shestov, whom he helped to diffuse his philosophy in France. Passionate about music, he wrote monographs on composers, sometimes in collaboration with his niece Marina Scriabina and his sister Tatiana Schlözer (1883–1922), who was Marina's mother and the mistress of Alexander Scriabin.

Schloezer's Introduction à J.-S. Bach outlines a phenomenological approach to music, and is in agreement with contemporary gestalt music theories. He wrote prolifically on Stravinsky, including one of the first biographies of the composer. Schloezer's writings were influential for Boulez and his generation, though Schloezer occasionally criticized Boulez, for example in his 1955 article "Retour à Descartes."

== Works ==
- Igor Stravinsky (1929)
- Gogol (1932)
- Introduction à J.-S. Bach; essai d'esthétique musicale (1947)
- "Retour à Descartes" (1955)
- Problèmes de la musique moderne [with Marina Scriabine, his niece] (1959)
- Mon nom est personne, roman (1969)
- Alexandre Scriabin (1975)

Translations from Russian to French

- Dostoïevski et la lutte contre les évidences de Léon Chestov (1922)
- La Confession de Stavroguine de Dostoïevski (1922)
- La Guerre et la Paix de Tolstoï
- Le Diable de Tolstoï
