= Abraham Polonski =

French resistance member (born 1903)

- Born: 1903; Slonim, Belarus, Russian Empire
- Died: unknown
- Other names: Pol
- Occupation: Electrical engineer
- Known for: One of the founders of the French Jewish Resistance movement

Abraham Polonski (1903 – unknown), also known as Pol or Maurice Ferrer, was a Belarusian electrical engineer in Toulouse who was one of the founders of the French Jewish Resistance movement.

By June 1940, the French army had surrendered to Germany. Polonski and others established an underground organization called La Main Forte, meaning "The Strong Hand".

By 1942, Polonski and Labor Movement Zionist activists also established the Armee Juive (AJ), or Jewish Army, which was a commando force composed of the Zionist youth movement members. During 1943–1944, the Jewish Army helped some hundreds of its members to successfully escape to Spain and then Palestine. The group fought in Toulouse, Nice, Lyon, and Paris areas, attacking informers who had collaborated with the Gestapo and helped liberate France in the summer of 1944.

They were funded to the sum of tens of millions of francs by the Jewish Agency and from the American Jewish Joint Distribution Committee.

Polonski went on to become a Haganah commander of the AJ in France and North Africa.

== Sources ==
- Abraham Polonski and the Jewish resistance in France during the Second World War. Yehuda Ben-David, Yaʻel Zaidman, Miśrad ha-bitaḥon, 2002
- Tsilla Hershco, Those who Walk in Darkness will See the Light, the Jewish Resistance in France During the Holocaust and the Creation of Israel: 1940-1949 (Hebrew, 2003, 2018).
