= William Churchill =

William Churchill may refer to:

- William Churchill (burgess)(1649–1710) British attorney who became merchant, burgess and planter in the Virginia colony, great-grandfather of 9th president of USA William Henry Harrison
- William Churchill (Dorchester MP) (1627–1702), MP for Dorchester 1685–1689
- William Churchill (Ipswich MP) (1661–1737), MP for Ipswich 1707–1714 and 1715–1717
- William Churchill (ethnologist) (1859–1920), American Polynesian ethnologist and philologist
- William Churchill (athlete) (1885–1969), American long-distance runner
- Bill Churchill (1904–1959), Australian rules footballer
- William Algernon Churchill (1865–1947), art historian and British diplomat
- William Nosworthy Churchill (1796–1846), British-born journalist in Turkey
- William Sydney Churchill (1860–1918), British military officer
