= Violet Myers =

Classical singer (1875–1943)

- Born: Hannah Violet Myers; 11 May 1875; Birmingham, England
- Died: 15 September 1943 (aged 68)
- Education: Girton College, Cambridge (MA)
- Occupation: Singer
- Spouse: William Algernon Churchill (m. 1906)
- Children: 4, including Walter, Peter, and Oliver
- Relatives: Walter Myers (brother); Stella Churchill (sister)

Hannah Violet Myers (11 May 1875 – 15 September 1943) was a British classical singer and the wife of art historian and diplomat William Algernon Churchill.

== Early life ==
Hannah Violet Myers was born on 11 May 1875 in Birmingham, the oldest daughter of George Myers (b.1841) and Flora Wertheimer (1851–1921), granddaughter of Chief Rabbi Akiba Wertheimer and niece of German philosopher Constantin Brunner.

Her brother Walter was a distinguished physician and bacteriologist, and her younger sister Stella was a noted psychologist and psychotherapist.

== Education ==
Myers went to King Edward's School, Birmingham, and Edgbaston High School, and then in 1893 to Girton College, Cambridge where she read Mediaeval and Modern Languages, matriculating in 1896 and receiving an MA in 1928.

== Career ==
After graduating from university in 1898 she studied singing in London, Brussels, and Paris, and until her marriage in 1906 she gave recitals and also acted, including at the New Court Theatre (now known as the Royal Court Theatre), London. She performed classical concerts around the UK during the early 20th century and was described as "possessed of a beautiful soprano voice".

On 26 October 1906 she married British diplomat William Algernon Churchill, and accompanied him on his postings as British Consul in Amsterdam in 1906, Stockholm in 1913, Milan in 1919, Palermo in 1928 and finally Algiers in 1934.

She had four children: Walter (1907–1943), Peter (1909–1972), Flora (1911–1929), and Oliver (1914–1997). Her three sons served in the British Armed Forces during World War II – Walter becoming an ace during the Battle of Britain while Peter and Oliver each served in the Special Operations Executive – and all three were highly decorated, each being awarded the Distinguished Service Order and also a second high level medal of gallantry.

After her husband's retirement in about 1935 they lived in Malvern, Worcestershire, where from 1937 she was Secretary of Malvern Branch of the National Council of Women and from 1939 Secretary of the Refugee Committee until her death on 15 September 1943, aged 68.

Her sister Stella married her husband's brother Sidney, who was also a British diplomat.
