= Stella Churchill =

British psychologist (1883–1954)

Stella Churchill FRCS LRCP
- Stella Churchill in 1924, aged 41
- Born: Stella Myers; 5 June 1883; Edgbaston, Birmingham
- Died: 16 September 1954 (aged 71); Menton, France
- Education: Girton College Cambridge, London School of Medicine for Women
- Occupations: psychologist, psychotherapist
- Spouse: Sidney Churchill
- Children: George, Ruth
- Parents: George Myers (b. 1841) (father); Flora Wertheimer (1851–1921) (mother)

Stella Churchill FRCS LRCP (5 June 1883 – September 16, 1954), was a British medical psychologist and psychotherapist who specialised in the health of women and children.

== Early life ==
She was born Stella Myers on 5 June 1883 in Edgbaston, Birmingham, the daughter of George Myers (b. 1841) and Flora Wertheimer (1851–1921). She was the great-granddaughter of Chief Rabbi Akiba Wertheimer, and great niece of German philosopher Constantin Brunner. Her brother Walter was an eminent physician and parasitologist, and her sister Violet was a classical singer.

She married British diplomat Sidney Churchill on 31 October 1908 from whom she later separated. They had a son, George (b. 1910), and a daughter, Ruth Isabella (1912–1998), Her sister Violet married William Algernon Churchill, one of her husband's brothers.

== Education ==
After Edgbaston High School she went to Girton College Cambridge to read Natural Science, graduating in 1905. Following her marriage in 1908 she went on to read medicine at the London School of Medicine for Women. She obtained a Diploma in Public Health in Cambridge in 1921.

== Career ==
After qualifying as a doctor in 1917 she held junior posts at the Hospital for Sick Children, Great Ormond Street, the Victoria Hospital for Children, and the Italian Hospital, before being appointed anaesthetist to the British Red Cross Hospital at Netley in 1918. She was Assistant Medical Officer for Health for Maternity and Child Welfare at Bermondsey from 1920 to 1922, and First Assistant then Deputy Medical Officer for Health for St Pancras from 1922 to 1924.

She was a Fellow of the Maternity and Child Welfare Group of the Society of Medical Officers of Health and served as its president. She was a keen supporter of the Save the Children Fund and served on its council.

She retired from public health service and became interested in medical psychology and was appointed psychotherapist to the Tavistock Clinic and the West End Hospital for Nervous Diseases.

Churchill took a strong interest in infertility, sexually transmitted diseases, and eugenics and was a member of the Eugenics Society serving on its committee from 1931.

She lived at Strand Green House, No 1 Strand-on-the-Green, Chiswick, from about 1923–32 where her houseguests included the writer 'Elizabeth' Mary Beauchamp, author Margaret Kennedy who used Strand Green House in her book The Constant Nymph, and sculptor Joseph Armitage. She opened the first local child welfare clinic at Strand on the Green School.

She wrote many books on maternity and child welfare.

== Public life ==
From 1925 to 1932 she represented South East Southwark on the London County Council. She was parliamentary Labour candidate for Hackney North in 1924 and for Brentford and Chiswick in 1929.

== Death ==
She died on 16 September 1954 in Menton, France, aged 71.

== Bibliography ==
- Nursing in the Home, including first aid in common emergencies, Modern Health Books, 1925
- The Hygiene Of Life And Safer Motherhood, Edited by Sir W Arbuthnot Lane, plus Sir William Willcox, Sir R Armstrong-Jones, Sir B Bruce-Porter; Dr E Sloan Chesser; Dr Stella Churchill; Dr Caleb W Saleeby; et al. 1925
- Health Services and the Public, Noel Douglas, London, 1928
- On being a mother, Gollancz 1936
- The Adolescent and the Family, London, The Cresset Press, 1949
- Ailments of Childhood - A Vintage Article on Appendicitis, Colds, Fevers, Tuberculosis and Other Childhood Ailments, Hughes Press
