= Walter Myers (physician) =

British pathologist (1872 - 1901)

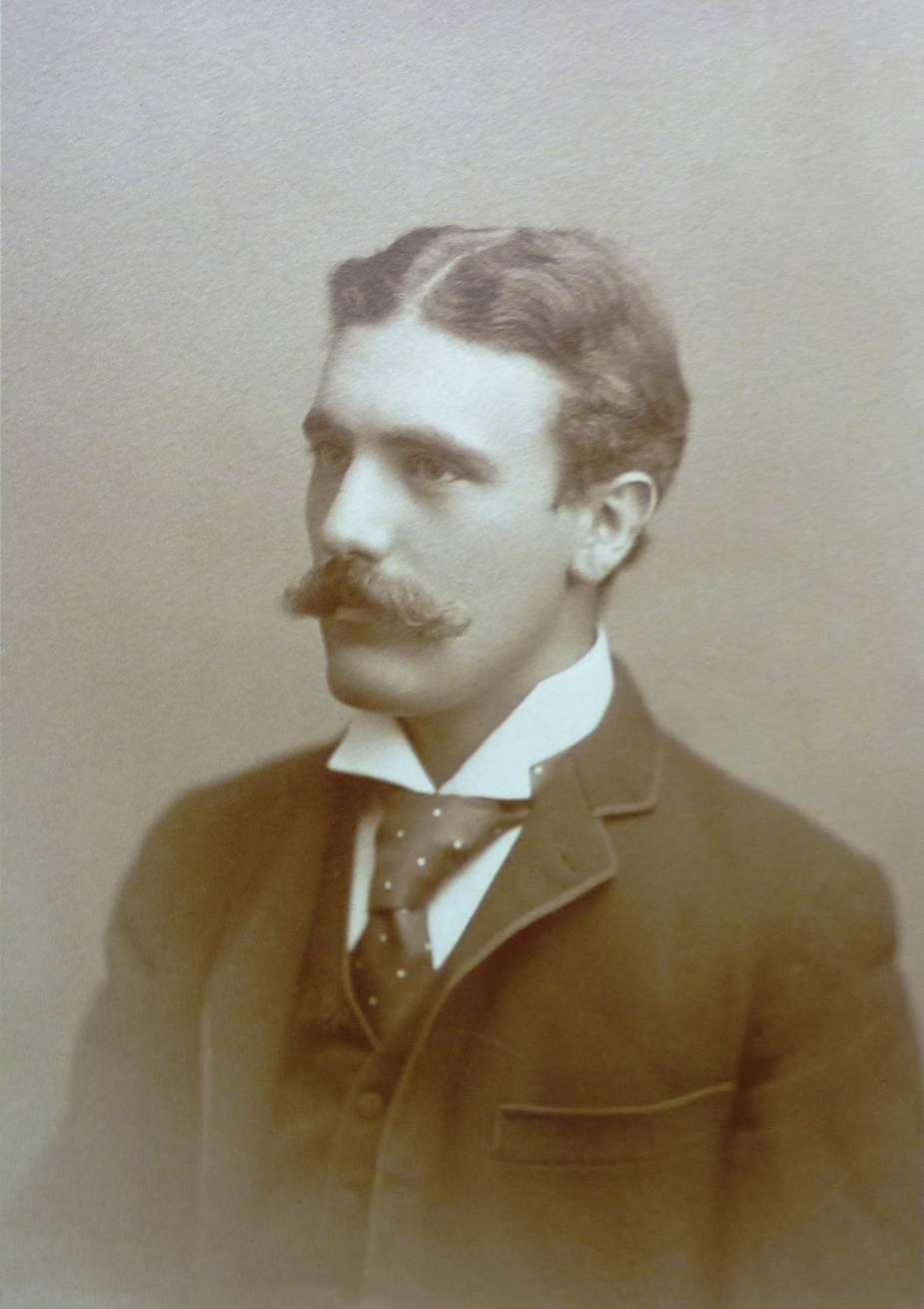
- Myers, c. 1895
- Born: 28 March 1872; Edgbaston, Birmingham, UK
- Died: 20 January 1901 (aged 28); Pará, Brazil
- Resting place: Pará, Brazil
- Education: Birmingham University, University of Cambridge, London University, St Thomas' Hospital
- Scientific career
- Fields: Immunology, toxicology, parasitology
- Workplaces: University of Cambridge

Walter Myers BSc, MA, MB BChir, MRCS, LRCP (28 March 1872 – 20 January 1901) was a British physician, toxicologist and parasitologist who died of yellow fever aged 28 while studying the disease in Brazil.

== Early life ==
Walter Myers was born on 28 March 1872 in Edgbaston, the only son of George Myers (b.1841) and Flora Wertheimer (1851–1921) granddaughter of Chief Rabbi Akiba Wertheimer and niece of German philosopher Constantin Brunner. His older sister Violet was a classical singer and younger sister Stella was a noted psychologist and psychotherapist. His firstborn nephew, Walter Myers Churchill (b.1907 d.1942), was named in his memory.

== Education ==
Myers went to King Edward's High School, Birmingham, as a Foundation Scholar.

In 1889 he left the High School with a Natural Science Scholarship, tenable for three years in Mason's College, Birmingham (now Birmingham University), where he studied in the biological laboratory while preparing for the Intermediate BSc. Examination (London), and won the Senior Botanical Prize. In 1890, relinquishing this scholarship, he then went to Gonville and Caius College, Cambridge, where he gained an open Natural Science Scholarship and received a First in Part I. At the same time he studied science at London University.

He then became a medical student at St Thomas' Hospital, London, graduating in medicine at Cambridge University in 1897.

== Career ==
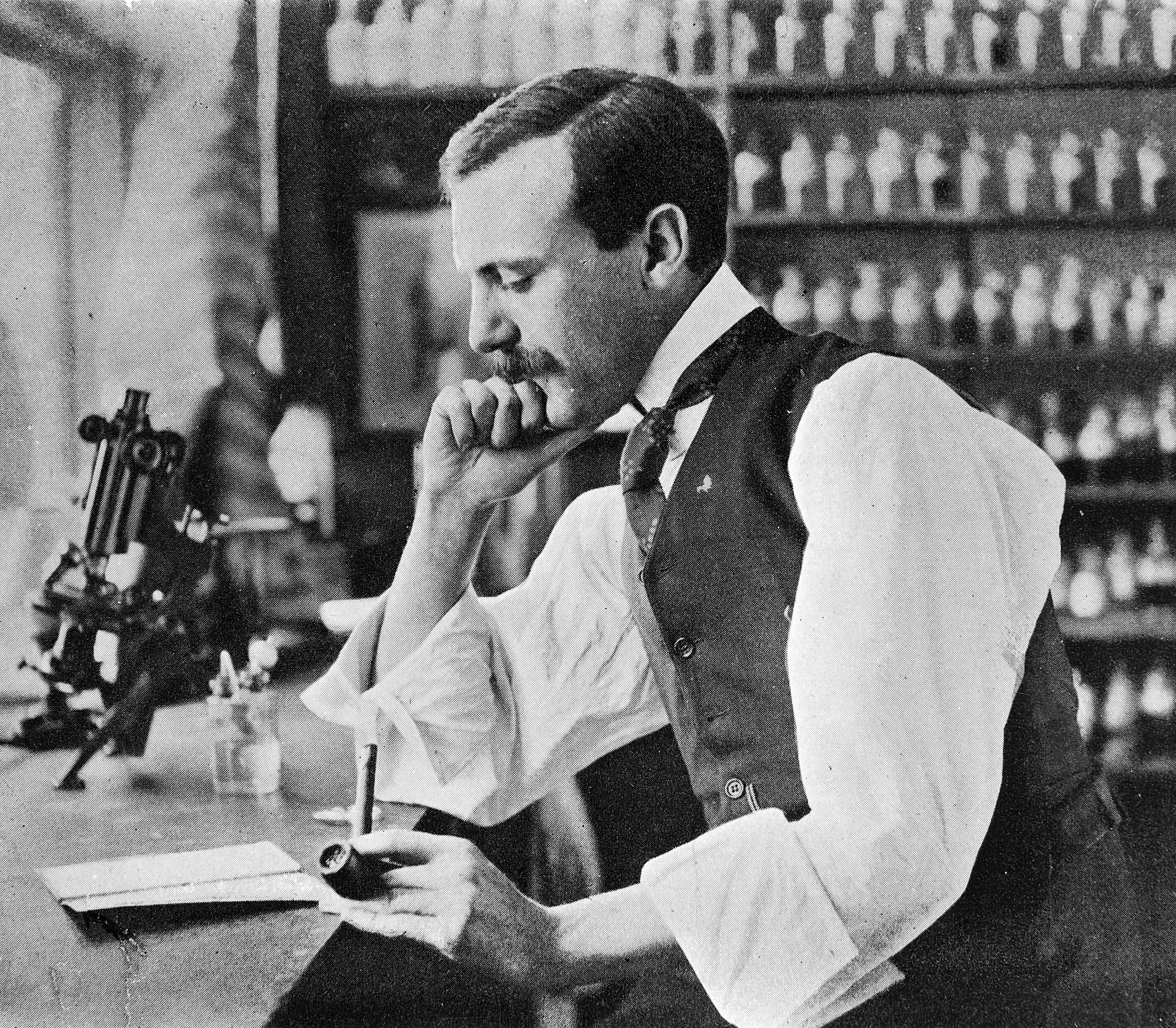
Walter Myers. Wellcome M0013782

In 1891 he entered the Pathological Laboratory in the University of Cambridge where he continued to work under Professor Alfredo Kanthack until 1898. In February 1899 he was elected to the John Lucas Walker Studentship in Pathology, a scholarship given by the University of Cambridge for original pathological research, on the recommendation of Professor Kanthack for Myers’ work on blood and its diseases, and on the theory of immunity.

Under the scholarship Myers studied in three leading laboratories in Germany. He first went to the University of Freiburg to continue his pathological investigation under Professor Ernst Ziegler where he soon produced some further excellent work on cobra poisoning and the development of antivenom serums, and his preliminary investigations on the action of the various forms of proteids and their antibodies were some of the most important contributions to the study of immunity at that time. He then went to Berlin under Professor Robert Koch, a pioneering microbiologist and founder of modern bacteriology who received the Nobel Prize in 1905 for his groundbreaking research on tuberculosis; and subsequently to Frankfurt under Professor Paul Ehrlich who received the Nobel Prize in 1908 for his contributions to immunology.

In June 1900 under the auspices of the Liverpool School of Tropical Medicine Myers accompanied fellow eminent Cambridge scientist, Dr Herbert Durham who led the Yellow Fever Expedition to Brazil. In 1881 the Cuban epidemiologist Dr Carlos Finlay was the first to theorise that yellow fever was transmitted by mosquitoes, but this remained unproven in the wider scientific community. While en route to Brazil they visited the U.S. Naval Hospital (now Walter Reed National Military Medical Center) in Washington where they met U.S. Surgeon General George Miller Sternberg who is considered the first U.S. bacteriologist, and then proceeded to Havana where they met Dr Finlay and his co-workers on 25 July 1900, and also the U.S. Army Yellow Fever Commission, led by Dr Walter Reed, which subsequently confirmed Dr Finlay's theory. Among Reed's team was bacteriologist Dr Jesse Lazear who died a month later on 26 September aged 34 after deliberately allowing an infected mosquito bite him in order to study the disease.

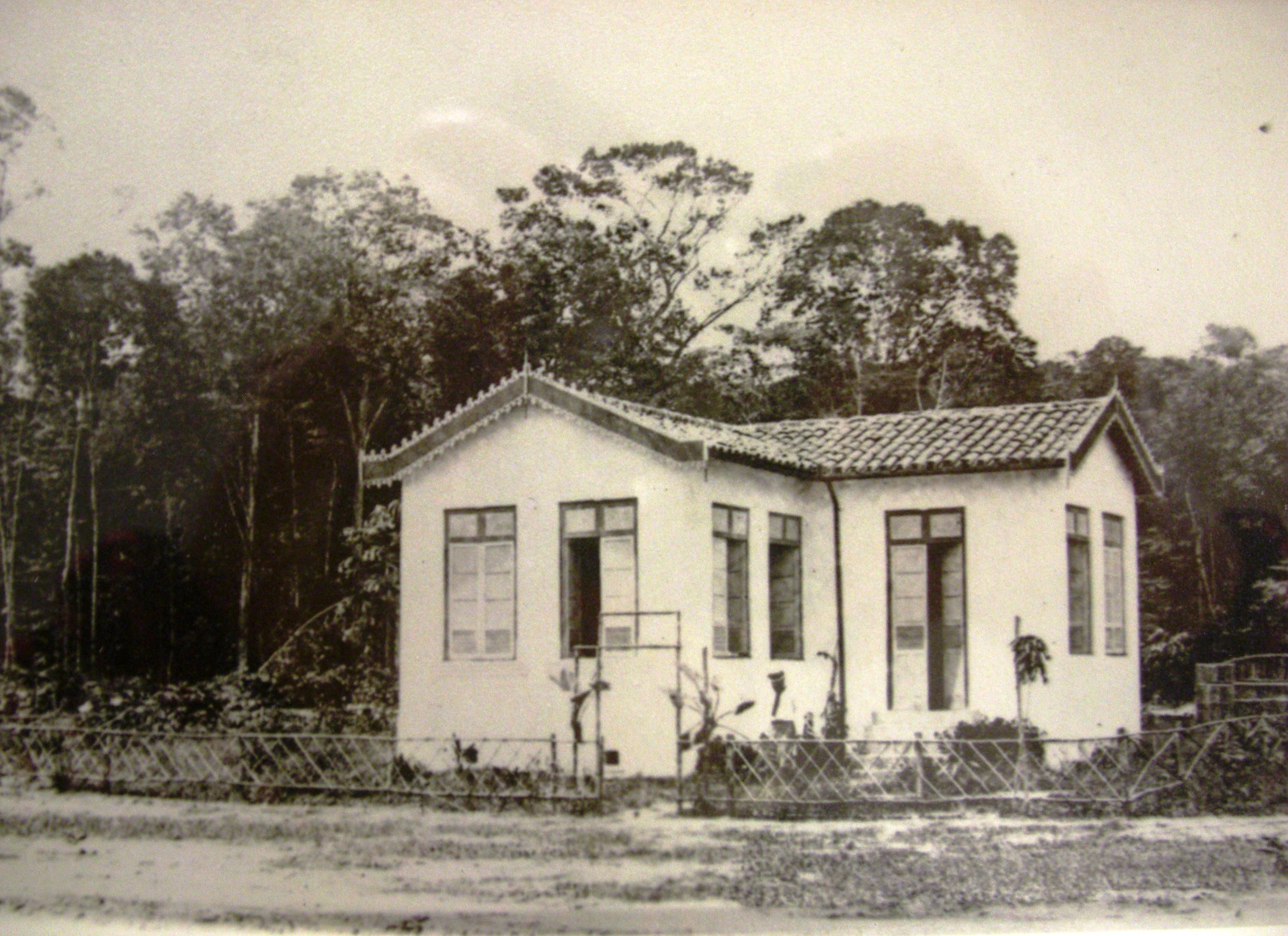
Yellow fever laboratory in Para, Brazil. LSTM Archive

On 24 August Durham and Myers arrived in Pari (modern day Belém) in the northern state of Pará, Brazil, where they established a laboratory in Domingos Freire Hospital to study the transmission of the disease and were among the first to establish its transmission by mosquitoes. Durham and Myers were aware of the risks that they were taking; however, on 16 January 1901, after conducting the fourteenth autopsy on victims of yellow fever both men found they were themselves infected. They were transferred to the Domingos Freire Isolation Hospital in Pari where Durham recovered but Myers died four days later, aged 28. In his subsequent report Durham deduced that they had both been infected through mosquito bites.

My dear colleague. I have learned with the greatest sorrow of the death of our common pupil and friend, Myers. It is, indeed, a great loss - such an able, strenuous, trustworthy worker, and of so good a character. When you receive more detailed particulars from Dr Durham, may I ask you to kindly communicate them to me?

— Translation of letter from Prof Ehrlich

Those who follow the development of pathological investigation in this country had looked forward to much and most valuable work coming from Walter Myers.
The researches he had already carried to a successful issue, characterised by rare insight, great accuracy and perseverance, had gained for him a name of which older men might well be proud. Myers’ death, which he met whilst carrying on investigations which had for their object the elucidation of the aetiology, pathology, and treatment of yellow fever, came as a great shock to his friends, and now even those who knew him only through his work feel keenly that Pathology has lost a splendid worker.

— Extract from obituary in the Journal of Pathology and Bacteriology

An abstract of the resulting interim report of the expedition by his colleague Dr. Durham appeared in The Lancet and a full report was published the following year.

== Legacy ==
The Liverpool School of Tropical Medicine paid for a headstone to be placed on Myers’ grave in Pari and for a memorial plaque to be placed on the school building in Liverpool and also at Birmingham University where Myers first studied.

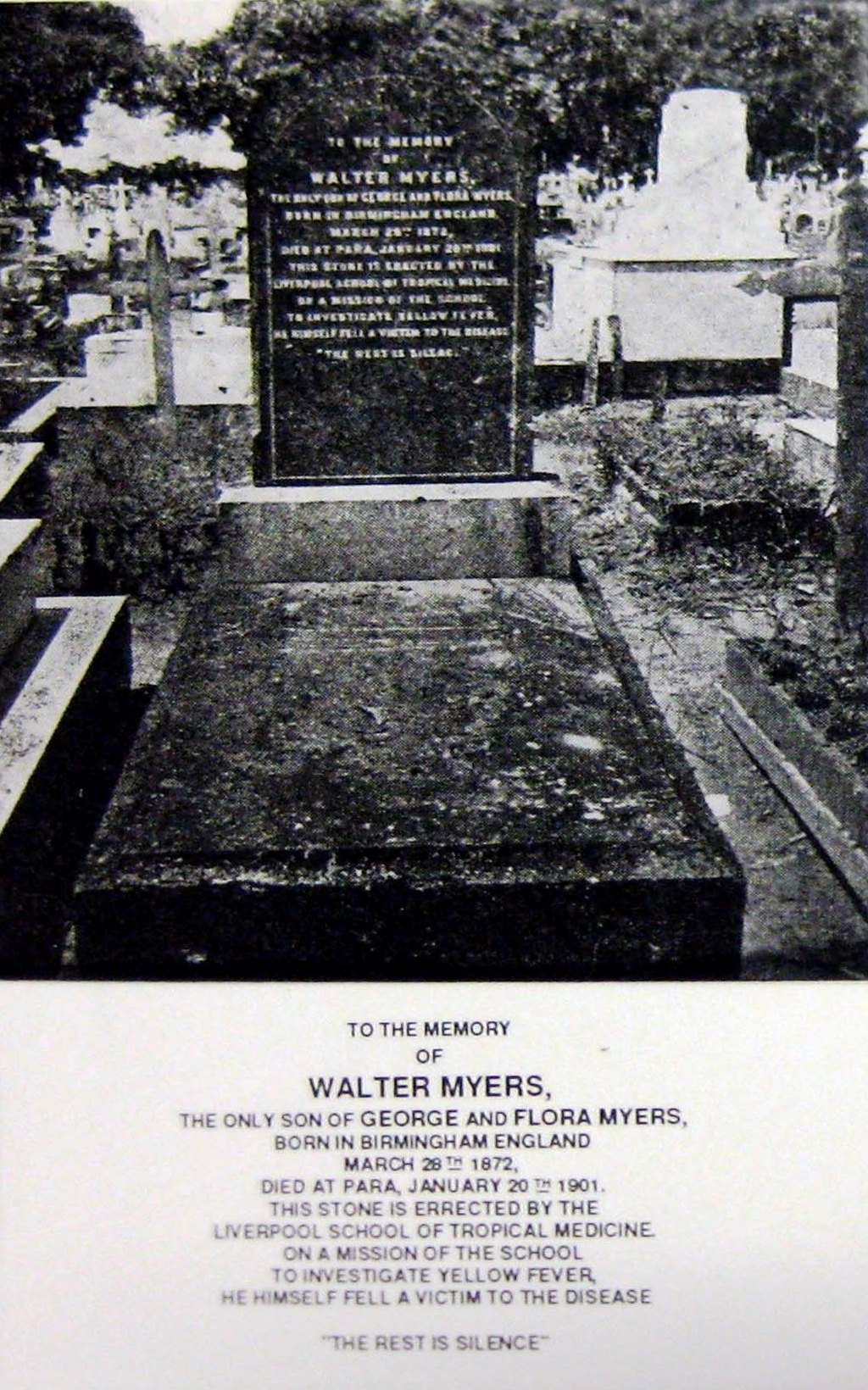
Myer's grave in Para, Brazil

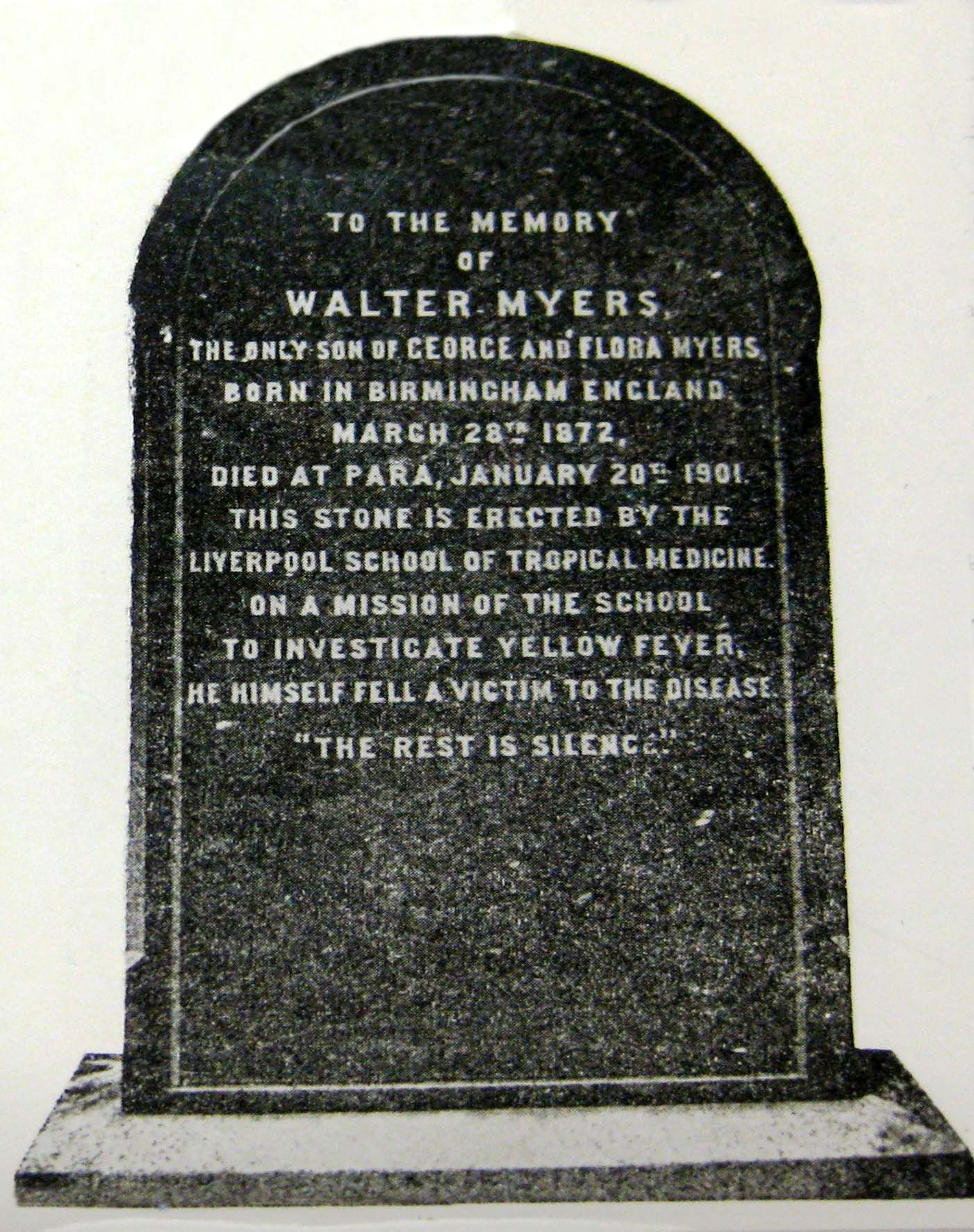
Myers headstone in Para, Brazil

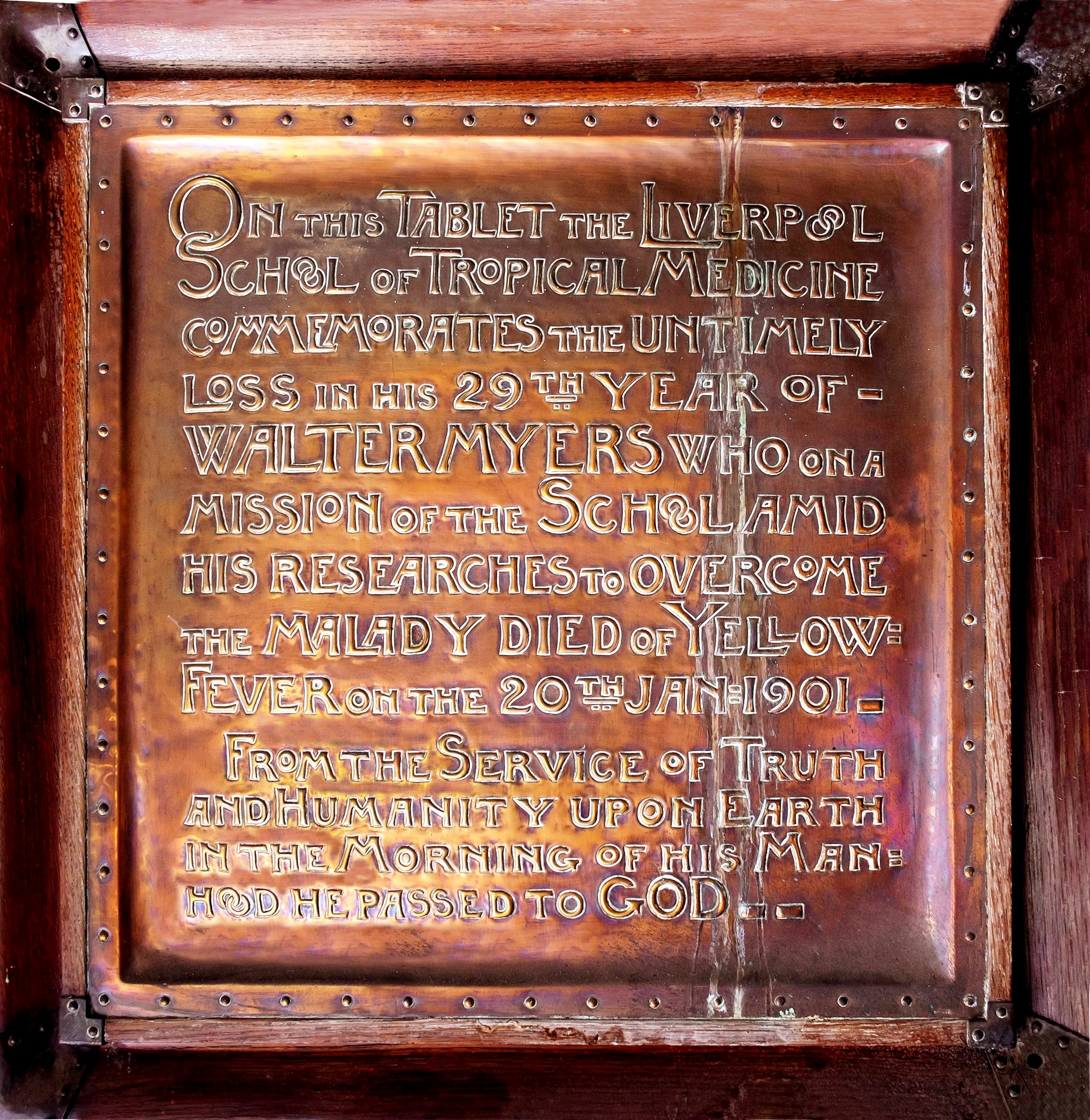
Myer's memorial tablet at Liverpool School of Tropical Medicine

A fund (to which his father and uncle Charles Samuel contributed) was set up to fund a permanent Walter Myers Chair of Parasitology at the Liverpool School of Tropical Medicine and also a 5-year fellowship called the Walter Myers Fellowship of Tropical Medicine. The Chair still exists, with Prof Stephen A Ward the current incumbent.

A Scholarship in Myers' name is awarded in Caius College Cambridge for outstanding results obtained in the Part II year.

== Bibliography ==
Myers’ contributions to the scientific journals include:

- Cobra poison in relation to Wasserman’s new theory of immunity. Lancet, 1898;ii:23
- The action of cobra poison on the blood: a contribution to the study of passive immunity. In collaboration with JWW Stevens. Journal of Pathology and Bacteriology, 1898;v:279
- On the interaction of toxin and antitoxin, illustrated by the reaction between cobra lysin and its antitoxin. Journal of Pathology and Bacteriology, 1900;vi:415
- Influence of cobra poison in the clotting of blood and the action of Calmette’s antivenomous serum on the phenomenon. Myers and Stevens. Proceedings of Physiological Society, Journal of Physiology;xxiii
- On immunity against proteids. Lancet, 1900;ii:98

Myers translated a classical work by Professor Paul Ehrlich on Blood and its Diseases from German.
