= Henry Adrian Churchill =

British diplomat and archaeological explorer

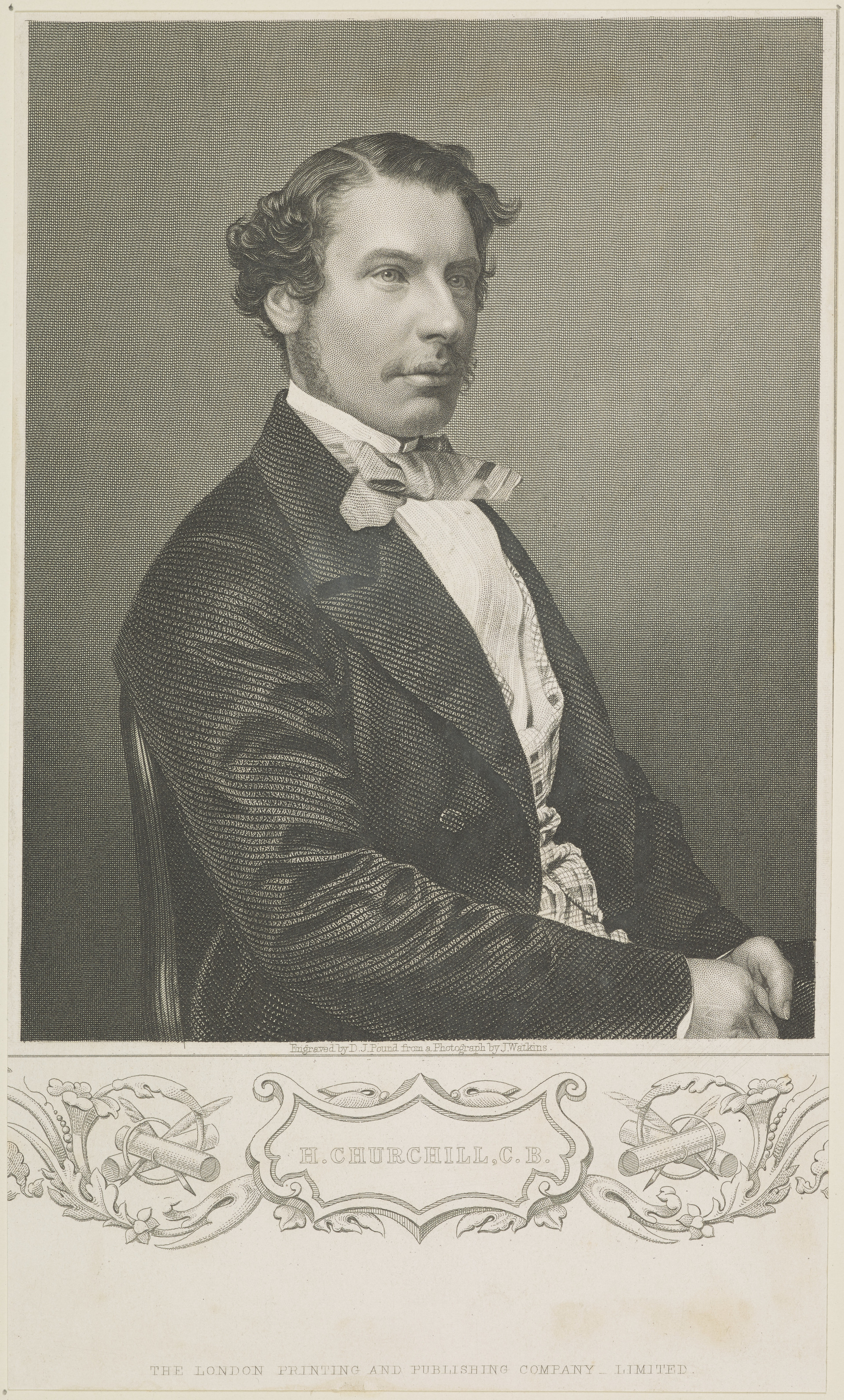
Henry Adrian Churchill

Henry Adrian Churchill CB (16 September 1828 – 12 July 1886) was an archaeological explorer of ancient Mesopotamia and a British diplomat who stopped much of the commercial slavery in Zanzibar and helped prevent a war between Zanzibar and Oman.

== Family and early life ==
Churchill was born in Adrianople (modern day Edirne) in Turkish Thrace, the son of William Nosworthy Churchill. His second name was derived from his place of birth. His father was familiar with the Turkish language and the Ottoman Turkish script, having worked as a dragoman for the American Embassy in Constantinople (now Istanbul) and founded the first semi-official newspaper Ceride-i Havadis . His mother Beatrix (née Belhomme) was the daughter of a French merchant who had settled in the Ottoman Empire.

He married Maria Braniewska (b. Warsaw 1839? – d. Pará, Brazil 1905) with whom he had 7 children. Four of his five sons, Harry Lionel (1860–1924), Sidney John Alexander (1862–1921), William Algernon (1865–1947), and George Percy (1877-1973) followed him into the diplomatic service.

== Education ==
In 1837, when aged nine, his father sent him to England to attend boarding schools in Ewell and then Kentish Town, where he learnt English and mathematics. In 1841 he went to Lycée Louis-le-Grand in Paris where he studied languages, mathematics, and art. In 1846 he returned to Constantinople aged 18.

== Career ==
=== Turco-Persian Boundary Commission ===
Chaldaea, south west Mesopotamia

In 1848 at the age of 20 Churchill began his career in the service of the Crown by assisting the British Commission for the Delimitation of the Turco-Persian Boundary as part of the 1849–52 Turco-Persian Frontier Commission. While serving in the Frontier Commission, along with friend and fellow archaeologist William Loftus and a detachment of troops, he rode across the desert and marshes of Chaldaea from the Euphrates to the lower Tigris, observing remains as they went. During their travels Churchill made extensive detailed drawings and sketches, which were subsequently deposited in the British Museum and the Geological Society.

From 1850-52 he was Secretary and Interpreter to the Commission, and in 1852 was appointed 3rd Paid Attaché in Teheran.

=== Military service ===
In 1854 at the age of 26 he was attached to the staff of Major General Sir William Fenwick Williams. He was able to speak and read Arabic and acted as translator to Colonel Atwell Lake. As Secretary and Interpreter on the Staff of the British Commissioner with the Turkish Army in Asia, he took part in the defence of Kars, and after its capitulation to General Mouravieff in November 1855 was for a time a prisoner of the Russians.

When General Williams began to engage transport mules and horses, we got a large amount of corn and rice sent to Kars. Mr Churchill, the General's secretary, worked hard at this department; and never were his practical, business-like talents more needed, or more effectively exercised. I desire particularly to call attention to the important services rendered by the above-named gentleman in this department, and at this critical period.

— Humphry Sandwith MD, A Narrative of the Siege of Kars

My secretary, Mr. Churchill, an attaché of Her Majesty's mission in Persia; he directed the fire of a battery throughout the action, and caused the enemy great loss.

— Colonel Atwell Lake, Kars and our captivity in Russia.

Some of his contemporary sketches of Kars are held in the Victoria and Albert Museum.

=== Diplomat ===
In 1856 at the age of 28 he was appointed British Consul in Sarajevo, Bosnia (1856), Jassy, Romania (1858), then Consul-General in Moldavia (1859), Syria (1862), Algeria (1863), and Consul in Zanzibar (1865).

During his time in Zanzibar he helped prevent a war by convincing Sultan Majid, the Sultan of Zanzibar, not to invade Oman. He also worked on anti-slavery issues with Sultan Majid who had consolidated his power around the East African slave trade, and stopped much of the commercial slavery then still occurring on Zanzibar. Unfortunately, the heavy workload and the adverse climate took a toll on his health and in September 1868 he sailed to Bombay but after reaching Somalia the ship was forced to return to Zanzibar, upon which Churchill found his health had improved and he continued his duties. However his recovery was short lived and in 1869 his Vice Consul and physician John Kirk advised him to leave for London for the sake of his health.

Churchill's relationship with Sultan Majid became so close that upon his departure from Zanzibar he received a valuable diamond ring. Churchill returned briefly to Zanzibar and worked to keep the peace after Sultan Majid died in October 1870, then in November 1870 wrote to the Secretary of State for Foreign Affairs advising that he had sent a reinforcement of seven men to Dr David Livingstone to replace seven men in his expedition who had died of cholera. He finally left Zanzibar in December 1870, leaving Kirk to undertake his duties.

He was subsequently appointed Consul in Resht, Persia (1875), and Palermo (1879) where he died in office in 1886 aged 57.

=== Artistic interests ===
He was a proficient artist and an accomplished watercolourist. A younger brother William was also a proficient artist and while visiting him at the British Consulate in Zanzibar in the late 1860s captured a wide range of scenes and people of contemporary Zanzibar which were published in the Illustrated London News.

== Decorations ==
- Légion d'Honneur for the Crimean War 1856
- Imperial Order of the Medjidie : Third Class 1857
- Companion of the Order of the Bath 1857
