= Ahmed Fevzi Pasha =

Ottoman Navy officer and politician (1836–1839)

Ahmed Fevzi Pasha (Ottoman Turkish: احمد فوزى پاشا; died 1840) was an Ottoman Navy officer and politician who served as Kapudan Pasha from 1836 to 1839. He is best known for his role in the Churchill affair and surrendering an Ottoman fleet to Muhammad Ali of Egypt in 1839 during the Egyptian–Ottoman War.

== Early life ==
Details of Ahmed Fevzi's early life are unknown. He was of Greek descent, and was born on the island of Crete before moving to Istanbul at a young age. Initially working as a boater, he subsequently entered the Ottoman Navy and rose the Navy's ranks to become deputy Kapudan Pasha.

== Churchill affair ==
In 1834, Fevzi Pasha was assigned to lead the Ottoman delegation which negotiated the Treaty of Saint Petersburg with the Russian Empire. He was subsequently implicated in the Churchill affair, a diplomatic crisis between the Ottoman Empire and the United Kingdom. The crisis began when British journalist William Nosworthy Churchill was imprisoned in the Imperial Arsenal after accidentally wounding a local child with his gun while out hunting in Kadıköy. Upon being notified of Churchill's imprisonment, British ambassador Lord Ponsonby demanded his immediate release from prison. The Ottoman Minister of Foreign Affairs, Akif Pasha, initially rejected Ponsonby's demand but changed his mind upon being informed that Churchill had been brutally assaulted by a local mob. The order to free Churchill was conveyed to Fevzi Pasha, who rejected it citing the lack of an official brief from the ministry, as well as the uncertainty of the Churchill's condition, which would influence the decision to press charges against him.

Lord Ponsonby subsequently sent a note to the Ottoman government on 10 May 1836 stating that Britain did not recognize Akif Pasha's ministership, and separately authored a report on 15 May 1836 to the British government in which he claimed that both Akif Pasha and Fevzi Pasha had received Russian bribes in relation to the Treaty of Saint Petersburg. On 27 May 1836, Lord Ponsonby held an audience with Koca Hüsrev Mehmed Pasha, a rival of Fevzi Pasha, where he conveyed the desire of the British government for the removal of both Akif Pasha and Fevzi Pasha from their offices. Whereas Akif Pasha was forcibly retired, either due to or with the pretext of his illness, Fevzi Pasha was promoted to the rank of Kapudan Pasha by Mahmud II on 10 November 1836. Academic Nedim İpek suggests that Lord Ponsonby's attempts to remove Fevzi Pasha was primarily motivated by a desire to curtail the increasing levels of Russian influence over the Ottoman Empire following the 1829 Treaty of Adrianople and 1833 Treaty of Hünkâr İskelesi.

== Capitulation of the Ottoman Fleet ==
Sultan Mahmud II died on July 2, 1839, during the Ottoman army's defeat by the Egyptian army at Nezip. His son, Abdülmecid I, ascended the throne at only 16 years old. During these difficult times for the Ottoman Empire, Koca Hüsrev Mehmed Pasha exerted pressure on the sultan and secured his appointment as Grand Vizier.

However, Ahmed Fevzi Pasha and Hüsrev Pasha were rivals. Hüsrev Pasha, as Grand Vizier, recalled Ahmed Fevzi Pasha, who at the time commanded the Ottoman fleet in the Aegean Sea, to Istanbul. Fearing execution upon arrival in Istanbul, Ahmed Fevzi Pasha decided to seek refuge in Egypt. Without revealing his true intentions to most of his men, he directed all his ships toward Egypt and dropped anchor in Alexandria, handing over the entire fleet to Mehmed Ali Pasha. Thus, the Ottoman fleet, completely destroyed at the Battle of Navarino 12 years earlier, was destroyed once again.

The Ottoman ships remained in Egypt for a long time. The Ottoman Empire was in a very weak position vis-à-vis Egypt. In 1841, Abdulmecid signed a decree that the governorship of Egypt would remain hereditary to the family of Muhammad Ali Pasha. Thus, the rebellion in Egypt ended. Ahmed Fevzi Pasha died in Egypt around 1840 years.

== Works cited ==
- İpek, Nedim (December 1995). "Churchill Vak'ası" [Churchill affair (1836)]. Belleten. 59 (226): 661–714. doi:10.37879/belleten.1995.661 – via belleten.gov.tr.
