= Harry Lionel Churchill =

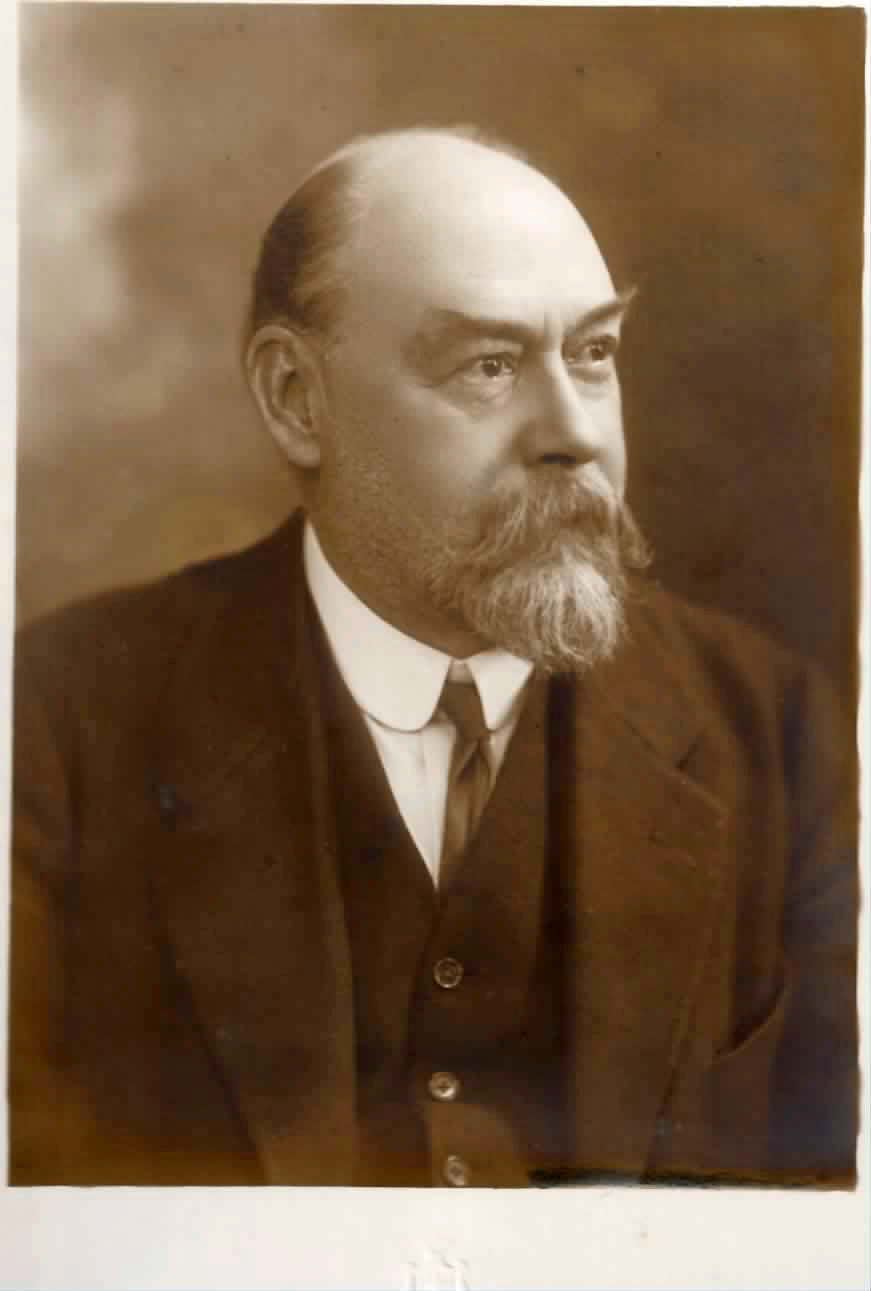
Harry Lionel Churchill CMG FRGS

Harry Lionel Churchill CMG FRGS (1860–1924) was a physician and British diplomat.

== Family and early life ==
He was born on 12 September 1860 in Jassy, Romania, the son of Henry Adrian Churchill (1828–1886), an archaeological explorer and British diplomat. Three of his four brothers, Sidney John Alexander (1860–1924), William Algernon (1865–1947), and George Percy (1876–1973) were also diplomats.

He married Elizabeth Théresé Eugenie Tholozan (1867–1930) with whom he had six children.

== Career ==
In 1878, at the age of 18 he was Acting Consul at Resht, Persia, and in 1880 made Clerk in the Legation at Tehran. In 1883 he served as British Vice-Consul as Translator and Clerk to her Majesty’s Legation in Teheran, then in 1885 Vice-Consul in Zanzibar where his father had previously been Consul from 1865–70.

He was in attendance on the Special Envoy sent by the Shah of Persia on the occasion of Queen Victoria’s Diamond Jubilee in 1887.

He was then Consul in Teheran (1891), Vice-Consul in Trieste (1899), Lisbon in 1905, then Consul-General in Le Havre (1907–1923), and Genoa (1923) where he died in office aged 64.

His correspondence with Lord Hardinge, first secretary at Tehran and later Viceroy of India, is held in the University of Cambridge Library.

== See also ==
List of diplomats of Great Britain to the Republic of Genoa
