= Syracuse War Cemetery =

CWGC cemetery in Sicily, Italy

Syracuse
- Commonwealth War Graves Commission
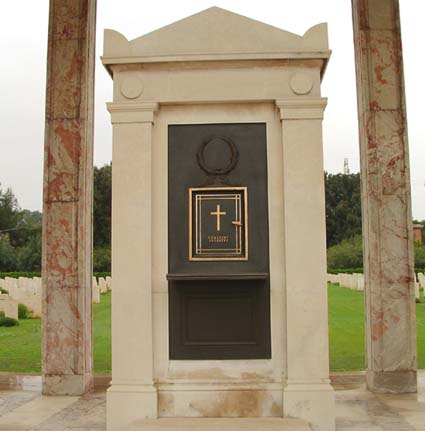
- Used for those deceased 1943
- Established: 1943
- Location: 37.0751°N 15.2580°E near Syracuse, Sicily, Italy
- Total burials: 1,059
- Unknowns: 126

Burials by nation
- Allied Powers: United Kingdom: Canada: 4; Newfoundland: Australia: New Zealand: South Africa: 7; Undivided India

Burials by war
- World War I: 1 World War II: 1,058

Syracuse War Cemetery is a Commonwealth War Graves Commission burial ground for the dead of World War II located near Syracuse on the island of Sicily.

== Foundation ==
The site of the cemetery was selected in 1943 at an early stage in the operations for the capture of Sicily. In this cemetery most of the graves are those of men who lost their lives in the landings in Sicily on 9/10 July 1943, as part of the early stages of the campaign to capture the island (Operation Husky).

=== Cemetery address ===
Via Per Floridia, 10 Contrada Canalicchio - 96100 Syracuse (SR) Sicily. GPS Co-ordinates: Latitude: 37.074765, Longitude: 15.257977.

== Burials ==
They include those of a considerable number who belonged to the airborne force that was landed immediately west of the town during the night 9–10 July. Graves were brought into Syracuse War Cemetery from as far north as Lentini. There is one grave for a casualty from World War I, a merchant seaman who was originally buried in the Marsala British Cemetery. In addition, three special memorials commemorate men known to have been originally buried in other cemeteries in the region, but whose graves could not be found on concentration.

The Italians, who would shortly make peace with the Allies and re-enter the war on their side, offered little determined resistance but German opposition was vigorous and stubborn. The campaign in Sicily came to an end on 17 August when the two allied forces came together at Messina, but failed to cut off the retreating Axis lines.

Commonwealth forces made their landings in the south-east corner of the island between Pachino and Syracuse, and the majority of those buried in Syracuse War Cemetery died during those landings or in the early stages of the campaign. Many graves belong to men of the airborne force that attempted landings west of the town on the night of 9-10 July, when gale force winds forced 60 of the 140 gliders used into the sea and blew others wide of their objectives.

== Notable Burials ==
- Group Captain Walter Churchill DSO DFC, Plot V, Row D, Grave 3.
- Mne Albert Edward Streams, Albert Medal, Plot 3, Row B, Grave 5.
