= William Sydney Churchill =

British-Ottoman Gendarmerie officer

William Sydney Churchill (1860-1918) was a British Gendarmerie officer who served in Egypt, Crete, and Asia Minor during the Ottoman Empire.

== Early life and background ==
He was born in Constantinople in 1860 the son of Alfred Black Churchill (1826–1870), and Evelyn (née de Balzac) (1837-1875). He grew up in a multilingual family. His British grandfather William Nosworthy Churchill moved to Turkey aged 19 where he learnt the Turkish language and founded the Ceride-i Havadis newspaper. His mother and grandmother were both French. He married Elizabeth Benci with whom he had three children, Alfred 1894 in Constantinople, Evelyn 1895 in Egypt, and Feride 1898 in Crete.

In his later life a report by the Intelligence Department of the War Office described him as ’quite Levantine in speech manners and disposition, about 42 years old and married. He spoke English, French and Greek fluently, Italian well and Turkish moderately.’ The report mentioned that Churchill had never been to England, and did not state his nationality. It also stated that he was ‘active and serious,’ but that ‘on several occasions in the last year displayed plenty of pluck and coolness when in danger, but he is wanting in discretion.’ A British surgeon who knew him very well described him as ‘half an Englishman and more Turk than a Turk.’

== Career ==
In 1879-80 he served as an interpreter in the Cyprus Pioneers before being ‘discharged for indiscretions, not of a serious nature’ after which he returned to Constantinople.

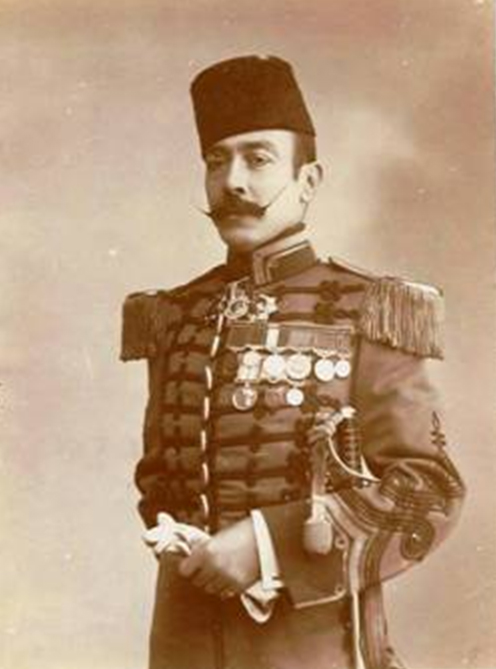
William Sydney Churchill in 1913 in the uniform of a Colonel in the Constantinople Gendarmerie

A few years later he went to Egypt where he served in the Egyptian Gendarmerie, and remained from five to seven years, rising to the rank of captain, before returning to Constantinople.

In February 1897 he went to Crete, where he was appointed as a captain in the ‘New Gendarmerie’ and subsequently transferred to the replacement all Cretan Gendarmerie and promoted to the rank of major. He was the senior officer in the Gendarmerie operating in the British-controlled sector of the island, based in Candia, modern day Iraklion or Heraklion, under control of the Ottoman governor general.

Two illustrations in the Illustrated London News of 20 March 1897 show Churchill acting as an interpreter in the suppression of the Gendarmerie mutiny.

Montenegro was appointed international peacekeeping missionary and executor of international decisions in Crete. After Churchill criticised Montenegrin officer Duke Božo Petrović which he took to be an insult to his country, he challenged Churchill to a duel under Montenegrin rules, meaning that one who wins has to behead the loser, however Churchill declined the challenge, and following mediation by Dzevat Pasha, Petrović accepted Churchill’s public apology.

Intercommunal violence prevailed between Christians and Muslims and in Candia province (modern day Heraklion) all 36 mosques were destroyed In eastern Crete at least a thousand Muslims were murdered – around a quarter of the population, and the survivors moved to Candia where they were a resentful minority in a besieged population of 52,000 refugees living within the city walls under difficult conditions. Eighteen months later, in August 1898, the Western Powers, through the Council of Admirals, recognised the insurrectionary Christian Administration as the sole local authority in Crete. They then ordered the dismissal of the Cretan Muslims in the Dime or tax office and replaced them by Christians, which provoked an uprising. The British Vice-Consul, Lysimachus Calechorino, was also a moneylender and the Calechorino family were among the largest purchasers of Muslim land, and his unpopularity was in no small part the cause of the insurrection on 6 September 1898 when armed Muslim irregular groups attacked the British security force in Candia and began attacking the Christian population. Churchill and his mainly Cretan Muslim gendarmes were heavily outnumbered and unable to quell the insurrection, during which the British Vice-Consul and his family were killed, also 14 British military personnel, and about 500–800 Christian inhabitants are estimated to have been massacred. The British government sought to find someone responsible for the Candia massacre and tried to use Churchill as a scapegoat even though his gendarmes were heavily outnumbered and the Ottoman military forces took no action to prevent the rioting and indeed some were involved in it, and it was later revealed that the local Ottoman ruler, Ethem Bey, was himself involved in the outbreak of the violence. No action was taken against Churchill and he left Crete.

Churchill remained in Ottoman service and promoted to colonel in 1907 while working as a council member in the Gendarmerie Directorate (Jandarma Dairesi Azasý), and then Deputy Commander.

He died in Constantinople on 30 July 1918 aged 57 and is buried in the Carré St Joseph Catholic Cemetery of Feriköy, Istanbul.
