= George Percy Churchill =

British historian and diplomat

George Percy Churchill CBE FSA (1877–1973) was a British historian and diplomat.

== Early life ==
He was born in 1877 the son of Henry Adrian Churchill, an archaeological explorer and British diplomat. Three of his four brothers, Harry Lionel, Sidney John Alexander William Algernon were also diplomats.

In 1906 he married Muriel East (d. 1968) with whom he had two sons.

== Career ==
He was Oriental Secretary at the British Legation in Tehran from 1903. He could read and write in the Persian language and translated The Constitution granted to Persia, 30 December 1906 and, at a date unknown, wrote Farhang-i rijāl-i Qājār

In 1906 he wrote Biographical Notices of Persian Statesmen and Notables comprising an index of prominent Qajar statesmen, a collection of notes, genealogical tables, and over 300 seal impressions. Copies are held at the India Office records at the British Library, the Foreign Office records at the National Archives, and in libraries at Bamberg, Cambridge and Canberra.

This collection of notes and genealogical tables is the only document of its kind and serves an ‘indispensable source to ascertain who the British held in high regard and who they considered to be pro-Russian or independent’.

— Cyrus Ghani, Iran and the West: A Critical Bibliography London, Kegan Paul International, 1987

Churchill’s work represents an important work in the context of British colonial knowledge of the political landscape of Qajar Iran at the beginning of the twentieth century. What stands out most in Churchill’s draft is the abundance of seal impressions – over 300 of them – that appear to have been cut out from Persian correspondence and envelopes. Many of the notes are accompanied by imprints of the subject's seal and signature (in Persian); some by typescript pages, extracts from published works and newspaper cuttings; and a few by portrait photographs. The notes give the subject's name as heading, and various information including dates of birth and death, office and career history, family details (including members of the Shah's family), pay and financial details, interests, linguistic abilities, and some personal comments.

— George Percy Churchill’s Biographical Notices of Persian Statesmen and Notables, The British Library

In 1919 he was employed by the Foreign Office and attached to the English Suite of the Shah of Persia during his Majesty's State visit to England in 1919, and was given the first class of the Order of the Lion and Sun.

In 1924 he was appointed British Consul-General in Algiers, a position to which his father had previously been posted in 1863. In 1927 he wrote A Historical Sketch of Algeria.

Churchill was appointed a Commander of the Order of the British Empire (CBE) in the 1924 Birthday Honours.

== Bibliography ==
- Biographical Notices of Persian Statesmen and Notables, George Percy Churchill, Government of India Foreign Department, 1906
- The Constitution granted to Persia, December 30, 1906. Persian text and an English translation by G.P. Churchill. Teheran, 1906
- Farhang-i rijāl-i Qājār, George Percy Churchill, Intishārāt-i Zarrīn, Iran.
- A Historical Sketch of Algeria, George Percy Churchill, Imprimerie Algerienne, 1927
