= Walter Churchill =

British World War II flying ace

Walter Myers Churchill
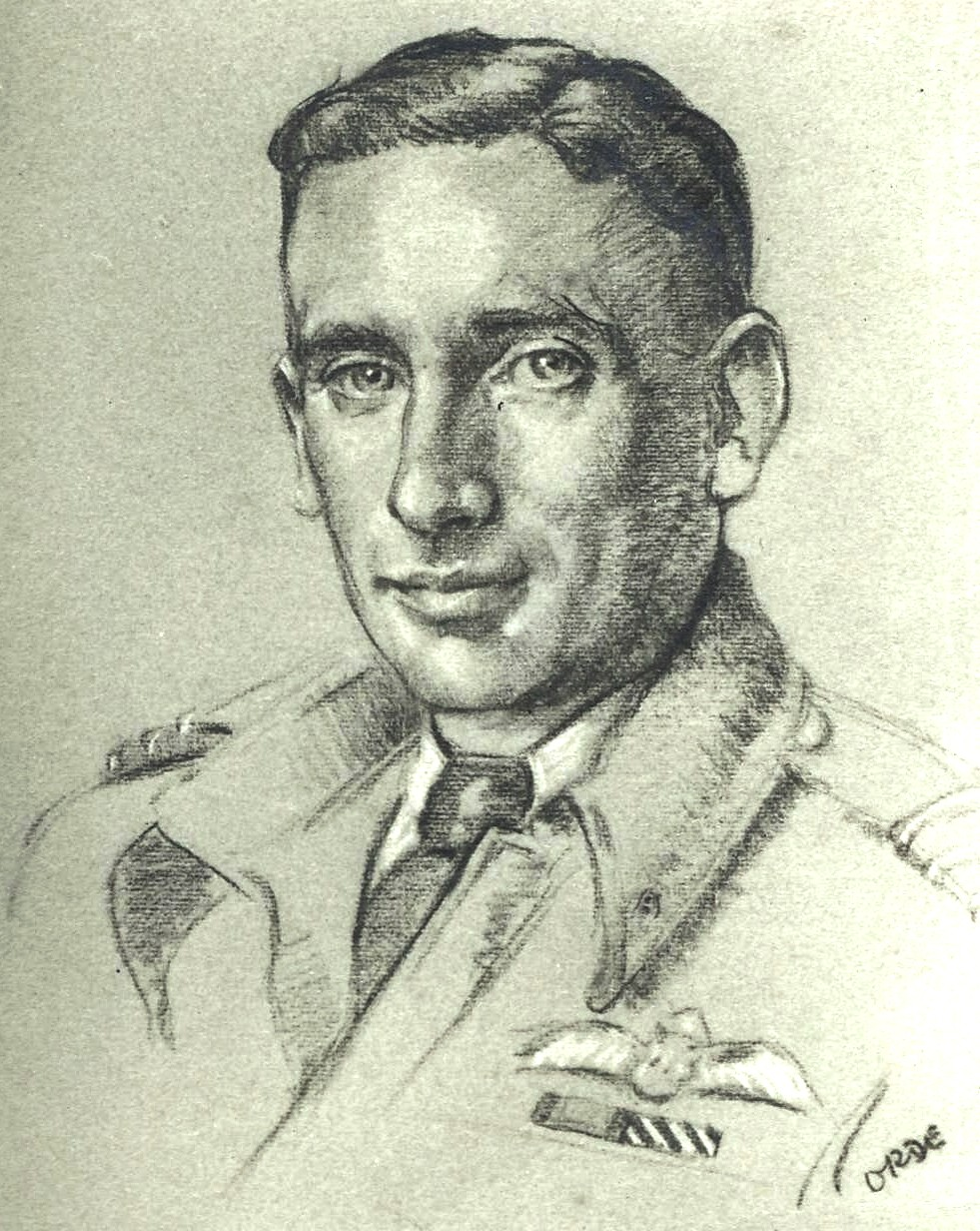
- Portrait of Squadron Leader Walter Churchill DSO DFC by Cuthbert Orde
- Born: 24 November 1907; Amsterdam, Netherlands
- Died: 27 August 1942 (aged 34); Sicily, Italy
- Burial place: Syracuse War Cemetery, Sicily
- Military career
- Allegiance: United Kingdom
- Branch: Royal Air Force
- Service years: 1932–1942
- Rank: Group captain
- Service number: 90241
- Commands: RAF Valley (1942); No. 71 Squadron (1940–41); No. 605 Squadron (1940); No. 3 Squadron (1940)
- Conflicts: World War II: Battle of Britain; Siege of Malta
- Awards: Distinguished Service Order; Distinguished Flying Cross

Group captain Walter Myers Churchill, DSO, DFC (24 November 1907 – 27 August 1942) was a Royal Air Force pilot and flying ace credited with destroying seven aircraft during World War II

Churchill was the elder brother of Peter Churchill and Oliver Churchill, both of whom were Special Operations Executive officers during the Second World War.

== Early life ==
Churchill was born in Amsterdam, Netherlands, on 24 November 1907 to William Algernon Churchill, a British diplomat, and singer Violet Churchill (née Myers). William served as a British consul in Mozambique and Pará in Brazil prior to Walter's birth, and in Amsterdam, Stockholm, Milan, Palermo, and Algiers in Walter's youth. William was also an art connoisseur, and author of what is still the standard reference work on early European paper and papermaking, Watermarks in Paper.

Churchill was named after his uncle Walter Myers, an eminent physician and bacteriologist who died in 1901 aged 28. He was educated at Sedbergh School, and in 1926 read Modern Languages at King's College, Cambridge. He then became an aeronautical engineer with Armstrong Siddeley Motors, Coventry, after which he started an aviation precision engineering company, Churchill Components (Coventry) Ltd, in 1937, which supplied machined parts such as exhaust valves for radial aero-engines to Armstrong Siddeley. After being blitzed out of Coventry in 1941, the company re-located to Market Bosworth. The company worked for Sir Frank Whittle, the jet-engine pioneer, and it machined compressor blades for the gas-turbine engines in the early 1940s.

== Royal Air Force ==
Churchill was commissioned as a pilot officer in the Auxiliary Air Force on 11 January 1932 and appointed to No.605 (County of Warwick) Squadron. He was promoted to flight lieutenant in June 1937 and transferred from the AAF to the Auxiliary Air Force Reserve of Officers in January 1939. He was recalled to No.605 Squadron and full-time service in August 1939, and commanded the squadron from June to September 1940, when he was succeeded by Archie McKellar. Churchill later served with No.3 Squadron and No.71 (Eagle) Squadron and took part in the Battle of Britain as a squadron leader. On 11 September 1940 his Hurricane was badly damaged in combat over Maidstone but he was able to land at Croydon, slightly wounded.

During his tenure as Squadron Commander with 71 (Eagle) at RAF Debden, he instructed his pilots to land the outdated Brewster Buffaloes with their tail wheels unlocked, causing damage to the aircraft after which Hurricanes were issued to the squadron.

Churchill was an 'ace' pilot credited with seven "kills", and was awarded a Distinguished Service Order and a Distinguished Flying Cross.

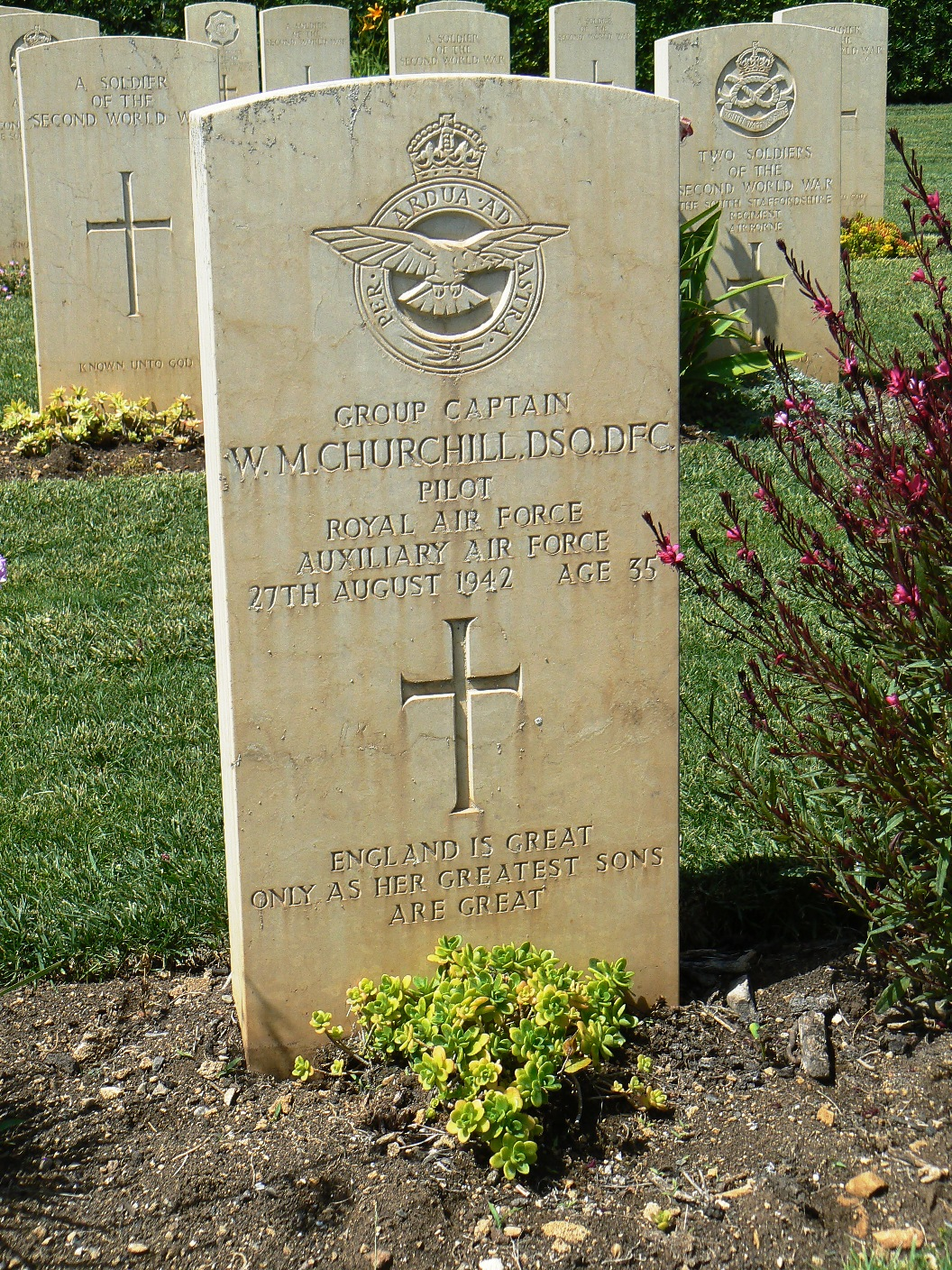
Gravestone at Syracuse War Cemetery, Sicily

He also evaluated various makes of fighter aircraft for the RAF and played a key role in getting Spitfire aircraft to the defence of Malta. In August 1942, he was posted as Group Captain to command RAF Ta Kali in Malta where he planned attacks on Sicily in preparation for Operation Husky and led the first raid on 23 August. Four days later, leading a raid on Biscari airfield near Gela in southern Sicily he was killed when his Spitfire was hit by flak and crashed in flames. He was buried at the Syracuse War Cemetery.

Extract of letter from Air Vice Marshal Keith Park, Air Officer Commanding, RAF Mediterranean, to his widow:

Dear Mrs Churchill,

I am writing because I feel that it may be some comfort to you in your great loss to know that your husband met his end leading a fighter formation in a most successful attack on the enemy. Although Walter Churchill has passed on, his fine example and inspired leadership will live on in Malta to the end of the war. He arrived in Malta leading a formation of reinforcing Spitfires to protect the last vitally important convoy. During his all too short stay in Malta Walter Churchill was an inspiration to the fighter squadron in the air and on the ground.

If it was ordained that Walter Churchill was to give his life for his country I feel sure he would have chosen to end it as he did, leading a fighter formation on a daring and most successful fighter sweep over enemy territory.

The company continued under the management of his wife, Joyce, and subsequently that of his second son, James. The company is now known as JJ Churchill Ltd. and is managed by James's son, Andrew.

== Honours and awards ==
- 31 May 1940: Flight Lieutenant Walter Myers Churchill was awarded the Distinguished Flying Cross:

This officer has shot down three enemy aircraft since his arrival in France and has led many patrols with courage and skill.

— The London Gazette

- 31 May 1940: Flight Lieutenant Walter Myers Churchill DFC (90241) was appointed a Companion of the Distinguished Service Order:

This officer assumed command of a squadron shortly after its arrival in France and led it with marked success, inspiring his pilots and maintenance crews magnificently. He undertook the tactical instruction of new pilots, led many patrols successfully and organised his ground defences and crews in an exemplary manner. While under his command the squadron destroyed 62 enemy aircraft and he was throughout the main-spring of the offensive spirit, their excellent tactics and their adequate maintenance results. Only four pilots of the squadron were lost. Flight Lieutenant Churchill has recently destroyed four enemy aircraft, bringing his total to seven.

— The London Gazette

== Legacy ==
- Memorial plaque in King's College Chapel, Cambridge.

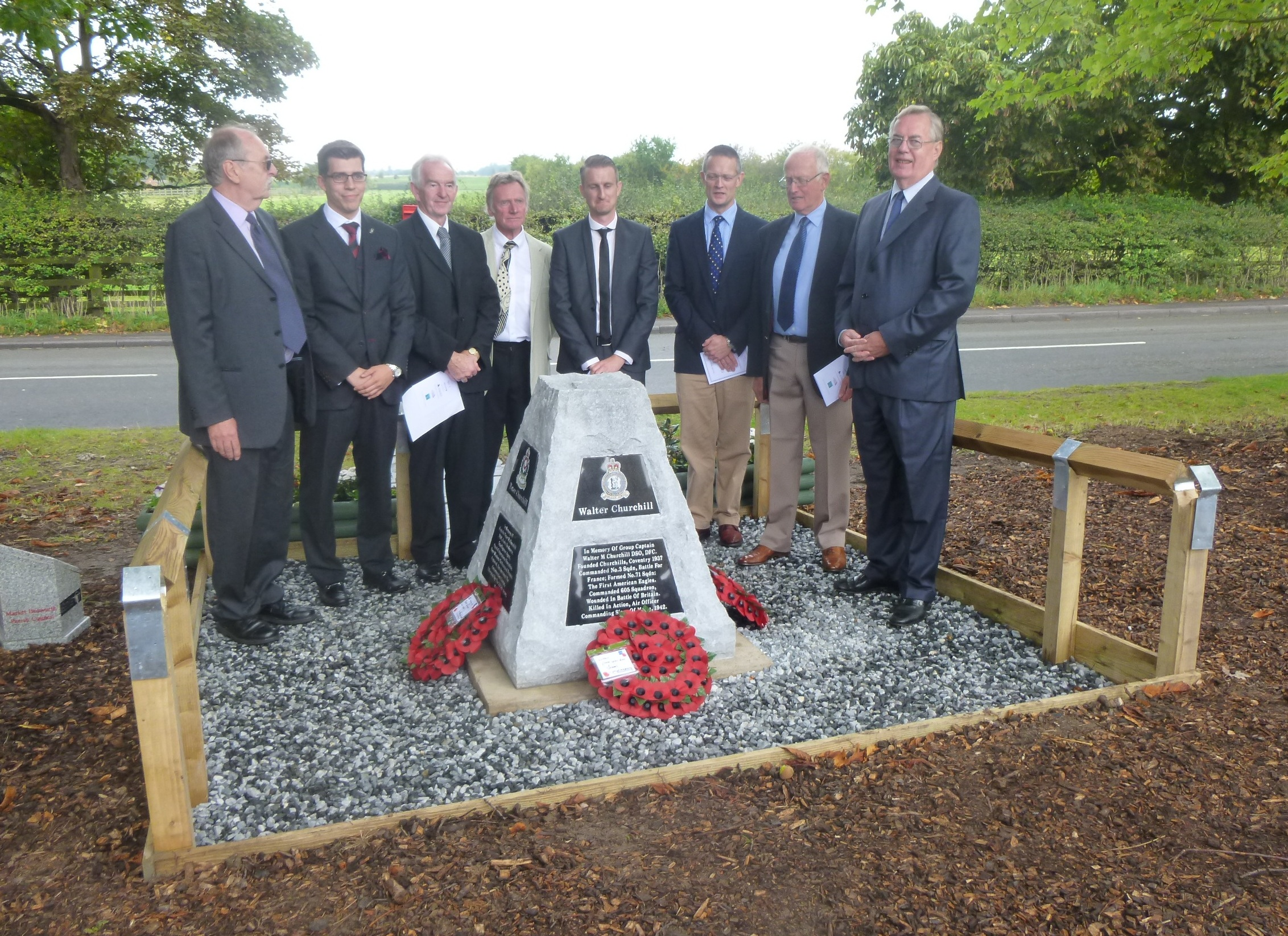
Memorial to the three Churchill Brothers

- Walter Churchill relocated his engineering business, JJ Churchill, from Coventry to Market Bosworth during the war. After the Market Bosworth Historical Society became aware of the wartime gallantry of not just Walter, but also of his brothers Peter and Oliver, it decided to fund a Memorial Cairn. The granite Cairn is located in front of the JJ Churchill factory, and was unveiled in autumn 2015. Three of the four sides commemorate each of the Churchill brothers, while the fourth side commemorates the factory's relocation from Coventry to Market Bosworth and Walter Churchill landing his Hurricane in the field opposite while overseeing the factory's move.

== Bibliography ==
- Cull, Brian. Spitfires over Malta – The Epic Air Battles of 1942. London: Grub Street, 2005. ISBN 1-904943-30-6.
