= Ruth Plant =

British architect

Ruth Plant (15 September 1912 - 17 April 1988) ARIBA, A.A. Dip. was a British architect who studied the painted churches in Eastern Europe and rock hewn churches in Ethiopia.

== Biography ==
Ruth Isabella Myers Churchill was born in Aberdeen on 15 September 1912, the daughter of British diplomat and artist historian, Sydney Churchill, and his wife Dr Stella Churchill (née Myers), a psychologist, psychotherapist and politician.

She was educated at Notting Hill High School for Girls from 1924–30, then spent 6 months living in a flat opposite Adolf Hitler’s house in Munich while learning German, before studying at the Architectural Association School of Architecture from 1931–36, then practised as an architect.

After her marriage to Donald Craik ARIBA, A.A. Dip in May 1936 they spent 6 months driving across Europe to Hungary, Romania and Bukovina to record the painted churches that now are UNESCO World Heritage Sites after he had been awarded the Owen Jones Colour scholarship in 1935.

In 1939 with her husband and Antony Chitty she set up the London Institute of Design, which was moved to Bath at the outbreak of the war, and closed after her husband volunteered to join the RAFVR in 1940. After his death in March 1942 while serving as an RAFVR pilot, she married agronomist Dr William Plant in 1944 with whom she had a son Stewart and a daughter Juliette, adding to sons David and Brian from her first marriage.

After the war she taught architecture in Bristol Architectural School, and undertook some private practice that included restoring her home Tickenham Court, Community halls, and updating the village church screens.

She studied the Painted Monasteries of Bukovina in pre-war Romania until her attention was turned to Ethiopia. In 1967 she travelled to Addis Ababa accompanying an old friend who was an acquaintance of Emperor Haile Selassie’s daughter Princess Tenagnework, and also to the northern Tigre Region as a guest of the Governor and his wife, Princess Aida Desta, daughter of Princess Tenagnework. This started her interest in Ethiopian rock churches which were then scarcely known to the world of scholarship and resulted in six trips between 1967 and 1974 covering over 100 churches and in total nearly a year away from the UK. She travelled frugally caring little for her own comfort or safety, focusing on her intellectual pursuit. After the revolution in 1974 Princess Tenagnework and Princess Aida Desta were among the female members of the Royal Family who were imprisoned and Ruth was among a group who lobbied heavily to the Foreign Office and local pressure groups for their release.

She presented papers on research at international conferences and in 1985 published a book Architecture of the Tigre, Ethiopia. For her research she was awarded an M. Lit. from Bristol University.

In 1985 in failing health aged 73 and accompanied by her eldest son and daughter-in-law she visited Cappadocia, Turkey, to compare the rock churches/buildings with those she had seen in Ethiopia but found no similarity.

== Bibliography ==
- The Making of a Manor: The story of Tickenham Court. Denys Forest (1975) ISBN 0239001516
- Architecture of the Tigre, Ethiopia. Ruth Plant, Worcester: Ravens Educational and Development Services Ltd, (1985) ISBN 0947895000
- Rock-hewn Churches of the Tigre Province, Ruth Plant and David Roden Buxton (1970) OCLC 911914016
