= Sidney J. A. Churchill =

Sidney John Alexander Churchill MVO (1 March 1862 – 11 January 1921), often referred to as Sidney J. A. Churchill, was a British diplomat, art connoisseur and author.

== Life ==
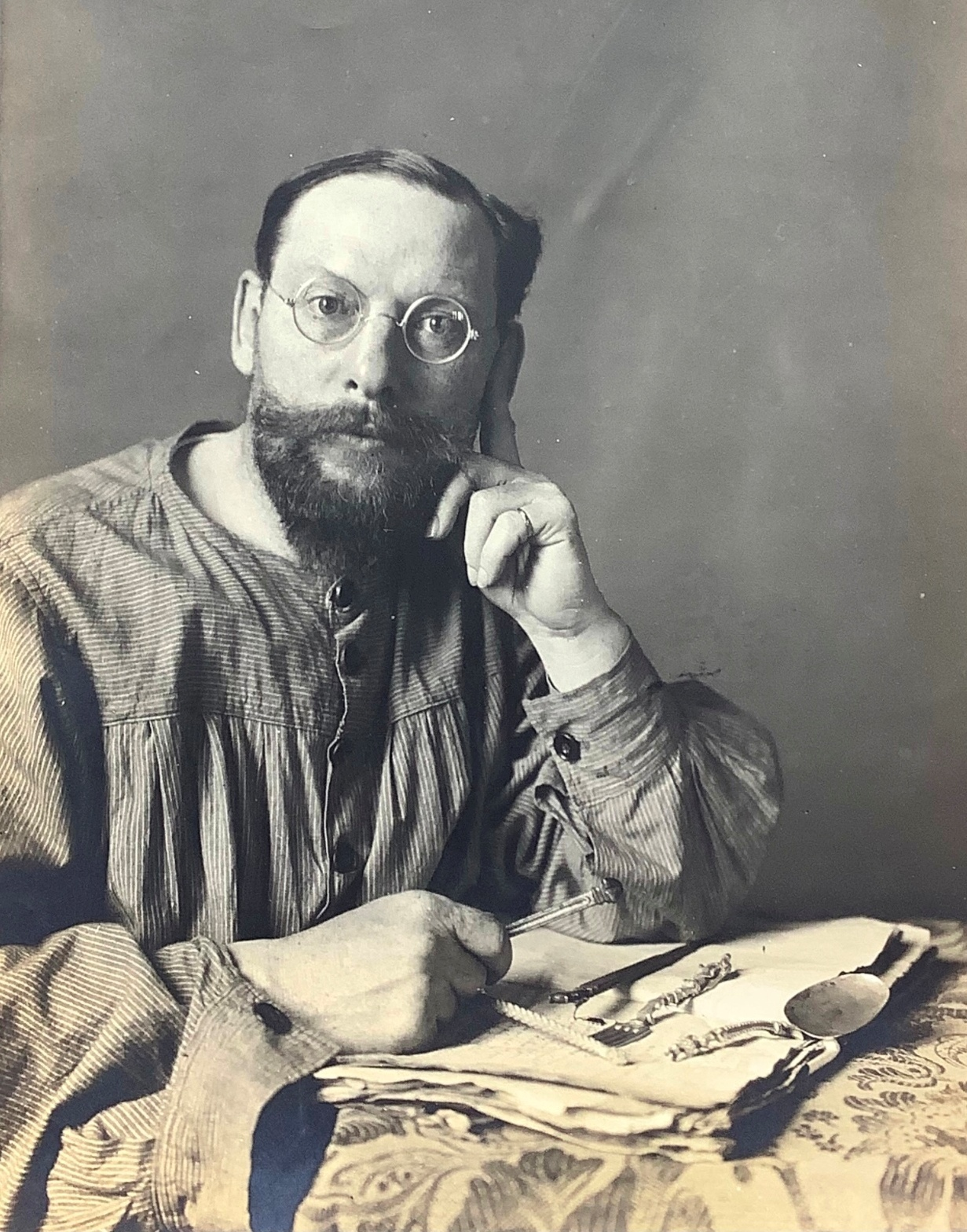
Sidney J A Churchill self-portrait

He was born in Iași, United Principalities of Moldavia and Wallachia on 1 March 1862 the son of Henry Adrian Churchill (1828–86), who was an archaeologist and British diplomat, and Marie Braniefska (?1839-1905). Three of his four brothers Harry Lionel (1860–1924), William Algernon (1865–1947), and George Percy (1876–1973) were also diplomats.

In 1908 he married Stella Myers who qualified as a doctor at Girton College, Cambridge and went on to become a writer and lecturer on health questions, and a strong supporter of the Save the Children Fund. She was also a local councillor who represented South East Southwark on the London County Council.

They had a son, George (born 1910), and a daughter, Ruth (1912–88), an architect who studied church architecture in pre-war Romania and then travelled extensively in Ethiopia. She documented her 20-year research in the local churches in Architecture of the Tigre, Ethiopia.

In 1880, at the age of 18, he joined the Persian Telegraph Department of the Indian Civil Service, where he gained an extensive knowledge of the Persian language and of Persia (modern-day Iran). He then served as British Consul in Persia (1886–94), and was in attendance on the Shah of Persia Naser ed-Din Shah during his visit to England in 1889, then Consul in Surinam and French Guiana (1894), Palermo (1898–1909), and Naples (1909–12), then Consul-General in Naples (1912–18), and Lisbon (1918–21). In 1901, he was entrusted with the last message from Queen Victoria to Prince Philippe, Duke of Orléans.

He died in Paris aged 59 on 11 January 1921 on his way to England, and is buried in the Old Cemetery of Saint-Germain-en-Laye .

== Artistic interests ==
He was a collector of Renaissance and Oriental manuscripts, and of jewels, bronzes, pictures and other antiques while in Persia and Italy. After his death his extensive personal collections were auctioned at Sotheby's, who advertised The extensive and interestesting [sic] collection of continental & Near Eastern works of art, textiles & embroideries, Italian and Sicilian objects of vertu, knives, forks, spoons, silver and enamels and the valuable and well-known collection of peasant jewellery, the property of the late Sidney J. A. Churchill, Esq.

From 1880–94, he collected Persian, Arabic, Turkish and Hebrew manuscripts for the British Museum (Vol. IV of their Persian Catalogue of Manuscripts is almost entirely devoted to the 'Churchill Manuscripts'); collected art objects in Persia for the Victoria and Albert Museum under Gen. Sir R. M. Smith, RE, KCMG, and also researched the history of gold and silver work in Italy, especially the Two Sicilies.

He wrote many books, particularly on Italian goldsmiths, in both English and Italian. He also had letters relating to artistic matters published in The Burlington Magazine.

== Selected works ==
- Clarke, Caspar Purdon; Stoeckel, J. M.; Bode, Wilhelm von; Robinson, Vincent Joseph; Gerspach, E.; Churchill, Sidney J. A.; Birdwood, George C. M.; Riegl, Alois; Scala, Arthur von (1892). Oriental Carpets. Vienna: KuK Österreichisches Handelsmuseum.
- Churchill, Sidney J. A. (1907). Bibliografia Celliniana (in Italian). Firenze: Olschki. A bibliography of Benvenuto Cellini.
- Churchill, Sidney J. A. (1907). "The Goldsmiths of Rome Under the Papal Authority; Their Statutes Hitherto Discovered, and a Bibliography" (PDF). Papers of the British School at Rome. 4: 162–226. doi:10.1017/S0068246200005122. S2CID 159851257.
- Cellini, Benvenuto (1910). Cust, Robert Henry Hobart; Churchill, Sidney J. A. (eds.). The Life of Benvenuto Cellini. London: George Bell & Sons.
- Churchill, Sidney J. A. (1912). Bibliografia Vasariana (in Italian). Firenze. A bibliography of Giorgio Vasari.
- Holme, Charles; Churchill, Sidney J. A.; Balzano, Vicenzo; Ricci, Elisa (1913). Peasant Art in Italy. London, Paris, New York: 'The Studio', Ltd.
- Churchill, Sidney J. A. (1919). Nicola da Guardiagrele, orafo abruzzese del secolo XIV-XV (in Italian). Empoli.
- Churchill, Sidney J. A. (1924). Nicola di Guardiagrele, orefice abruzzese. Notizie con una bibliografia (in Italian). Roma.
- Churchill, Sidney J. A.; Bunt, Cyril G. E. (1926). The Goldsmiths of Italy. London: Martin Hopkinson.
- "Sidney John Alexander Churchill collection of broadsides, 1608–1797, Italy". getty.edu. In the collection of the Getty Research Institute.
- Churchill, Sidney J. A. "Bibliografia Vasariana and Related Papers, c.1910–15". getty.edu. In the collection of the Getty Research Institute.
