= Bill Churchill =

Australian rules footballer

Personal information
- Full name: Bill Churchill
- Born: 20 December 1904
- Died: 30 September 1959 (aged 54)
- Original team: Yallourn

Playing career^{1}
Years	Club	Games (Goals)
1928–1929	South Melbourne	17 (19)
- ^{1} Playing statistics correct to the end of 1929.

Bill Churchill (20 December 1904 – 30 September 1959) was an Australian rules footballer who played with South Melbourne in the Victorian Football League (VFL).
