= William Algernon Churchill =

British art historian and diplomat

William Algernon Churchill (1865 – 23 December 1947) was an art historian and British diplomat.

== Family and early life ==
He was born in Algiers the son of Henry Adrian Churchill (1828–1886) who was an archaeologist and British diplomat, and Maria Braniefska (b. Warsaw 1839? – d. Pará, Brazil 1905). His second name was derived from his place of birth. Three of his four brothers, Harry Lionel (1860–1924), Sidney John Alexander (1862–1924), and George Percy (1876–1973) were also diplomats.

He married Hannah Violet Myers whose sister married his brother Sydney. They had four children: Walter (1907–1943), Peter (1909–1972), Flora (1911–1929), and Oliver (1914–1997). His three sons served in the British Armed Forces during World War II – Walter becoming an ace during the Battle of Britain while Peter and Oliver each served in the Special Operations Executive – and all three were highly decorated, each being awarded the Distinguished Service Order and also a second high-level medal of gallantry.

== Career ==
=== Diplomatic ===
In 1891 he was appointed British Vice-Consul in Mozambique, then Consul in Mozambique (1892), Pará, Amazon Provinces, Brazil (1897), Amsterdam (1906), Stockholm (1913), and finally Consul-General in Milan (1919), retiring in 1922 to live in Malvern, Worcestershire. During retirement he served as Acting Consul in Palermo for 3 months in 1928, then Acting Consul in Algiers from 1934–36.

An account of his visit to the Sugar-Loaf Mountain in Mozambique was published in 1894.

=== Academic ===
He was also an art historian with particular interest in watermarks in paper. He was author of what is still the standard reference work on early European paper and papermaking, Watermarks in Paper in Holland, England, France, etc., in the XVII and XVIII centuries, and their interconnection. First published in 1935, this book is still in print.

The extensive introduction contains inter alia an alphabetical List of Dutch papermakers, a list of French paper-makers who worked for the Dutch market, and a list of British paper-makers and mills. At the end a survey of particulars concerning the watermarks in question. The corpus of the work is systematically arranged according to motives and contains 578 fullsize reproductions of watermarks. With illustrations and 578 facsimiles of watermarks.

— Description in Amazon Books

In 1936 he donated a large collection of dated watermarks, ranging from the 15th to the 19th centuries, to the Department of Manuscripts at the British Museum.
