= Ceride-i Havadis =

First semi-official newspaper in the Ottoman Empire

Ceride-i Havadis (Journal of News) was the first semi-official newspaper in the Ottoman Empire, and was published from 1840 to 1877.

== History ==
Ceride-i Havadis was published by William Nosworthy Churchill, an Englishman who moved to Turkey aged 19 and was familiar with the Turkish language and the Ottoman Turkish script having worked as a translator at the American Consulate in Constantinople. Ceride-i Havadis published foreign news items translated by Churchill and his staff, provided by the Ottoman Government (Ottoman Imperial Printing House), wrote the news; and was the only semi-private paper in Turkey until 1860. The paper received financial support from the government and was first published on 31 July 1840. It was the first newspaper in the country to have private adverts and death notices.

To accommodate a growing circle of readers, the editors simplified the language in which the newspaper was written, gradually abandoning the more formal style which they had previously shared with the official Gazette. Ottoman statesman Said Pasha (1830–1914), was at one time editor of the Ceridé-i-Havadis.

The first privately owned Turkish newspaper was Ceride-i Havadis (Journal of News), published in 1840 by an Englishman named William N. Churchill. The content was unusually rich for its time, for it contained details of Western politics, financial news, material about controversial events such as the French Revolution, and items of cultural interest such as reports of new technology that had not yet been introduced into the Ottoman Empire. However, Churchill’s paper did not appeal to the public and was able to survive only with state support. In fact, its writers were all members of the translation bureau of the Sublime Porte, who directed communication with foreign countries and followed the foreign press.

— Orhan Koloğlu Encyclopedia of the Ottoman Empire, p. 432

After Churchill’s death in 1846 he was succeeded by his son Alfred Black who went to Sevastopol during the Crimean War to cover the fighting for English newspapers, and his reports were also published in special supplements by the Ceride-i Havadis. In 1860 Alfred Churchill also established a daily version of the newspaper, tr:Ruzname-i_Ceride-i_Havadis which was the first Turkish newspaper to be published on a daily basis during the Ottoman period. He promoted the cause of Turkish progress, and much improved the character of Turkish printing.

When the Sultan of Turkey visited England in July 1867, Alfred Black Churchill attended as the official historiographer.

The first press debate occurred between Ceride-i Havadis and Tercüman-ı Ahvâl. After the death of Churchill in 1870 aged 45, the business ran until 1887 when the papers closed.
