= Akiba Israel Wertheimer =

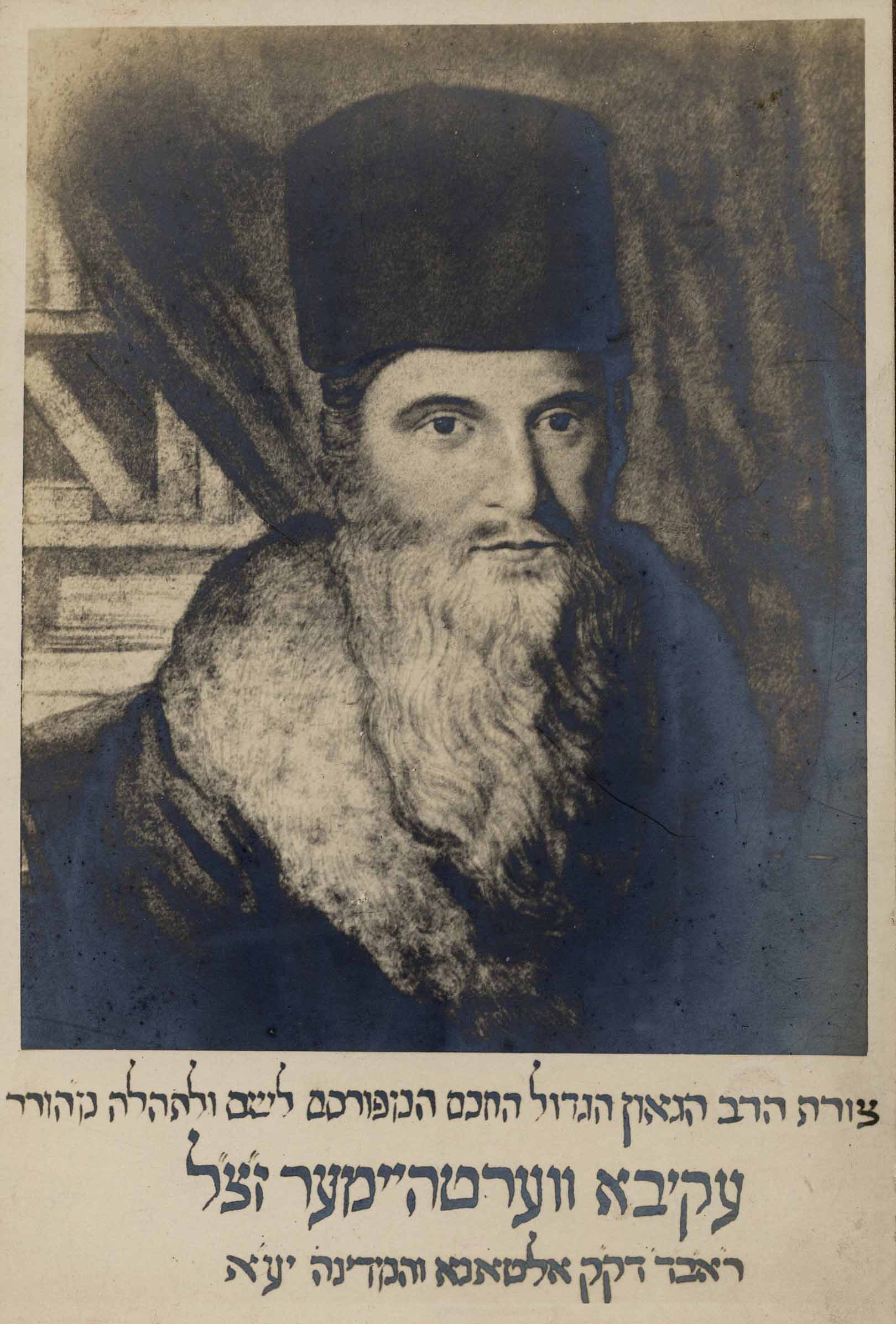
- Title: Chief Rabbi

Personal life
- Born: Jacob Viktor Wertheimer; 1778 Wrocław, Kingdom of Prussia (modern-day Poland)
- Died: 20 May 1836, age about 57 Altona, Kingdom of Denmark (modern-day Germany)
- Parent: Avigdor Wertheimer (father)

Religious life
- Religion: Judaism

Jewish leader
- Successor: Jacob Ettlinger

Akiba Israel Wertheimer (1778–1835) was the first Chief Rabbi of Altona and Schleswig-Holstein.

== Life ==
Akiba (or Ekiva or Akiva) Wertheimer was born in about 1778 in Wrocław, Prussia, where his father, Avigdor Wertheimer, was a Torah scholar. He went to the Talmudic academy of Akiba Eger in Mirosławiec.

He moved with his parents to Altona, now a suburb of Hamburg but then an independent city ruled by Denmark, where in 1805 he was a melamed (teacher in a Jewish elementary school). In 1806 he became a rabbi in Moisling and Lübeck. Due to the expulsion of the Jews in Lübeck and poverty in the Moisling Jewish community, in 1816 he moved to Altona where he remained until his death.

In 1819 he opposed the Hamburg-based reformers of Judaism and banned the use of the Jewish prayer book in the German language.

In 1823 he was appointed the first Chief Rabbi of Altona and Schleswig-Holstein. He died in Altona in 1835, and was succeeded as Chief Rabbi by Jacob Ettlinger.

== Family ==
His brother Moses Wertheimer was the father of German philosopher Constantin Brunner (born Aryeh Yehuda Wertheimer)
