= William Nosworthy Churchill =

British journalist

William Nosworthy Churchill (1796–1846) was a British-born journalist who moved to the Ottoman Empire at age 19 and caused a diplomatic incident resulting in the temporary severance of diplomatic relations between the United Kingdom and the Ottoman Empire. As an unexpected result he became the founder of the Ceride-i Havadis newspaper.

== Biography ==
He was born in London on 7 November 1796, the son of Frederick Henry Churchill (1759–1840) of Exeter and Dorothy (née Nosworthy) (1768–1846) of Crediton, Devon.

In 1815 at the age of 19 he went to the Ottoman Empire, possibly as a foreign correspondent for the English Morning Herald newspaper, and settled in Smyrna (İzmir). In 1824 he married Beatrix Belhomme (1803–1895) daughter of a French merchant, with whom he had 11 children including Alfred Black (1826–1870), the explorer and diplomat Henry Adrian (1828–1886), and the artist William. A grandson, William Sydney Churchill, was a British-Ottoman Gendarmerie officer who served in Egypt, Crete, and Turkey during the Ottoman Empire.

He later moved to Istanbul where he was known as a wood merchant.

=== Diplomatic Service ===
After working as a dragoman (interpreter) at the US Consulate, he was appointed American Vice-Consul in 1831. In 1833 he became Acting Consul and was then recommended to be Consul following the resignation of the former incumbent,. However, he was not appointed and in April 1834 was dismissed and instructed to hand over the Consulate archives and the balance of its funds. Churchill claimed that he had been defamed by a known perpetrator and asked the American President to conduct an inquiry.

=== The 'Churchill Affair' ===
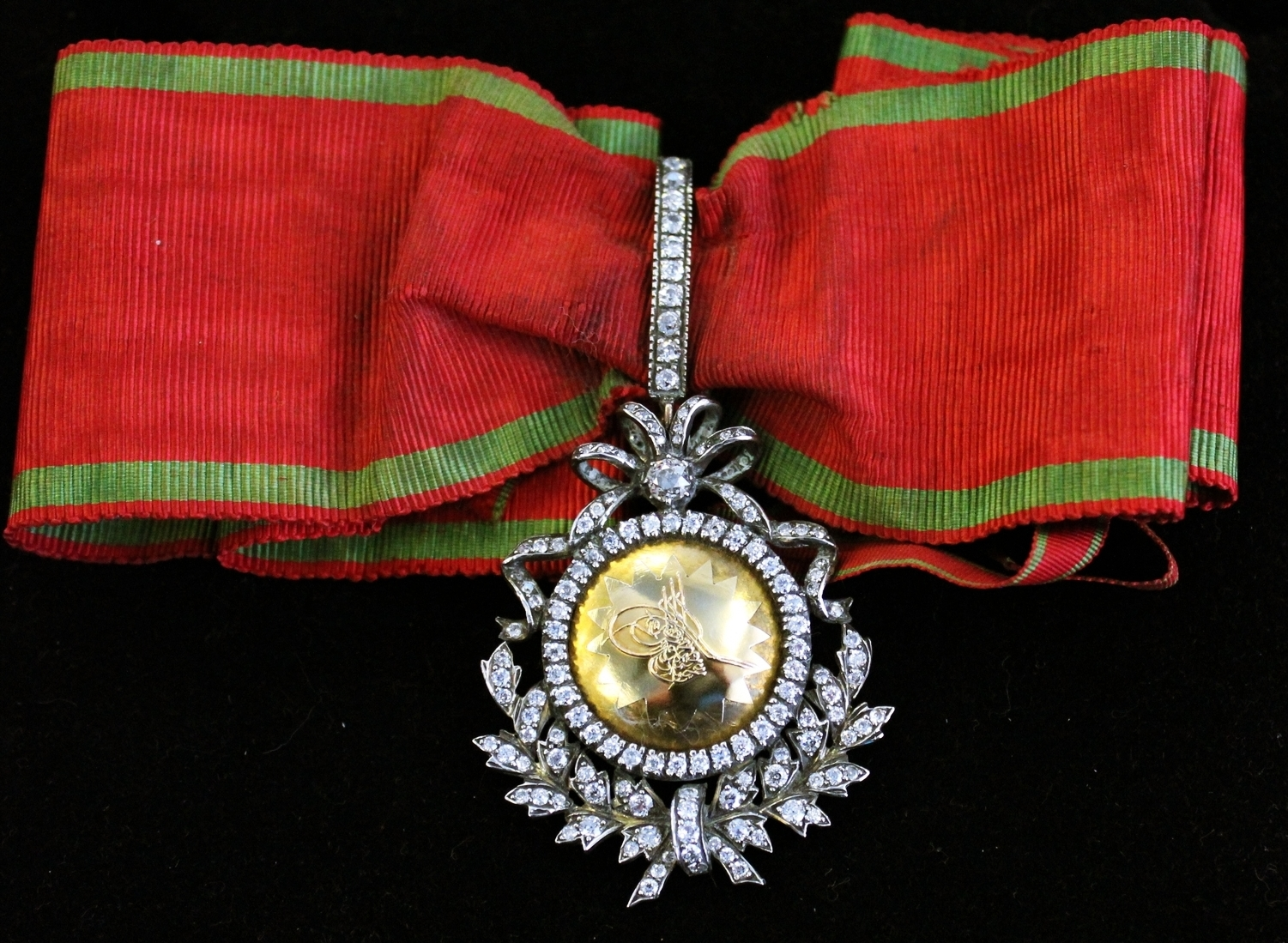
Nişan-ı İftihar of the Ottoman Empire

In 1836 while out hunting in Kadıköy, a large residential district on the Asian shore of Constantinople, he accidentally shot and wounded the son of Necati Efendi, a civil servant holding a high position in the Title Deed Office. Churchill was arrested, beaten, and imprisoned while the boy's injuries were being assessed. His release, obtained through the intervention of the British Ambassador Lord Ponsonby, caused a diplomatic incident resulting in the dismissal of Akif Pasha, the Minister of Foreign Affairs, and temporary severance of diplomatic relations between the United Kingdom and the Ottoman Empire. In compensation for his detention Churchill was handsomely compensated with the Nişan-i İftihar (Order of Glory, the second highest decoration in the Ottoman Empire), a settlement of 400,000 piastres (then a very substantial sum), and trade concessions, including the right to export 10,000 Ottoman gallons of olive oil.

=== Newspaper proprietor ===
Having worked as an interpreter, Churchill was familiar with the Turkish language and the Ottoman Turkish script and in 1840 started publishing the Ceride-i Havadis (Journal of News), a weekly newspaper which received financial support from the government. Ceride-i Havadis published foreign news items translated by Churchill and his staff, and was the first and only semi-private paper in the Ottoman Empire until 1860.

He died in Constantinople on 7 September 1846 aged 49 and was buried in the Feriköy Protestant Cemetery.

Churchill was succeeded as publisher of the Ceride-i Havadis by his son Alfred Black who went to Sevastopol during the Crimean War to cover the fighting for English newspapers; his reports were also published in special supplements to Ceride-i Havadis. In 1860 Alfred Churchill also established a daily version of the newspaper, Ruzname-i Ceride-i Havadis. It was the first Turkish newspaper to be published on a daily basis during the Ottoman period. Alfred died in 1870, aged 45, but the business continued until 1887 when both papers closed.
