= Constantin Brunner =

German Jewish philosopher

- Born: 27 August 1862; Altona, Hamburg, German Confederation
- Died: 27 August 1937 (aged 75); The Hague, Netherlands

Philosophical work
- Era: Modern philosophy
- Region: Western philosophy
- Notable ideas: the three faculties of thought (the practical, the intellectual, the analogical)

Constantin Brunner (1862–1937) was the pen-name of the German Jewish philosopher Arjeh Yehuda Wertheimer (called Leo). He was born in Altona (near Hamburg) on 27 August 1862. He came from a prominent Jewish family that had lived in the vicinity of Hamburg for generations; his grandfather, Akiba Wertheimer, was chief Rabbi of Altona and Schleswig-Holstein. Brunner studied philosophy under a number of prominent scholars, but never completed his doctorate. He established himself as a literary critic, and enjoyed a wide celebrity. In the 1890s, he withdrew from public life to devote himself to writing. He lived in Germany until 1933, when, with the rise to power of the Nazi party, he moved to The Hague, where he died on 27 August 1937.

== Doctrine ==
Central to Brunner's theory is the characterization of three different modes of mental activity:

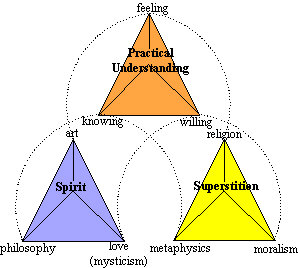
1. Practical reason, which every human possesses, and which serves one's normal needs
2. Spiritual/intellectual (geistig) thought, which rises above the relative truth residing in experience and in science, and strives toward a perception of the one eternal and absolute essence.
3. "Superstition"—pseudo-contemplation, which is the mode of contemplation of most ordinary men. Unfounded belief is a distortion of the spiritual faculty. While practical reason recognizes that the "relative" is only "relative," superstition elevates what is relative to the status of the absolute.

Each of the three modes of thought consists of three specific aspects. In the practical understanding, the aspects are feeling, knowing and willing. In spiritual life, these are modified to become art, philosophy and mysticism (love). Superstition, however, distorts these aspects of spiritual life, transforming them into religion, metaphysics and moralism.

Brunner's intention is to contrast popular thought with spiritual/intellectual thought. His work Die Lehre von den Geistigen und vom Volke is a survey of the whole of human intellectual history seen from the point of view of this doctrine.

Brunner's ultimate objective was to prepare the way for the establishment of a community centered on the life of the mind, which would in turn open the way to the expansion of democracy.

== Brunner and Judaism ==
The opposition between the spiritual and the religious is a major theme in Brunner's work. He contends that Judaism is essentially anti-religious, stating in Our Christ that "Judaism as a spiritual doctrine is the opposite of religion and a protest against it", and culminates his argument with his own translation of the Shema: "Hear O Israel, Being is our god, Being is one". He juxtaposes priestly/pharisaic/rabbinic to prophetic Judaism, stating that the latter represents the true mystical essence in opposition to the former which distorts that essence.

== Brunner and Christianity ==
For Brunner, Jesus was both a mystic and a genius, whereas Christian religion is largely a distortion of his thought.

== Brunner and Israel ==
Throughout his life, Brunner was anti-Zionist. However, there is evidence that, toward the end of his life in light of events in Europe, he was reconsidering his opposition to the founding of the state of Israel (see Assimilation und Nationalismus: ein Briefwechsel mit Constantin Brunner / Willy Aron).

== Brunner and the history of philosophy ==
According to Brunner, the authentic philosophy presented by Spinoza has its antithesis in scholasticism which reaches its highest expression in Immanuel Kant. Thus Spinoza and Kant represent opposite poles in the dialectical idealism by which Brunner organizes the whole of intellectual history.

== Brunner and science ==
Brunner maintains that the foundation of all science is the doctrine of universal all-motion. His elaboration of this doctrine has had a decisive effect on a number of medical practitioners and researchers.

== Brunner and evolution ==
Brunner's position is that the fixity of the genus is a scientific principle that needs to be preserved if meaningful work is to be undertaken with biological systems. He argued that because the theory of evolution undermined the notion of genus, it would be detrimental to practical scientific endeavor.

== Influence and relevance ==
In Confessions of a European Intellectual, Franz Schoenberner describes Brunner as "one of the more important figures" in Europe. Brunner corresponded with Walther Rathenau, Martin Buber, Gustav Landauer and Lou Andreas-Salomé. Albert Einstein read Brunner but, while appreciating his critical insight and sharing his devotion to Spinoza, rejected his philosophy, particularly where it stood opposed to Immanuel Kant.

Brunner attracted a large and devoted following among the Jewish youth in Czernowitz. The best known of his disciples in this group is the poet, Rose Ausländer.

With the Second World War, Brunner's books were burned and his devotees scattered. His German disciple Magdalena Kasch managed to save the bulk of Brunner's writing from destruction by the Nazis. In 1948, she, with the help of some of Brunner's other surviving friends, founded the "Internationaal Constantin Brunner Institut" (ICBI) in the Hague. However, there has been no major revival of interest in his work, despite the efforts of artists Yehudi Menuhin and André Breton who regarded him as a role model.

== Brunner in English ==
Brunner's works available in English include:

- Science, Spirit, Superstition (1968), which is a compilation of material from his other books. There are extracts from many of Brunner's works, including large sections from Die Lehre von den Geistigen und vom Volk, covering the doctrine and history of science. There are also important sections from Materialismus und Idealismus, a dialogue presentation of Brunner's understanding of philosophy and its history. It includes his writing on a variety of subjects.
- Our Christ (1990). A translation, with an introduction and editorial notes.
- The Tyranny of Hate: The Roots of Antisemitism (1983), an abridgement of one of Brunner's works on antisemitism.

There is relatively abundant secondary literature available in English, notably To live is to think : the thought of twentieth-century German philosopher Constantin Brunner by Hans Goetz (1995).

== Brunner in French ==
Several works by Brunner are available in French. L'amour is the first part of Brunner's work on sexual relationships. Spinoza contre Kant contains Brunner's sketch of the history of modern philosophy. Le malheur de notre peuple allemand et nos " Völkisch " (orig. 1924) warns against the dangers of Nazism. The Sorbonne has an archive of several French translations of Brunner's work by Henri Lurié. There is abundant secondary material in French as well, notably a recent work by Martin Rodan entitled Notre culture européenne, cette inconnue (Peter Lang, 2009).
