= Pauline Webb =

- Born: Pauline Mary Webb; 28 June 1927; Wembley, Middlesex, England
- Died: 27 April 2017 (aged 89); Islington, London, England
- Education: King's College London; UCL Institute of Education; Union Theological Seminary
- Occupations: Ecumenist; Author; Broadcaster
- Years active: 1949–2003

Pauline Mary Webb (28 June 1927 – 27 April 2017) was an English ecumenist, author, and broadcaster. She taught English and Religious Education at Thames Valley Grammar School, Twickenham before joining the Methodist Missionary Society (MMS) as youth education secretary and then as editor of the MMS's publications. Webb was the vice-president of the Methodist Conference from 1965 to 1966 and the Methodist Church's director of Lay Training from 1967 to 1973. She was vice-chairman of the Central Committee of the World Council of Churches between 1968 and 1979 and then became the organiser of religious broadcasting for the BBC World Service that she did from 1979 to 1987. Webb was a frequent contributor to Five to Ten, Pause for Thought, The Daily Service and Thought for the Day on BBC Radio and presented editions of the religious television programme Songs of Praise. She served as joint chair of the World Conference on Religion and Peace from 1989 to 1993 and as president of the charity Feed the Minds between 1998 and 2003.

== Early life ==
Webb was born in Wembley, Middlesex (today in North London), England, United Kingdom on 28 June 1927. She was the third and youngest daughter of the Wesleyan Methodist minister Leonard Frederick Webb and his wife Daisy Winifred (née Barnes). One of her sisters became a Roman Catholic and a Dominican nun as well as an early years education expert. Webb was brought up a Methodist, and her family moved from Wembley as a baby to Leicester, then Lancashire and Staffordshire, and she attended several schools such as Brownhills High School, Tunstall during the Second World War since her father, as with every other Methodist ministers at the time, moved appointments every three years. She was mostly influenced mainly by the years spent at Morecambe and Shaw, near Oldham, and picked up North country accent and style that she kept for her entire life. In 1945, Webb enrolled at King's College London to do an English degree. She became involved in the college's Christian Union and became a Christian. Webb graduated with a Bachelor of Arts degree with honours in 1948.

== Career ==
Following graduation, at the time, the Methodist Church did not accept ordained women, so she had a year doing a teaching diploma at the London University Institute of Education. Between 1949 and 1952, Webb taught English and Religious Education at Thames Valley Grammar School, Twickenham. After she participated part in Methodist Youth Department conferences, and challenging the department's theology, in 1952 Webb was invited to apply for the post of youth education secretary at the Methodist Missionary Society (MMS), and spent three years in the society's Missionary Education Department. She recruited Methodist youth clubs to support the MMS's activities and interesting members in giving funds to the society's work.

In 1955, Webb became editor of all the society's publications, such as the magazine The Kingdom Overseas. Her MMS responsibilities entailed extensive travelling, starting with a journey to South India in 1956 to make a film about the United Church of South India formed in 1947 by the merger of Anglican, Congregationalist, Methodist and Presbyterian denominations in the subcontinent. Webb scripted films in The Bahamas, Ceylon, Nigeria and Panama. She participated in Civil Rights marches and joined the East Harlem Protestant Church as she studied at Union Theological Seminary, New York, among one of 13 people, finishing an Master of Theology ecumenical programme in 1965.

In July 1964, Webb was appointed as the youngest vice-president of the Methodist Conference (the highest office open to a lay person) and began in the post in 1965, also serving as a member of Anglican-Methodist Negotiating Commission from 1965 to 1968. Webb was the fourth woman to hold the position. Over the next 12 months, she travelled all over the United Kingdom, preaching, speaking, dedicating new churches and often pleading for the initiation of special ministries to alcoholics, drug addicts and gamblers. After she ended her vice-presidential term, Webb became the Methodist Church's director of Lay Training and held the role from 1967 to 1973. In 1968, Webb went to the Fifth Assembly of the World Council of Churches (WCC) in Uppsala, Sweden as the Methodist representative and was elected the vice-chairman of its Central Committee, the first woman to become a senior officer. She was barred entry from South Africa by the country's government in January 1971 for her involvement in the allocation of funding for humanitarian purposes to various freedom-fighting organisations and her anti-Apartheid stance.

In 1973, Webb returned to the missionary department as area secretary with responsibility for the Caribbean, Europe, Latin America and West Africa and remained in the job until 1979. She was also appointed chairman of the British Council of Churches Race Relations Unit. When her term of office at the WCC ended in 1979, Webb remained on its executive committee and in the same year left her Methodist post. With the support of BBC Television's head of religious broadcasting Colin Morris and BBC Radio's head of religion Colin Semper, she was appointed organiser of religious broadcasting for the BBC World Service and was the first lay person to head the department in June 1979 and began working in the role that October. During Webb's tenure at Bush House, the World Service broadcast a religious version of the radio programme Desert Island Discs, with guests including Judi Dench and Terry Waite, and was moderator of the Assembly Preparation committee from 1981 to 1983. She was a frequent contributor to Five to Ten, Pause for Thought during Terry Wogan's Friday breakfast programme on BBC Radio 2 and wider global events for both The Daily Service and Thought for the Day on BBC Radio 4. Webb presented editions of the religious television programme Songs of Praise. She retired from the BBC in June 1987.

Webb continued to be involved with the WCC. She served as joint chair of the World Conference on Religion and Peace from 1989 to 1993, was a trustee of the Christian Evidence Society between 1992 and 1999, and as president of the charity Feed the Minds that distributes Christian literature to the developing world between 1998 and 2003. Webb was the author of 16 books and articles. These included Women of Our Company (1958), Women of Our Time (1960), Operation Healing: Stories of the Work of Medical Missions throughout the World, with Bible Links and Things to Do (1964), All God's Children (1965), Are We Yet Alive?: Addresses on the Mission of the Church in the Modern World (1966), Agenda for the Churches (1968), contributed to We Believe in God (1968), Salvation Today (1974), contributed to Agenda for Prophets (1980), Where Are the Women (1980), was editor of Faith and Faithfulness: Essays on Contemporary Ecumenical Themes: A Tribute to Philip A. Potter (1984), Celebrating Friendship (1986), Evidence for the Power of Prayer (1987), Candles for Advent (1989), co-edited Dictionary of the Ecumenical Movement, World Council of Churches (1991), She Flies Beyond (1994) and was editor of A Long Struggle (1994). In 2006, an autobiographical volume, World Wide Webb: Memoirs of Life in the Universal Church, was published.

== Personal life and death ==
She did not marry. As her health deteriorated, Webb moved to The Meadow Residential Care Home, Muswell Hill in 2016. She died of community-acquired pneumonia at the Whittington Hospital, Islington on 27 April 2017. Her funeral took place at Muswell Hill Methodist Church and a service of thanksgiving was held at Wesley's Chapel, London in July 2017.

== Legacy ==
Webb received honorary doctorates from the Université libre de Bruxelles, 1985, the University of Victoria in 1986, the University of Mount Saint Vincent in 1987, and the University of Birmingham in 1997. The Churches Together in Britain and Ireland awards the Pauline Webb Ecumenical Fund that presents grants to women in support women's participation in ecumenical work.
