= Hilary Wayment =

British author and historian of stained glass

Hilary Wayment OBE, FSA
- Born: 23 April 1912; London, England
- Died: 20 March 2005 (aged 92); Cambridge, England
- Education: King's College, Cambridge
- Occupation: Historian of stained glass
- Spouse: Lilah Dixon (m. 1952)
- Children: 1 son and daughter

Hilary Godwin Wayment OBE, FSA (23 April 1912 – 20 March 2005) was a British author and historian of stained glass.

== Early life ==
Wayment was born in Woolwich, in London on 23 April 1912, the son of Alfred Wayment, headmaster of the local church school. His godfather Eric Milner-White, a curate at the church of St Mary Magdalen Woolwich, was later Dean of King's College, Cambridge from 1918 to 1941, and became a strong influence on Wayment's life, leading him a near lifelong study of stained glass, particularly the windows of King's College.

His early education was at King's College School, Cambridge where he was a chorister in the college choir. He proceeded to Charterhouse School and then returned to King's College, Cambridge as an undergraduate from 1931–1935, taking a first in Part I of the Classical Tripos before reading English for Part II. He was a contemporary at King's of Oliver Churchill, with whom he formed a lifelong friendship, and their paths crossed during World War 2 in Cairo where Wayment was working from 1937–1944 and Churchill was posted to SOE Headquarters, Middle East from 1942–1945. Wayment was godfather to Churchill's eldest son, Toby.

In 1952 he married Lilah Sykes (née Dixon) and had a son and a daughter.

== Career ==
From 1937 to 1944, he served as Assistant Lecturer and then Lecturer in English at Fuad I University in Cairo, Egypt.

He published a collection of poems and stories Egypt Now: a miscellany in 1943, and translated from the French Moeurs et coutumes des fellahs by Henry Habib Ayrout (published as The Fellaheen, 1945). He also learned Arabic, translating into English the autobiography of the highly influential scholar Taha Hussein (The Stream of Days: a student at the Azhar, 1943).

In 1944, he returned to England and took up a post with the British Council, serving firstly in London, then in Cambridge from 1948–1952, in Brussels from 1952–1954, and from 1954–1959 as Director of the British Institute in Paris, and 1963–1068 in Amsterdam, and in Turkey from 1970 to 1973. These periods of residence furthered his research on 16th-century glass, and he formed friendships with other stained-glass scholars.

In 1967, King's College Chapel underwent an extensive cleaning operation for which scaffolding was erected around the building. From 1968–1969, Wayment took a sabbatical leave from his British Council post and was elected a Fellow of King's College, Cambridge to take advantage of the scaffolding to systematically study at close quarters and photograph the famous 16th-century cycle of stained glass in the Chapel, according to the precise standards of the Corpus Vitrearum Medii Aevi project. The subsequent large folio volume, The Windows of King's College Chapel, Cambridge published by the British Academy in 1972, was the first and became a standard for the Great Britain CVMA volumes, On retirement from the British Council he was elected a Fellow of Wolfson College, Cambridge from 1973–1977 to study the windows of the St Mary's Church, Fairford, in Gloucestershire, which have a close relationship to those at King's, and wrote The Stained Glass of the Church of St Mary, Fairford, Gloucestershire published in 1984.

Four years later he wrote King's College Chapel Cambridge: The Side-chapel Glass.

He died in Cambridge on 20 March 2005, aged 92.

== Bibliography ==
- —— (1944). Egypt now, a miscellany.
- —— (1972). Windows of King's College Chapel, Cambridge: Description and Commentary Supplementary Volume I. The British Academy. ISBN 978-0197259184.
- —— (1982). King's College Chapel Cambridge the Great Windows Introduction and Guide. King's College.
- —— (1984). The stained glass of the Church of St. Mary, Fairford, Gloucestershire. The Society of Antiquaries of London. ISBN 978-0500990407.
- —— (1988). King's College Chapel, Cambridge: The Side-chapel Glass. Cambridge Antiquarian Society. ISBN 978-0951359600.

=== Translations ===
- Hussein, Taha (1948). The Stream of Days. A student at the Azhar. Longmans, Green & Co.
- Ayrout, Henry H. (1981). The Fellaheen.
