= Anne Atkins =

English broadcaster/journalist/novelist

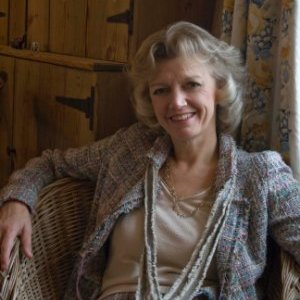
Anne Atkins

Anne Atkins is an English novelist, writer and broadcaster. The author of four novels – The Lost Child, On Our Own, A Fine and Private Place, and An Elegant Solution – as well as three books of non-fiction, she is a frequent contributor to the Today programme's Thought for the Day feature.

== Family and education ==
Anne Atkins (née Briggs) was born at Bryanston, Dorset, and moved to Cambridge at the age of three when her father, David Briggs, became headmaster of King's College School, where her mother Mary taught mathematics with Andrew Wiles and Timothy Gowers among her pupils. She went to the Perse School for Girls in Cambridge, then to the Etienne Decroux School of Mime in Paris where she studied harp under Solange Renié-Siguret. She then studied English language and Literature at Brasenose College, Oxford, after which trained at the Webber Douglas Academy of Dramatic Art in London.

Her grandfather was the hymn-writer G. W. Briggs.

Atkins is married to the Rev. Shaun Atkins, former chaplain of Bedford School, with whom she has two sons and three daughters, some of whom have continued the family's involvement in choral music.

== Career ==
=== Acting ===
While still at school Atkins played Maid Marian in the Cambridge University Footlights pantomime alongside Griff Rhys Jones and Clive Anderson. Aged 17 she directed the Clare College Cambridge May Week play, Hay Fever, and in Oxford acted with Rowan Atkinson, Richard Curtis and Philip Franks. She played the Princess of France to Hugh Laurie's King of Navarre and Stephen Fry's Don Adriano de Armado in a student production of Love's Labour's Lost at the Arts Theatre in Cambridge. Atkins started her professional acting career at St George's Shakespeare Theatre in Tufnell Park as Cordelia and the Fool in King Lear. Other Shakespearean rôles include Beatrice, Viola (twice), Olivia, Lady Macduff, Lady Capulet, Speed and Julia in Two Gentlemen of Verona, and Adriana in The Comedy of Errors. She played Amanda in Noël Coward's Private Lives at Sheringham Little Theatre, and Annie in Round and Round the Garden at the Mill at Sonning, with Sue Holderness as Ruth. Her last theatre appearance was at the National Theatre in 1991 after which her career moved increasingly into writing.

=== Journalist ===
Atkins was The Daily Telegraph's first agony aunt (1996–2000) and subsequently had a weekly column in the Daily Express about raising children, as well as two more regular columns for the Telegraph. She has also written for The Guardian, The Mail on Sunday, The Daily Mail, The Times, The Sunday Times, The Observer, The Sun, The News of the World, The Mirror, The Independent, The Sunday People and Church Times, Magazines written for include Woman's Own, Woman's Weekly, The Lady, and Country Life for which she won a Travel Writers' Award in 2007.

=== Author ===
Atkins has written four novels, The Lost Child (1994), On Our Own (1996), A Fine and Private Place (1998) and An Elegant Solution (2018), and three non-fiction works, Split Image: Male and Female after God's Likeness (1987), Child Rearing for Fun: Trust Your Instincts and Enjoy Your Children (2004), and Agony Atkins (2006).

=== Broadcaster ===
Atkins is an Anglican and has been a frequent contributor to the "Thought for the Day" feature on the BBC Radio 4 Today programme since 1996. She presented The Agony Hour series for Channel 5, Watch Your ****ing Language for Channel 4, Why People Hate Christians for BBC Radio 4 and a weekly dilemmas spot for ITV's Sunday, and frequently comments on programmes such as Question Time, Any Questions? and Today.

She has also appeared on Newsnight, This Week, Woman's Hour, Midweek, Daybreak, This Morning, Good Morning Britain, The Alan Titchmarsh Show, Five Live Breakfast, Sunday Morning Live, The Big Questions, The Sunday Programme, The Stephen Nolan Show, Jeremy Vine, Victoria Derbyshire, Haze Across Britain, News 24, The World Service, Channel 4 News, Daily Politics, The Late Late Show, PM, The World at One, You and Yours, The World Tonight, Al Jazeera, and weekly on Heroes and Villains (two series) for Anglia Television as well as many local radio stations.

On 17 March 2020, Atkins drew much comment on her Thought for the Day contribution in which she said that, after showing her father her script and kissing him goodbye, she left home to deliver her broadcast to hear on arrival that he had died minutes later.

=== Playwright ===
Atkins' first play, the comedy Lady K, was selected in 2019 by Stage Write for showcasing in London and Bedford, and subsequently chosen for the Bedfordshire Festival. It was due to have its first public rehearsed reading at the Theatre Royal Windsor in April 2020, but postponed due to the coronavirus lockdown.

=== Lyricist ===
Her first song, "He'll Soon Come to Call Me (Anthem for Mary and David)", was written for her father's funeral in March 2020 with her son Ben arranging the music, orchestration, choral arrangement and recording. It was featured on the Today Programme and published exactly a year later.

=== Blogger ===
In 2019, daily for a year and a day, Atkins wrote a blog with permission of her daughter who has suffered from severe mental illness for most of her life: the blog was written in order to publicise her daughter's suffering to get treatment for her.

=== Controversy ===
Atkins’ contributions on Radio 4’s Thought for the Day have often divided opinion: "’Thought for the Day’ was controversial years before anyone had ever heard of Anne Atkins." Atkins’ maiden ‘Thought’ in 1996 criticised the Conservative Government for a proposed change to the law regarding sex work. Shortly afterwards she commented on an upcoming celebration in Southwark Cathedral marking 20 years of the Lesbian and Gay Christian Movement:"Homophobia is reprehensible. Discriminating against people on the grounds of their sexual orientation… is indefensible. It is shocking that the armed forces can dismiss an employee" [on such grounds]. However, she went on to suggest the Church of England must return to "God’s standards of morality" or see numbers continue to fall. The broadcast prompted the Church of England's first ever complaint about the programme, as well as over 1,000 letters of support.

In the re-edition (1998) of Atkins’ first book Split Image she wrote: "I have been appalled by the self-righteousness of some in the Church who seem to think they are being biblical in expressing their hatred of homosexuality… [Jesus] might have been far more scathing today in exposing homophobia than homosexuality."

In 1998 the Press Complaints Commission ruled that an article written by her in The Sun, in which she had quoted information published by the American Psychiatric Association, that "The life expectancy of a gay man without HIV is a shocking 43 years". She apologised for the article and withdrew her comments, based on a lecture by Rev Paul Perkin, discredited nearly three decades later [Makin Review, November 2024] – after the PCC ruled that they were conjecture and non-factual.

In November 2007, Atkins defended a motion for free speech on BBC2's Newsnight, when the Oxford Union invited far-right figures David Irving and Nick Griffin to speak, saying: "When you say that the majority view is always right, I think that is a deeply dangerous and disturbing thing to say. I am not for a moment saying that I agree with David Irving or Nick Griffin, but I am saying that once you start having truth by democracy you risk silencing some of the most important prophets we have ever had."

In September 2008, she prompted complaints after offending a few listeners in Norfolk on BBC Radio 4. In a Thought for the Day broadcast about compensation culture: "No more chestnut trees lining the streets of Norwich, in case the conkers fall on your head – as if that would make a difference, in Norfolk."

In October 2012, Atkins drew both condemnation and admiration for a Daily Mail article published under the headline, "I haven't handed over a sex offender to the police – because I was told in confidence". The article referred to two abusers whom she anonymised, but one was subsequently identified as John Smyth QC, whose victims from the Iwerne camps started coming forward shortly after publication of the article, culminating in an investigation into Smyth’s activity by Cathy Newman for Channel 4 in 2017.

In the Independent newspaper, (10 February 2023) Atkins wrote: "Anything less than allowing same-sex marriage will see the Church accused of rank injustice. The Church changed the rules for divorced heterosexuals. If she is willing to change the rules for a large minority and not a tiny marginalised one, it starts to look very much like prejudice… and, yes, homophobia."

Atkins defended the Archbishop of Canterbury Justin Welby amid a storm of protest, a few hours before he resigned [BBC’s Newsnight 11 November 2024], and again the next day: ‘After my 2012 article, Peter McGrath wrote in the Guardian under the headline, "There is no worse sin than turning a blind eye to a paedophile’s activities". This is not just wrong: it is seriously unhinged. Is the sin of silence worse than paedophilia itself?’ [Independent, 12 November 2024]

== Books ==
=== Fiction ===
- The Lost Child (1994). ISBN 0-340-63245-3
- On Our Own (1996). ISBN 0-340-67218-8
- A Fine and Private Place (1998). ISBN 0-340-67221-8
- An Elegant Solution (2018). ISBN 9781912863099

=== Non-fiction ===
- Split Image: Male and Female After God’s Likeness (1987). ISBN 0-340-70986-3
- Child Rearing for Fun: Trust Your Instincts and Enjoy Your Children (2004). ISBN 0-310-25417-5
- Agony Atkins (2006). ISBN 1-85424-725-5

=== Contributions ===
- Encouraging Women (1998). ISBN 1-85345-135-5
- A Working Faith; ed. Roger Mills. Newcastle upon Tyne: Claremont (1999). ISBN 1-953327-70-2
- Why I Am Still an Anglican; edited by Caroline Chartres. Harrisburg, Pa.; London: Morehouse (2006). ISBN 0-8264-8143-4
