= Thought for the Day =

BBC Radio 4 morning radio feature

- Genre: Religious
- Running time: 2 minutes, 45 seconds
- Country of origin: United Kingdom
- Language: English
- Home station: BBC Radio 4
- Hosted by: Varies
- Audio format: Stereophonic sound
- Website: Thought for the Day homepage
- Podcast: Thought for the Day podcast

Thought for the Day is a daily scripted slot on the Today programme on BBC Radio 4 offering "reflections from a faith perspective on issues and people in the news", broadcast at around 7:45 each Monday to Saturday morning. Lasting 2 minutes and 45 seconds, it is a successor to the five-minute religious sequence Ten to Eight (1965–1970) and, before that, Lift Up Your Hearts, which was first broadcast five mornings a week on the BBC Home Service from December 1939, initially at 7:30, though soon moved to 7:47. The feature is mainly delivered by those involved in religious practice; often, these are Christian thinkers, but there have been numerous occasions where representatives of other faiths, including Judaism, Islam, Buddhism, Sikhism and Jainism, have presented Thought for the Day.

Notable contributors to the slot have included major religious figures, including Rowan Williams (former archbishop of Canterbury) and Popes Benedict XVI and Francis. British rabbis who have contributed include Chief Rabbi Jonathan Lord Sacks of the United Synagogue movement, Lionel Blue of the World Union for Progressive Judaism, and Jonathan Wittenberg, the Senior Rabbi of Masorti Judaism UK.

Other contributors include Anne Atkins, John L. Bell (Iona Community), Rhidian Brook, Tom Butler (former Bishop of Southwark), Dr Elaine Storkey (Philosopher and theologian), Canon Giles Fraser (Inclusive Church founder), Richard Lord Harries of Pentregarth, James Jones (former Bishop of Liverpool), Mona Siddiqui (Muslim professor), Michael Banner (ethicist), Indarjit Lord Singh of Wimbledon (Sikh parliamentarian), Jasvir Singh, and Canon Angela Tilby.

== Format ==
Thought for the Day contributions often follow a similar format: starting with a contemporary issue of public interest or concern, possibly drawn from the news, or from sport, the arts, science or some other area of public life as a lead-in to a spiritual or religious reflection. A report by the Christian think tank Ekklesia described the link between the topical lead-in and the spiritual reflection as usually taking one of the following forms:

1. Directional link: the contributor uses the theological content to comment on the issue in question.
2. Meditatory link: the contributor moves from the contemporary topical issue to the theological issue in a way that inspires reflection but does not try to give a moral or message about the original issue.
3. No link: this is usually done when the contributor picks a topic that is already directly spiritual or religious in nature.

Some Thought for the Day contributions can be more explicitly evangelistic while others are more personal, and others have been positively inter-religious with contributors praising faiths different from their own. Leslie Griffiths, a Christian contributor to the programme described his view of the role of faith in contributing to Thought for the Day as follows: "I'm a Christian and the essence of my Christianity gives me the angle from which I want to reflect, but it is the lens rather than the subject itself. I don’t want to talk about Christianity, I want as a Christian to talk about the news".

== Controversial broadcasts ==
Thought for the Day has included both traditionalist and more radical voices, and at times those selected to present in the slot have gone beyond providing spiritual instruction into directly criticising government policy and other social issues.

In 1971, the Methodist minister Colin Morris criticised an immigration bill put forward by the government of Ted Heath, arguing that the bill would have denied entry into Britain for not only Saints David, Andrew and George, but Jesus. This led politicians into a public debate about the advisability of the broadcast, and questions were asked in the House of Lords. The BBC dropped Morris from the list of contributors for a few months following the debate.

In 1979, a broadcast by Labour MP Tony Benn was delayed; Benn criticised the BBC for delaying the broadcast and told the press that he had been censored. It later emerged that the Conservative MP Rhodes Boyson had also been asked to prepare a script for Thought for the Day but was unable to do so. Fearing an accusation of bias in broadcasting Benn and not Boyson, they delayed Benn's broadcast until after the political conference season.

During the 1980s, increasing social problems in the inner cities led the Church of England to produce a report, Faith in the City. This laid a large portion of the blame for the social issues on the policies of the Conservative government of Margaret Thatcher. A number of Anglican bishops appeared on Thought for the Day speaking out against Thatcher's social policies including Tom Butler, Jim Thompson and Richard Harries. To protect against accusations of bias in the run-up to the 1987 General Election, David Hatch told producers: "I don't want some lefty bishop on Thought for the Day queering our pitch".

In 1990, Canon Eric James had planned to use a Thought for the Day slot to defend those protesting the poll tax, and planned to speak in positive tones of "the spiritual value of revolt". The segment was set to be broadcast on the first day of the Labour Party conference, but James resigned from the programme and told the Church Times that he had faced censorship.

In 1992, Dr Elaine Storkey in her Thought for the Day took the Saudi Arabian judiciary to task after a brief BBC World Service report that Saudi Arabia planned to hang a Christian Filipino preacher on Christmas Day. Pastor Wally Magdangal had allegedly been flogged and tortured for preaching Christianity. The item became featured on news throughout the day, and was taken up by Amnesty International and other international groups. The pastor was later released.

In 1996, the writer Anne Atkins used her slot to argue that while "homophobia is reprehensible", the Church of England was altogether too tolerant of homosexuals, condemning a service in Southwark Cathedral commemorating twenty years of the Lesbian and Gay Christian Movement as a commemoration of "20 years of gay sex", and arguing that Church was failing in its "duty to condemn sin... no doubt, we will have an adulterers' Christian Fellowship". The Church of England expressed disapproval of Atkins' views, specifically the suggestion that increasing tolerance of homosexuality in the church was the cause of a declining number of people seeking to become ordained. The BBC said that they had received a "substantial number of complaints from listeners".

== List of presenters ==
Presenters of the segment have included:

- Anne Atkins
- Reverend Dr Michael Banner
- Jonathan Bartley (Ekklesia founder)
- Vicky Beeching
- Reverend John L. Bell of the Iona Community
- Canon Dr Alan Billings
- Rabbi Lionel Blue
- Vishvapani Blomfield
- Rhidian Brook
- Bishop Tom Butler
- Akhandadhi Das (ISKCON)
- Reverend Joel Edwards
- Pope Francis
- Reverend Dr Giles Fraser
- Richard Harries, Baron Harries of Pentregarth
- Canon Eric James
- The Right Reverend Graham James
- The Right Reverend James Jones
- Hardeep Singh Kohli
- Satish Kumar
- Reverend Colin Morris
- Abdal Hakim Murad
- Cardinal Cormac Murphy-O'Connor
- Reverend Dr John Polkinghorne
- Brian Protheroe
- The Chief Rabbi Rt. Hon Lord Sacks
- Professor Mona Siddiqui
- Indarjit Singh, Baron Singh of Wimbledon
- Professor Russell Stannard
- Dr Elaine Storkey
- Canon Angela Tilby
- Reverend Dr Sam Wells
- Reverend Professor David Wilkinson
- The Right Reverend Dr Rowan Williams
- Reverend Lucy Winkett
- The Most Reverend Justin Welby, Archbishop of Canterbury
- Professor Linda Woodhead
- Jasvir Singh
- Pauline Webb

=== Pope Benedict XVI ===
After months of negotiation between the Vatican and the BBC, Pope Benedict XVI recorded a 'Christmas message especially for the UK', which was broadcast as the Thought for the Day on 24 December 2010. The broadcast followed the Pope's visit to the United Kingdom earlier in the year. In the message, he said that he was fond of Britain and asked listeners to consider Jesus's birth. The National Secular Society had criticised the BBC for giving the Pope a chance to "whitewash" the Catholic Church's record on Catholic child sexual abuse. The message was a "damp, faltering squib", commented biologist and atheist Professor Richard Dawkins on the Comment is Free webpages of The Guardian newspaper.

== Other versions and adaptations ==
The Radio 4 Thought for the Day format has been copied onto some other BBC channels, notably local radio. An example is BBC Radio Suffolk's morning show that hosts a Thought for the Day at approximately 7:30. Suffolk's programme differs from the national broadcast in that it is only 1 minute and 45 seconds long. Another difference is that it draws from a more diverse religious base, even including a regular pagan speaker. BBC Radio Leicester, too, has a daily Thought for the Day slot, now pre-recorded and broadcast at 6:45. There is a "pick of the week" re-broadcast on Sunday morning. Speakers are drawn from a wide spectrum of Christian churches, and there is substantial representation from the Muslim, Hindu, Buddhist, humanist and occasionally, Jain, communities. But here, contributors are restricted to a mere 90 seconds of broadcast time. BBC Radio 2 broadcasts a similar spot on weekday mornings called "Pause for Thought".

== Criticism ==
In 2002, 102 people put their names to a letter to the BBC Governors, drawn up by the British Humanist Association, the National Secular Society, and the Rationalist Press Association. This protested that the slot was available only to religious views. As a consequence, Professor Richard Dawkins from Oxford University was given a two-and-a-half minute slot to deliver a reflection from an atheist viewpoint, although this was not broadcast in the Thought for the Day slot itself. The Editors of the BBC World Service's version of the same strand, Pause for Thought, were not so dogmatic about secular contributions, and between 1997 and 2002, 26 five-minute secular thought pieces were recorded at Bush House with Christopher Templeton, Nicolas Walter and Anthony Grey. However, the BBC commented that it wanted to keep Thought for the Day a unique offering of a faith perspective within an otherwise entirely secular news programme. The last secular Pause for Thought was recorded for BBC World Service in 2002.

An "Alternative Thought for the Day" was offered by Unitarian minister Andrew Pakula on Boxing Day 2013, at the request of guest editor Sir Tim Berners-Lee, inventor of the World Wide Web and a Unitarian himself. Berners-Lee had wished Pakula to present his thoughts within Thought for the Day, but the BBC hierarchy said this was not appropriate, since Pakula describes himself as an atheist. Instead he was allowed to deliver his message an hour earlier, with a theistic Unitarian minister appearing in the actual Thought for the Day slot. Pakula used his message to reflect on the underlying meaning of Christmas. In a brief discussion with Today host Mishal Husain, Pakula said, "The BBC talks about not allowing people of 'no faith' to present Thought for the Day, well, what does 'no faith' mean? Here I am, I'm a minister of religion, leading a congregation talking about peace and love, and I'm considered a person of no faith because I say I'm an atheist." The controversy was covered in Britain's main broadsheets such as The Guardian, The Independent and Daily Telegraph and as far afield as Australia. From 2007 to 2025, the website Platitude of the Day offered a daily humorous, critical counter to Thought for the Day.
