= Audrey Ruth Briggs =

British cryptanalyst

Audrey Briggs
- Born: Audrey Ruth Briggs; 1920
- Died: June 2005 (aged 84–85)
- Education: Newnham College; Cambridge University
- Occupation: Cryptanalyst
- Spouse: Oliver Churchill (m. 1946)
- Children: Toby, Simon, and Flora
- Parent(s): George Briggs; Constance Barrow

Audrey Ruth Briggs (1920 – June 2005) was a cryptanalyst at Bletchley Park during World War 2.

== Background ==
Ruth Briggs was the youngest daughter of Rev. Canon George Briggs and Constance (née Barrow). She had two sisters and two brothers, one of whom, David, became Headmaster of King's College School, Cambridge.

She graduated in Modern Languages from Newnham College, Cambridge and from 1942 to 1945, as an expert in German, worked at Bletchley Park as a member of the Z Watch, which translated the decrypted messages. She worked variously in Huts 4 and 5, Block A(N), and Naval Section NS I - German Cryptography.

Briggs's work has been recognised in breaking codes used by the Axis powers during the war. Around 75% of the Bletchley Park staff were women but few female codebreakers were recognised for their work.

In 1946 she married former SOE Officer Major Oliver Churchill DSO MC in Worcester Cathedral where her father was a Canon, and she had three children, Toby, Simon, and Flora.
