= William Templeton (screenwriter) =

Scottish playwright and screenwriter (1913–1973)

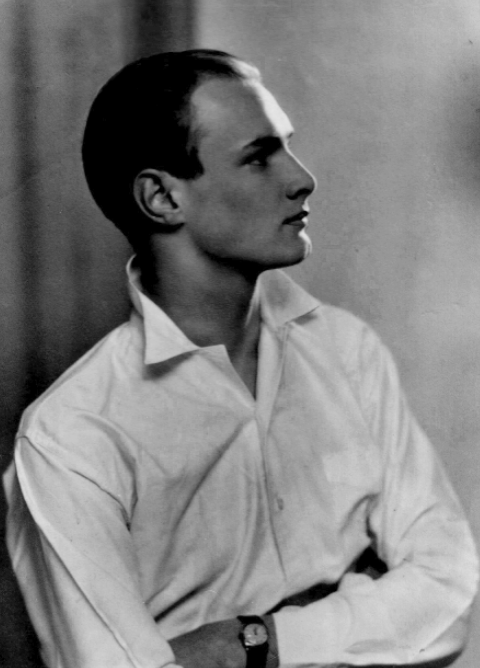
- Born: 7 June 1913; Glasgow, Scotland
- Died: 23 October 1973 (aged 60); Glasgow, Scotland
- Occupation: Playwright; screenwriter
- Spouse: Elizabeth Esterhazy (1953–61)
- Children: Christopher Templeton

William Pettigrew Templeton (7 June 1913 – 23 October 1973) was a Scottish playwright and screenwriter who contributed a string of episodic dramas for American prime time television during the Golden Age of Television in the 1950s and 1960s.

== Early life ==
At 20 Templeton wrote the one-act play The King's Spaniel, which ran at the Royal Lyceum Theatre, Edinburgh. In 1937, his first three-act play Circus Murder, was picked up and produced by Jevan Brandon Thomas at the Theatre Royal, Glasgow, then exported to London by the producer Esme Church for a run at the West End's Noël Coward Theatre (1938) under the title The Painted Smile. Theatre critic W.A. Darlington of The Daily Telegraph called it a "cleverly created illusion." After being decommissioned from the RAF after World War II, Templeton wrote several West End plays in succession including:

- (1946) Exercise Bowler (Arts then transferred to the Scala Theatre) produced by Alec Clunes
- (1948) The Ivory Tower (The Vaudeville Theatre) produced by Charles B. Cochran
- (1950) You Won't Need the Halo (Arts Theatre) produced by Alec Clunes
- (1954) Keep in a Cool Place (Saville Theatre) produced by Jevan Brandon Thomas

Sunday Times theatre critic James Agate wrote that Exercise Bowler "has an immense amount to say, is inventive, brilliantly theatrical and magnificently laid out for actors." Templeton wrote the largely anti-war play under the pseudonym 'T. Atkinson,' a generic slang name for a British soldier at the time.

== Hollywood career ==
In the late 1940s, Templeton started to move away from theatre and began writing for film and television. In 1948, he contributed dialogue to Graham Greene's script for The Fallen Idol directed by Carol Reed based on the short story by Greene. The film won the 1949 BAFTA award for best British film. In 1950, Templeton's screenplay adaptation of the book All On A Summer’s Day by HLV Fletcher became the British crime thriller Double Confession directed by Ken Annakin, starring Peter Lorre. In television, Templeton contributed to several prime time series of the period, including: The Alcoa Hour (1954–57); The Untouchables (1960); the original Adventures of Robin Hood (1957) with Richard Greene; and the Westinghouse Desilu Playhouse anthology series broadcast by CBS from 1948 to 1958 and produced by Desi Arnaz. In 1954, New York Times television critic Jack Gould wrote that Templeton's adaptation of George Orwell's dystopian novel, Nineteen Eighty-Four, "was a masterly adaptation that depicted with power and poignancy and terrifying beauty the end result of thought control."

== Personal life ==
Templeton married the Hungarian actress Elizabeth Getrude Esterházy on 22 September 1953 in Westport, Connecticut. Samuel Goldwyn Jr. was his best man. They were divorced in 1960. They had one child, Christopher. On 23 October 1973, Templeton died of cirrhosis at the age of 60 in Glasgow.

== Filmography ==
Date	Series & Film Credits	Script and Episode
1948	The Fallen Idol (Film)	Additional dialogue by William Templeton (directed by Carol Reed)
1948	The Philco Television Playhouse (TV)	Episodic scriptwriter (1948–55)
1950	Double Confession (Film)	Screenplay
1950	Her Favourite Husband (Film)	Additional dialogue by William Templeton (Produced by Carlo Ponti)
1950	Midnight Episode (Film)	Film Script by William Templeton
1950	Robert Montgomery Presents (TV)	Episodic TV scriptwriter (1950–57)
1950	Sunday Night Theatre (TV)	BBC Live Teleplay: "The Ivory Tower"
1951	The Silent Village (TV)	BBC Live Teleplay (with Audrey Hepburn)
1952	Alliance for Peace	Documentary Script by William Templeton (narrated by Edward R. Murrow)
1954	Studio One (TV Series)	"Donovan's Brain," "Cardinal Mindzenty," "Prelude to Murder," "1984", "The Eddie Chapman Story."
1954	Full Circle (Animated Film)	Commentary Writer
1955	Mr. Finley's Feelings (Animation)	Narration Script by William Templeton
1955	Matinee Theatre (TV Series)	"Madame de Treymes," "Letter of Introduction," "The Tell-Tale Heart," "The Bottle Imp" (1955–58).
1956	The Man Called X (TV Series)	"For External Use Only."
1956	Goodyear Playhouse (TV)	"A Murder is Announced" (TV script adaptation from Agatha Christie short story).
1957	Hour of Mystery (TV series)	"The Bottled Imp."
1957	Sword of Freedom (TV Series)	"The Ambassador," "Marriage of Convenience," "The Eye of the Artist," "The Marionettes," "The Reluctant Duke," "The School," "The Ship."
1957	Overseas Press Club (TV)	"The Millionth Frenchman."
1958	The Alcoa Hour (TV Series)	"Mrs Gilling and the Skyscraper," "Protege," "The Archangel Harrigen."
1959	Five Fingers (TV Series)	"The Men with Triangle Heads."
1959	The School (TV)	BBC Live Teleplay.
1959	Westinghouse Desilu Playhouse (TV)	"Murder in Gratitude," "Perilous."
1959	Men Into Space (TV)	"Is there another Civilization?" "Moonquake."
1960	The Adventures of Robin Hood (TV)	"The Pharaoh Stones."
1960	The Untouchables (TV)	"A Seat on the Fence."
1960	Churchill - The Valiant Years (TV)	"Triumph in France" (narrated by Richard Burton).
1960	The Barbara Stanwyck Show (TV)	"No-One."
1961	Whiplash (TV Series)	"The Legacy."
1961	Checkmate (TV Series)	"State of Shock."
1961	The New Breed (TV Series)	"The Torch," "Cross the Little Line," "To None a Deadly Drug."
1962	Kraft Television Theatre (TV)	"Sound of Murder," "Dead on Nine."
1962	Fair Exchange (TV Series)	"Pilot," "Unfair Exchange."
1962	Alfred Hitchcock Presents (TV Series)	"The Matched Pair."
1965	The Flying Swan (TV Series)	"Trial Run," "The Streets."
1967	The Dream World of Harrison Marks	Documentary narrative script
1967	The Little One (Radio Drama)	BBC Saturday Night Theatre
1971	The Eagle's Lament (Documentary)	W. P. Templeton as Writer/Director
1972	The Distant Drummer (TV Series)	W. P. Templeton as Director (narrated by Paul Newman, Robert Mitchum & Rod Steiger)
