= Sydney Selwyn =

British physician, medical scientist, and professor

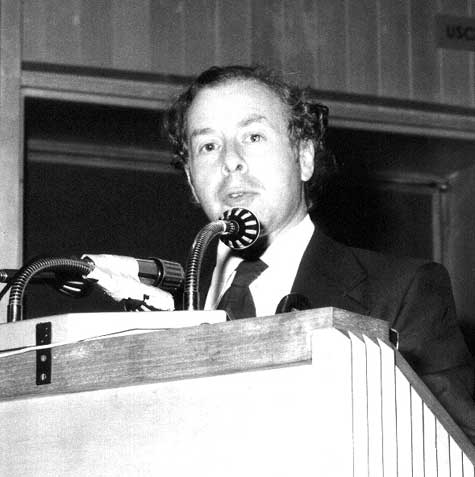
- Selwyn presenting a lecture in Italy in the early 1980s
- Born: 7 November 1934; Leeds, England
- Died: 8 November 1996 (aged 62); London, England
- Education: University of Edinburgh, University of Edinburgh Medical School
- Known for: President of the Osler Club of London (1991-1992); President of the Harveian Society of London (1991–1992)

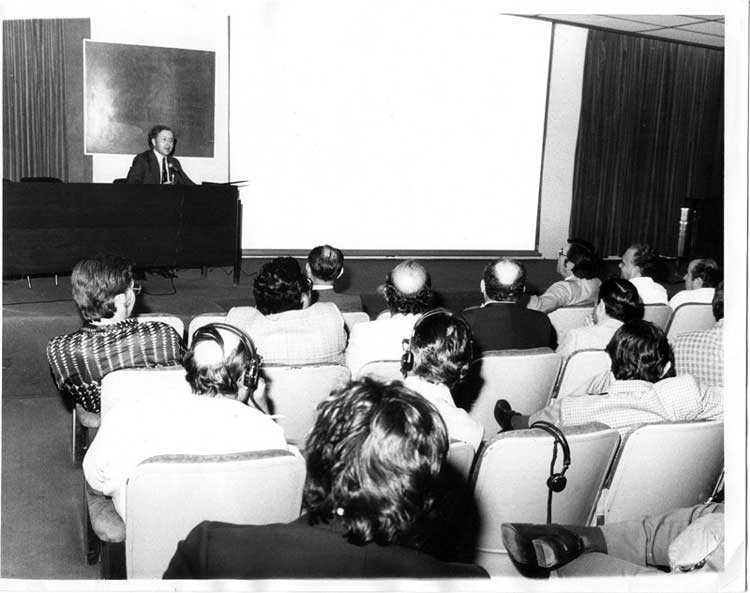
Sydney Selwyn – presenting a lecture in Mexico in 1978

Sydney Selwyn (7 November 1934 – 8 November 1996) was a British physician, medical scientist, and professor. He was a medical microbiologist with an interest in bacteriology, authority on the history of medicine, avid collector, writer, lecturer, world traveller, and occasional radio and TV broadcaster.

== Life ==
Sydney Selwyn was born in Leeds, 7 November 1934 and died in London, 8 November 1996.

Selwyn's parents owned and ran a butcher shop in Leeds and originally expected him to follow them in their trade or at least something similar. He chose instead to devote his life to science and academia. As a working-class boy growing up in England in the 1930s, and during World War II, it was a great achievement for him to win a scholarship to be educated at the prestigious and ancient Leeds Grammar School. He then went on to study at the University of Edinburgh from which he graduated with a BSc, MB ChB, and gained an MD presenting the thesis ' Infection and environmental contamination in a general hospital and in a dermatology department'.

He worked briefly (from 1959–1960) as a house physician in Edinburgh City Hospital before becoming a lecturer in bacteriology at University of Edinburgh Medical School (1961–1966). In 1967 he became one of the youngest-ever visiting professors for the World Health Organization (WHO) at Baroda University in India, as well as a WHO SE Asia medical consultant. He toured India extensively, visiting not only towns and cities but also many remote rural areas as part of his WHO project to greatly improve the standards of health and hygiene at various hospitals. He returned from India to become first Reader, then Consultant and finally Professor of Medical Microbiology at Westminster Medical School, University of London.

Whilst continuing as Professor at Westminster Medical School he also simultaneously became Professor of Medical Microbiology at Charing Cross Hospital Medical School (and was one of the founders of the then new hospital), thus running two separate departments (each with its own research and teaching teams) in two different teaching hospitals.

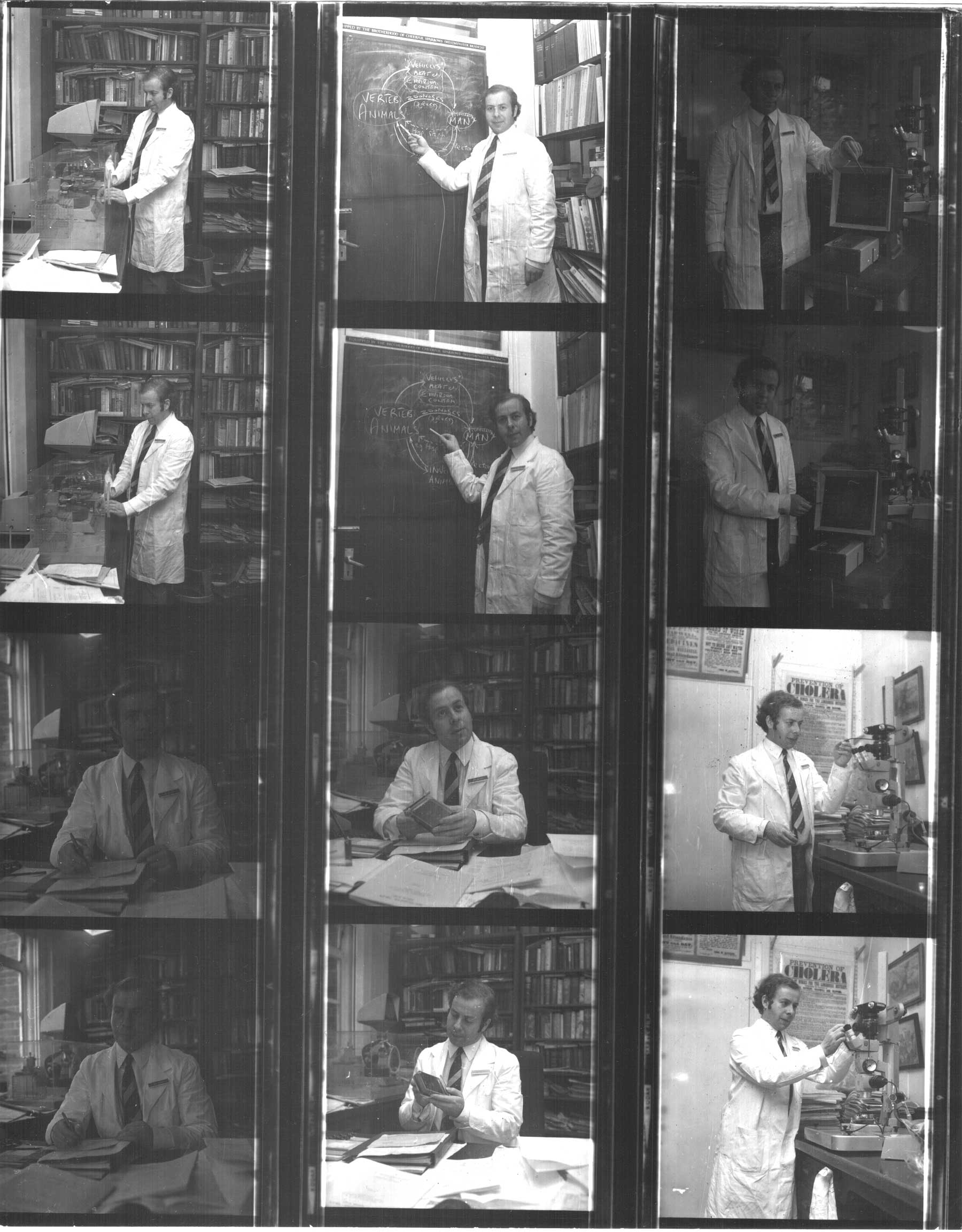
S Selwyn in one of his London offices, circa 1973

During the 1970s and 1980s he played a significant role as a pioneer in the field of bone marrow transplantation. In particular he was closely involved with the treatment of two ground-breaking cases; those of Simon Bostic and Anthony Nolan. Anthony Nolan's mother went on to found the charitable Anthony Nolan Trust.

Research in the fields of bacteriology and medical microbiology were not his only professional interests. Alongside his research activities, he also developed considerable expertise in the history and development of medicine since ancient times; he became a lecturer in that subject.

He was honorary archivist of the Royal College of Pathology, of which he was also a Fellow (FRCPath); President of the Faculty of History and Philosophy of Medicine and Pharmacy; President of the Medical Sciences Historical Society and a Liveryman of the Society of Apothecaries Worshipful, where he was also Director of the DHMSA (the Diploma of the History of Medicine at the Society of Apothecaries) — an important and popular course and diploma, to which some students even flew in from across Europe (and one from Canada) each week to attend. He led this course to new heights of popularity over the seventeen years of his tenure, until ill health forced his retirement in 1990.

He was an active member of many prestigious research and educationally based clubs and organisations, for example being president of the Osler Club of London and president of the Harveian Society of London (1991–92).

== Writer ==
He wrote, as well as co-authored, a number of books and a great number of scientific papers. One of his most accessible and delightful publications (in collaboration with his predecessor Professor R W Lacey and research assistant and colleague Mohammed Bakhtiar) was "The beta-lactam antibiotics: penicillins and cephalosporins in perspective."

== Design for a banknote ==
His diverse interests in many fields often led to involvement in unusual projects both large and small. For example, as an authority on the history of medicine he was approached by the Bank of England to suggest a medical theme for the £10 note. He not only suggested Florence Nightingale as a subject but went on to recommend they base their design on a "classic" scene of her carrying her famous lamp, which had earned her the nickname "The Lady with the Lamp," around a ward of the Military Hospital at Scutari during the Crimean War. When the Bank of England was unable to track down the particular steel engraving he had recommended he lent them a copy of the rare print from his collection.

The Florence Nightingale £10 banknote was first issued in February 1975 and proved extremely popular (leading for a while to the £10 note being nicknamed "a Flo" by some, as in "excuse me – have you got change for a Flo"). It was not withdrawn until May 1994.

== Broadcasts ==
Following several brief but popular broadcasts he gave on the dangers of licking postage stamps (particularly in countries that used crude forms of "cow gum" made from bones that could contain a worrying variety of still active diseases) he was consulted by De La Rue and the Walsall Security Printing companies who were early pioneers of self-adhesive stamps. One of the resulting projects he became involved with was the development of a set of self adhesive stamps featuring historic post boxes for Gibraltar.

He appeared a number of times as "a medical expert" on television. For example, in the 1970s he was interviewed by Frank Bough on the BBC's then popular "Nationwide" programme shown on prime family-time TV. Selwyn introduced himself on the programme as a microbiologist and bacteriologist with an interest in dermatological matters such as the flora and fauna of our skin. He went on to explain that through his researches he had come to realise most of us were using far too many chemical-based cosmetics and, as a result, disrupting the ecology of our skin. This resulted, he said, in building-up a dependence on more of these otherwise unnecessary cosmetics. He suggested that clean water and small amounts of simple soap were ample and that most of the available cosmetics and personal hygiene products being advertised were not just unnecessary but also potentially harmful especially through habitual over use.

He worked with the BBC on a number of projects which included, for example, "Horizon" documentaries and "Microbes and Men" (1974).

== Last years and final illness ==
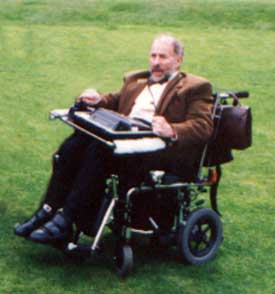
Prof Sydney Selwyn using his self-propelled, self-controlled wheelchair

Whilst barely in his 50s Professor Selwyn was diagnosed as suffering from "multiple system atrophy" (MSA), and told he might have only around 5–9 years left to live. However, even after being forced to take early retirement several years later he continued to write and publish in addition to travelling.

Despite his physical decline during his last decade or so he managed to retain not only his dignity and sense of humour but his passion for life also. Refusing to lose his mobility or become passive he instead delighted in learning to drive a new electrically driven self-propelled wheelchair. Eventually, as his condition worsened he lost his ability to speak, but, again undaunted, he learned to communicate by typing a single letter at a time on his lightwriter which had a built-in voice synthesiser.

He enjoyed a private family party in his honour for his 62nd birthday and was as full of enthusiasm and humour as ever (though of course had some difficulty in expressing it). He died peacefully at home later the following day.

== Memorials ==
A room in the laboratory block of the Charing Cross Hospital (now part of Imperial College) used for both meetings and teaching or training has been named "The Sydney Selwyn Room" in his memory. His photograph and a plaque summarising his contribution to the hospital is displayed on the wall.

Each year "The Selwyn Prize" is awarded by The Faculty of History And Philosophy of Medicine and Pharmacy at the historic premises of the Worshipful Society of Apothecaries in London to the best candidate from the previous year in the examination for the Diploma in the Ethics and Philosophy of Healthcare (Philosophy of Medicine). Receiving this prize, which is usually presented at the John Locke Lecture, is an impressive achievement as the standard and quality of candidates entering the examination is generally very high. (Since 2018, the prize has become incorporated into the annual Sydney Selwyn Eponymous Lecture, with the best student essayist of the year giving the first lecture, and the runner-up presenting the next lecture of the evening. The lectures are online and broadcast worldwide).

The winner of the 2021 Sydney Selwyn Lecture was Dr Lotte Elton. With Dr Deniz Kaya & Dr Andrew Nanapragasam - both Highly Commended

Previous prize winners are:

- 2020 - Dr Mary Fletcher
- 2019 - Dr Sara Dahlen
- 2018 - Dr Tina Matthews
- 2016 - Daniel Di Francesco
- 2012 - Miss Evelyn Brown
- 2010 - Dr Margaret Baker
- 2009 – Christopher Mark Crawshaw
- 2008 – Dr. Katherine Elen Catford
- 2007 – Michael Trent Herdman
- 2006 – Paul Bingham & Edith Rom
- 2005 – Caroline Bagley & Ben Whitelaw
- 2004 – Robert Ali

== See also ==
- MSA (Multiple system Atrophy)
