= Eric Milner-White =

British Anglican priest, academic and military chaplain

The Very Reverend Eric Milner-White OGS CBE DSO
- Dean of York
- Church: Church of England
- Diocese: York
- In office: 1941 to 1963
- Predecessor: Herbert Bate
- Successor: Alan Richardson

Orders
- Ordination: 1908 (deacon); 1909 (priest)

Personal details
- Born: Eric Milner Milner-White; 23 April 1884
- Died: 15 June 1963 (aged 79)
- Denomination: Anglicanism
- Education: Harrow School
- Alma mater: King's College, Cambridge; Cuddesdon College

Eric Milner Milner-White, OGS, CBE, DSO (23 April 1884 – 15 June 1963) was a British Anglican priest, academic, and decorated military chaplain. He was a founder of the Oratory of the Good Shepherd, an Anglican dispersed community, and served as its superior between 1923 and 1938. From 1941 to 1963, he was the Dean of York in the Church of England.

== Early life and education ==
Milner-White was the son of Henry Milner-White (a barrister and company chairman) and his wife Kathleen Lucy (née Meeres), later Sir Henry and Lady Milner-White. He was educated at Harrow School before going to King's College, Cambridge in 1903. He won a scholarship to Cambridge to read history and graduated in 1906 with a double-first and as the recipient of the Lightfoot Scholarship.

== Dean of King's College, Cambridge ==
After theological training at Cuddesdon College in 1907, Milner-White was ordained deacon in 1908 and priest in 1909 (at Southwark Cathedral). He served curacies at St Paul's Church, Newington (1908–09) and St Mary Magdalen Woolwich (1909–12) before returning to King's College as chaplain in 1912. He was also appointed a lecturer in history at Corpus Christi College, Cambridge at the same time. He then served as an army chaplain during the First World War on both the Western Front and in the Italian Campaign. He was appointed senior chaplain to 7th Infantry Division on 15 February 1917 (with temporary promotion to Chaplain to the Forces, 3rd Class) For his service during this period he was Mentioned in Despatches on 24 December 1917 and awarded the Distinguished Service Order (DSO) in the 1918 New Year Honours. He resigned his commission on 5 January 1918 and returned to Cambridge. Upon returning he was made the Dean and a Fellow of King's College. He was a founder of the Oratory of the Good Shepherd and also the order's superior from 1923 to 1938. He was re-appointed as an honorary chaplain to the armed forces, 3rd class, on 1 September 1921.

During his time at King's College, Milner-White introduced the Service of Nine Lessons and Carols. This was first broadcast in 1928 and has now become a major part of the BBC's Christmas schedule. Milner-White was also instrumental in inspiring the composer Herbert Howells to write his Collegium Regale service settings when he challenged Howells to write music for King's College as part of a bet in 1941. Howells remarked that his composition was "the only Te Deum to be born of a decanal bet". The settings have since become a well known part of the Anglican church music repertoire.

== Dean of York ==
Milner-White remained at King's until 1941, when he was appointed Dean of York. During his time as dean, he directed the replacement of many of York Minster's windows and undertook a great deal of writing on liturgical matters, for example My God My Glory (1954). He served on various national committees and served on the advisory council of the Victoria and Albert Museum from 1944 to 1959 due to his interest in stained-glass windows. He also became provost of the northern section of the Woodard Corporation, a charity which runs a number of private schools with a strong Christian ethos and, from 1948 to 1962, was amongst those who produced the New English Bible.

A variety of Milner-White's written papers are held at the King's College Archive Centre at the University of Cambridge, having been presented to the university in 1982 by Milner-White's "literary executor", the Revd P. N. Pare. Other items have since been added to the collection.

He was an avid collector of ceramics.

Milner-White was made an honorary freeman of the Worshipful Company of Glaziers in 1948. appointed a Commander of the Order of the British Empire (CBE) in the 1952 Queen's Birthday Honours, The same year he was also awarded a Lambeth Doctorate of Divinity. He was also awarded an honorary Doctor of Letters (DLitt) in 1962 by the University of Leeds.

Milner-White died of cancer in the deanery of York Minster on 15 June 1963.

Since his death, a court of student accommodation at the University of York's Vanbrugh College have been named after him.

He was godfather to the historian of stained glass Hilary Wayment.

== Works ==
- The Book of Hugh and Nancy (Macmillan, 1938) with Eleanor Shipley Duckett
- Daily Prayer (Oxford University Press, 1942) with G. W. Briggs
- A Procession of Passion Prayers (SPCK, 1950)
- After the Third Collect (Mowbray, 1952)
- My God, My Glory: Aspirations, Acts and Prayers on the Desire of God (SPCK, 1954)
