= Lightwriter =

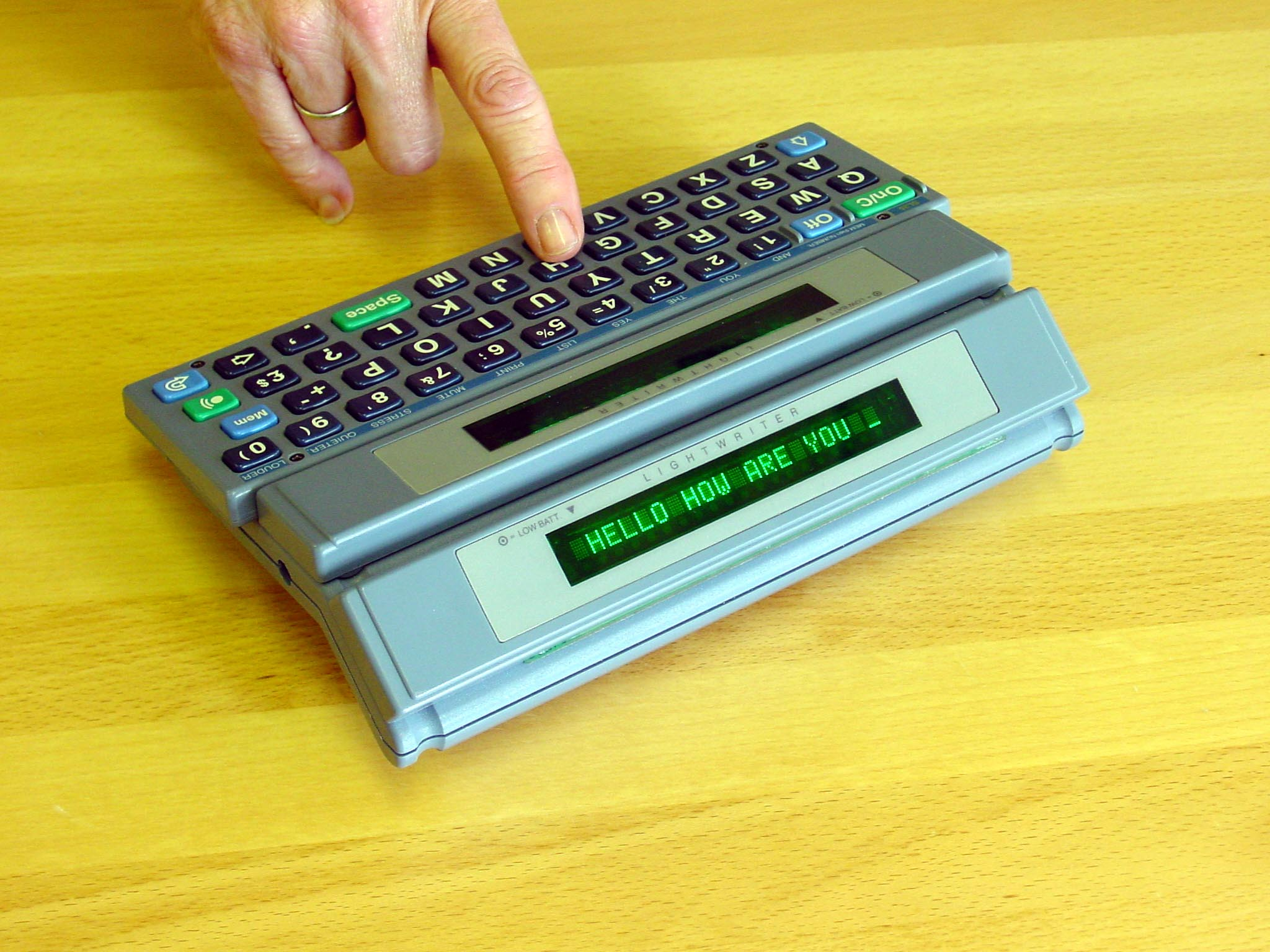
SL35 Lightwriter, manufactured from 1994 to 2008

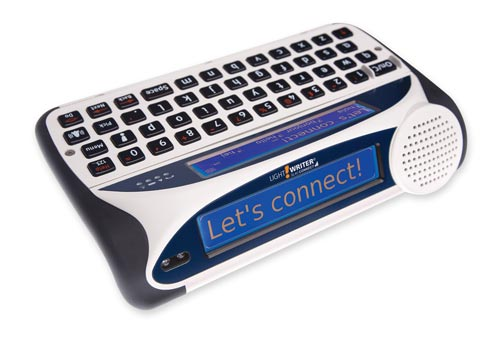
SL40 Lightwriter, manufactured from 2008

Lightwriters are a type of speech-generating device. The person who cannot speak types a message on the keyboard, and this message is displayed on two displays, one facing the user and a second outfacing display facing the communication partner or partners. A speech synthesiser is also used to provide speech output, and some models offer the facility to connect to a printer to provide printed output.

For those unable to use a keyboard, some Lightwriter models provide an on-screen keyboard that can be operated with a switch using scanning technology, with word prediction to minimize keystrokes.

The SL40 model includes a built-in mobile phone for text messaging and voice calls, where synthesized speech is transmitted to the call recipient, and incoming messages are spoken aloud through the device's loudspeaker.

Lightwriter is the brand name of Abilia. Lightwriters are available in a wide range of European languages.

== History ==
In 1969 Toby Churchill was working in France when he fell ill after swimming in a polluted lake. The doctors initially believed he had sunstroke and that the symptoms would soon pass, but became perplexed as he began to deteriorate rapidly and decided to get him back to England as quickly as possible for further treatment, and he was transferred to Addenbrookes Hospital in Cambridge where doctors could not decide whether the problem was neurological or vascular, and their diagnostic tools were limited since this was before the days of CT and MRI scanners which nowadays can look inside someone's body non-invasively.

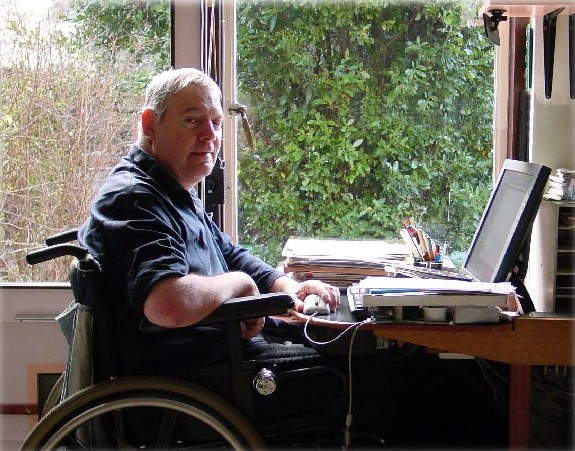
Toby Churchill in 2004

Within a few days the only voluntary movement Toby had left was an eyeblink, all other physical movement and speech being frozen. He was then in a state of ‘locked-in syndrome’, where he was perfectly aware of everything that was said to him but unable to respond, a condition eloquently described by Jean-Dominique Bauby in his book The Diving Bell and the Butterfly. Toby's family and friends had to quickly learn new communication techniques: the use of ‘closed’ questions (ones to which only a “yes” or “no” reply is required - with 1 eyeblink for “yes” or 2 eyeblinks blinks for “no”), and using an alphabet board with auditory scanning “first row?, second row? etc” until Toby blinked to select that row, and the same for each letter across the row. It was a tedious process but all that was available at that time.

Gradually, some movement returned to his left hand and arm, and a little to his legs, so he was no longer bed-bound and after a few months was transferred to Stoke Mandeville Hospital (National Spinal Injury Unit) for further physiotherapy and rehabilitation and was there introduced to the early POSSUM Row/Column scanner. While this was less tiring for the communication partner, it was not portable and became unnecessarily slow after Toby had regained hand movement and the ability to type. Toby then quickly put his engineering skills into practice to design a portable communication aid - a typewriter which instead of typing on paper, typed the message on a display, and this was then logically named the Lightwriter. Toby had no plans at that time to make more than just for himself but, as he met other people in a similar position, realised that there was a demand for them and started to manufacture them for other people, founding the Company in 1973.

== Users ==
Lightwriters are text-to-speech devices and so require some degree of literacy.

Lightwriters are used by many people with acquired speech loss following laryngectomy, tracheostomy, stroke, head injury, or with progressive neurological diseases such as motor neurone disease (also known as amyotropic lateral sclerosis or ALS), Parkinson's disease, multiple sclerosis (MS) or Huntington's chorea.

Lightwriters are also used by people with congenital speech loss with conditions such as cerebral palsy after literacy has been gained.

Diane Pretty was a British woman diagnosed with Motor Neurone Disease who attempted to change British law so she could end her own life with the assistance of her husband without it being classed as assisted suicide, which is illegal in the United Kingdom. Pretty went to the House of Lords and the European Court on Human Rights using her Lightwriter to argue her case, but was unsuccessful.

Other notable users include Professor Sydney Selwyn and comedian Lee Ridley

== In fiction ==
In the 1998 film The Theory of Flight starring Kenneth Branagh and Helena Bonham Carter, Bonham Carter's character, a young woman with motor neuron disease, uses a Lightwriter to communicate. In the 2001 episode of the TV sitcom "Becker" Dr Becker (Ted Danson) obtains a Lightwriter for his patient Joe Willike (Tom Poston) who is unable to speak due to advancing ALS.

== See also ==
- Augmentative and alternative communication
- Speech synthesis
- Switch access scanning
