= Feed the Minds =

Cristian international charity

Feed the Minds is an ecumenical Christian international development charity that supports the most marginalised individuals and communities around the world. Its vision is "A world in which all people everywhere have the opportunity to live life in all its fullness", and it works towards this vision through its Education for Change programme and Overseas Book Service.

In 2011/12 Feed the Minds changed the lives of 100,000 people through its Education for Change programme, and supported churches in development by sending more than 3,000 quality used books to 126 theological colleges.

In January 2025, it was announced that Feed The Minds will be closing. The organization will formally cease operations on 30 April 2025.

== Campaigns ==
The Lunches for Life campaign, launched in 2010, invites followers to hold food based fundraising events. The campaign runs in September to coincide with International Literacy Day (on 8 September). So far, it has raised more than £4,000 which has contributed to running projects on the Education for Change program.

== Organisational values ==
The organisations values are:

- Partnership :

Requiring Feed the Minds to work in partnership rather than alone with an aim to achieve genuine exchange of resources and support.

- Creativity:

Committed to encouraging indigenous creativity and local writing. Projects should be designed by the communities they are intended to serve and should reflect understanding of and respect for the rich diversity of cultures worldwide.

- Integrity:

Committed to improving efficiency. Feed the Minds strives to be trustworthy and honest in their operations and decision-making.

- Diversity: Feed the Minds works with partners of all faiths and none, and strives to support a wide range of projects in different countries.

== Organisational Approach ==
Literacy has been at the heart of the work of Feed the Minds throughout its history and is also acknowledged in the Millennium Development Goals as an essential aspect of the commitment to Education For All.

== Publications ==
In 2011, in partnership with the Population Council in Kenya, Feed the Minds conducted some research into Female Genital Mutilation (FGM) in Kenya. The research looked at how an Alternative Rite of Passage, which involves education and a celebration but no cutting, could protect young girls at the same time as protecting cultural traditions.

In 2011 "Storytelling: A tool for promoting peace and literacy" was produced to support a project called Trauma Healing Through Storytelling, Reading and Writing, funded by Feed the Minds in partnership with the Peacebuilding, Healing and Reconciliation Programme (PHARP) and the Sudan Evangelical Mission (SEM). Feed the Minds believe storytelling is a particularly powerful literacy and empowerment tool.

== Volunteering and Regional Groups ==
Feed the Minds has a network of six regional groups in England. They organise social and fundraising events across the British Isles.

In 2011/2012 alone these regional groups raised £29, 585. Feed the Minds have also estimated that groups such as their Salisbury committee have sold in excess of 100,000 books over the last few decades.
