= Colin Morris (Methodist minister) =

British Christian minister (1929–2018)

- Born: 13 January 1929; Bolton, England
- Died: 20 May 2018 (aged 89)

Ecclesiastical career
- Church: Methodist Church of Great Britain

President of the Methodist Conference
- In office 1976–1977
- Vice President: Dr Cyril J Bennett
- Preceded by: Alfred Raymond George
- Succeeded by: B. Arthur Shaw

Colin Manley Morris (13 January 1929 – 20 May 2018) was an English Methodist minister, author, and broadcaster. Born into a mining family in a village near Bolton, after his ordination he served the Methodist Church in Northern Rhodesia for fifteen years. He stood out for racial integration within the church, became a close friend of the leader of the independence movement, Kenneth Kaunda, and was closely involved in the formation of the United Church in Zambia soon after the country became independent. He always espoused an explicitly anti-racist and socialist position and argued that it represents the "authentic spirit" of Christianity. He died on 20 May 2018 at the age of 89. After returning from Zambia, Morris occupied prominent positions in British Methodism, becoming first the superintendent minister of Wesley's Chapel in London, and subsequently General Secretary of the Church's Overseas Division. He was President of the Methodist Conference, elected in July 1976 and serving for the customary year term.

From early in his career, Morris was a regular speaker on the Thought for the Day segment of the BBC Radio 4 morning programme Today, with a radical perspective and an instantly recognisable voice. For a period in 1971 he withdrew from the programme in protest against alleged representations by the Conservative Party Whips against his criticism on the programme of the party's immigration policy as un-Christian, an incident that caused questions to be asked in the House of Lords. He was still contributing to Thought for the Day in 2010.

In 1978 Morris left the ordinary work of the Methodist ministry to work for the BBC, as head of TV Religious Programmes. He subsequently held the posts of Head of Religious Broadcasting, Special Advisor to the Director-General, and Controller of BBC Northern Ireland. After retiring from management within the BBC he continued to broadcast, presenting numerous religious programmes. From 1991 to 1996 he served as Director of the Centre for Religious Communication in Oxford.

As well as his broadcasting work, Morris was a prolific author of books and pamphlets. Most of his published work reflected either his experience as a white missionary in black Africa, or as an ordained minister working as a professional broadcaster.

== Published books ==
- Out of Africa’s Crucible. Sermons from Central Africa. Lutterworth, 1960.
- Black government? A discussion between Colin Morris and Kenneth Kaunda. United Society for Christian Literature, 1960.
- The Hour after Midnight. A missionary’s experiences of the racial and political struggle in Northern Rhodesia. Longman, 1961.
- Church and Challenge in a New Africa: Political sermons. Epworth Press, 1964.
- Include me out! Confessions of an ecclesiastical coward. Epworth Press, 1968; Fontana, 1975.
- Unyoung, uncoloured, unpoor. Epworth Press, 1969.
- Mankind my church. Hodder & Stoughton, 1971.
- What the papers didn’t say, and other broadcast talks. Epworth Press, 1971.
- Epistles to the Apostle: Tarsus-please forward. Hodder & Stoughton, 1972.
- The hammer of the Lord: Sign of hope. Epworth Press, 1973.
- Word and the Words : The Voigt Lectures on Preaching. Epworth Press, 1975.
- Bugles in the afternoon. Epworth Press, 1977.
- Get through till nightfall. Fount, 1979.
- God-in-a-box: Christian strategy in the television age. Hodder & Stoughton, 1984.
- A week in the life of God. Epworth Press, 1986.
- Wrestling with an angel. Collins Fount, 1990.
- God in the shower: thoughts from Today. Macmillan, 2002.
- Things shaken - things unshaken : reflections on faith and terror. Epworth Press, 2006.
- Bullet point beliefs: The best of Colin Morris (Edited by Rosemary Foxcroft). Canterbury Press, 2007

== Works about Colin Morris ==
- A Humanist in Africa. Letters to Colin M. Morris from Kenneth D. Kaunda.. Longman, 1966.
- Charlton, L. Spark in the stubble: Dr Morris of Zambia. Epworth Press, 1969.
