= G. W. Briggs =

Anglican clergyman and hymnwriter (1875–1959)

George Wallace Briggs (14 December 1875 – 30 December 1959) was an English hymn writer and Anglican clergyman.

== Career ==
Briggs was born on 14 December 1875, in Nottingham, to George Briggs and Betsy Ann Hardstaff, and educated at Loughborough Grammar School and Emmanuel College, Cambridge. He served as a padre in the Royal Navy from January 1902, before becoming Vicar of St Andrew's Church, Norwich, in 1909. In 1918, he became Rector of All Saints Church, Loughborough. Between 1927 and 1934, he was Canon of Leicester Cathedral and from 1934 until his retirement in 1956 he served as Canon of Worcester Cathedral.

His most famous hymn is "God Has Spoken by His Prophets" as set to the tune written for Ode to Joy by Beethoven. He also wrote Loughborough Grammar School's school hymn "Our Father by whose servant(s)", which has also been adopted as a school hymn by other schools. The servant in LGS's case was Thomas Burton, and the "Five Hundred Years Enduring" verse 2 (originally "Four Hundred Years Enduring") is unique to the Loughborough Schools Foundation. He also wrote the college hymn for Loughborough College of Technology, which would later become Loughborough University. He died on 30 December 1959, aged 84.

Owing to his writing of their school hymn, there is a room within Loughborough Schools Foundation's Music Department named after him.

== Family ==
He married Constance Emily T Barrow in 1909, and had five children: Margaret, Joan, David, Ruth and Stephen.

== List of hymns ==
- "A Call to the Free Nations"
- "A Hymn of Freedom"
- "Christ is the world's true Light"
- "Come, risen Lord, and deign to be our guest"
- "God Has Spoken by His Prophets"
- "God, you have given us power to sound"
- "Lord of All Majesty and Might"
- "Our Father by Whose Servant(s)"
- "Now is eternal life if ris'n with Christ we stand"
- "Chamar"

== Bibliography ==
- Daily Prayer co-edited with Eric Milner-White, Oxford University Press, 1942
