= Toby Churchill =

British entrepreneur

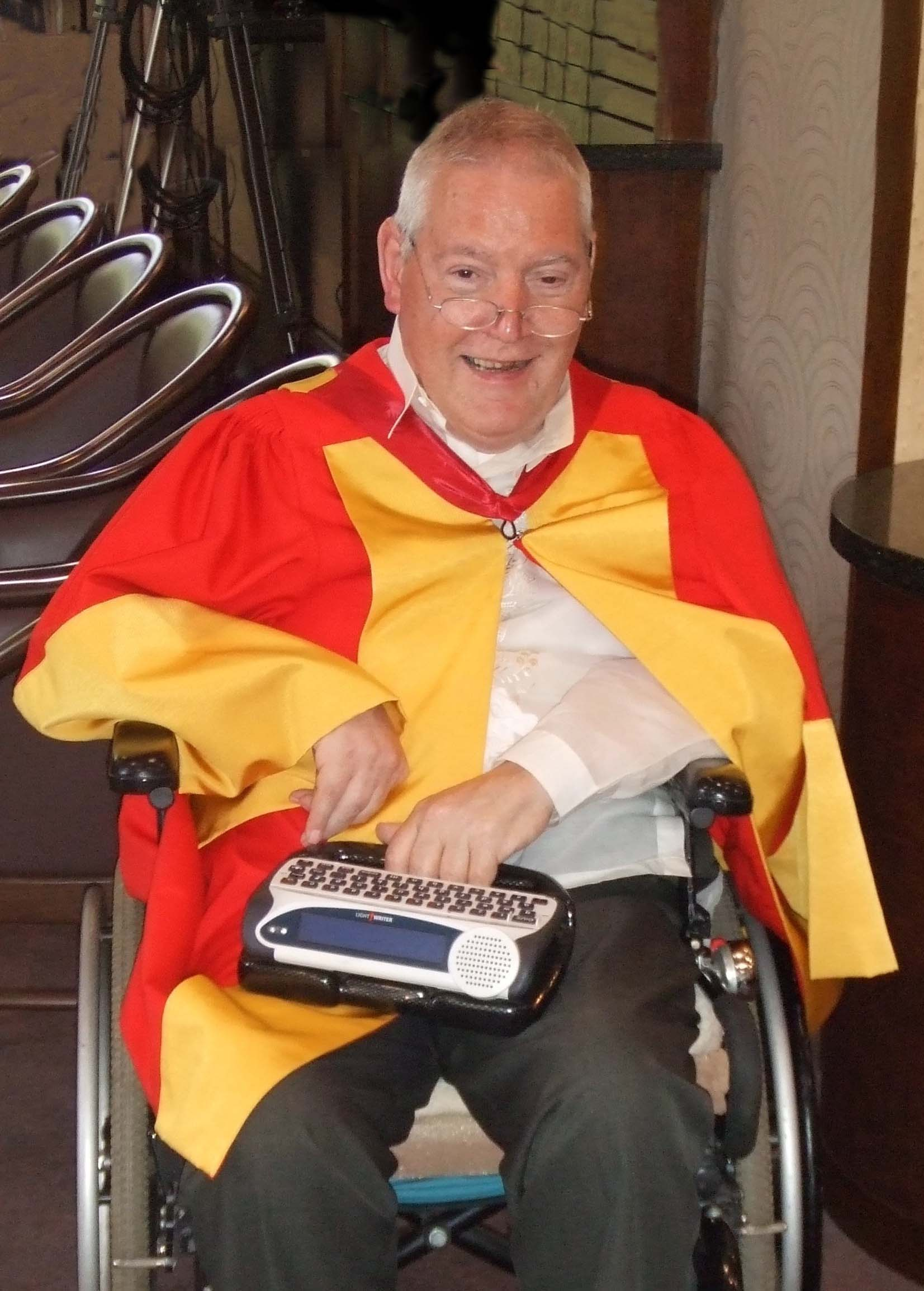
Toby receiving an honorary doctorate from the University of Bath in 2010

Toby Churchill DEng FRSA (born 29 June 1947) is a disabled British entrepreneur. He founded a company manufacturing communication aids for people who cannot speak.

== Biography ==
He is the eldest son of Oliver Churchill and Ruth (née Briggs). He was born in Cambridge where he has lived for all of his life. He was educated at The Perse School, Cambridge, and the University of Bath where he studied engineering with French.

In 1968, aged 21, Toby contracted encephalitis from swimming in a polluted river while working in France as part of his degree course. Within 24 hours he became totally paralysed and without speech. Doctors initially diagnosed his lost speech as a sunstroke but subsequently realised it was more serious. Then French President, General de Gaulle, heard that someone with the surname Churchill had been taken seriously ill and, mistakenly assuming Toby was related to Sir Winston Churchill, arranged for him to be flown back to Cambridge airport in his private jet. Toby spent six months in Addenbrooke's Hospital, Cambridge in a locked-in condition and was subsequently transferred to Stoke Mandeville Hospital for rehabilitation, where he spent a further nine months.

Dissatisfied with the rudimentary communication aids then available for people who cannot speak, he designed the first Lightwriter communication aid for his own use and, after meeting other people with similar needs, started to manufacture them. He set up Toby Churchill Limited in 1973 to manufacture portable text-based communication aids.

The company won a number of awards including a British Design Award in 1969, a Department of Trade and Industry Languages for Export Award in 1996, and the Queen's Award for Export in 1995 and 1996.

Soon after partially recovering from his disabilities he designed an adapted car for his own use, able to be controlled entirely by his left hand.

His inventions appeared four times on Tomorrow's World during the 1970s.

He also set up a wine importing business, a property rental business in France, a super car rental business, and was consulted by Cambridge City Council over the design of a public toilet.

He is a Fellow of the Royal Society of Arts.

He was awarded an honorary Doctor of Engineering degree (DEng) from the University of Bath in 2010.
