= David Briggs (headmaster) =

English educator (1917-2020)

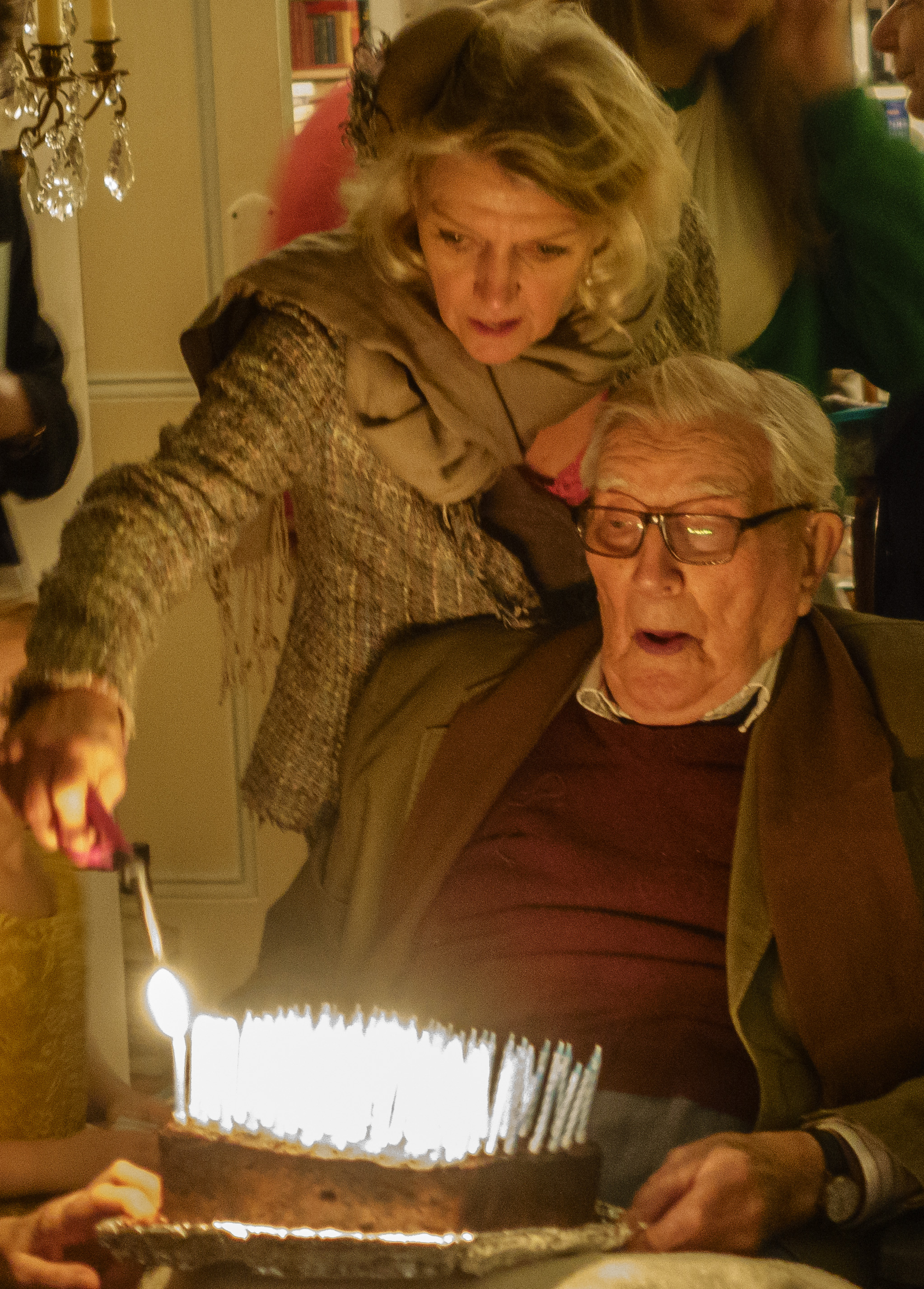
- Briggs with his daughter Anne Atkins at his 100th birthday
- Born: John Davidson Briggs; 7 November 1917; Norwich, England
- Died: 16 March 2020 (aged 102)
- Education: Fairfield Preparatory School; Marlborough College; King's College, Cambridge
- Occupations: Educator, headmaster
- Known for: Choral scholar
- Spouse: Catherine Mary Lormer (married 1940)
- Children: 4 including Andrew Briggs and Anne Atkins
- Parent(s): George Wallace Briggs, Constance Barrow

John Davidson Briggs (7 November 1917 – 16 March 2020), known as David Briggs, was an English educator and headmaster of King's College School, Cambridge.

== Life ==
=== Early life and education ===
Briggs was born on 7 November 1917 in Norwich, England, son of Canon George Wallace Briggs and Constance Emily Tebbutt Barrow. One of his godfathers was the Archbishop of Canterbury Randall Davidson. He sang in the Choir of King's College, Cambridge, both as a chorister, from 1927 to 1931, and as a choral scholar, from 1936 to 1939. He attended Fairfield Preparatory School in Loughborough, before attending Marlborough College as a Foundation scholar, and then studied classics and history at King's College, Cambridge, where he held simultaneously an academic exhibition and a choral scholarship.

He sang in the first broadcast Christmas Eve carol service from King’s College Chapel in 1928, and continued to sing in a church choir throughout his life. He was interviewed by Mishal Husain in A Celebration of Christmas Carols broadcast on BBC Radio 2 on 25 December 2013, making his broadcasting career span 85 years. He was again interviewed on the BBC Today programme on 24 December 2015 in which Briggs, aged 98, believed he was the last survivor of the 1928 choir.

In 2013, he returned to Loughborough Grammar School when a room in the Music School was dedicated in his family’s name.

=== Marriage and family ===
In 1940, he married Catherine Mary Lormer, an Australian mathematics teacher whose students would include Sir Andrew Wiles, who later proved Fermat’s Last Theorem, and Sir Timothy Gowers, Rouse Ball Professor at Cambridge. The children of David and Mary Briggs are Johnny, who farms in Wales, Andrew, Professor of Nanomaterials at Oxford, Catherine, a teacher of the visually impaired, and Anne Atkins, novelist, writer and broadcaster.

=== Wartime ===
During World War II, as a conscientious objector Briggs was drafted into the Pay Corps, a job which he disliked intensely so his father, who was then Vice-Dean of Worcester Cathedral, negotiated him a transfer into the Medical Corps. However, it became a requirement that members of the Medical Corps had to bear arms, an order which he refused to obey on the grounds that he would not bear arms that he would not use, and faced the possibility of court-martial. The threat was withdrawn after the order was found to be against the Geneva Convention, and for the rest of the war he continued as a corporal, being ineligible for promotion or decoration as a conscientious objector. He took part in the Normandy landings and help set up a field hospital, 102 British General Hospital near Bayeux, where he formed a choir of about 25 doctors and nurses which subsequently performed in different parts of Normandy.

In early June 2014, Briggs recounted his experiences from this time in a radio interview given in a brief BBC D-Day anniversary presentation.

=== Career ===
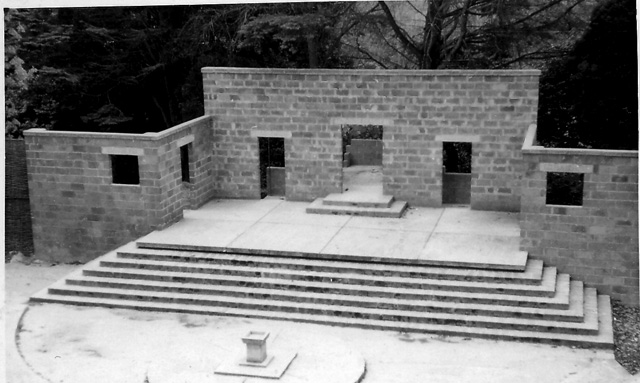
The Greek Theatre in the grounds of Bryanston School

From 1946, he taught classics at Bryanston School in Dorset. With his wife's mathematical help in the planning and the boys' labour, he built the Greek Theatre at Bryanston which led to the Greek summer school which is now held there every year.

In 1959, following a short hiatus, Briggs succeeded Donald George Butters as Headmaster of King's College School, Cambridge, a position he held until his retirement in 1977. During his tenure he turned the school co-educational. The school's Briggs Building, created to house science, languages and maths classrooms and a library, is named after him and his wife Mary.

=== Friendships ===
After returning to Cambridge he became a close friend of conductor, organist and composer Sir David Willcocks, and of church historian The Revd Professor Owen Chadwick.

=== Death ===
The couple moved to live with their daughter Anne and her family, where Briggs celebrated his 100th birthday with a hundred friends and past pupils. He died on 16 March 2020, aged 102. The COVID-19 pandemic restrictions allowed only five people to attend his funeral and his grandson Ben Atkins compiled a virtual choir and chamber group in which family members, friends, and former choristers performed a song written by his daughter Anne Atkins with music arranged by Ben.
