= Christopher Templeton =

Scottish/Hungarian scriptwriter and director

Christopher Frederick Templeton (born 13 December 1960) is a Scottish/Hungarian scriptwriter and director whose radio plays and television documentaries highlighted human rights abuses in Europe during the post Cold War era of the 1990s.

== Early life ==
Templeton was born in Los Angeles, California, the son of the Glasgow playwright and screenwriter, William Templeton. He graduated from the London International Film School in 1985, and his first writing work was for radio.

== Career ==
Templeton scripted and directed several productions for the BBC World Service's Play of the Week series, which broadcast new and politically charged plays. Templeton directed Play of the Week's production of Ad de Bont's Mirad, A Boy from Bosnia, which was well-received by Sue Gaisford of The Independent, who described the production as "...almost unbearably moving". While Mirad amplified the human cost of the Bosnian genocide, a later production, Rupa Lucian, Child of Romania exposed the atrocities of the ‘Securitatae’, Romania’s secret police.
