= Oliver Churchill =

British SOE agent

- Born: 1914; Stockholm, Sweden
- Died: 1997 (aged 82–83); Cambridge, England
- Military career
- Allegiance: United Kingdom
- Branch: British Army
- Service years: 1939–1945
- Rank: Major
- Service number: 96284
- Units: The Worcestershire Regiment; Special Operations Executive
- Conflicts: Second World War
- Awards: Distinguished Service Order; Military Cross

William Oliver Churchill, DSO, MC (1914–1997) was a Special Operations Executive (SOE) officer during the Second World War.

He was the younger brother of Walter Churchill and Peter Churchill.

== Early life ==
Churchill was born in Stockholm in 1914 the son of William Algernon Churchill (1865–1947), a British Consul who served in Mozambique, Amsterdam, Pará in Brazil, Stockholm, Milan, Palermo, and Algiers, who was also an art connoisseur, and author of what is still the standard reference work on early European paper and papermaking, Watermarks in Paper. His mother was Violet (née Myers).

He was educated at Stowe School and Cambridge University where he read Modern Languages at King's College, after which he studied architecture at Cambridge before his studies were interrupted by the war.

== Wartime activities ==
As war became imminent, Churchill joined the Territorial Army and was soon called up to the Worcestershire Regiment, and became Company Commander. Following his brother, Peter, he joined the Special Operations Executive (SOE). In December 1941, he was posted to Malta and the Middle East to train Italian partisans and was subsequently posted to SOE Middle East headquarters in Cairo from where he was involved in clandestine, behind-the-lines work in Greece and Italy. His nom de guerre was Anthony Peters.

=== Corfu ===
Operation Acheron In early September 1943 the Italian Armed Forces surrendered and transferred their allegiance from the Axis Powers to the Allies. General Eisenhower considered Corfu of importance to the Allies in the Balkan campaign and decided to immediately send a small force to reinforce the Italian troops against German invasion. Churchill and a radio operator, Signalman Harrison, were briefed to contact the Italian commander in Corfu and inform him of the Allies' intention to reinforce the Italians and to ensure the Italian resistance continued until the Allied troops arrived. Churchill was briefed: Little was known of the situation in Corfu. Fighting was to be expected anywhere. We might be fired on by either or both sides.

On 21 September 1943, two weeks after the Italian Armistice, and a week after Germany invaded Corfu, Churchill and Harrison were flown from Cairo and parachuted into Corfu by night in Operation Acheron. They made contact with the Italian commander, Colonel Lusignani. Unfortunately, the radio equipment was damaged by the parachute drop, making contact with SOE Headquarters in Cairo difficult. Radio contact was made initially, but then the radio failed and further communication could not be made with Cairo for further instructions. On 25 September, after discussions with Lusignani, who informed him the Germans had broken through their defences and were advancing on the town and that the Italian forces would have to surrender, Churchill decided to exfiltrate himself and the radio operator from the island. With the Germans approaching, they spent several days dressed in peasant clothing evading capture before he could arrange their escape by sea. On 26 September, the Italians surrendered after losing hundreds of men and running out of ammunition. Lusignani and 28 of his officers were executed.

It took several days before an unreliable motorboat skippered by a septuagenarian could be made seaworthy and its departure from Palaiokastritsa was then delayed for two days by strong winds and currents. With a crew of three who Churchill described as "one dotard, one drunkard and the father of a thief" and 11 Italian soldier and sailor escapees who joined the boat, he and Harrison were taken by night to the islands of Mathraki, Ereikoussa and Fanos, before making an overnight crossing of the Adriatic towards the heel of Italy. The wind changed direction during the night and blew them off course, passing to the west of the heel of Italy into the Bay of Taranto. Churchill recalled: "By first light we saw land. But for one of the Italian sailors from Corfu, the captain would have turned about. He did not recognise the coast, and thought we had sailed in a circle and were off Albania. The captain was too bleary-eyed to read the compass and the bosun helpless with the sails. All this the sailor saw to, as well as keeping the mechanic at the pumps. Our sailor saw that we were in the Bay of Taranto. The drift had carried us five hours off our course." The boat was turned round and sailed around the peninsula to land at Otranto. Churchill was then transferred to a ship and taken to Brindisi where he was debriefed by Captain De Haan at the Italian SOE base at the Allied Military Mission, before being instructed by Cmdr Gerry Holdsworth, Commander of No 1 Special Force, to return to base at SOE Headquarters in Cairo. Following this operation he awarded an MC.

=== Italy ===
Operation Nunnery II On 8 July 1944, Churchill was given Operation Instructions from G.S.O II Italian Section to parachute into Val d'Aosta, in Northern Italy 50 miles (80 kilometres) north of Turin, during July full moon in Operation Nunnery II to establish a British Liaison Mission with the local HQ. There is no record in the National Archives that this operation actually took place.

Operation Floodlight/Fairway In August 1944, Churchill was parachuted by night into German occupied Northern Italy on the steep mountainside above Ranzanico on the edge of Lago di Endine, north east of Bergamo, in Operation Floodlight/Fairway with General Cadorna, Commander of the Partisan Movement in Northern Italy, to act as head of the British liaison mission to the Partisan Movement in Northern Italy, where he spent several months behind enemy lines.

Incorrect details of their landing ground had been given, possibly deliberately by a local faction to claim credit for the landing of General Cadorna in their area, resulting in them arriving in the wrong location and all of the stores, apart from the wireless transmitters, but including his personal kit and 1 million lire which had been issued to him for the operation, were taken by the locals. The group of parachutists comprising Churchill, General Cadorna, Augusto De Laurentis (Liaison Officer to the Milan Committee), and Sergeant Nicola Delle Monache (Wireless Operator), had great difficulty finding the proper reception committee. A few hours after reaching the safe house, they found their cover was blown and the SS had burnt down the safe house, and so they had to leave in great haste to avoid an SS search party which had been sent to look for them. After this, they were out of radio contact for about 20 hours.

They then walked carrying their parachutes to the Brigate Fiamme Verdi headquarters in Cividate Camuno, which proved to be an eight-hour march away. Churchill had twisted his ankle during the parachute landing on the steep terrain and took shelter in a farmhouse in Esine near Cividate Camuno for a few days to recuperate before climbing up a steep mountain path to a remote farm building above Esine, which was unlikely to be discovered by German patrols. De Laurentis went to Milan almost at once in order to reconnoitre, and about a fortnight later the ground was prepared sufficiently for General Cadorna to go to Milan also. This was successfully arranged with the help of the Franchi organisation. Churchill remained with the Fiamme Verdi for about four weeks as it was considered unsafe for him to go too, but became convinced that nothing would be achieved unless he also went to Milan, and wrote to see whether this could be arranged. He received a reply from General Cadorna saying that, under no circumstances should he go as conditions were far too difficult and dangerous. In the same post, he received a letter from Edgardo Sogno saying that everything had been prepared for him to go to Milan and that he should come at once. Churchill decided to accept Sogno's invitation and left for Milan on 14 September. During his first seven days in Milan, he had to change houses six times, though not entirely due to security reasons.

The partisan leaders he worked with included:

- Alfredo Pizzoni who was chairman of the CLNAI (Comitato di Liberazione Nazionale – High Committee for National Liberation Italy) since its establishment until the end of the war; who on 7 December 1944 with Giancarlo Pajetta, Ferruccio Parri and Edgardo Sogno was a signatory of an agreement with the Allies represented by General Henry Maitland Wilson, SACMED (Supreme Allied Commander for the Mediterranean) which, in addition to recognising the role played by the CLNAI resistance, financed their guerrilla warfare with a loan of 160 million lire a month. The agreement, to cooperate fully with the Allies and for the subordination of the military CLNAI allied forces, ensured the survival of the Italian Resistance and its success more from a political than a military point of view.
- Lionello Levi Sandri leader of the Fiamme Verdi partisan brigade in Brescia who went on to become a European Commissioner.
- Edgardo Sogno who created the Organizazzione Franchi partisan group which helped hundreds of Italian Jews and others seek safe haven in Switzerland and who represented the Italian Liberal Party at the CLNAI.
- Luigi Longo, a Communist politician who went on to become secretary of the Italian Communist Party.
- Ferruccio Parri leader of the Action Party (Partito d'Azione) and president of the CLN (Comitato di Liberazione Nazionale), who went on to become Prime Minister of Italy in 1945.
- Pierluigi Tumiati, head of the Milan Franchi organisation

Churchill was based in Milan with partisans of different factions. He made trips to Biella to meet Major Alistair MacDonald, leader of the Cherokee Mission and Turin to meet other partisan leaders, narrowly missing capture on some of these visits. In mid-November, he received an insider tip from the police advising him that his position was becoming precarious and he should leave as soon as possible for his own safety. Accompanied by Pierluigi Tumiati, head of the Milan Franchi organisation, he took the train to Como on 2 December using the alias of Giulio Kravic, an Italian Slovene, as a convenient method of explaining his foreign accent,. He then crossed the frontier over the mountains on foot and after meetings with SOE representatives John Birkbeck in Lugano and Jock McCaffery in Berne he returned to the SOE Italy base in Monopoli, where he remained until being recalled to the UK on 27 January 1945 to report on recent operations and be awarded the Distinguished Service Order. He went back to Italy on 26 March and, after the surrender of German forces in Italy on 2 May, finally returned to the UK on 6 May.

This officer was parachuted into N. Italy on 12 Aug 44 to act as head of the British Liaison Mission to the command of the Partisan Movement in Northern Italy. Since this date he has been Chief Liaison Officer to the C.L.N.A.I and to the Partisan Central Command, both tasks of great responsibility. During the entire period under review he has shown outstanding ability, considerable initiative, and has at all times been reliable in his information. Captain Churchill is head of our most important mission.

— Lieutenant Colonel Richard Thornton Hewitt, Commanding Officer of the Allied No 1 Special Force in the Italian Campaign.

== Post-war ==
In 1946 he married Ruth Briggs, who was a key member of the British intelligence code-breaking team at Bletchley Park during the war.

They moved back to Cambridge where he practised as an architect. He died in Cambridge in 1997.

His eldest son, Toby, is a leading disabled entrepreneur in the UK who founded a company manufacturing communication aids for people who cannot speak. His other children are Simon and Flora.

== Legacy ==
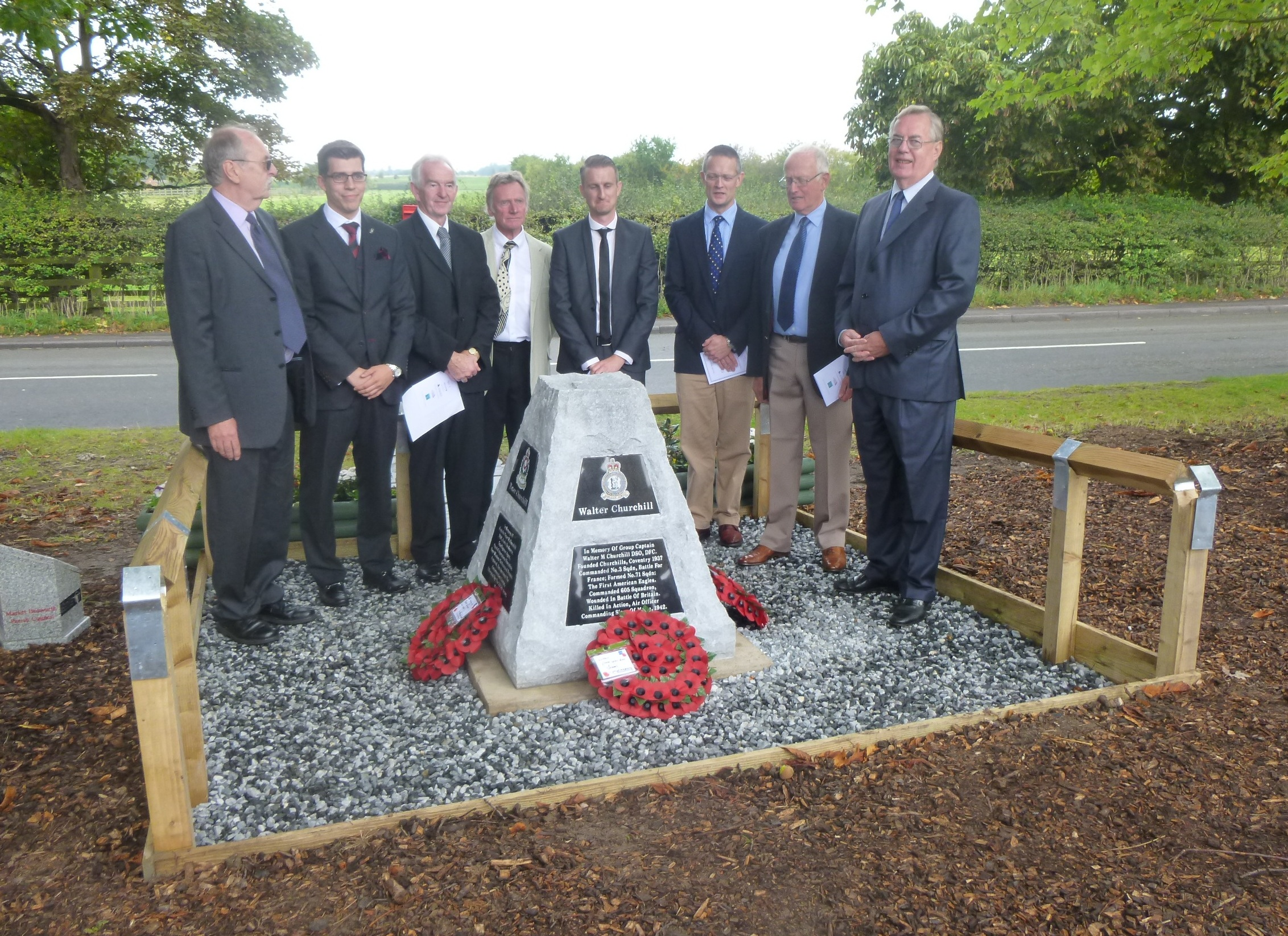
Memorial to the three Churchill Brothers

Oliver's brother, Walter, relocated his engineering business, JJ Churchill, from Coventry to Market Bosworth during the war. After the Market Bosworth Historical Society became aware of the wartime gallantry of not just Walter, but also of his brothers Peter and Oliver, it decided to fund a memorial Cairn. The granite Cairn is located in front of the JJ Churchill factory, and was unveiled in autumn 2015.

Three of the four sides commemorate each of the Churchill brothers, while the fourth side commemorates the factory’s relocation from Coventry to Market Bosworth and Walter landing his Hurricane in the field opposite while overseeing the factory’s move.

== Bibliography ==
- Mission Accomplished : SOE and Italy 1943–1945, David Stafford, The Bodley Head, ISBN 978-1-84792-065-2
- La neve cade sui monti – Dal diario di un ribelle Vitale (Tani) Bonettini – Edizioni Valgrigna 1975 / Edizioni Quetti – 1989
- C1 "SILVIO" Vallecamonica – Nella Resistenza Bresciana Giulio Mazzon – Edizioni Arti Grafiche Jasillo – Novembre 1997
- Dizionario della Resistenza Bresciana – A-M – First volume of two. Rolando Anni – Tipografia Camuna S.p.A. – ISBN 978-88-372-2279-6
- Una vita per la libertà e la giustizia Lionello Levi Sandri – Istitito storico della Resistenza Bresciana
