= Timeline of SOE's Prosper Network =

The Prosper Network, also called the Physician Network, was the most important network in France of the Special Operations Executive (SOE) in 1943. SOE was a secret British organization in World War II. The objectives of SOE were to conduct espionage, sabotage, and reconnaissance in occupied Europe and Asia against the Axis powers, especially Nazi Germany. SOE agents in France allied themselves with French Resistance groups and supplied them with weapons and equipment parachuted in from Britain.

An SOE network in France (also called a circuit or a reseau) usually consisted of three agents: an organizer and leader, a courier, and a radio operator. Prosper, based in Paris, grew to be much larger. The Prosper Network began in September 1942 when Andrée Borrel parachuted into France, followed by leader Francis Suttill, code named "Prosper," a few days later. Suttill had early success in finding French supporters willing to oppose the German occupation of France. Prosper soon had links from the "Ardennes to the Atlantic" in northern France with 30 SOE agents and hundreds of French associates. The destruction of Prosper began with the capture by Germans of Suttill and others in June 1943 and continued for months afterwards. SOE French Section headquarters in London, headed by Maurice Buckmaster and Nicolas Bodington, was slow to recognize that Prosper had been destroyed. SOE radios captured by the Germans were used to deceive SOE headquarters. Most of the captured SOE agents and many of their French associates were executed. SOE agents captured by the Germans were customarily treated with the Nacht und Nebel (Night and Fog) policy by which they disappeared without a trace into German concentration camps or were executed with no records being kept as to their fate.

The literature about the Prosper network is large and theories, often conspiratorial, abound about the reasons for the fall of Prosper and its aftermath. The conclusions of M.R.D. Foot in his official history of SOE's F (French) Section were that the disaster was caused by the incompetence of SOE agents in France and gullibility of SOE leaders in London, plus the work of an alleged double agent, Henri Déricourt. Sarah Helm's conclusions were that the errors were due to "terrible incompetence and tragic mistakes". Mark Seaman cited also the "efficient practices" of the German security forces. The opposing view, advocated by a few, is that Prosper was deliberately sacrificed by the British intelligence services as part of Operation Cockade to mislead the Germans about allied plans for the invasion of Nazi-occupied Europe. The reasoning behind the deception was that if the Germans anticipated an invasion of France in 1943, they would maintain or expand their occupation forces in western Europe, rather than sending resources east to combat the advancing Soviet Army. According to this theory, the Germans interpreted the rapid expansion of SOE in France in 1943 as a prelude to invasion that same year. (The invasion didn't take place until June 1944.)

== 1942 ==
France in 1942.

- 8 September. Itinerant French pilot France Henri Déricourt arrived in the United Kingdom after being smuggled out of France by the Pat O'Leary Escape Line. He was investigated by MI5 (Security Service) which said that it was "unable to guarantee his reliability." Despite those concerns he was subsequently recruited by MI6 (Secret Intelligence Service) before having his name and credentials passed to the Special Operations Executive (SOE) in November 1942. Déricourt's old friend, Nicolas Bodington, now the second in command of SOE's French section, endorsed his employment enthusiastically.
- 25 September. Courier Andrée Borrel parachuted into France, landing near the town of Crouy-sur-Cosson, 160 km (99 miles) southwest of Paris. Borrel was the first female agent of SOE to arrive in France by parachute. She was met by SOE agents Yvonne Rudellat and Pierre Culioli, who posed as a married couple.
- 2 October. Organiser Francis Suttill, the leader of Prosper, was dropped blind (without a reception group) by parachute near La Ferté-sous-Jouarre, 60 km (37 miles) east of Paris. Parachuting with him was Jean Amps, a horse groom who was to work for Suttill. Suttill hurt his knee on landing. He proceeded to Paris to meet Borrel in a cafe she was familiar with. Reunited with each other, the couple embarked on a tour of northern France, masquerading as a brother and sister who were selling agricultural equipment, and utilizing a list of contacts supplied to SOE by the Carte network which operated mostly in southern France.
- 31 October. Radio operator Gilbert Norman parachuted into France near Crouy-sur-Cosson. Norman carried with him a poison pill to kill Pierre Culioli, as SOE agent Raymond Flower had accused Culioli of being a double agent. None of the SOE agents was willing to administer the pill. Flower also attempted to get rid of Rudellat by leaving incriminating items in her room. Culioli was furious at this attack on his character and loyalty. He and Ruddelat broke off relations with Flower, joined Suttill, and created the small Adolph Network which became a sub-network of Prosper. Flower was later withdrawn from France by SOE at the request of Suttill.
- 8 November. Allied military forces invaded French possessions in North Africa and in response the Germans occupied the previously-unoccupied portion of southern France called Vichy France or the "Free zone." Life for SOE agents in southern France became more dangerous, but most of Prosper's operations were in northern France.
- mid-November. Traveling by train to Paris, André Marsac, a courier for the Carte network (a failed predecessor to Prosper), had his briefcase stolen by a German agent. The briefcase contained the names and personal information about more than 200 Carte supporters. The Germans continued to observe Carte, but did not take immediate action to arrest those people on the list. Suttill would unknowingly be in contact with many people on the Carte list as he built the Prosper network.
- 18 November. Prosper received its first air drop of guns, grenades, and plastic explosive. Suttill, Borrel, Rudellat, and Norman were at the drop site near Étrépagny, 75 km (47 miles) northwest of Paris. The arms were distributed to resistance groups, including communists who were numerous and well-organized in the northern suburbs of Paris.
- 30 December. Jack Agazarian parachuted into France to join the Prosper Network as a second radio operator. He was later joined by his wife Francine, a courier. They were one of only a few married couples working for SOE.

== 1943 (January to June) ==
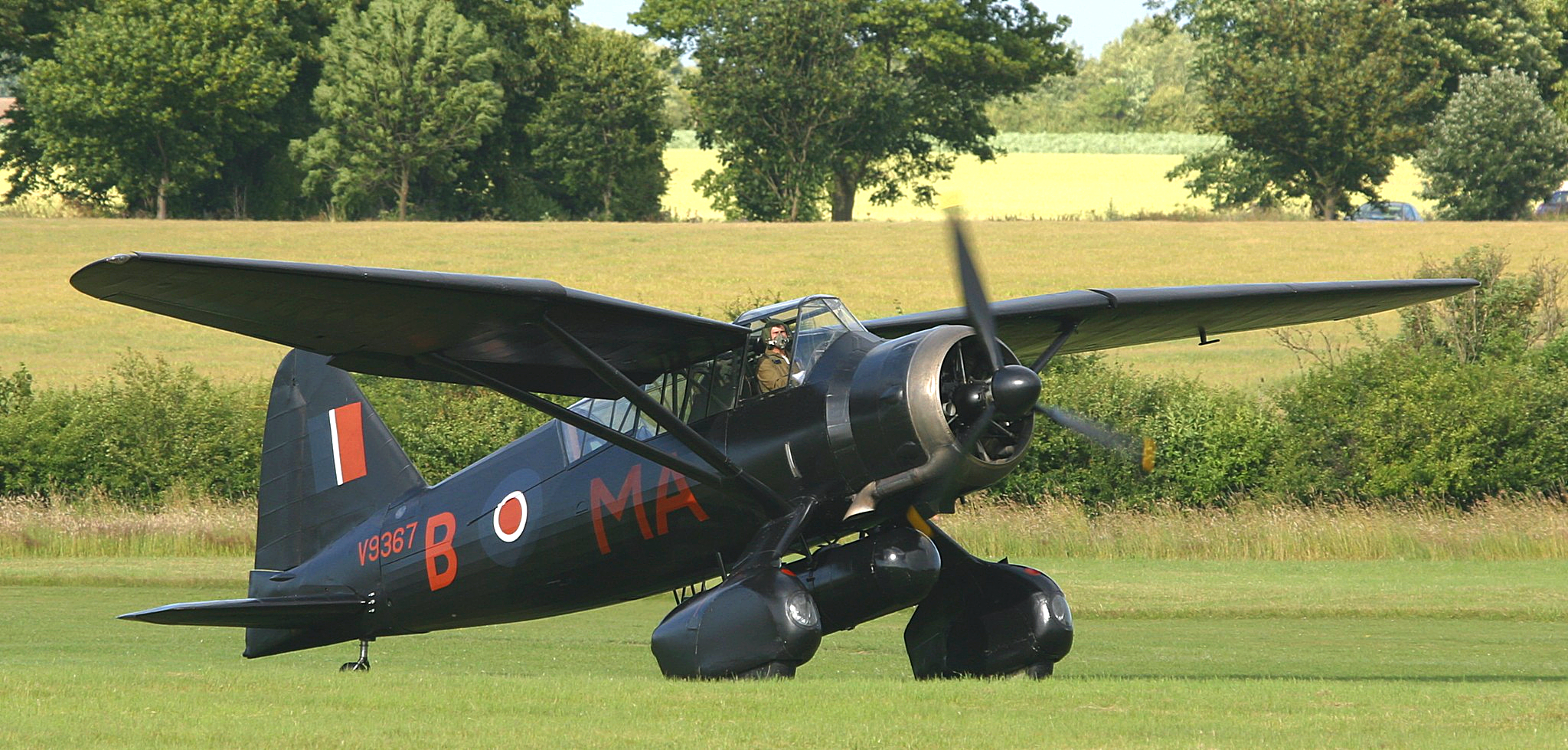
The Westland Lysander ferried agents back and forth to England. A CLE Canister beneath the fuselage carried supplies.

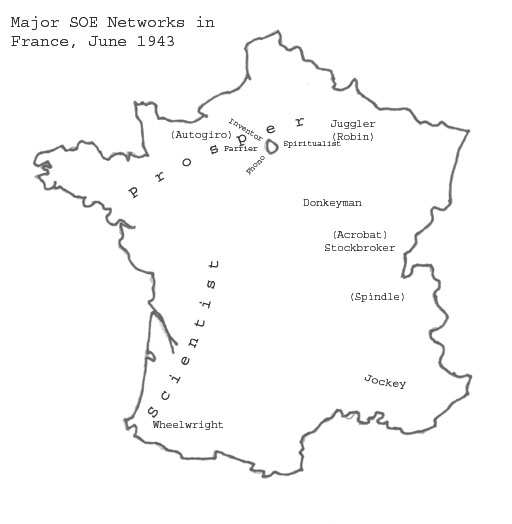

- 23 January. Henri Déricourt, code named Gilbert, was dropped by parachute into France near Orleans. He proceeded to Paris where he joined his wife and, unlike most SOE agents, lived under his own name as he was a well-known pilot. Déricourt was designated as the air movements officer for Prosper, finding landing fields for clandestine flights from Britain, sending off and receiving passengers on those flights, and receiving supplies and messages. He acted also as a postman, collecting uncoded messages from agents in France for SOE Headquarters in London. Déricourt is alleged to have been a pre-war friend of Karl Bömelburg, the Gestapo head in Paris.
- 18 March. Déricourt accomplished his first air operation successfully. Two Westland Lysander airplanes landed at night on a clandestine field near Poitiers and dropped off four agents and boarded four more for return to Britain. Déricourt arranged successful landings in France for 11 Lysanders by the end of June.
- 22 April. Sisters Germaine and Madeleine Tambour were captured in Paris by the Germans. Germaine had been the secretary for the now-defunct Carte network. Ten SOE agents had used the Tambour's house as a letter box and meeting place, violating SOE doctrine that agents should have limited contact with each other. Suttill attempted to free the sisters by bribing the Germans with one million francs, but the Germans deceived him by releasing two prostitutes instead. The Tambour sisters were later executed in Ravensbrück concentration camp.
- 15 May. Francis Suttill departed France by clandestine flight to London for consultations with SOE Headquarters, especially F Section Leader Maurice Buckmaster. According to Buckmaster, SOE wanted to quell growing French expectations of an allied invasion of France in 1943. However, Buckmaster contradicted himself in another book by saying that he received a top-secret hint that the invasion would take place in 1943. Historians have speculated that he told Suttill to increase the activities of his network to support the anticipated 1943 invasion (which did not occur until June 1944). In either event, Suttill's mood was grim. He criticized SOE headquarters for its mistakes, cited problems within his network, and said the network may have been penetrated by the Germans.
- 17 May. Two Dutch men, Richard Christmann and Karl Boden, posing as SOE agents but belonging to the German Abwehr, arrived at a Paris cafe asking for "Gilbert" (Déricourt), and requesting evacuation to Britain. Without attempting to verify the bona fides of the bogus Dutch agents, several legitimate SOE agents met with them. The incident is significant because it illustrates the lack of attention to security by Prosper agents and the ease by which the network could be infiltrated.
- 21 May. Francis Suttill arrived back in Paris after his visit to SOE Headquarters in London Some historians claim that Suttill had been told in London that an allied invasion of France was imminent and that he should accelerate arming the resistance to assist the invasion. Supporting this speculation was the fact that SOE greatly expanded the number of air drops of weapons to Prosper and other SOE networks in June.
- 12 June. Suttill told friends "somebody who had enjoyed my trust must be a double agent."
- 13 June. At an airdrop in the Sologne region one or more canisters full of arms and ammunition exploded arousing German attention. Pierre Culioli requested Suttill to halt the near-nightly air activities in the Sologne as a result of the increased German presence. Suttill refused and the landings and airdrops continued. The Germans set up checkpoints around the area.
- 16 June. Two Canadian agents, Frank Pickersgill and Ken Macalister, parachuted into the Sologne region near where the explosion had occurred on 13 June. They were met by Pierre Culioli and Yvonne Ruddelat. The Canadians brought with them several messages for other SOE agents and crystals for Gilbert Norman's radio. Their SOE-forged identification papers were out of date and they remained in hiding while Culioli had new documents made.
- 17 June. Radio operator Noor Inayat Khan, arrived in France by Lysander airplane. She was met by Henri Déricourt. On 20 June Gilbert Norman radioed SOE that Noor had arrived in Versailles near Paris. Inayat Khan initially worked for France Antelme and later Êmile Garry.
- 21 June. Culioli and Ruddelat intended to drive Pickersgill and Macalister to Beaugency to catch a trail to Paris, but in Dhuizon they were stopped by Germans and Macalister and Pickersgill were captured. Culioli and Ruddelat attempted to flee in the automobile, but, chased by Germans, Ruddelat was shot in the head and Culioli crashed into a wall. Both survived the crash and were captured. Culioli had a list of names and addresses of SOE agents and supporters in his briefcase. Ruddelat died of mistreatment and illness in Belsen concentration camp about 23 April 1945, after the camp had been liberated by Allied forces. Culioli survived the war in Buchenwald concentration camp. Pickersgill and Macalister were executed in Buchenwald on 14 September 1944.
- 23 June. The arms and equipment air-dropped to SOE agents for the French Resistance in 1943 up until this date totaled more than 500 CLE Canisters, each containing up to 150 kg (330 lb) of supplies. Related, possibly, to Suttill's belief that an allied invasion of France would occur in 1943, Prosper received a substantial increase in parachuted arms and supplies. For example, in Pierre Culioli's Sologne region, nine drops occurred from January through May 1943; in the first three weeks of June, twelve drops were carried out. The delegations on the ground receiving the drops were exhausted.
- 23 June. Radio operator Jack Agazarian, now in London, wrote a report in which he described Henri Déricourt's security as faulty.
- 23 June. Gilbert Norman and Andrée Borrel, who had become lovers, were captured by the Germans about midnight at the home of a friend in Paris. They were taken to 84 Avenue Foch, headquarters of Josef Kieffer, commander in Paris of the Sicherheitsdienst (SD), the intelligence agency of the SS. 84 Avenue Foch was the usual place where captured SOE agents were interrogated and imprisoned for varying lengths of time.
- 24 June. Francis Suttill was captured by German agents in a cheap hotel in Paris. Norman and Borrel were the only people who had known his location, although he may have been followed by the Germans. Suttill was taken to the SD headquarters at 84 Avenue Foch. Suttill's last message to SOE Headquarters also arrived in London on this date. He complained bitterly about SOE's mistake in giving Noor Inayat Khan the location of a 'blown" letterbox which nearly resulted in her capture by the Germans. He accused SOE headquarters of "breaking a cardinal rule by allowing one circuit to be contaminated by another."
- 25 June. Noor Inayat Khan radioed SOE headquarters that Suttill, Norman, and Borrel "had disappeared, believed arrested." It would be almost two weeks before more details would reach SOE headquarters.
- Late June. Only fragmentary accounts exist of their first few days as prisoners of the Germans, but apparently the leadership trio—Suttill, Norman, and Borrel—were not tortured. In accordance with SOE doctrine, Suttill and Norman refused under questioning to give any information during the first 48 hours of their imprisonment to allow time for other Prosper agents who might be compromised to flee. Kieffer then demonstrated to them the breadth of his knowledge about the Prosper network. He gave them the impression that he had an agent in SOE headquarters, knew everything about Prosper, and that resistance to his questioning was futile. One or both of them is alleged to have made a pact with Kieffer to give him full information about the location of cached arms in return for their lives and the lives of other captured agents. Kieffer later said that Suttill "did not want to make any statement" but that Norman "who had not the integrity of Prosper [Suttill], made a very full statement." Borrel apparently gave information to the Germans. Culioli also gave information to the Germans.
- 29 June. The German roundup of SOE agents and their French associates netted them a large quantity of arms and two working radios, that of Norman and of the Canadian Macalister. The Germans recalled their radio expert at SD Headquarters in Paris, Dr. Josef Goetz, from vacation to exploit the two radios in what the Germans called Funkspiel, the "radio game."

== 1943 (July to December) ==
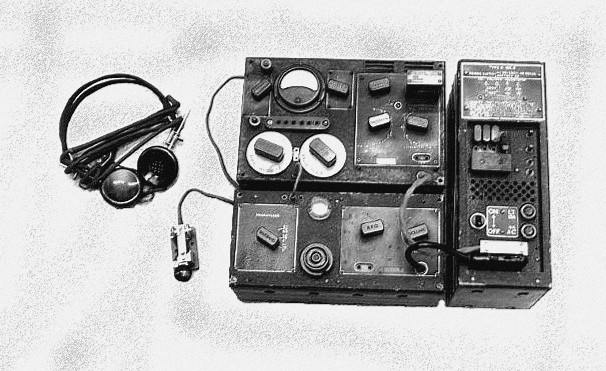
The B2 radio weighed a cumbersome 15 kg (33 lb) and required a long exterior aerial to transmit. A radio operator had the most dangerous of SOE jobs in France.

- 1 July. The capture of SOE agents and their French associates by the Germans continued. Jean Worms, an aspirant to leadership of Prosper after Suttill's capture, and Armel Guerne were captured at a Paris cafe. Worms ate lunch every day in the cafe, another lapse in SOE's guidance for agents' personal security. SOE agent Jacques Weil saw the two men being led away in handcuffs by the Germans. Worms was executed by the Germans on 29 March 1945; Guerne survived and later said he escaped from a train en route to a German concentration camp. Only the communist associates of Prosper were unaffected as they were "looking to Suttill for arms and money, but not for orders" and had retained their operational independence.
- 7 July. A radio message arrived at SOE Headquarters in London purporting to be from Gilbert Norman in Paris, but actually from the Germans. The message said that Suttill had been captured, but that he, Norman, was still at large. However, the message lacked the spelling mistakes and phrases deliberately inserted into a message by a wireless operator to prove who was transmitting the message. Buckmaster refused to believe that the message was not genuine and sent back a reply to Norman's radio saying, "You have forgotten your double security check. Be more careful next time." He had inadvertently told the Germans how to transmit messages to SOE which would be accepted as genuine.
- 15 July. Unsure of what was happening with the Prosper Network, but believing that Gilbert Norman was still free and in control of his radio, SOE headquarters radioed him saying that a "London representative" would be coming to Paris to investigate. The reply the same day from "Norman" (i.e. the Germans) gave SOE an address to be contacted when the representative arrived.
- 23 July. SOE Deputy Nicolas Bodington and radio operator Jack Agazarian arrived in France by clandestine aircraft and were met on the ground by Henri Déricourt. They proceeded to Paris.
- 30 July. Through radio contacts and notes allegedly from Norman, a meeting was set up for Bodington and Agazarian to meet Norman at a Paris apartment. Suspicious of treachery, only Agazarian went to the apartment where Germans met and captured him. According to Bodington, they flipped a coin to see who would go to the meeting and Agazarian lost. A witness claimed that Bodington ordered Agazarian to go to the meeting. After Agazarian's capture, Bodington continued to investigate the fate of Prosper, making contact with SOE agents Noor Inayat Khan, Emile Garry, and Henri Frager who briefed him on events. While Bodington was in Paris, the Germans captured three more SOE agents and a radio.
- 3 August. SOE agent Henri Frager wrote a note to Bodington in Paris saying that the Germans were in control of several SOE radios and that Henri Déricourt was "the chief source of the Gestapo's information." Bodington rejected Frager's accusations against Déricourt.
- 16 August. Bodington returned to Britain by clandestine flight. On the same flight with him were SOE agents (and brother and sister) Claude and Lise de Baissac who were fleeing the Prosper disaster. On his return, Bodington blamed the destruction of Prosper on poor security and the collaboration by Suttill with communists. He also said there was "not the slightest possibility" that Déricourt's air operations organization had been infiltrated by the Germans.
- 7 September. SOE agent Marcel Rousset was captured. He met Norman at SD headquarters who told him that he and Suttill had made a pact with the Germans and that the Germans knew everything about Prosper and, to save his life, Rousset should admit to being an SOE agent. Rousset also said that Déricourt and "somebody in London" were traitors. Rousset later escaped from the Germans and became a major source of information to SOE about the fate of captured Prosper agents
- Late September. SOE agent John Starr, captured and tortured in Dijon, arrived at 84 Avenue Foch and met Gilbert Norman. Starr said that Norman told him that Suttill had made a pact with the Germans to save the lives of SOE agents and there was no need to resist interrogation as the Germans knew everything.
- 13 October, Noor Inayat Khan was captured along with her radio by the Germans in Paris. Noor was possibly betrayed by Renée Garry, sister of Noor's organiser Emile Garry, for the reward the Germans offered for information regarding SOE agents. Noor made several attempts to escape and was impervious to German interrogation. Her interrogator, SD's Ernest Vogt, said, "She is impossible. I never met a woman like her."
- 21 October. Henri Frager returned to Britain via Lysander on a flight organized by Déricourt. They two had an altercation before the flight as Déricourt tried but failed to force Roger Bardet (an associate of Frager but unknown to him an informer of the Gestapo) onto the airplane. The purpose of Frager's return was to tell SOE headquarters that a "Colonel Heinrich" (actually German agent Hugo Bleicher) had told him that Déricourt "was working for the Germans." SOE F Section leader Buckmaster did not believe Frager's charges against Déricourt.
- 25 November. Noor Inayat Khan, John Starr, and Leon Faye attempted to escape from 84 Avenue Foch by climbing through a skylight. They were recaptured. Kieffer said if they promised not to try to escape again he would forgive them. Starr promised, Noor and Faye did not. The next day the two of them were en route to concentration camps in Germany where both were executed.
- End of year. Official SOE historian M.R.D. Foot estimated that German arrests of SOE agents and French associates in 1943 totaled 400. Francis J. Suttill, son of SOE agent Suttill, listed more than 180 persons arrested and deported to German concentration camps in 1943. About one-half of them were executed or died. Not included on his list were those jailed and killed in France.

== 1944 ==
- 9 February. Henri Déricourt departed France by Lysander to return to Britain accompanied by his wife. He was suspected of being a German agent.
- 21 February. After interviewing and investigating Déricourt, who "makes a good personal impression", a committee of top SOE officials decided that should not be allowed to go back to France based on doubts about his loyalty and his contacts with the Germans.
- 29 February. The Germans continued to use captured SOE radios to deceive SOE and its agents. The Germans captured France Antelme, an experienced agent, his radio operator Lionel Lee, and his courier Madeleine Damerment as they landed by parachute in a farm field. All three were imprisoned and later executed by the Germans.
- 6 June. Allied military forces invaded France on D-Day. As the allies advanced, the Germans transported SOE agents imprisoned in France to Germany where most of them were executed. The radio game the Germans played with SOE had run out and Josef Kieffer, SD head in Paris, sent a taunting message to his opposite number, Maurice Buckmaster, at SOE. "We thank you," Kieffer said, "for the large deliveries of arms and ammunition which you have been kind enough to send us. We also appreciate the many tips you have given us regarding our plans and intentions which we have carefully noted. In case you are concerned about the health of some of the visitors you have sent us, you may rest assured they will be treated with the consideration they deserve."
- 6 July. Andrée Borrel was one of four female SOE agents executed on this date by lethal injection at the Natzweiler-Struthof concentration camp. A prisoner in the camp described the women as "healthy and smartly dressed and might have walked in off any London or Paris street."
- 8 August SOE agents and Prosper associates Frank Pickersgill and Ken Macalister were among 37 SOE agents, including three women, transported to Germany by railroad. Most of the agents were executed at Buchenwald concentration camp.
- 25 August. The German garrison in Paris surrendered to Allied armies. All SOE agents captured in France had been transported to Germany by this date.
- 6 September. Gilbert Norman was executed at Mauthausen concentration camp
- 12 September. Noor Inayat Khan was executed at Dachau. An eyewitness said she had possibly been raped and was "terribly beaten" and a "bloody mess." She was shot in the back of the head by SS guard Wilhelm Ruppert who was later executed for war crimes by the Americans.
- 5 October. Henri Frager was one of several SOE agents executed by shooting on this date at Buchenwald.

== 1945 ==
- 23 March. Francis Suttill was hanged or shot on or about this date at Sachsenhausen concentration camp near Berlin where he had been held in solitary confinement in the prison block.
- 29 March. Jack Agazarian was executed at Flossenbürg concentration camp.
- 8 May. World War II ended in Europe with the surrender of Germany.
- 31 May. Abwehr Sergeant and spycatcher Hugo Bleicher, attempting to elude capture after Germany's defeat, was arrested in Amsterdam by Dutch militia. He was imprisoned and interrogated by the Canadians, British, and French but was released in late 1946 without being charged for any crimes. Bleicher had been responsible for the capture of more than one hundred SOE agents and French resisters.

== Post war ==
- 15 January 1946. SOE was abolished by the British government.
- 22 November 1946. Henri Déricourt was arrested by French police in Paris and charged with having had "Intelligence With the Enemy."
- January 1947. Vera Atkins, formerly SOE's intelligence officer, interviewed Josef Kieffer, former SD head in Paris, who had been captured after the war and was in an allied prison awaiting trial. Kieffer confirmed that Henri Déricourt had been a German agent of Karl Böemelburg, Kieffer's boss. Déricourt was known as BOE 48, Böemelburg's forty-eighth agent. However, Atkins' report of her interview with Kieffer was uncustomarily brief and vague. Kieffer did not confirm that he had made a pact of cooperation with Suttill or Norman, but said that Norman had "helped a lot" as had other SOE agents. Those agents who had not "helped" were Noor Inayat Khan, France Antelme, and Frank Pickersgill. Atkins' interview with Kieffer was conducted in the context of allegations being made in France that Suttill had betrayed his French associates. Moreover, the Suttill family was bitter at the lack of help and information given them by SOE. Author Helm speculated that Atkins manipulated and concealed information to coverup SOE's mistakes.
- 12 March 1947. A war crimes trial by the British convicted Kieffer of carrying out the order of his superiors to execute five British soldiers. The charge was unrelated to Kieffer's destruction of the Prosper Network. SOE agent John Starr, formerly a prisoner of Kieffer in Paris, was the only witness in Kieffer's defense. Starr said he and other prisoners were treated well and that he did not believe that Kieffer "would take part in the deliberate murder of British prisoners." Kieffer was sentenced to death.
- 26 June 1947. Josef Kieffer was hanged. Author Helm, Vera Atkins, and others have questioned Kieffer's death sentence while other Germans charged with more serious crimes were punished less severely. Furthermore, they asked questions as to why the British did not delay Kieffer's execution so he could tell what he knew about SOE agents and their cooperation with the Germans. Kieffer's extensive knowledge of SOE and the Prosper Network mostly died with him.
- 29 January 1948. Henri Déricourt, awaiting trial, wrote his wife, "they will have to release me for I have done nothing to be reproached for. The witnesses for the prosecution vanish one after the other and the accusations no longer have substance."
- 8 May 1948. Former SOE Deputy Nicolas Bodington testified in Déricourt's defense at his trial. Bodington said that SOE headquarters knew of Déricourt's contacts with the Germans, He said that "I had total trust in Déricourt and recommended he maintain his contacts with the Germans." Nobody from SOE showed up to testify against Déricourt, nor was Vera Atkins' report of her interview of Kieffer presented as evidence that Déricourt had been a German agent. Déricourt was acquitted—to the fury of many SOE agents, including Atkins, who believed he had betrayed SOE. It remains a mystery why no former officials or agents of the now defunct SOE testified against Déricourt at the trial.
- I January 1952. Madeleine: The Story of Noor Inayat Khan by Jean Overton Fuller was published, the first of several books by Fuller detailing the destruction of the Prosper Network.
- 21 November 1962. Déricourt was killed when the small plane he was flying ran out of gas and crashed on a flight from Vientiane to Sayaboury, Laos. Déricourt was involved in smuggling opium.

== Bibliography ==
- Cookridge, E. H. (1967). Set Europe Ablaze. New York: Thomas V. Crowell. Originally published in Great Britain as Inside S.O.E.
- Escott, Beryl E. (2010). The Heroines of SOE. Stroud, Gloucestershire: The History Press.
- Foot, M. R. D. (1976). SOE in France. London: Her Majesty's Stationery Office. Originally published in 1966. Republished in 2004.
- Fuller, Jean Overton (1975). The German Penetration of SOE. London: William Kimber.
- Glass, Charles (2018). They Fought Alone. New York: Penguin Press.
- Helm, Sarah (2005). A life in Secrets. New York: Anchor Books.
- King, Stella (1989). Jacqueline, Pioneer Heroine of the Resistance. London: Arms and Armour Press.
- Loftis, Larry (2019). Code Name: Lise. New York: Gallery Books. ISBN 9781501198656.
- Marnham, Patrick (2020). War in the Shadows. London: Oneworld Publications.
- Marshall, Robert (1989). All the King's Men. London: Fontana Paperback. Originally published in 1988.
- O'Connor, Bernard (2012). Churchill's Angels. Stroud, Gloucestershire: Amberly.
- O'Connor, Bernard (2018). SOE Heroines. Stroud, Gloucestershire: Amberly.
- Purnell, Sonia (2020). A Woman of No Importance. New York: Penguin Books. ISBN 9780735225312.
- Suttill, Francis J. (2018). Shadows in the Fog. Stroud, Gloucestershire: The History Press. Originally published in 2014.
- Verity, Hugh (2017). We Landed by Midnight. Manchester: Crecy Publishing. Originally published in 1978.
