= Josef Kieffer =

WW2 German SD intelligence officer (1900-1947)

Hans Josef Kieffer (4 December 1900 – 26 June 1947) was a Sturmbannführer (Major) and the head in Paris of the Sicherheitsdienst (SD), the intelligence agency of the SS during the German occupation of France in the Second World War. Kieffer's headquarters were at 84 Avenue Foch, an address that became well-known because many captured agents of the United Kingdom's clandestine Special Operations Executive (SOE) were interrogated there after their capture. After their interrogation, captured agents were sent to concentration camps in Germany, where most were executed. Kieffer was successful in penetrating and destroying SOE networks, which had as their objective fostering and supporting the French Resistance to the German occupation. Kieffer deceived SOE headquarters in London for many months in 1943 and 1944 by sending false wireless messages, a tactic known as funkspiel (the radio game).

In August 1944, Kieffer ordered the execution of five captured Special Air Service (SAS) soldiers under the authority of the Commando Order of the OKW (German military command), which stated that all Allied commandos were to be executed whether or not in uniform. In 1947, Kieffer was hanged by the British.

== Early life ==
Kieffer was born in Offenburg, Baden-Württemberg, on 4 December 1900. He became a policeman in Karlsruhe, and joined the Nazi Party in the 1920s. After it took power in 1933, he transferred to the Kripo, commanded by Reichsführer-SS Heinrich Himmler. Kieffer was promoted to SS-Obersturmführer on 12 September 1937, and SS-Hauptsturmführer on 14 July 1940. On 27 June 1940, shortly after the German conquest of France, he became a military field police officer, and was later sent to Paris to head the SD (intelligence agency). Kieffer's wife and three children, Hans, Gretel, and Hildegard, remained in Karlsruhe during World War II. Kieffer was described as a "good-looking man" and was short, stocky, and muscular with curly hair.

== Second World War ==
Kieffer's position as head of the SD in Paris was to conduct counter-espionage activities against the French Resistance and the SOE. In January 1943, Kieffer and his group moved into new offices at 84 Avenue Foch, which became the headquarters of the SD in Paris. Only high-value prisoners were sent to 84 Avenue Foch. Kieffer's assistants included Dr. Josef Goetz, a civilian who was a wireless expert, and Lt. Ernest Vogt, a translator and interpreter who spoke French, English and German. Kieffer spoke only German, and focused his operations on capturing and interrogating Allied agents, escaped prisoners-of-war and resistance fighters. His objectives included turning British and French SOE agents into double agents for the Germans, and transmitting false misinformation to SOE headquarters with wireless sets captured from Allied agents, a process that the Germans called "funkspiel", the "radio game" or Englandspiel, the "England game." Kieffer's office and quarters were on the fourth floor of 84 Avenue Foch. The fifth floor had cells (formerly servant's rooms) for prisoners under interrogation. Kieffer's immediate superior was Sturmbannführer Karl Bömelburg, head of the Gestapo in Paris, whose office was next door at 82 Avenue Foch.

Most captured SOE agents and other prisoners arrived at Kieffer's headquarters after several weeks of being terrorized by brutal treatment at the hands of the Gestapo and their French collaborators. Kieffer's tactic was to lull his prisoners into a feeling of safety and treat them as gentlemen and even friends. His most effective technique for breaking down a prisoners resistance to providing information was to demoralize them by demonstrating how much he knew about SOE; greeting prisoners by both their real names and code names, which were supposedly known only to SOE headquarters; showing them a wall chart of SOE's organization; suggesting that the Germans and British had a common interest in fighting communism; and planting in prisoner's minds the notion that they had been betrayed by infiltrators in high places in SOE.

The experience of the agent John Starr illustrates Kieffer's methods of getting information from the SOE agents he had in his custody. Starr was arrested by the Germans in Dijon on 18 July 1943. He was shot in the thigh and foot while he was trying to escape, and was beaten, tortured, starved, and transferred from prison to prison. Starr arrived at Avenue Foch in late September still on crutches. He was met by Vogt who, like Kieffer and most of his people, dressed in civilian clothes. Vogt gave Starr tea and lunch, and interrogated him in a friendly manner. He introduced Starr to Gilbert Norman, another SOE agent who was also a prisoner, and gave them a few minutes alone to chat. According to Starr, Norman told him that the Germans knew everything about SOE and that there was no point in hiding information. Norman also said that the Germans must have infiltrated SOE headquarters in London.

On the second day of interrogation, to bolster Starr's suspicion that SOE in London had been infiltrated and that the Germans knew everything about SOE, Vogt showed Starr copies of correspondence from SOE headquarters and field agents which the Germans had obtained. Starr admitted to a few things that Vogt already knew. Kieffer entered the interrogation at that point, showed Starr a large map of France, and asked Starr to draw a line around his area of operations. Starr did so. He was a graphic artist whose artistic lettering pleased Kieffer so much that he asked Starr to redraw the map. Starr agreed to do so and expanded his own area of operations to conceal the existence of SOE networks near his. Thus began Starr's collaboration with SD for which he was rewarded with a room of his own, permission to eat in the German officer's mess, and gifts of chocolate and cigarettes. Starr later claimed that he had never given any information of importance to Kieffer and had instead been gathering information on SD to provide to SOE. Starr also tried to escape but was recaptured.

Kieffer's sources of information on SOE allegedly included Henri Déricourt, a double agent who was in charge of arranging clandestine air flights to bring SOE agents to France and to return them to England. Agents gave Déricourt uncoded personal correspondence and official reports to send back by plane to England. He made copies and gave them to the Germans, which provided Kieffer with a wealth of personal information about SOE agents and their work.

Kieffer claimed that he did not permit torture of prisoners at his headquarters, but witnesses described torture of prisoners at a nearby prison under his jurisdiction and by some of his subordinates. According to historian Damien Lewis:

While Kieffer claimed not to sanction violence, in truth he oversaw a 'don't ask, don't tell' policy at 84 Avenue Foch. He expected his interrogators to get results. What means they employed to secure them were their own affair, and Avenue Foch boasted all the accoutrements of the dark art of torture.

=== Destroying Prosper ===
Kieffer's great accomplishment was the destruction of Prosper (or Physician), SOE's largest and most important network (or circuit) of agents. Based in Paris, Prosper operated from the "Ardennes to the Atlantic" with 30 SOE agents and hundreds of French resisters in its orbit. The three key personnel of Prosper were organiser (leader) Francis Suttill, wireless operator Gilbert Norman, and courier Andrée Borrel. The three had been chosen for SOE's "most challenging job: to establish a circuit in Paris, covering a vast chunk of central France".

Prosper's writ was to organize and supply with arms and equipment the many groups belonging to the fragmented French Resistance in anticipation of a 1943 invasion of France by the Allies, which did not occur until 6 June 1944. Prosper was too large, however, by involving too many people who congregated too often and in the same places for both professional and social reasons. On 24 June 1943, the three principals were arrested in Paris and taken directly to 84 Avenue Foch for interrogation. What follows next is disputed. At least one of Suttill or Norman (although Norman is more likely) is alleged to have made an agreement with Kieffer to tell him about Prosper's operations and the locations of its arms caches in exchange for Kieffer's word that captured SOE agents would not be executed but be sent to concentration camps in Germany. Whether such an agreement was made or not, the information gathered by Kieffer enabled the arrest of hundreds of French collaborators with Prosper and the confiscation of a large supply of arms. If an agreement was made to spare the lives of the captured, it was not observed. At least 167 persons were deported to Germany, and less than half of them survived the war. Included among the fatalities were Suttill, Norman, Borrel and 16 more SOE agents who were executed by the Germans.

About 13 October 1943, the SOE agent Noor Inayat Khan was captured by Kieffer. Unlike several other captured agents, she proved impervious to his interrogation. After the war, he testified to SOE spymaster Vera Atkins that Khan did not give him a single piece of information but lied constantly.

=== The radio game ===
Josef Goetz was the radio expert in Kieffer's headquarters. Along with the SOE agents captured, the Germans also captured the radios of several wireless operators, including that of Gilbert Norman. SOE headquarters in London was quickly informed by wireless operators still at large of the disappearance of Suttill. London, however, was reassured on 7 July when a wireless message arrived from Norman's wireless that said that Suttill had been captured but that Norman was still free. Goetz had sent the message or dictated it to Norman to send. However, the message omitted the security code, which should have told London that Norman was transmitting under duress. Instead, London rebuked him for forgetting his security code and thereby told Goetz how to send messages to SOE headquarters that would be accepted as authentic. According to Goetz, that incident caused Norman's resistance to co-operating with the Germans to crumble. With the captured wirelesses and knowledge of the need to include a security check in the messages, Goetz and Kieffer could play radio games ("Funkspiel" or "Englandspiel") with SOE headquarters. The practical results were that Goetz deceived SOE into air-dropping arms and equipment into German hands, who captured several SOE agents immediately upon their arrival in France and executed all of them.

By 6 June 1944, the date of the Normandy invasion, the radio game had become worn out, but the Germans could not resist taunting the British. Kieffer was ordered to wire his opposite number, Maurice Buckmaster, at the SOE. Kieffer said:

We thank you for the large deliveries of arms and ammunition which you have been kind enough to send us. We also appreciate the many tips you have given us regarding our plans and intentions which we have carefully noted. In case you are concerned about the health of some of the visitors you have sent us you may rest assured they will be treated with the consideration they deserve.

=== Killings of prisoners-of-war ===
On 4 July 1944, German forces, acting on intercepted radio messages, intercepted a group of 12 Special Air Service (SAS) soldiers of Operation Gain parachuting into France about 50 kilometres (31 miles) south of Paris. Seven of the SAS were captured and taken to Kieffer's headquarters where they were interrogated. Kieffer was ordered by SD headquarters in Berlin to shoot the prisoners in accordance with Hitler's Commando Order but to make it appear that they were civilian spies, as it was against the Geneva Convention to execute uniformed soldiers. On 8 August, the SAS soldiers were dressed in civilian clothes, told they were going to be exchanged for German prisoners and driven to a forest near Noailles. However, one of the SAS soldiers, a Czech, spoke German and realised they were to be executed. When they were lined up to be shot, the prisoners bolted and two escaped. It was the testimony of the escapees which resulted in Kieffer's trial and execution. Two SOE agents, Pierre Mulsant and John Barrett, attempted to help the SAS soldiers on their arrival in France, but were captured and later executed by the Germans.

Although this was the only known incident of Kieffer personally overseeing the killing of prisoners, he is believed to have been responsible for the murders of other captured SAS men. In November 1944 he intervened in the case of Dennis Reynolds and Andrew Whately-Smith, two British officers apprehended during Operation Loyton. Reynolds and Whately-Smith had been captured in uniform by Wehrmacht officers and treated as prisoners of war. Two days after their capture, Kieffer arrived and took personal charge of the two men, promising that he would protect them from being shot as spies, but instead took them to Schirmeck concentration camp where they were tortured and executed.

== Trial and execution ==
With the surrender of Germany in May 1945, Kieffer said goodbye to his wife, who was dying of cancer, and children, and went into hiding in Garmisch, where he worked as a cleaner at a hotel. Kieffer made little attempt to hide his identity other than spelling his last name as "Kiefer". According to his eventual captors, Kieffer's lack of concern for being identified was because he did not believe he had done anything wrong. He was captured by British soldiers in January 1947. In March 1947, he and five other defendants were put on trial for war crimes at Wuppertal in the British Occupation Zone for the execution of the five SAS prisoners. Kieffer claimed in his defence that he had been ordered to execute the prisoners, and that after the attempted assassination of Hitler on 20 July 1944, any German officer who disobeyed an order would be executed. To rebut this defence, the prosecution called Horst Kopkow, a representative of the Reich Security Main Office, who testified that no German officer had ever been executed for disobeying orders to kill prisoners.

Another key prosecution witness was Kathe Goldmann, Kieffer's former secretary at Avenue Foch. Goldmann testified that Kieffer had not initially been ordered to execute any of the prisoners, but rather than treating them as prisoners of war he had repeatedly sent messages to Berlin asking what should be done with them until eventually receiving orders to kill the prisoners within twenty-four hours.

One of Kieffer's interpreters from 84 Avenue Foch testified at his trial. He said, "Kieffer was not cruel" and that the interpreter had "seen him stop a guard from hitting a prisoner". The interpreter said that Kieffer did not want "maltreatment" but "wanted information." The interpreter also said that Kieffer had made a pact with Francis Suttill to trade information about the locations of other agents and supplies in exchange for a guarantee that those agents would be allowed to live, but all were instead executed after they had been sent to concentration camps in Germany.

The all-important question as to whether Suttill made a pact with Kieffer might have been answered by SOE's Vera Atkins, who interviewed Kieffer while he was imprisoned. Atkins was uncustomarily vague about what Kieffer said about collaboration between him and Suttill and other SOE agents. She reported only that Kieffer said Suttill "did not want to make a statement", not whether or not he did. She also reported that Kieffer said Norman "had not the character of" Suttill, which gave the impression that Norman was more malleable. At the time of that interview in 1947, the French were making accusations that Suttill had betrayed his French associates. Atkins and SOE neither confirmed nor denied the accusation. Suttill's family was bitter at the lack of support it had received from SOE.

John Starr was the only SOE witness and he testified in Kieffer's defense. Starr said that Kieffer had not mistreated prisoners and that he did not believe that Kieffer would "take part in the deliberate murder of British prisoners". Found guilty two hours later, Kieffer was sentenced to death by hanging alongside his superior Helmut Knochen and two subordinates, Richard Schnur and Karl Haug. Kieffer's appeal of the death penalty was refused and he was executed by hanging at Hamelin Prison by the British executioner, Albert Pierrepoint, on 26 June 1947. Schnur and Haug were hanged alongside him. Knochen, who had given the order to execute the SAS prisoners, had his death sentence commuted. Starr said he was told that the prosecutor expressed "astonishment" at the severity of Kieffer's sentence. Author Jean Overton Fuller, said "it did seem unfair that Kieffer, who had a certain amount of decency, should have been hanged" while Klaus Barbie, the "Butcher of Lyon," was not. The author Sarah Helm asked why the British and French did not request that Kieffer's execution be delayed so he could testify against the accused double agent Henri Déricourt. Helm also said that SOE's Vera Atkins expressed doubts to her about whether Kieffer should have been executed.

== Sources ==
- Foot, M.R.D. (1966). SOE in France. London: Her Majesty's Stationery Office. ISBN 978-0415408004.
- Ford, Roger (2004). Fire From the Forest. London: Cassell Military Paperbacks. ISBN 0304363367.
- Fuller, Jean Overton (1973). Conversations with a Captor. London: Fuller D'Arch Smith, Ltd. ISBN 9780903394017.
- Fuller, Jean Overton (1975). The German Penetration of SOE. London: William Kimber. ISBN 0718300645.
- Glass, Charles (2018). They Fought Alone. New York: Penguin Press. ISBN 9781594206177.
- Helm, Sarah (2005). A Life in Secrets. New York: Nan A. Talese. ISBN 9780385508452.
- Lewis, Damien (2020). SAS Band of Brothers. Quercus. ISBN 9781787475250.
- Suttill, Francis J. (2014). Shadows in the Fog. Stroud, Gloucestershire: The History Press. ISBN 9780750957625.
