= SOE in France =

1966 book by M.R.D. Foot

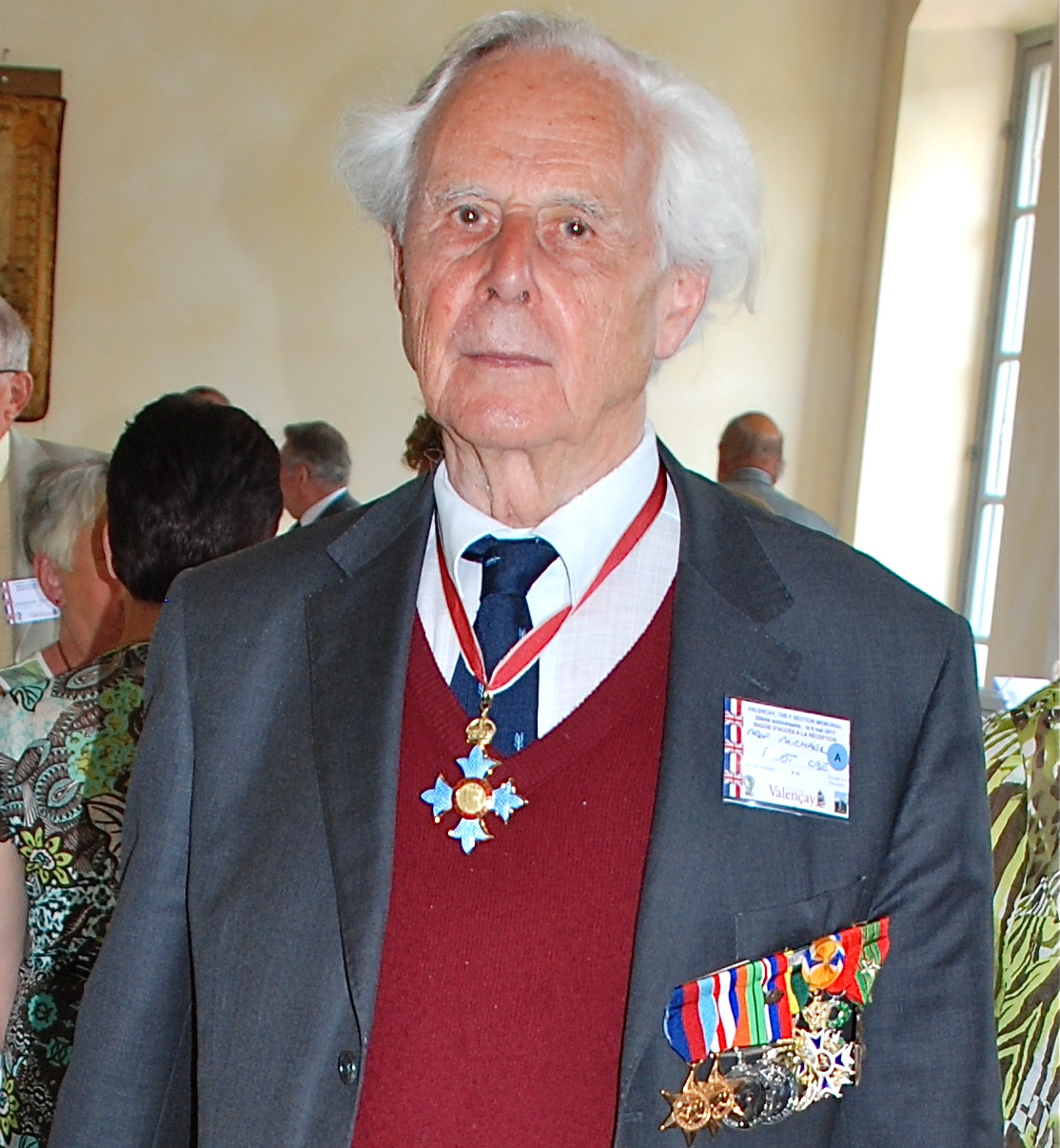
Michael R. D. Foot in 2011

SOE in France: An Account of the Work of the Special Operations Executive in France, 1940-1944 is a book authored by M.R.D. Foot. First published in 1966, SOE in France is an official history compiled from the records of the Special Operations Executive (SOE), a British organization dedicated to sabotage, espionage, and aid to resistance movements in German-occupied Europe during World War II. "Foot’s book is a comprehensive study and provides a thorough overview of SOE’s work in France...it still provides a source that is debated as much today as it was when it was written over 60 years ago." It is "an unrivaled reference book on the subject."

The publication of SOE in France was stimulated in part by criticism of the organization by authors such as Jean Overton Fuller and politicians such as Irene Ward. Moreover, the British government wanted "to highlight Britain's sizeable contribution in fermenting European resistance" and had a "need to counter both the American and Communist versions of the history of the European resistance," both of which were receiving far more attention among the public than the British. The publication of the book resulted in controversy and lawsuits. Two revised editions have been published, the most recent one in 2004.

== Background ==
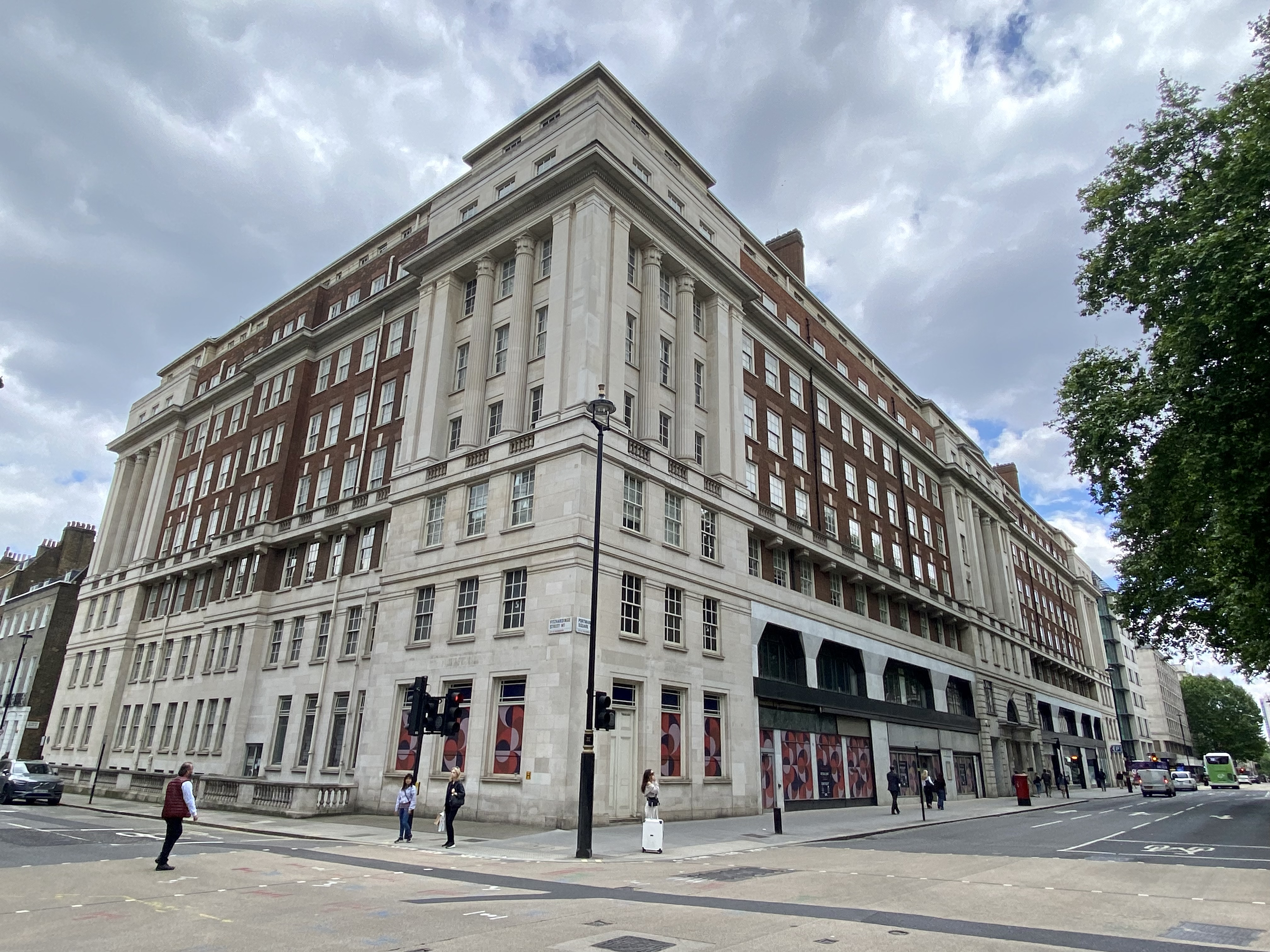
SOE leaders and agents often met in an apartment in Orchard Court, London.

The history of SOE is complicated by an absence of records. A fire at SOE headquarters in London in January 1946 destroyed many records. Over the years many more were weeded and destroyed by clerks. Author M.R.D. Foot estimated that by 1960 only about one-eighth of the records survived. Except for SOE in France, published information about SOE prior to the release of the remaining documents to historians and the general public in the 1990s and early 2000s was based on books by or interviews with former SOE agents and non-British sources.

Although SOE had 13,000 employees (including 3,200 women), its existence was unknown to the great majority of the British public during World War II. Public consciousness of the organization came to light after the war. Two early books by SOE agents, published in 1946, were Moondrop to Gascony by Anne-Marie Walters and Maquis by George Millar. (Foot described Walters' book as "pardonable exaggerations.") Walters' book won the John Llewellyn Rhys Prize. Walters and Millar were prevented by the Official Secrets Act from mentioning SOE, leaving the reader uninformed as to the name of the organization for which they worked. Author Kate Vigurs named SOE in France and the books by Walters and Millar as three of the five best books about SOE. Also, in 1946 the British Information Service released a movie related to SOE, Now it Can be Told (also titled School for Danger). The stars were former SOE agents in France, Harry Rée and Jacqueline Nearne, who were "better secret agents than thespians." SOE was not mentioned by name in the movie.

In the 1950s, author Jean Overton Fuller wrote three books detailing the fate and betrayal of SOE agents in France: Madeleine (about Noor Inayat Khan) in 1952, The Starr Affair (about John Starr) in 1954, and Double Webs (about double agent Henri Dericourt) in 1958. In 1956, British MP Irene Ward joined the chorus of criticism of SOE by demanding an official history of the organization. Later, she raised the issue of double agent Dericourt and took offense to statements in a book titled They Fought Alone by Maurice Buckmaster, SOE's F (French) Section leader. She stimulated an official inquiry into SOE which concluded that "striking successes [had been] balanced with disastrous failures" and recommended that an official history be compiled. On 17 March 1959, John Profumo, Undersecretary of State, announced a working party to consider an official history.

A motivating factor for publication was that Communist writers were claiming that Communists had spear-headed resistance to Nazi occupiers in Europe and the U.S. Office of Strategic Services chief, William J. Donovan, was exaggerating OSS successes in Europe, although in the British view OSS was a stepchild of SOE.

== Writing and publication ==
On 7 November 1960, Oxford University historian M.R.D. Foot was contracted to write a book about SOE from official documents. The writing was expected to take 18 months, but publication of his findings was not guaranteed. Foot was given an office in London and access to surviving SOE documents, but was denied permission to interview most former SOE personnel, including F section leader Buckmaster. He was also refused permission to consult archives in France.

In spring 1963, the manuscript of the book was distributed to government agencies for comments. Several comments were highly favorable, but others cited "objectional passages," such as criticizing French security, "gratuitous" statements about SOE personnel, and descriptions of rivalry among British agencies. Most critical was Maurice Buckmaster who objected to the "flippant" tone of the manuscript, unflattering descriptions of several SOE agents, and criticisms of his leadership. Foot removed some of his criticisms of SOE, "building up a more benign picture of F Section that focused less on the cold unvarnished truth, and more on the successes it had achieved." On 6 April 1964, the government approved with revisions the publication of SOE in France. The Prime Minister believed the publication would have three positive impacts: recognition of SOE agents, deflect interest from unofficial and often critical publications about SOE, and "counter the attempts by some countries" (the Soviet Union and the United States) to minimize British successes.

SOE in France was published in 1966 by Her Majesty's Stationery Office and was immediately acclaimed by British reviewers, although an American asked "Where were the Yanks?" a complaint about Foot's downplaying the contribution of the OSS to the French resistance in 1944. The French took offense to Foot's description of the "golden rule...never entrust a secret to the French except in dire necessity."

== Law suits ==
Despite the vetting of Foot's manuscript by several British government departments the book was controversial. The first edition of SOE in France was a best seller, but a second edition was delayed by two libel suits. Former SOE agent Odette Sansom was outraged by Foot's assertion that she lived in luxury on the French Riviera and his questioning her assertion that she had been tortured by the Nazis. Similarly, the author of Carve her Name with Pride took legal action because Foot had expressed doubt about the torture of another agent, Violette Szabo, who had been executed in a Nazi concentration camp. Foot apologized to Sansom and promised to amend future editions of the book. Each of the plaintiffs was given 5,000 pounds in damages by the British government. The government said that the book had been "profitable historically" but "embarrassing politically." The balance sheet showed a loss of 42,855 pounds in expenses.

Soe in France was republished with revisions in 1968 and in 2004.
