= Gilbert Norman =

British espionage agent (1915–1944)

Gilbert Maurice Norman
- Born: 7 April 1915; Saint-Cloud, Paris, France
- Died: 6 September 1944 (aged 29); Mauthausen concentration camp, Nazi Germany
- Military career
- Allegiance: United Kingdom
- Branch: British Army; SOE
- Service years: 1940–1944
- Rank: Major
- Service number: 156759
- Units: Physician/Prosper circuit
- Conflicts: World War II
- Awards: Mention in Despatches; Médaille de la Résistance

Gilbert Maurice Norman (7 April 1915 – 6 September 1944) , code name Archambaud, was an agent of the Special Operations Executive (SOE) in France during World War II. SOE was a British organisation formed in 1940 to conduct espionage, sabotage and reconnaissance in German-occupied Europe and to aid local resistance movements to the occupation. Norman was a wireless operator and second in command of Prosper, SOE's most important network in France. Norman parachuted into France in November 1942. He was captured in Paris by the Germans in June 1943 and executed in September 1944.

After his capture, Norman is alleged to have made an agreement with their German captors to assist them in the dismantling of Prosper. The agreement resulted in the capture of many SOE agents, French collaborators, and the confiscation of tons of military equipment which the British had provided to the French resistance. In exchange, the Germans agreed that captured agents would not be executed. The agreement was apparently honored in France, but most of the agents were transferred to German concentration camps in 1944 and were executed in that year and early 1945.

== Early life ==
Norman was born in 1915, in Saint-Cloud, Hauts-de-Seine, to an English father and a French mother and was educated in France and England. He joined the army, receiving a commission in the Durham Light Infantry in November 1940 and was subsequently recruited into the Special Operations Executive (SOE). Norman was considered an "ideal recruit" for SOE with "great qualities of leadership and physical endurance." He was "handsome, gray-eyed and swarthy, mustacioed and capable."

== Prosper ==
The Prosper or Physician network was SOE's most important network in France. Based in Paris, Prosper's three core members were Francis Suttill, the organizer and leader, Norman, a wireless operator and second in command, and Andrée Borrel, a courier whose spoken French was better than either Suttills or Normans. Borrel and Suttill preceded Norman to France. Borrel and Norman reputably became lovers in France.

On the night of 31 October/1 November 1942, Norman parachuted into France near Saint-Laurent-Nouan, about 150 km (93 miles) southeast of Paris. Norman carried with him a poison pill to kill French resister Pierre Culioli. SOE agent Raymond Flower had accused Culioli of being a double agent. Neither Norman nor any other SOE agent was willing to administer the pill. Culioli subsequently created the small Adolph Network which became a sub-network of Prosper.

Based in Paris, the Prosper network enjoyed success in attracting French resisters to Nazi occupation over a large area of northern France. Within a few months almost 30 SOE agents and hundreds of French resisters were working under the Prosper umbrella. Hundreds of canisters of weapons and military equipment were dropped by the Royal Air Force to arm the resistance and to prepare for the invasion of France by American and British armies. (The invasion did not occur until June 1944.) However, the network grew too large to be secure; the leaders had too much visibility and contact with each other and other members of Prosper. Security was poor. It was a case, said author Vance, of professional policemen, the German Sicherheitsdienst (SD), chasing amateur agents. The Germans apparently had been aware of Prosper for several months before they finally decided to suppress the network.

The capture and captivity of SOE agents, Suttill, Norman, Borrel and others, has been the subject of many historians with different interpretations, including conspiracy theories, about the events. The British government was close-mouthed for many years about Prosper and the fate of SOE agents, although the facts were slowly teased out during the 1950s by authors Jean Overton Fuller and Elizabeth Nichols and politician Irene Ward. The official history, SOE in France, authored by M.R.D. Foot, was first published in 1966 and later revised.

== Capture and captivity ==
Norman was a reliable and accurate wireless operator. To ensure his security, he changed locations frequently. He lived for a time with Borrel's sister and later with a childhood friend named Laurent. On the night of 23 June 1943, Borrel and Norman were captured by the Germans while coding messages in the Laurent's apartment near the Rue de la Pompe metro station. They had been followed there by the SD. The Germans also captured Norman's wireless and his codes which would enable them to communicate with SOE headquarters in London. Suttill was captured the next morning. Only Norman and Borrel knew his location, although it is possible that he had been followed by the Germans.

As high value prisoners, the Germans took Norman, Borrel, and Suttill to 84 Avenue Foch, the headquarters of Josef Kieffer, the SD's head of counter-intelligence in Paris. They were subjected to several days of intense interrogation. Kieffer's interrogation tactics were to break down a prisoner's resistance to providing information by demonstrating how much he knew about SOE; greeting prisoners by both their real and code names, which were supposedly known only to SOE headquarters; showing them a wall chart of SOE's organization; suggesting that the Germans and British had a common interest in fighting communism; and planting in prisoner's minds the notion that they had been betrayed by infiltrators in high places in SOE.

The British government's official SOE historian, M.R.D. Foot, said that one of the agents "cracked" and the evidence pointed to Gilbert Norman. The Germans wanted to conceal from the British the fact that they were destroying the Prosper network. They used captured wirelesses to misinform SOE headquarters with messages supposedly from SOE agents. Feigning cooperation, Norman attempted to reveal to SOE that he had been captured. On 29 June he helped the Germans send a wireless message to London. To show the authenticity of messages, wireless operators had two "checks" they inserted into messages. Norman omitted one of the checks, the secret "true check". If the true check was missing, it meant that the agent was either not the transmitter of the message or was transmitting the message under duress. Instead of believing what the missing check signified, SOE instead responded by chastising Norman for forgetting to insert the true check and telling him to do better next time. The egregious error by SOE headquarters, according to Josef Goetz, SD's wireless expert, was what pushed Norman "over the margin of doubt and into practical co-operation" with the Germans.

As Norman did not survive the war to defend himself, most of the evidence that he collaborated with the Germans came from post-war statements by his German captors. Interviewed after the war, Kieffer said only that Suttill "did not want to make a statement", but Norman "had not the integrity of Prosper". Wireless expert Goetz said that Norman "had been quite helpful..., especially as regards the moral effect his appearance on apparently good terms with his captors, had on agents captured later."

Kieffer and Norman (and possibly Suttill) allegedly concluded a "pact" for Norman's cooperation with the Germans. The terms of the alleged pact were that the Germans would allow all captured SOE agents to live if Norman would identify the agents and French collaborators in the Prosper network and lead the Germans to stores of arms and military equipment which had been parachuted into France by SOE. Several SOE agents later recounted incidents of Norman cooperating with the Germans. For example, Andrée Borrel's brother-in-law, Robert Arend, said that Norman came to his home with three Germans, confiscated his wireless, and sent him to prison in Buchenwald concentration camp. Foot estimates that the total number of people captured by the Germans in the suppression of Prosper may have reached 400. If a pact existed, the Germans did not observe it after prisoners were sent to German concentration camps. Many of those captured in 1943 were executed in 1944 or 1945 or died in German camps.

Several captured SOE agents said that Norman told them that Suttill had approved of the pact although there is little evidence that Suttill approved or knew of it. While Norman was given access to other captured SOE agents, Suttill was kept in isolation and sent to Germany about 8 July. Suttill was thus not present in France for most of the time that the destruction of Prosper was accomplished.

By mid-July 1943, SOE headquarters in London realized that Suttill, Borrel, and others had been captured by the Germans, but believed that Gilbert Norman was still free because of wireless messages received ostensibly from him. On 23 July SOE Deputy Nicolas Bodington and radio operator Jack Agazarian arrived in France by clandestine aircraft to investigate the status of Prosper. They were met on the ground by Henri Déricourt, a double agent whose SOE code name was "Gilbert." (The coincidence of two Gilberts, Norman and Déricourt, has caused problems for historians.) Bodington and Agazarian proceeded to Paris. Through radio contacts and notes supposedly from Norman, Bodington and Agazarian set up a meeting with him at a Paris apartment. Suspicious of treachery, only Agazarian went (or was sent by Bodington) to the apartment where, instead of Norman, Germans met and captured him. After Agazarian's capture, Bodington stayed in Paris for another two weeks and made contact with a few surviving SOE agents, although most were also soon captured. Agazarian was later executed.

During the winter of 1943-44, Norman was transferred from 84 Avenue Foch to Fresnes Prison in Paris. During the transfer, he attempted to escape from his German escorts but was shot in the leg during his attempt. The Germans later transported him to Mauthausen concentration camp in Germany, where he was executed on 6 September 1944.

Major Gilbert Norman is honoured on the Brookwood Memorial in Surrey, England, and is also on the "Roll of Honour" on the Valençay SOE Memorial in the town of Valençay, in the Indre departément of France.

== See also ==
- Timeline of SOE's Prosper Network

== Bibliography ==
- Sarah Helm (May 2005). A Life in Secrets: The Story of Vera Atkins and the Lost Agents of SOE. London: Little, Brown. ISBN 0-316-72497-1.
