= Madeleine (book) =

- Author: Jean Overton Fuller
- Language: English
- Subject: Biography
- Genre: History
- Publisher: Victor Gollancz
- Publication date: 1952
- Publication place: United Kingdom

Madeleine is a biography of Noor Inayat Khan, authored by her close friend Jean Overton Fuller, and first published by Victor Gollancz in 1952. It was initially rejected by six of seven publishers Fuller submitted it to, but eventually had some success and was reprinted in 1971, with added detail of Khan's ancestry.
