= Helmut Knochen =

SS officer and Holocaust perpetrator (1910–2003)

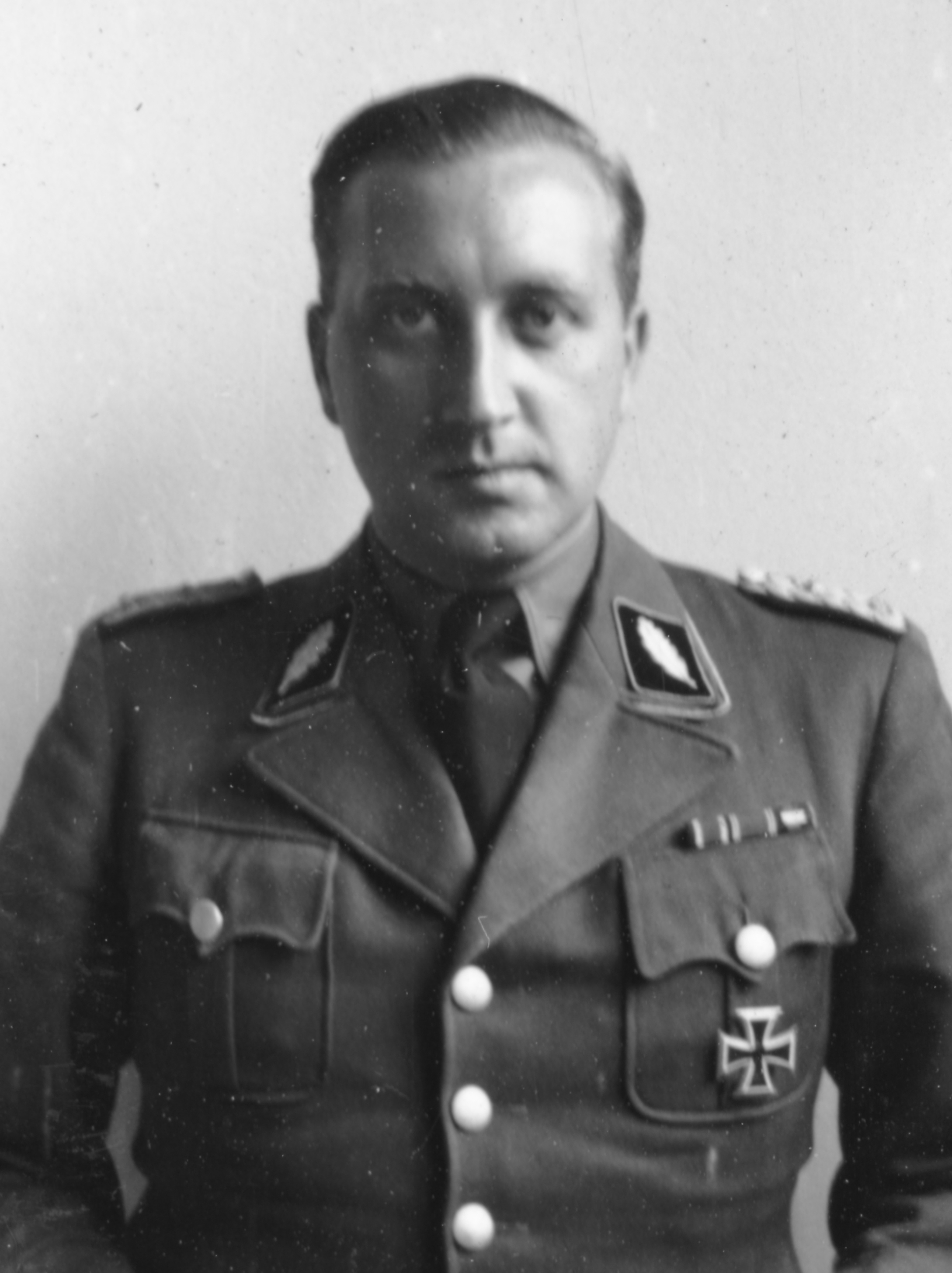
- Knochen, c. 1942
- Born: 14 March 1910; Magdeburg, Province of Saxony, Kingdom of Prussia, German Empire
- Died: April 4, 2003 (aged 93); Offenbach am Main, Hesse, Germany
- Education: PhD
- Alma mater: University of Göttingen
- Status: Deceased
- Convictions: British Military; War crimes French Military; War crimes
- Penalty: British Military; Death; commuted to life imprisonment; further commuted to 21 years imprisonment French Military; Death; commuted to life imprisonment
- SS service
- Allegiance: Nazi Germany
- Branch: Schutzstaffel; Waffen-SS
- Service years: 1936–1945
- Rank: SS-Standartenführer
- Unit: Reich Security Main Office
- Commands: Commander of SiPo and SD, France
- Awards: Iron Cross, 1st and 2nd class

Helmut Herbert Christian Heinrich Knochen (March 14, 1910 – April 4, 2003) was the senior commander of the Sicherheitspolizei (Security Police; SiPo) and Sicherheitsdienst (SD) in occupied France during World War II. He was sentenced to death for war crimes by a British military court in 1946, and by a French military court in 1954. His sentences were commuted and reduced, and he was pardoned and released by French President Charles de Gaulle in 1962.

== Early life ==
Knochen was born in Magdeburg, the son of a school teacher. At age sixteen, his father enrolled him in Der Stahlhelm a right-wing paramilitary group. Knochen excelled academically, and he attended Leipzig University, the University of Halle and the University of Göttingen, earning a doctorate in medieval English literature in 1935. Even before the Nazi seizure of power, he joined the Sturmabteilung (SA) and the Nazi Party (membership number 1,430,331) on 1 January 1933. He also became head of the National Socialist German Students' League in Göttingen in the same year, and worked as an editor in the Party's press agency.

== Career in the SS ==
Knochen joined the Schutzstaffel (SS) (member number 280,350) on 1 September 1936 and was assigned to its intelligence service, the Sicherheitsdienst (SD). For the next 3 years, he was assigned to its office for foreign intelligence, where he studied the refugee press of France, Belgium and the Netherlands. In November 1939, he was involved in the Venlo incident in which 2 British intelligence agents were kidnapped, and for which he was awarded the Iron Cross. During the Battle of France, Knochen led a special commando unit in June 1940. After France's defeat, he stayed on as the SD representative in Paris to maintain surveillance on Communists, Jews, Freemasons and other perceived enemies of the Nazi regime. However, he ran into opposition from the military administration of General Otto von Stülpnagel. In command of his own 2,500 field military police, Stülpnagel resented the SD intrusion into his jurisdiction and severely limited its freedom of action.

Knochen returned to Germany at the beginning of 1941 as head of the department for reconnaissance of ideological opponents abroad (IV E) in Amt VI of the Reich Security Main Office (RSHA). In May 1942, he was promoted to the rank of SS-Standartenführer and he returned to France as the Befehlshaber der Sicherheitspolizei und des SD. He was involved in combating partisans and in hunting down and destroying resistance groups. He was responsible for the execution of hundreds of French resistance fighters and the arrest and torture of dozens of British SOE agents. Knochen also was involved in deporting French Jews to Nazi concentration camps. In this, he encountered opposition from the Italian troops occupying southern France. On 2 occasions in February and March 1943, they prevented the deportation to Germany of Jews in Lyon and Annecy. Knochen complained that: "Throughout France, the 'Final Solution of the Jewish question' decreed for the whole of Europe is being seriously hampered by the Italian position." He appealed to the Wehrmacht authorities, including Generalleutnant Günther Blumentritt, the chief of staff to the OB West (Commander-in-Chief, West) who refused to intervene.

During the 20 July 1944 plot to assassinate Hitler, Knochen and his superior, the Higher SS and Police Leader of France SS-Gruppenführer Carl Oberg, were arrested by army troops under the command of General Carl-Heinrich von Stülpnagel, a supporter of the conspirators. After the coup collapsed, they were released from custody. Just before the liberation of Paris by the Allies, Knochen was removed from his post on 18 August by RSHA Chief Ernst Kaltenbrunner, and he was transferred to the Waffen-SS. He was demoted to the rank of SS-Grenadier and assigned to the 1st SS Division Leibstandarte SS Adolf Hitler.

== Post-war trials, sentences, and reprieve ==
After Germany's surrender in May 1945, Knochen went into hiding. He was discovered and arrested at Kronach in Bavaria in January 1946. He was incarcerated at Dachau and testified as a witness at the Nuremberg trials. In June 1946, a British military court sentenced Knochen, alongside Hans Kieffer, to death for the murder of a number of British parachute troops on or about 9 August 1944. In 1947, he was extradited to France where, in October 1954, he was sentenced to death by a military tribunal. The sentence was commuted to life imprisonment in April 1958 and further reduced to 20 years at hard labor in December 1959. A pardon was issued by French President Charles de Gaulle and Knochen was released on 28 November 1962, together with his former chief Carl Oberg. Repatriated to Germany, he retired to Baden-Baden where he worked in the insurance industry. He died in 2003, at age 93, in Offenbach am Main.

== In popular culture ==
- The Eye of Vichy, a French documentary film directed by Claude Chabrol where Knochen himself appeared
- Les Bienveillantes, a 2006 historical fiction novel written in French by Jonathan Littell, where Helmut Knochen is featured meeting the main character Maximilian Aue.
- Field Gray, a 2010 fiction novel by Philip Kerr where Knochen featured.
- 93 Rue Lauriston, a 2003 TV Film about French Gestapo.
- The Great Arrangement, a 2007 TV Film about the collaborator Rene Bouquet.
