= Orchard Court =

Coordinates: 51.5160°N 0.1546°W

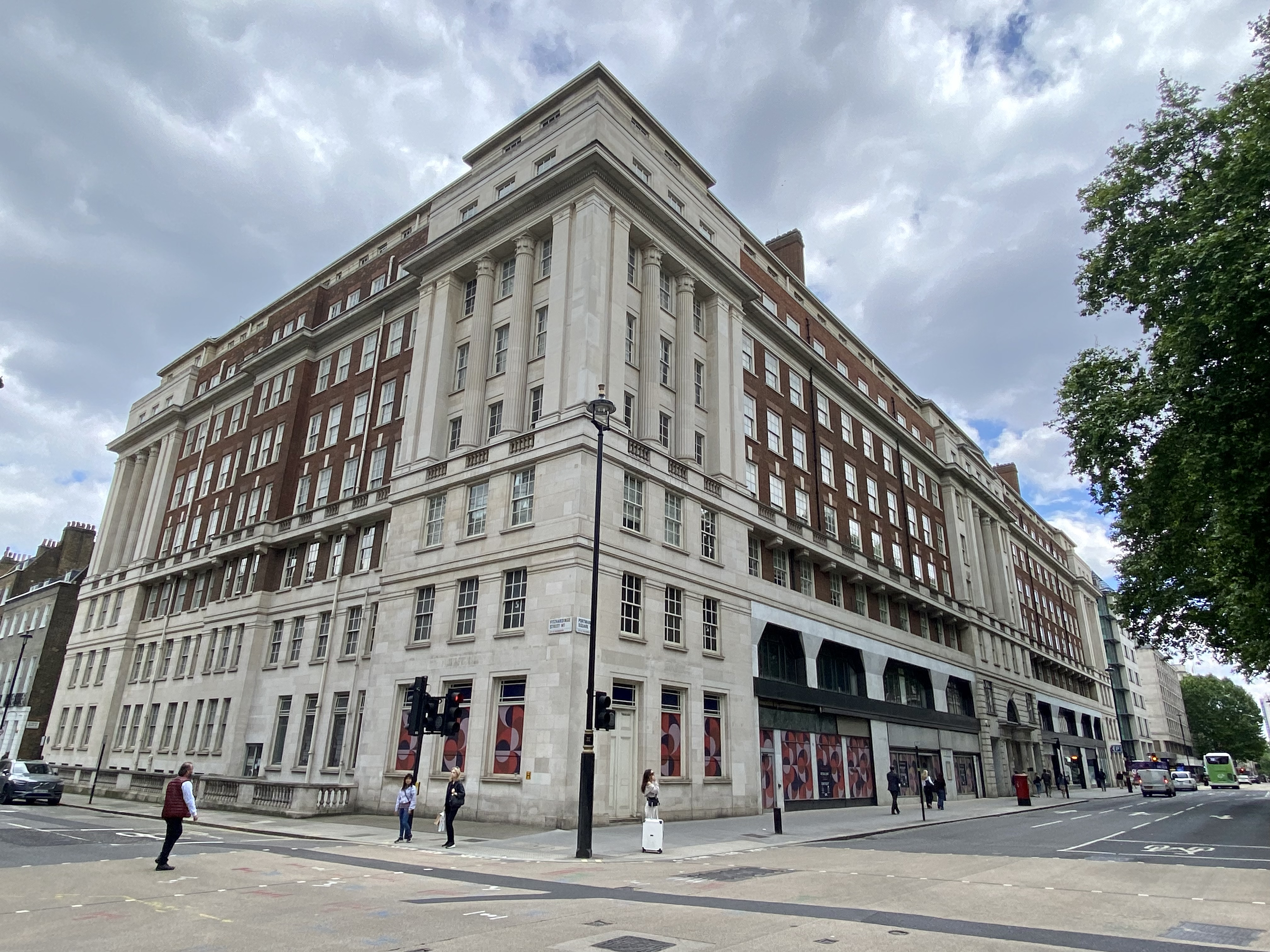
Orchard Court, Portman Square, in June 2024

Orchard Court is an apartment block in Portman Square in Marylebone, London. The building occupies the entire eastern side of the square, bordered by Fitzhardinge Street to the north and Wigmore Street to the south.

== History ==
The building was erected within the Portman Estate by the Prudential Assurance Company on the eastern side of Portman Square during the late 1920s, replacing the large aristocratic townhouses which had lined the square since its creation. Completed in 1929, its first tenants took up residency in the building in 1930. The chairman of the Prudential Assurance Co Sir Edgar Horne hosted large reception at the building on 8 July 1930 to mark its completion.

== Architecture and design ==
The building was designed by the firm Messrs Joseph, and its spacious interious were designed the cater for wealthy tenants. Apartments in the building ranged in size from three-bedroom and two-bathroom options to larger seven-bedroom and three-bathroom flats, with annual rents initially ranging from £750 to £1,300. Each apartment was fitted-out with a range of features considered to be on the cutting-edge of modern living at the time, including hot-and-cold water basins, electric cookers, build-in cupboards with automatic electric lighting, as well as jewellery safes built into some bedroom walls.

== Occupants ==
Apartment No. 6 was used by F section of the Special Operations Executive as an office for briefing agents during the Second World War. The section commander Maurice Buckmaster and his Deputy Vera Atkins reportedly inspired the characters "M" and Miss Moneypenny in Ian Fleming's James Bond series.

== Sources ==
- Michael Richard Daniell Foot, SOE in France. An account of the Work of the British Special Operations Executive in France, 1940-1944, London, Her Majesty's Stationery Office, 1966, 1968; Whitehall History Publishing, in association with Frank Cass, 2004. Ce livre présente la version officielle britannique de l’histoire du SOE en France. Une référence essentielle sur le SOE.
- Peter Churchill, Missions secrètes en France, 1941-1943, Presses de la Cité, 1967.
- Marcel Ruby, La Guerre secrète. Les réseaux Buckmaster, Éditions France-Empire, 1985.
