= The Starr Affair =

1954 book by Jean Overton Fuller

- First edition
- Author: Jean Overton Fuller
- Language: English
- Publisher: Victor Gollancz
- Publication date: 1954
- Publication place: United Kingdom
- Media type: Print
- Pages: 222
- OCLC: 11007499

The Starr Affair is a 1954 book written by Jean Overton Fuller. It was published by Victor Gollancz.

It tells the story John Renshaw Starr, an officer of the British Special Operations Executive sent to establish the Acrobat Network in north-eastern France during the Second World War. He was subsequently captured, tortured and imprisoned in Fresnes prison, at 84 Avenue Foch and in Sachsenhausen and Mauthausen concentration camps.

It is based on the subject's own account of his activities, captivity and survival and the subsequent investigations concerning his suspected collaboration with the enemy.
