= Jean Overton Fuller =

British author, poet and mystic

- Born: 7 March 1915; Iver Heath, Buckinghamshire, England
- Died: April 8, 2009 (aged 94); Kettering, Northamptonshire, England

Jean Violet Overton Fuller (7 March 1915 – 8 April 2009) was a British author, poet, mystic, and painter. She is best known for her book Madeleine, the biography of Noor Inayat Khan, an agent of the clandestine Special Operations Executive (SOE) during the Second World War. Noor was executed after she was captured by the Germans. Fuller wrote additional books about SOE, bringing to light the failures of the organization in France during World War II. Fuller also wrote several literary biographies and a book about the identity of Jack the Ripper. She was a painter and poet and, in her youth, an actress.

Critical books about SOE by Fuller and Elizabeth Nicholas, plus inquiries by politician Irene Ward, led to the decision by the British government to publish an official history titled SOE in France.

== Early life ==
Fuller was born in Iver Heath, Buckinghamshire on 7 March 1915, the posthumous and only child of an Indian Army officer killed in World War I. Brought up to think for herself by her mother, who was an artist, and a grandfather who was a retired Army doctor she early developed a wide field of interests. Following a short-lived career as a repertory actress she studied phonetics, linguistics and astronomy, and graduated with honours from the University of London. In the 1930s she became a member of the poetry circle of Victor Benjamin Neuburg, whose biography she later wrote. During the Second World War, she was employed by the British Postal Censorship Office in London. Later, in 1947–8, she studied at the Académie Julian in Paris.

Author Sarah Helm described Fuller in 1949 as "a petite young woman with short, cropped auburn hair and a plain but pleasant face".

== SOE books ==
After the end of World War II in 1945, former SOE agents wrote books about their experiences and accounts appeared in movies and magazines. The emphasis of the publicity, fostered by SOE's former leaders Maurice Buckmaster and Vera Atkins, was on heroics and the tragedy of agents who were executed by the Germans. Unknown to the public were the blunders, often fatal to SOE agents and SOE operations, until Fuller published books on SOE in the 1950s. Fuller was sceptical of government secrecy, dating back to when the British government concealed details about the death of her father.

Fuller was a friend and neighbour of Noor and of the Inayat Khan family. The details of Noor Inayat Khan's work during World War II were unknown until confirmed by the award to her of a posthumous George Medal in 1949. Later than year, Fuller travelled extensively throughout Europe, interviewing people connected with Noor and the SOE, including former German intelligence agents. The resultant publication, Madeleine, first published in 1952, was re-published in 1988. This updated version contains some chapters that were removed from the original manuscript, such as an in-depth exploration of Tipu Sultan, Noor's ancestor. Until the publication of Shrabani Basu's Spy Princess: The Life of Noor Inayat Khan Fuller's book was the definitive biography of Noor Inayat Khan.

Fuller's second SOE book, The Starr Affair (1954), told of the experiences of SOE agent John Renshaw Starr who, after his capture and imprisonment, was accused of collaboration with the Germans. Fuller defended Starr and discovered an "inconvenient secret: the radio game". The Germans had captured radios from captured agents and fed SOE headquarters false information leading to the capture of many SOE agents and weapons. SOE headquarters in London had failed to recognise indications that its communications with agents in France were controlled by the Germans.

In 1958, Fuller published Double Webs which focused on alleged double agent Henri Déricourt and the infiltration and destruction by the Germans of the Prosper network, SOE's most important network in France. Included in the book were extensive interviews with Déricourt. He admitted having contacts with German intelligence agencies, but said SOE headquarters was aware of those contacts. Fuller speculated that sinister motives, such as competition among British clandestine organisations, had led to Prosper's fall, but concluded that the cause was likely incompetence. She said that SOE was an "amateur" organisation headed by "amateurs." She asked the question: "What qualifications...had young girls like Denise (Andrée Borrel) and Madeleine (Noor Inayat Khan) to pick their way in that complex underworld into which they were dropped?"

Fuller's books plus Death be not Proud by Elizabeth Nicholas and demands by politician Irene Ward helped persuade the British government to commission an official history of SOE titled SOE in France (1966) by historian M. R. D. Foot.

Fuller's fourth book, The German Penetration of SOE: France 1941-1944 (1975) was a history of SOE in France. It followed Foot's official history. Fuller's judgement of SOE was harsh. SOE was "an awkward hybrid," part military, part civilian. its headquarters was overstaffed, which led to an emphasis on quantity rather than the quality of its work. It was "the darker side of Churchill's historic injunction to 'set Europe ablaze'". She continued: "The work of SOE was sabotage...acts violent in themselves, bound to invite violent responses [by the Germans] upon the civilian population." She cited several examples of retributions to SOE actions by the German occupiers against innocent civilians.

Fuller continued her research into SOE with Déricourt: The Chequered Spy (1989). Fuller's pioneering inquiries into SOE history led to a large literature about SOE and its successes and failures in France.

== Other works ==
In 1970 Fuller founded the publishing firm Fuller d'Arch Smith together with Timothy d'Arch Smith. The company employed the poet and writer Martin Booth as Poetry Editor. In 1974 Booth was instrumental in finding Fuller a house in Wymington, which became the company's new registered office. Prior to this she had been living in a flat in Whitfield Street, North Soho.

Fuller also wrote several other biographies, notably of Percy Bysshe Shelley, Algernon Charles Swinburne, Sir Francis Bacon, Victor Neuburg and a book detailing her theory of Jack the Ripper's true identity as Walter Richard Sickert, an English painter. Jean Overton Fuller's memoirs were published in 2007 by Michael Russell, Wilby, Norwich under the title Driven To It, An Autobiography.

== Later life ==
She died in Kettering on 8 April 2009 at the age of 94.

== Bibliography ==
- Madeleine, Victor Gollancz, 1952.
- The Starr Affair, Victor Gollancz, 1954.
- Double Webs, 1958, Putnam & Co., 1958.
- Double Agent?, Pan Books Ltd, 1961.
- The Magical Dilemma of Victor Neuburg, W.H. Allen, 1965.
- Shelley, A Biography, Jonathan Cape, 1968.
- Swinburne, A Critical Biography, Chatto & Windus, 1968.
- Noor-un-nisa Inayat Khan (Madeleine) – reprinted with much additional material. East-West Publications in association with Barrie & Jenkins Ltd, London, 1971.
- The German Penetration of SOE, William Kimber, 1975.
- Sir Francis Bacon: A Biography, East-West Publications, 1981; George Mann, 1994.
- The Comte de Saint-Germain, East-West Publications, 1988.
- Blavatsky and Her Teachers, Theosophical Publishing House, 1988.
- Dericourt, The Chequered Spy, Michael Russell, 1989.
- Cats and Other Immortals, Fuller d'Arch Smith, 1992.
- The German Penetration of SOE, George Mann, 1996.
- Espionage as a Fine Art by Henri Dericourt. Translated from (previously unpublished) French original stories with an Introduction and Commentary, Michael Russell, 2002.
- Sickert and the Ripper crimes: An investigation into the relationship between the Whitechapel murders of 1888 and the English tonal painter Walter Richard Sickert, Mandrake 1990, 2nd revised edition 2003.
- Krishnamurti & The Wind, Theosophical Publishing House, 2003.
- Driven To It, Michael Russell, 2007.

== Archives ==
Fuller's papers, including a significant collection of letters between herself and Martin Booth, are held at the Cadbury Research Library, University of Birmingham.
