= John Renshaw Starr =

British artist

John Ashford Renshaw Starr (6 August 1908 – 1996), code names Emile and Bob, was a British artist and an agent in France of the United Kingdom's clandestine Special Operations Executive (SOE) organization during World War II. He was the organiser (leader) of the Acrobat network (or circuit) which operated in Dijon. The purpose of SOE in occupied France was to conduct espionage, sabotage and reconnaissance. SOE agents allied themselves with French Resistance groups and supplied them with weapons and equipment parachuted in from England.

Starr was wounded and captured by the German SS on 18 July 1943 and imprisoned for the remainder of the war. After World War II, Starr was accused by several other SOE agents of collaboration with the Germans while he was a captive. John Starr's brother George Starr was also an SOE agent.

== Early life ==
Starr was born in Heaton Moor, Lancashire, the son of an American father, Alfred Demarest Starr, a bookkeeper who became a naturalised British subject, and an English mother, Ethel Renshaw, he was a grandson of William Robert Renshaw. He studied art in Paris and in 1934 he married a French woman, Michelle Vergetas, and the couple had one child, Ethel. Starr tried to join the Royal Air Force in 1938 but was rejected because his father was an American. He was in Paris when World War II began in 1939, and in early 1940 joined the King's Own Scottish Borderers and later was assigned to the Field Security Police. After the German invasion of France, he escaped to England when France was overrun by Nazi Germany. He joined the SOE in early 1941.

== Special Operations Executive ==
=== First Mission ===
Starr parachuted "blind" (without being met on the ground) near Valence on the night of 27–28 August 1942. His job was to evaluate the food requirements for the CARTE network, a resistance group which claimed that, with SOE support, it could raise an army of 300,000 men to resist the German occupation of France. Starr made his way from Valence to a villa in Cannes where he met SOE agent Peter Churchill and CARTE leader André Girard. Starr learned from Churchill and his own experience that CARTE was largely a fantasy of Girard's. He returned to England in November. Oddly enough, as he was boarding a small boat to slip out of France, he encountered his older brother George who was arriving in France as an SOE agent.

=== Second Mission ===
Starr was held in high regard by SOE and, along with a wireless operator, John Young, he parachuted into France again on the night of 15–16 May 1943, landing near Blye in the French Alps. He was designated as the organiser (leader) of the Acrobat network, operating around Saint-Étienne and Dijon. Shortly after his arrival, Starr narrowly escaped being captured in Clermont-Ferrand. The Germans had penetrated several SOE networks and captured agents in that area. Starr was joined in Acrobat by saboteur Harry Rée and courier Diana Rowden. Rée soon departed for another network. He did not like Starr's "assertive manner" and believed the network was insecure.

=== Capture and collaboration ===
On 18 July 1943 Starr was captured by the Germans after being betrayed by a Frenchman he had recruited. He attempted to escape en route to a prison in Dijon and was shot twice in the thigh and foot. He was placed in the custody of the Sicherheitsdienst (or SD), the intelligence service of the SS. In Dijon, he said the Germans tortured him by beating on his wounded thigh but he didn't reveal any significant information to them. He was transferred to Fresnes Prison in Paris and in late September to SD headquarters at 84 Avenue Foch in Paris.

The head of the Paris SD was an ex-policemen named Hans Josef Kieffer, a man more dedicated to persuasion than torture. Kieffer persuaded Starr to use his artistic talents to redraw a map and some charts of SOE operations in France. In return, Starr was given a private room in the building and dined in the officer's mess which served excellent food in food-short France. Another SOE prisoner at 84 Avenue Foch was Gilbert Norman who told Starr that the Germans knew everything about SOE and that nothing he said would be news to them. Starr justified his cooperation with the SD by saying he was gathering information on SD operations that would be useful to SOE if he could escape. Along with SOE wireless operator, Noor Inyat Khan, and a French colonel, Leon Faye, he tried to escape in late 1943 by climbing out the skylight of his room onto the roof of the building, but the three were recaptured minutes after their escape. Kieffer threatened to shoot them, but relented on condition that they gave their word of honor not to attempt another escape. Inayat Khan and Faye declined; but Starr gave his word. Inayat Khan and Faye were sent to concentration camps in Germany and later executed.

After the escape attempt, Starr again became friendly with the Germans, even going out to restaurants with some of them and on an operation to identify the bodies of British airmen who had been shot down near Paris. He helped the SD send bogus wireless messages by correcting spelling and editing mistakes. The Germans he worked with later described him as "weak and misguided rather than knowingly treacherous."

=== A German concentration camp ===
Starr remained at Avenue Foch until August 1944 when, after the Normandy Invasion and with allied armies approaching Paris, he was transported to the concentration camp at Sachsenhausen near Berlin. According to his account he avoided execution in 1945 due to a quarantine resulting from a typhus outbreak within the camp. The opportunity arose to smuggle himself into a group of prisoners who were being transferred to the Mauthausen concentration camp near Linz. By using his ability to pass himself off as a Frenchman, he joined a group of French and Belgian prisoners who were released into the custody of the Red Cross and taken to Switzerland as the war in Europe drew to a close.

== Post World War II ==
Starr testified at the war crimes trial of Hans Josef Kieffer. He said that Kieffer had not mistreated prisoners and that he did not believe that Kieffer would "take part in the deliberate murder of British prisoners." Kieffer was found guilty and hanged.

Stories from other SOE agents who shared his captivity at Avenue Foch resulted in doubts being raised about Starr's loyalty, and his case became the subject of an MI5 investigation, which concluded that although his behaviour was suspicious, there were no grounds for criminal prosecution. After the war, Starr opened a night-club in Hanley, Staffordshire, with Alfred and Henry Newton, SOE agents (and brothers) whom he had met during his training and also at the Avenue Foch. The brothers had been at Buchenwald concentration camp. Starr later returned to live in Paris, then moved to Switzerland where he died in 1996.

== Bibliography ==
- The Starr Affair was a book written by Jean Overton Fuller and published in 1954 by Victor Gollancz.
