= Vera Atkins =

Romanian-born British intelligence officer

Vera Atkins CBE
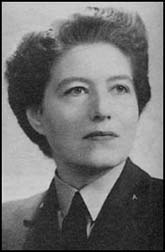
- Squadron Officer Vera Atkins, WAAF, in 1946
- Born: Vera May Rosenberg; 15 June 1908; Galați, Kingdom of Romania
- Died: 24 June 2000 (aged 92); Hastings, Sussex, England
- Occupation: SOE F Section intelligence officer
- Height: 5 ft 9 in (1.75 m)
- Relatives: Rudolf Vrba (cousin)

Vera May Atkins CBE (15 June 1908 – 24 June 2000) was a Romanian-born British intelligence officer who was the Deputy Director of the France Section (F Section) of the Special Operations Executive (SOE) from 1941 to 1945 during the Second World War.

== Early life ==
Atkins was born Vera May Rosenberg in Galați, Kingdom of Romania, to Max Rosenberg (d. 1932), a German-Jewish father, and his British-Jewish wife, Zefra Hilda, known as Hilda (d. 1947). She had two brothers.

Atkins briefly attended the Sorbonne in Paris to study modern languages and a finishing school at Lausanne, where she indulged her passion for skiing, before training at a secretarial college in London. Atkins' father, a wealthy businessman on the Danube Delta, went bankrupt in 1932 and died a year after. Atkins remained with her mother in Romania until emigrating to the United Kingdom in 1937, a move made in response to the threatening political situation in mainland Europe.

During her youth in Romania, Atkins became close to the anti-Nazi German ambassador, Friedrich Werner von der Schulenburg (executed after the July 1944 plot). Later, Atkins became involved with a young British pilot, Dick Ketton-Cremer, whom she had met in Egypt, and to whom she may have been briefly engaged. He was killed in action in the Battle of Crete on 23 May 1941. Atkins was never to marry, and lived in a flat with her mother while working for SOE and until 1947 when Hilda died.

While in Romania, Atkins came to know several diplomats who were members of British Intelligence, some of whom were later to support her application for British nationality, and to whom in view of her and her family's strong pro-British views, she may have provided information as a "stringer". Atkins also worked as a translator and representative for an oil company.

The surname "Atkins" was her mother's maiden name and itself an Anglicised version of the original "Etkins", which she adopted as her own. She was a cousin of Rudolf Vrba.

Atkins was recruited before the war by Canadian spymaster Sir William Stephenson of British Security Co-ordination. He sent her on fact-finding missions across Europe to supply Winston Churchill (then in the 'political wilderness') with intelligence on the rising threat of Nazi Germany.

== First missions of the Second World War ==
Atkins' first mission was to get Poland's cryptologists Marian Rejewski, Jerzy Różycki, and Henryk Zygalski out of the country. The trio were part of the Polish Cipher Bureau that broke Germany's Enigma ciphers from 1932 on, using Enigma-machine reconstructions. In July 1939, they had provided French and British cryptologists information on their decrypting techniques and the special-purpose equipment they had invented. Atkins was a member of the British military mission (MM-4), alongside Colin Gubbins, which arrived in Poland posing as civilians, by way of Greece and Romania, six days before the outbreak of the Second World War.

In the spring of 1940, before joining SOE, Atkins travelled to the Low Countries to provide money for a bribe to an Abwehr officer, Hans Fillie, for a passport for her cousin, Fritz, to escape from Romania. Atkins was stranded in the Netherlands when the Germans invaded on 10 May 1940, and, after going into hiding, was able to return to Britain late in 1940 with the assistance of a Belgian resistance network. This was kept secret and it only came to light after her death when her biographer, Sarah Helm, tracked down some mourners at Atkins' funeral.

Atkins volunteered as an Air Raid Precautions warden in Chelsea in the period prior to working for SOE. During this time she lived at Nell Gwynn House in Sloane Avenue in Chelsea.

== Special Operations Executive (SOE) ==
Though not a British national, in February 1941 Atkins joined the French section of the Special Operations Executive as a secretary. She was soon made assistant to section head Colonel Maurice Buckmaster, and became a de facto intelligence officer. Atkins served as a civilian until August 1944, when she was commissioned as a Flight Officer in the Women's Auxiliary Air Force (WAAF). In February 1944, Atkins was naturalised as a British subject. She was later appointed F Section's intelligence officer (F-Int).

Atkins' primary role at SOE was the recruitment and deployment of British agents in occupied France. She also had responsibility for the 39 women SOE agents who worked as couriers and wireless operators for the various circuits established by SOE. Atkins would take care of the "housekeeping" related to the agents, such as checking their clothing and papers to ensure they were appropriate for the mission, sending out pre-written anodyne letters at regular intervals, acting as SOE's liaison with their families, and ensuring they received their pay.

== Controversy ==
Controversy has lasted in certain circles (Note: See Pierre Reynaud, as quoted in Helm 2005, pp. 366–367.) as to how and why clues that one of F section's main spy networks had been penetrated by the Germans were not picked up, and Buckmaster and Atkins failed to pull out agents at risk. Instead, they sent in several more. A radio operator for the Prosper circuit, Gilbert Norman ("Archambaud"), had sent a message omitting his true security check – a deliberate mistake. Atkins, it is alleged, (Note: See Overton Fuller, Jean, 'The Starr Affair' (1954), as quoted in Helm 2005, pp. 359–361.) was negligent in letting Buckmaster repeat his errors at the expense of agents' lives, including 27 arrested on landing whom the Germans later killed.

Sarah Helm suggests Atkins, who still had relatives in Nazi-occupied Europe, may have been defensive about her involvement with the Abwehr in the 1940 rescue of her cousin Fritz Rosenberg, something she kept secret from SOE. Furthermore, as a Romanian who had not yet obtained British citizenship, Atkins was legally an enemy alien and highly vulnerable. Whatever the truth, Buckmaster was Atkins' superior officer, and thus ultimately responsible for running SOE's French agents, and she remained a civilian and not even a British national until February 1944. It was Buckmaster who sent a reply to the message supposedly sent by Norman telling him, and thus the actual German operator, he had forgotten his "true" check and to remember it in the future.

On 1 October 1943, F-Section received a message from "Jacques", an agent in Berne, passing on information from "Sonja" that "Madeleine" and two others had had "a serious accident and were in hospital" – code for captured by the German authorities. "Jacques" was an SOE radio operator, Jacques Weil of the Juggler circuit, who had escaped to Switzerland, "Sonja" was his fiancée, Sonia Olschanezky, who was still operating in Paris, and "Madeleine" was Noor Inayat Khan, a wireless operator of the Cinema circuit. This accurate information was not acted upon by Buckmaster, probably because "Sonja" was a locally recruited agent unknown to him, and F-Section continued to regard "Madeleine's" messages as genuine for several months after Noor's arrest. There is no evidence that Atkins was aware of this message, and as she was later to misidentify Sonia as Noor because she was unaware the former was an SOE operative, the responsibility for ignoring Sonia's communication and continuing to send agents to the blown Prosper circuit and sub-circuits in Paris, and so to their capture and often death, must lie with Buckmaster and not Atkins, as with the case of "Archambaud" above.

It was not until after the end of the war where Atkins learned of the almost total success the Germans had had by 1943 in destroying SOE networks in the Low Countries by playing the Englandspiel ("England game"), by which radio operators were captured and forced to give up their codes and "bluffs", so that German intelligence (Abwehr in the Netherlands; Sicherheitsdienst (SD) in France) officers could impersonate the agents and play them back against HQ in London. For some reason, Buckmaster and Atkins were not informed of the total collapse of the circuits in the Netherlands (N Section) and Belgium (T Section) due to the capture and control of wireless operators by the Abwehr.

This may have been a result of inter-departmental or service rivalry, or just bureaucratic incompetence, but the failure of their superiors to tell F Section officially of these other SOE disasters (although rumours about N and T Sections circulated at Baker Street) may have led Buckmaster and Atkins to be overconfident in the security of their networks and too ready to ignore signals evidence that questioned their trust in the identity of the wireless operator.

It has been suggested Atkins' diligence in tracing agents still missing at the end of the war was motivated by a sense of guilt at having sent many to deaths that could have been avoided. It is also possible she felt it her duty to find out what had happened to the men and women, each known personally to her, who had died serving SOE F Section in the most dangerous of circumstances.

In the end, what caused the complete collapse of the Prosper circuit of Francis Suttill and its extensive network of sub-circuits, were not errors in London, but the actions of Henri Déricourt ("Gilbert"), F Section's air-landing officer in France, who was at the heart of its operations, and who was literally giving SOE's secrets to the SD in Paris. What is not completely clear is whether Déricourt was, as is most likely, simply a traitor, or, as he was to claim, was working for the Secret Intelligence Service (MI6) (unknown to SOE) as part of a complex deception plan in the run-up to D-Day. However, it is beyond doubt Déricourt was at least a double agent, and had provided, first his friend, Karl Boemelburg, head of the SD in France, and then Kieffer, with large amounts of written evidence and intelligence about F Section's operations and operatives, which ultimately led to the capture, torture and execution of scores of British agents.

The conclusions of M.R.D. Foot in his official history of F Section are that errors made by Atkins, Buckmaster and other London officers were the products of the "fog of war", that there were no conspiracies behind these failings, and few individuals were culpable. Sara Helm's conclusions are the errors were due to "terrible incompetence and tragic mistakes".

Atkins never admitted to making mistakes, and went to considerable lengths to hide her errors, as in her original identification of Noor Inayat Khan, rather than (then unknown to Atkins) Sonia Olschanezky, as the fourth woman executed at Natzweiler-Struthof on 6 July 1944. Indeed, Atkins never informed Sonia's family that Sonia had died at Natzweiler, although she did later protest against the decision of the organizing committee of the SOE memorial in Valençay not to include Sonia's name because she was a local agent and not one sent from England.

== Search for F Section's missing agents ==
After the liberation of France and the allied victory in Europe, Atkins went to both France, and later to Germany for four days, where she was determined to uncover the fates of the fifty-one still unaccounted for F Section agents, of the 118 who had disappeared in enemy territory (117 of whom she was to confirm had died in German captivity). Originally she received little support and some opposition in Whitehall, but as the horrors of Nazi atrocities were revealed, and the popular demand for war crimes trials grew, it was decided to give official support for Atkins' quest to find out what had happened to the British agents and to bring those who had perpetrated crimes against them to justice.

At the end of 1945 SOE was wound up, but in January 1946 Atkins, now funded on the establishment of the Secret Intelligence Service (MI6), arrived in Germany as a newly promoted Squadron Officer in the Women's Auxiliary Air Force to begin her search for the missing agents, including 14 women. Atkins was attached to the war crimes unit of the Judge Advocate-General's department of the British Army HQ at Bad Oeynhausen, which was under the command of Group Captain Tony Somerhaugh.

Until her return to Britain in October 1946, Atkins searched for the missing SOE agents and other intelligence service personnel who had gone missing behind enemy lines, carried out interrogations of Nazi war crimes suspects, including Rudolf Höss, ex-commandant of Auschwitz-Birkenau, and testified as a prosecution witness in subsequent trials. In November 1946, Atkins' commission was extended so she could return to Germany to assist the prosecution in the Ravensbrück trial which lasted into January 1947. She used this opportunity to complete her search for Noor Inayat Khan, who she now knew had not died at Natzweiler-Struthof, as she had originally concluded in April 1946, but at Dachau.

As well as tracing 117 of the 118 missing F Section agents, Atkins established the circumstances of the deaths of all 14 of the women, twelve of whom had perished in concentration camps: Andrée Borrel, Vera Leigh, Sonia Olschanezky (whom Atkins did not identify until 1947, but knew as the fourth woman to be killed) and Diana Rowden executed at Natzweiler-Struthof by lethal injection on 6 July 1944; Yolande Beekman, Madeleine Damerment, Noor Inayat Khan and Eliane Plewman executed at Dachau on 13 September 1944; Denise Bloch, Lilian Rolfe and Violette Szabo executed by shooting at Ravensbrück on 5 February 1945, and Cecily Lefort executed in the gas chamber at the Uckermark Youth Camp adjacent to Ravensbrück sometime in February 1945. Yvonne Rudellat died of typhus on 23 or 24 April 1945, eight or nine days after the liberation of Bergen-Belsen, and Muriel Byck had died of meningitis in hospital in Romorantin, France, on 25 May 1944. Atkins had also persuaded the War Office the twelve women, technically regarded as civilians, who had been executed, were not treated as having died in prison, as had been originally intended, but were recorded as killed in action.

Atkins' efforts helped to ensure that each of the missing agents (except Sonia Olschanezky, unknown to Atkins until 1947) received official recognition by the British Government, including the award of a posthumous George Cross to both Violette Szabo in 1946 and Noor Inayat Khan in 1949. (Odette Sansom, who survived Ravensbrück, also received the GC in 1946.) However, when Atkins did confirm that Sonia Olschanezky had died at Natzweiler-Struthof, she failed to pass the information to Sonia's family.

== After the Second World War ==
Atkins was demobilised in 1947, and although nominated for an MBE, was not awarded a decoration in the postwar honours lists.

Atkins went to work for UNESCO's Central Bureau for Educational Visits and Exchanges, as office manager from 1948, and director from 1952. She took early retirement in 1961, and retired to Winchelsea in East Sussex.

In 1950, Atkins was an advisor on the film Odette, about Odette Sansom (by the then wife of Peter Churchill), and in 1958 on the film of Carve Her Name With Pride, based upon the biography of the same name of Violette Szabo by R. J. Minney. She also assisted Jean Overton Fuller on her 1952 life of Noor Inayat Khan, Madelaine, but their friendship cooled after the author revealed the success of the German Funkspiel against F Section in her 1954 book, The Starr Affair, and Overton Fuller later came to believe Atkins had been a Soviet agent.

Atkins was also suspected by some former SOE officials of working for the Germans, but Sarah Helm dismissed these claims of her being a Soviet or Nazi spy and suggested Atkins' less straightforward behaviour and secrecy can be explained by her determination not to reveal her 1940 mission to the continent. Her position as a woman, a Jew and a non-British national in SOE would also explain Atkins' defensiveness during and after the war. Nevertheless, especially given her pre-war contacts and activities, her position does not rule out the possibility either.

Atkins persuaded M. R. D. Foot, SOE's official historian, not to reveal her Romanian origins in his history. She remained to her death a strong defender of F Section's wartime record, and ensured that each of the 12 women who had died in the three Nazi concentration camps of Natzweiler-Struthof, Dachau and Ravensbrück are commemorated by memorial plaques close to where they were killed. Atkins also supported the memorial at Valençay in the Loire Valley, unveiled in 1991, which is dedicated to the agents of SOE in France killed in the line of duty.

In 1996, Atkins wrote to The Daily Telegraph to defend the decision to send Noor Inayat Khan to France, writing of Noor's initial success in evading capture, her two escape attempts, and her detention in Pforzheim prison manacled in chains as a dangerous prisoner: "This is the record of Noor Inayat Khan and her answer to those who doubted her."

== Honours and decorations ==
Atkins was appointed CBE in the 1997 Birthday Honours. She was awarded the Croix de Guerre in 1948 and made a Knight of the Legion of Honour by the French government in 1987.

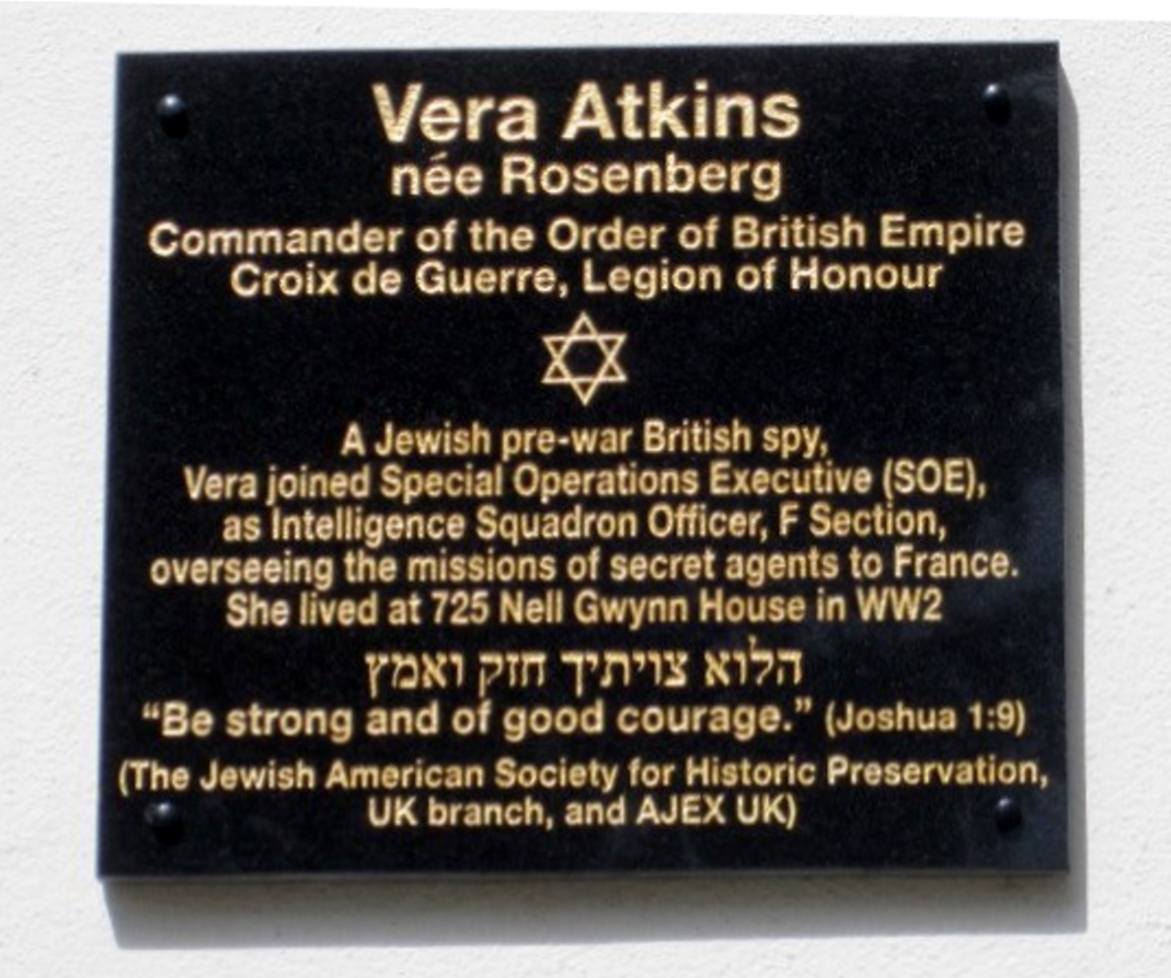
Vera Atkins historical marker – Spymaster WWII

In 2022, a historical plaque was placed at Nell Gwynn House, near Sloane Square, London, where Vera lived during World War Two, by the Jewish American Society for Historic Preservation, UK Branch, and the (British) Association of Jewish Ex-Servicemen and Women, Stamford Hill Branch.

== Death ==
Atkins died at a hospital in Hastings on 24 June 2000, aged 92. She had been in a nursing home recovering from a skin complaint when she fell and broke a hip. Atkins was admitted to the hospital where she contracted MRSA.

Her memorial plaque, which is shared with her brother Guy, is in the northern wall at St Senara's churchyard in Zennor, Cornwall where her ashes were scattered. The inscription reads "Vera May Atkins, CBE Légion d'honneur Croix de guerre". An attempt by AJEX Archivist (Association of Jewish Ex-Servicemen and Women of the UK) and author, Martin Sugarman, who interviewed Vera in Winchelsea for his chapters on Jews in SOE in his book Fighting Back, on 24 April 1998, to have a Star of David metal peg placed at her memorial at Zennor on a visit in 2012, was refused by the family via the vicar of the church when Sugarman visited the church and plaque. Vera also refused to allow Sugarman to tape her interview at the time and even though she understood fully why he was interviewing her as having known all the agents, and the two – Bloch and Byck, he was specifically writing about, she never revealed she was Jewish and he did not discover this till her obituary was published two years later. Leo Marks, the Jewish Chief of Codes at SOE, who Sugarman also interviewed the same year, 1998, also never let on that Vera was Jewish.

== In popular culture ==
- Recorded radio interviews with Atkins, in which she relates her experiences regarding the agents she sent into France, are used in Into the Dark, a short film directed by Genevieve Simms. This award-winning 16-minute documentary has been uploaded by the director to Vimeo.
- Atkins is the subject of the "Fatal Femmes" episode of the Secret War documentary series, aired in the United States on the Military Channel.
- She was played by Avice Landone in the 1958 film Carve Her Name with Pride, on which she acted as an advisor.
- The Faith Ashley character in the 1980s ITV television series Wish Me Luck is loosely based on Atkins, though there are few similarities between them beyond her role in the organisation she works for.
- Atkins was played by Stephanie Cole in the BBC Radio 4 drama "A Cold Supper Behind Harrods" by David Morley.
- She is the basis for the character of Hilda Pierce in Foyle's War.
- The 2012 play The Secret Reunion by Adrian Davis is about five SOE women holding a London reunion in 1975: Atkins, Nancy Wake, Odette Sansom Hallowes, Virginia Hall and Eileen Nearne.
- Atkins is the basis for Diana Lynd in Susan Elia MacNeal's novel The Paris Spy (2017) and for Eleanor Trigg in Pam Jenoff's novel The Lost Girls of Paris (2019).
- Atkins is the basis for Evelyn Ash in the musical The Invisible: Agents of Ungentlemanly Warfare scripted by Jonathan Christenson.
- Atkins is portrayed by Stana Katic in the 2020 movie, A Call to Spy.
- Atkins' search for the truth about Noor Inayat Khan is the subject of the 2022 play S.O.E. by Deborah Clair.
- Atkins is played by Sian Altman in the 2024 six-part docudrama Lost Women Spies, which is about the life and role in the SOE of Vera Atkins

== Bibliography ==
- Binney, Marcus (2002). The Women Who Lived for Danger: The Women Agents of SOE (1st ed.). London: Coronet Books. ISBN 978-034081840-4.
- "A Cold Supper behind Harrods". BBC Radio 4. 7 September 2012.
- "Fatal Femmes". Secret War. Season 1. Episode 9. 28 February 2012. Military Channel.
- Faulder, Liane (10 February 2020). "Review: The Invisible, Agents of Ungentlemanly Warfare challenges stereotypes about women and war". Edmonton Journal.
- Foot, Michael R. D. (2008) [First published 2004]. "Atkins, Vera May". Oxford Dictionary of National Biography (online ed.). Oxford University Press. doi:10.1093/ref:odnb/74260. (Subscription, Wikipedia Library access or UK public library membership required.)
- Helm, Sarah (May 2005). A Life in Secrets: The Story of Vera Atkins and the Lost Agents of SOE. London: Little, Brown. ISBN 0-316-72497-1.
- King, Stella (1989). Jacqueline: Pioneer Heroine of the Resistance. Arms and Armour Press. pp. 394, 399.
- Kozaczuk, Władysław (1984), Kasparek, Christopher (ed.), Enigma: How the German Machine Cipher Was Broken, and How It Was Read by the Allies in World War Two, Frederick, MD: University Publications of America, ISBN 978-0-89093-547-7. (The standard reference on the Polish part in the Enigma-decryption epic.)
- MacNeal, Susan Elia (2017). The Paris Spy. New York: Bantam. pp. 297–298. ISBN 978-110196599-3.
- "Revealed: the secret female army that spied for Britain". The Independent. 11 May 2003.
- Stevenson, William (November 2006). Spymistress: The Life of Vera Atkins, the Greatest Female Secret Agent of World War II. Arcade Publishing. ISBN 978-1-55970-763-3 – via Internet Archive.
