= Maurice Buckmaster =

British special operations officer (1902–1992)

- Born: 11 January 1902; Brereton, Staffordshire
- Died: 17 April 1992 (aged 90); Forest Row, East Sussex
- Military career
- Allegiance: United Kingdom
- Branch: British Army
- Service years: 1940–1946
- Rank: Colonel
- Units: British Expeditionary Force; 50th Infantry Division
- Commands: French section F, SOE
- Battles / operations: Battle of France; Operation Menace
- Awards: See below

Maurice James Buckmaster OBE (11 January 1902 – 17 April 1992) was the leader of the French section F of the British Special Operations Executive (SOE) during World War II. The purpose of SOE was to conduct espionage, sabotage and reconnaissance in countries occupied by the Axis powers. SOE agents in France created or allied themselves with French Resistance groups and supplied them with weapons and equipment via parachute. From 1941 to 1944 under Buckmaster's leadership, SOE F Section sent about 470 agents into France which was occupied by Nazi Germany. Ninety-one men and 13 women were killed, executed, or died in concentration camps while working as agents in France.

Apart from his war service, Buckmaster was a corporate manager with the French branch of the Ford Motor Company, in the postwar years serving in Dagenham. He wrote two memoirs about his work with the SOE.

== Early life and career ==
Maurice Buckmaster was born on 11 January 1902 at Ravenhill, Brereton, Rugeley, Staffordshire, England, the son of Eva Matilda (daughter of R. B. Nason, M.D., of Nuneaton, Warwickshire) and Henry James Buckmaster, a company director running a brewery. He grew up at Marsham Lodge, Gerrards Cross. He was educated at Eton College from 1915 to 1920. Buckmaster was awarded an exhibition (scholarship) to study Classics at the University of Oxford, but was unable to attend due to his father's financial problems.

Buckmaster was allowed to stay on at Eton for a final year through a scholarship and by tutoring younger boys, and from that point onwards was entirely dependent on his own resources. After doing some teaching he made his way to France where he became fluent in the language and gained a reporter's position with the French newspaper Le Matin Later he moved into banking for six years where, at Schroeders, he met his future wife May Dorothy Steed (born in 1904). They married in 1927 and had three children, one boy and two girls. The marriage ended in divorce in 1941. In 1929, Buckmaster began his employment with the Ford Motor Company. From 1932 to 1935, he managed Ford SA France and from 1936 to 1939 he headed the European Department at Dagenham.

In Chelsea, London in November 1941, Buckmaster married Anna Cecilia Stevenson (née Reinstein). She was the daughter of a Bavarian German hairdresser brought up in East London, and the former wife of the barrister Melford Stevenson.

== Soldier ==
When World War II broke out, Buckmaster joined the British Army and on 14 October 1939 was commissioned to the General List as a lieutenant (service number 101877). He joined the British Expeditionary Force and fought in France until the retreat to Dunkirk, evacuating on one of the last boats out on 2 June 1940. On his return from France, Buckmaster transferred from the General List to the Intelligence Corps with effect from 15 July 1940 and was promoted to temporary captain.

Following this, Buckmaster was an intelligence officer with 50th (Northumbrian) Infantry Division, which he decided to leave after the division was scheduled to move to the Middle East. He was involved in Operation Menace in September 1940, a failed attempt to seize the port of Dakar in former French territory. Following a meeting with Gerald Templer, he was recruited into Special Operations Executive (SOE), or MO1(SP). On 20 December 1940, his services in the Battle of France and at Dunkirk were recognized and he was mentioned in dispatches. The official record shows his rank as second lieutenant acting major.

== Special Operations Executive ==
In spring 1941, Buckmaster with the rank of Major joined SOE's French section. He was trained, assigned briefly to T-Section (Belgium), then appointed head of the French Section in November 1941. This section recruited agents from among those Frenchmen who had not chosen to directly ally themselves with General Charles de Gaulle. A separate section of SOE, RF Section, worked with those members of the French Resistance who were Gaullist in their loyalties. There was often tension between F and RF sections.

At the time F Section had a headquarters staff of only eight persons and a handful of agents in France. Within a year Buckmaster increased his headquarters staff to 24 persons backstopping a growing number of agents on the ground in France. Buckmaster's staff was charged with recruiting and managing the work of field agents. Training, communications, administration, logistics, and transportation for agents was handled by other sections of SOE. SOE's highly-secret headquarters was at 64 Baker Street in London. However, agents never visited that office but instead were met, briefed, and de-briefed at a four-bedroom apartment at Orchard Court. The black-tiled bathroom in the apartment has gone down in legend as the meeting place of London staff and agents.

Buckmaster's task was to find, recruit, and dispatch to France (by parachute, landings at clandestine airfields, or small boats) "men and women who could pass for French, who would prepare tasks of sabotage and subversion that would assist an eventual British armed re-entry into France", occupied by Nazi Germany since June 1940. The objective was to create and supply French resistance forces which would aid the Allied invasion of France. SOE infiltrated 470 agents into France during the war. Some agents were there only a few weeks; others stayed in France for more than a year. One hundred and four agents were killed, executed, or died during their missions. A few more were captured by the Germans but survived the war.

The invasion was hoped for in 1943, but did not take place until June 1944. Days after the invasion SOE launched a joint project called Operation Jedburgh with the American Office of Strategic Services (OSS), and the Free French Bureau Central de Renseignements et d'Action (BCRA). Ninety-three teams of three soldiers each were parachuted into France to bolster the French resistance. SOE agents already on the ground in France assisted the Jedburghs.

With most of France freed from German occupation in August 1944, Buckmaster and a few SOE agents set up an office called JUDEX (the name of a fictional French hero) in Paris. The JUDEX mission was partly public relations and partly searching for missing SOE agents and rewarding French associates. Later, SOE intelligence officer Vera Atkins ferreted out information about 13 missing female SOE agents and collected details about their deaths at the hands of the Nazis. Buckmaster was promoted to Colonel in that fall.

=== Appraisal ===
In the official history of "SOE in France" (HMSO), a part of the series of campaign histories commissioned by the British government, author M.R.D. Foot wrote of Buckmaster, "He was a colourful and in many ways a controversial figure; he was not universally popular, but no better head for the section was ever in sight." Sarah Helm said SOE agents described him as gullible and naive, and his boss Gubbins was quoted as saying that he headed F section "because there was nobody else." Author Kate Vigurs said "for all his faults, he had endless imagination, an undeniable commitment to the cause and boundless energy, which often saw him working day and night in the office."

== After World War II ==
After the war, Buckmaster rejoined the Ford Motor Company, serving in Dagenham as director of public affairs. In 1946 and 1947, he wrote a series of eight articles on F Section for the now-defunct Chambers Magazine, entitled They Came By Parachute. He wrote two memoirs, Specially Employed (1952) and They Fought Alone (1958). He was interviewed for the 1969 documentary The Sorrow and the Pity. Buckmaster was an adviser on, and appeared as himself in, the film Odette, about Odette Sansom (then Odette Churchill, later Hallowes). Maurice Buckmaster Lane, built on the former School of Service Intelligence site in Ashford, Kent, is named after him.He was portrayed by Linus Roache in the 2019 film A Call to Spy.

== Awards ==
- Mention in Despatches awarded on 20 December 1940.
- Médaille de la Résistance France.
- Légion d'honneur France.
- Legion of Merit (Officer) U.S. awarded 23 May 1947.
- Order of the British Empire (Civil Division) (Officer) awarded 3 January 1945.)
- Croix de Guerre 1939–1945 France.

== Bibliography ==
- Patrick Howarth (1980). Undercover: The men and women of the SOE. Routledge. ISBN 0710005733.
- Michael Richard Daniell Foot, SOE in France. An account of the Work of the British Special Operations Executive in France, 1940–1944, London, Her Majesty's Stationery Office, 1966, 1968; Whitehall History Publishing, in association with Frank Cass, 2004. Official History of SOE in Europe..
- André Gillois, L'Histoire secrète des Français à Londres, Le Cercle du nouveau Livre, Librairie Jules Taillandier, 1973.
- Verity, Hugh (2013). We Landed by Moonlight. Crecy Publishing. ISBN 9780947554750.
- M. R. D. Foot (2006). SOE in France. Routledge. ISBN 0415408008.
