= M. R. D. Foot =

British historian (1919–2012)

M. R. D. Foot CBE TD
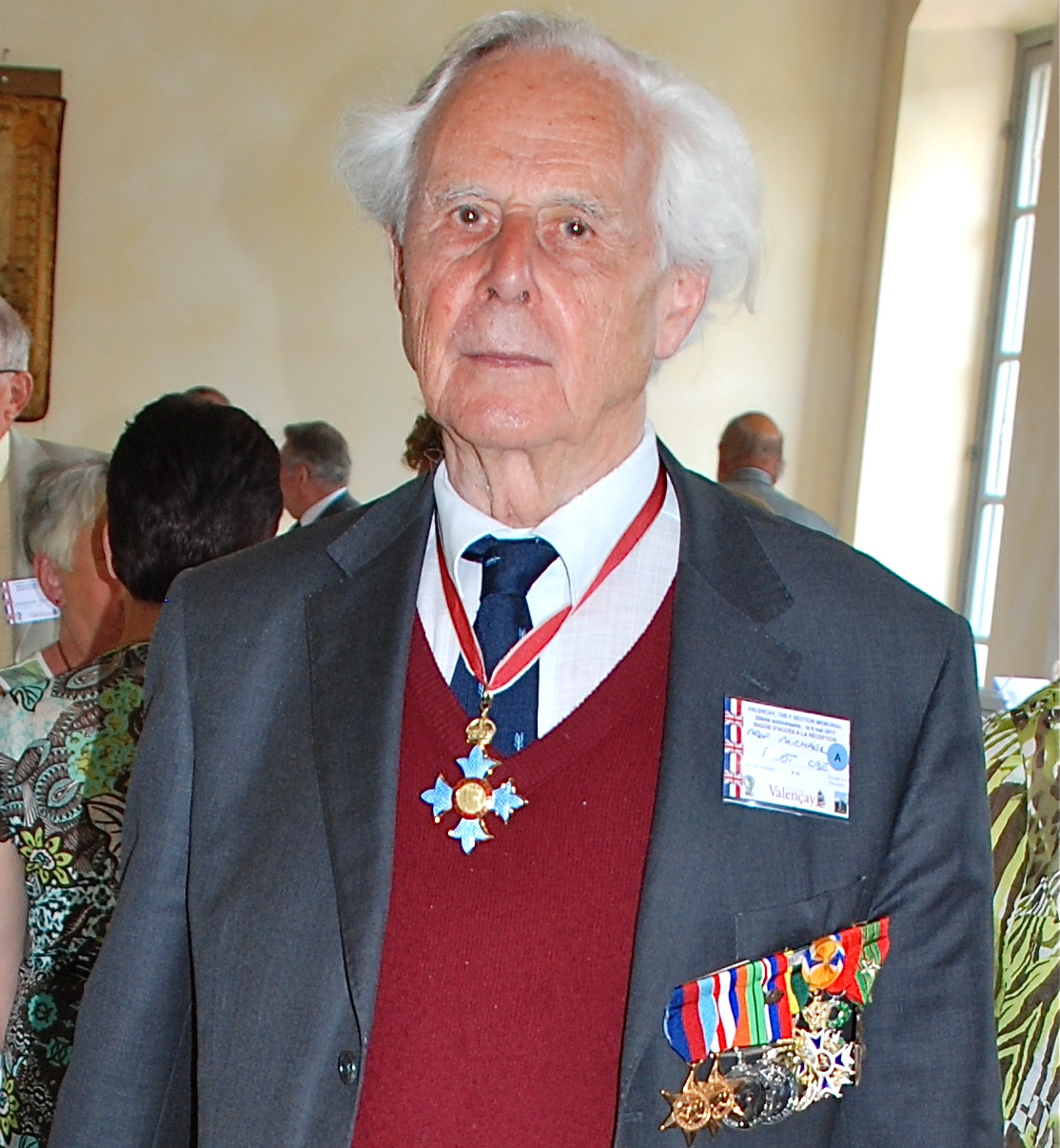
- Foot in 2011
- Born: Michael Richard Daniell Foot; 14 December 1919; London, England
- Died: 18 February 2012 (aged 92); Cambridge, Cambridgeshire, England
- Spouse(s): Philippa Foot (m. 1945; div. 1960) Elizabeth King (m. 1960, divorced) Mirjam Romme (m. 1972)
- Children: 2, including Sarah

Academic background
- Education: Winchester College; New College, Oxford

Academic work
- Discipline: Historian
- Sub-discipline: British history; military history; political history; Special Operations Executive
- Institutions: University of Oxford; Victoria University of Manchester

Michael Richard Daniell Foot (14 December 1919 – 18 February 2012) was a British political and military historian, and former British Army intelligence officer with the Special Operations Executive during the Second World War. Foot was the author of the official history about the Special Operations Executive, SOE in France.

== Biography ==
The son of a career soldier, Foot was educated at Winchester College and New College, Oxford, where he became involved romantically with Iris Murdoch.

Foot joined the British Army on the outbreak of the Second World War and was commissioned into a Royal Engineers searchlight battalion. In 1941 searchlight units transferred to the Royal Artillery. His service number was 85455. By 1942, he was serving at Combined Operations Headquarters, but wanting to see action he joined the SAS as an intelligence officer and was parachuted into France after D-Day. He was for a time a prisoner of war, and was severely injured during one of his attempts to escape. For his service with the French Resistance he was twice mentioned in despatches and awarded the Croix de Guerre. He ended the war as a major. After the war he remained in the Territorial Army, transferring to the Intelligence Corps in 1950.

After the war Foot taught at Oxford University for eight years before becoming Professor of Modern History at Manchester University in 1967. His experiences during the war gave him a lifelong interest in the European resistance movements, intelligence matters and the experiences of prisoners of war. This led him to become the official historian of SOE, with privileged access to its records, allowing him to write some of the first, and still definitive, accounts of its wartime work, especially in France. Even so, SOE in France took four years to get clearance.

== Personal life ==
Foot was very distantly related to his namesake Michael Foot. He was at one time married to the British philosopher Philippa Foot (née Bosanquet), the granddaughter of U.S. President Grover Cleveland. Foot's second wife was Elizabeth King, with whom he had a son and a daughter, the historian Sarah Foot. In 1972 Foot married Mirjam Romme, who under her married name became a distinguished historian of bookbinding. Foot has the distinction of being the only real person to be named in the spy novels of John LeCarre.

== Honours ==
Foot was appointed a Commander of the Order of the British Empire (CBE) in 2001. He also received the Territorial Decoration for Long Service in the Territorial Army.

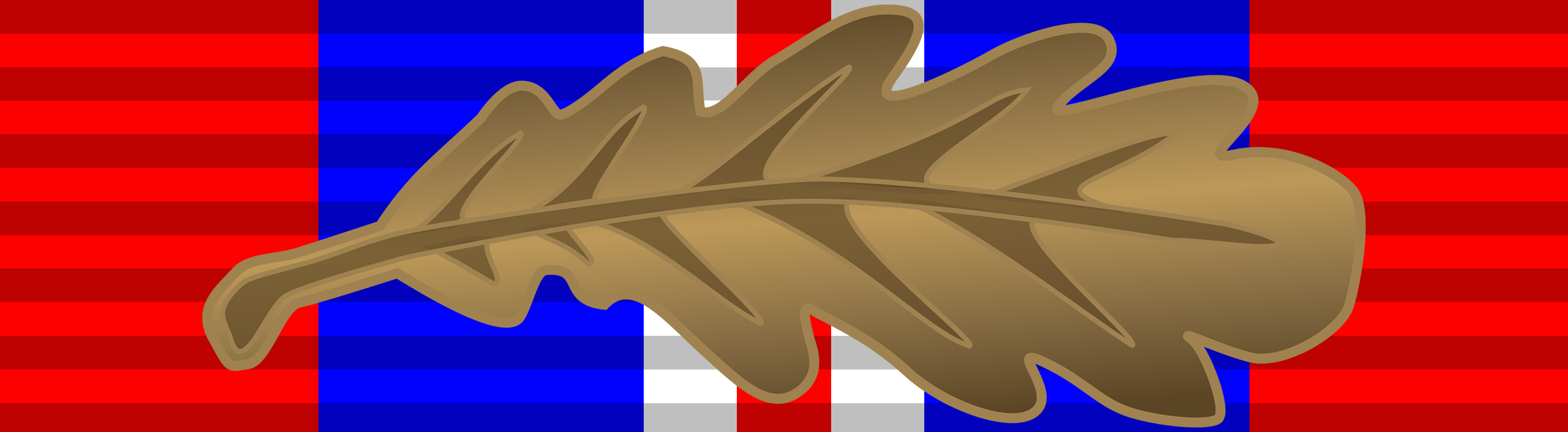

Ribbon	Description	Notes
	Order of the British Empire (CBE)	Commander, Civil Division, 2001
	1939–1945 Star	
	France and Germany Star	
	Defence Medal	
	War Medal 1939–1945	With Mentioned in dispatches Oakleaf
	Territorial Decoration (TD)	12 years service in the Territorial Army
	Order of Orange-Nassau	Officer, Awarded by the Kingdom of the Netherlands
	Legion of Honour	Knight, Awarded by France
	Croix de Guerre 1939–1945	With Silver Star, awarded by France

== Bibliography ==
=== Books ===
- Gladstone and Liberalism (1952) with J. L. Hammond
- British Foreign Policy since 1898 (1956)
- Men in Uniform: Military Manpower in Modern Industrial Societies (1961)
- SOE in France. An Account of the Work of the British Special Operations Executive in France 1940–1944 (1966)
- The Gladstone Diaries (from 1968) editor
- War and Society: Historical Essays in Honour and Memory of J. R. Western 1926–1971 (1973) editor
- Resistance – An Analysis of European Resistance to Nazism 1940–1945 (1977)
- Six Faces of Courage (1978)
- MI9: Escape and Evasion 1939–1945 (1979) with J. M. Langley
- Little Resistance: Teenage English Girl's Adventures in Occupied France (1982) with Antonia Hunt, née Lyon-Smith
- SOE: The Special Operations Executive 1940–1946 (1984)
- Art and War: Twentieth Century Warfare as Depicted By War Artists (1990)
- Open and Secret War, 1938-1945 (1991)
- Oxford Companion to World War II (1995) with I. C. B. Dear
- Foreign Fields: The Story of an SOE Operative (1997) by Peter Wilkinson - Foreword
- SOE in the Low Countries (2001)
- Secret Lives: Lifting the Lid on Worlds of Secret Intelligence (2002) editor
- The Next Moon: The Remarkable True Story of a British Agent Behind the Lines in Wartime France (2004) with Ewen Southby-Tailyour and André Hue
- Clandestine Sea Operations in the Mediterranean, North Africa and the Adriatic 1940–1944 (2004) with Richard Brooks ISBN 0-203-64164-7
- Memories of an SOE Historian (2008)

=== Articles ===
- "Great Britain and Luxemburg 1867" (English Historical Review, July 1952)

=== Book reviews ===
Year	Review article	Work(s) reviewed
2005	English Historical Review, V120 (2005): 1103–04	Thaddeus Holt (2004). The Deceivers. Weidenfeld & Nicolson. ISBN 0-297-84804-6.
2008	Foot, M. R. D. (4 October 2008). "Stage effects in earnest". The Spectator. 308 (9397): 44. Archived from the original on 4 December 2008.	Rankin, Nicholas (2008). Churchill's wizards. Faber and Faber.
