= Natzweiler-Struthof concentration camp =

Second World War Nazi internment camp

Natzweiler-Struthof
- Nazi concentration camp
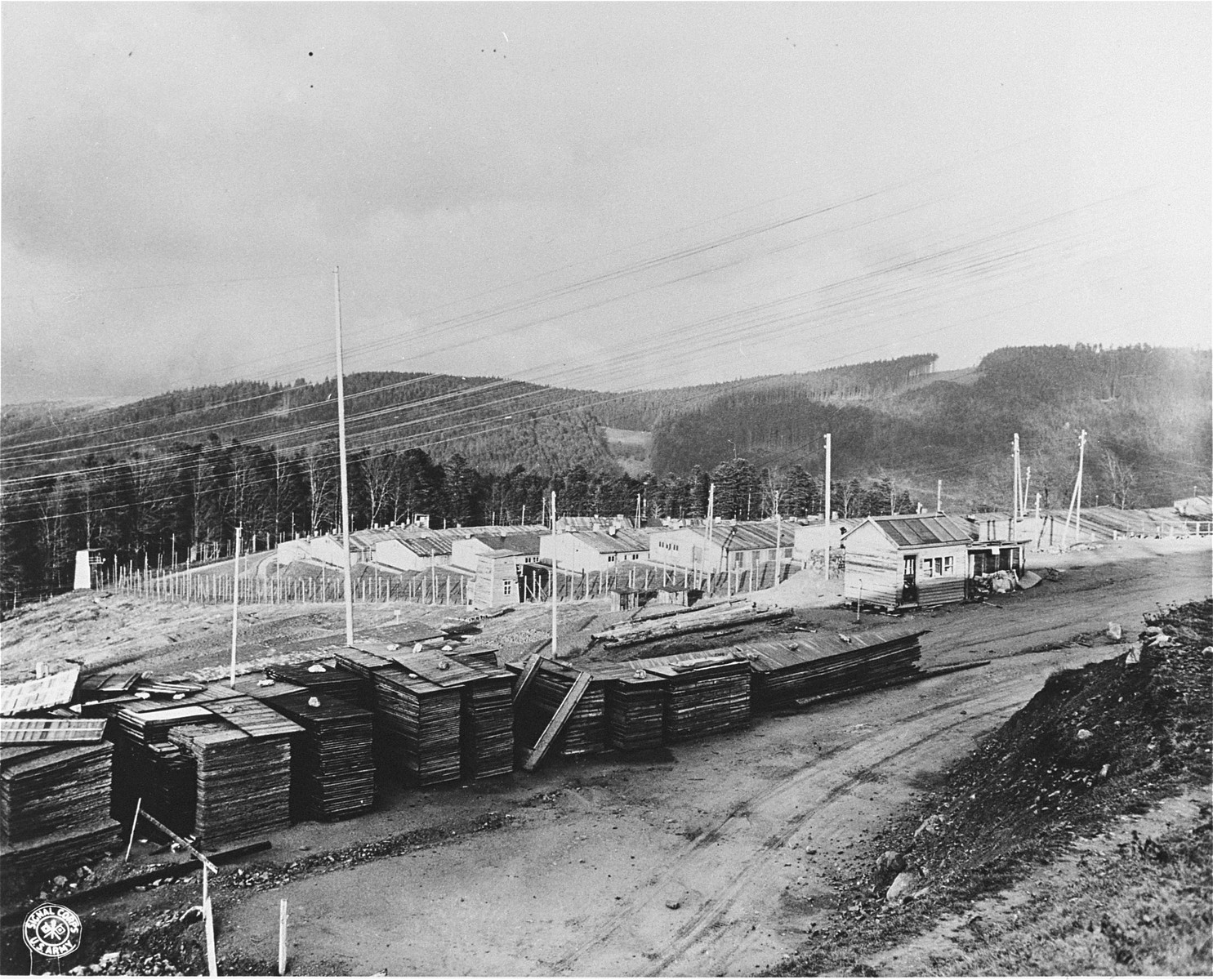
- Natzweiler-Struthof after liberation
- Coordinates: 48°27′17″N 7°15′16″E
- Known for: Nacht und Nebel resistance fighters, Jewish skull collection
- Location: Nazi Germany 1941–44 (de facto) (modern-day Bas-Rhin, France)
- Operated by: the Nazi Schutzstaffel (SS)
- Commandant: Hans Hüttig; Egon Zill; Josef Kramer; Fritz Hartjenstein; Heinrich Schwarz
- Operational: May 1941 – September 1944
- Number of gas chambers: one from April 1943
- Inmates: mainly resistance fighters from occupied European nations
- Number of inmates: 52,000 estimated
- Killed: 22,000 estimated
- Liberated by: French 1st Army, U.S. 6th Army Group, 23 November 1944
- Notable inmates: Boris Pahor, Trygve Bratteli, Charles Delestraint, Per Jacobsen, Asbjørn Halvorsen, Diana Rowden, Vera Leigh, Andrée Borrel, Sonya Olschanezky
- Notable books: Necropolis, The Names of the Numbers, The Nazi Hunters by Damien Lewis
- Website: www.struthof.fr/en/

Natzweiler-Struthof was a Nazi concentration camp located in the Vosges Mountains close to the villages of Natzweiler and Struthof in the Gau Baden-Alsace of Germany, on territory annexed from France on a de facto basis in 1940. It operated from 21 May 1941 to September 1944, and was the only concentration camp established by the Germans in the territory of pre-war France. The camp was located in a heavily forested and isolated area at an elevation of 800 metres (2,600 ft).

About 52,000 prisoners were estimated to be held there during its time of operation. The prisoners were mainly from the resistance movements in German-occupied territories. It was a labor camp, a transit camp and, as the war went on, a place of execution. Some died of exhaustion and starvation – there were an estimated 22,000 deaths at the camp and its network of subcamps. Many prisoners were moved to other camps; in particular, in 1944 the former head of Auschwitz concentration camp was brought in to evacuate the prisoners of Natzweiler-Struthof to Dachau as the Allied armies approached. Only a small staff of Nazi SS personnel remained when the camp was liberated by the French First Army under the command of the U.S. Sixth Army Group on 23 November 1944.

The anatomist August Hirt made a Jewish skull collection, whose purpose was to portray Jews as racially inferior, at the camp. In 2014, directors Emmanuel Heyd and Raphael Toledano released the documentary The Name of the 86 (French: Le Nom des 86). The film is about the 86 Jewish men and women murdered at the camp for Hirt's anatomical collection. Some of the people responsible for atrocities in this camp were brought to trial after the war ended.

The camp is preserved as a museum in memory of those held or killed there. The European Centre of Deported Resistance Members is located at this museum, focusing on those held. A monument to the departed stands at the site. The present museum was restored in 1980 after damage by neo-Nazis in 1976. Among notable prisoners, the writer Boris Pahor was interned in Natzweiler-Struthof and wrote his novel Necropolis based on his experience.

== Background ==
In 1940, Germany invaded and occupied France, including Alsace. That region, adjacent to the German border, was chosen for full Germanization and was annexed to Gau Baden-Alsace. On 2 July 1940, two weeks after the fall of the nearby city of Strasbourg, an internment camp was set up near Schirmeck which existed throughout the war but was never part of the concentration camp system. The Natzweiler-Struthof main camp on 1 May 1941 was established nearby at Natzweiler in the Bruche valley, due to its proximity to a quarry.

== Operations ==
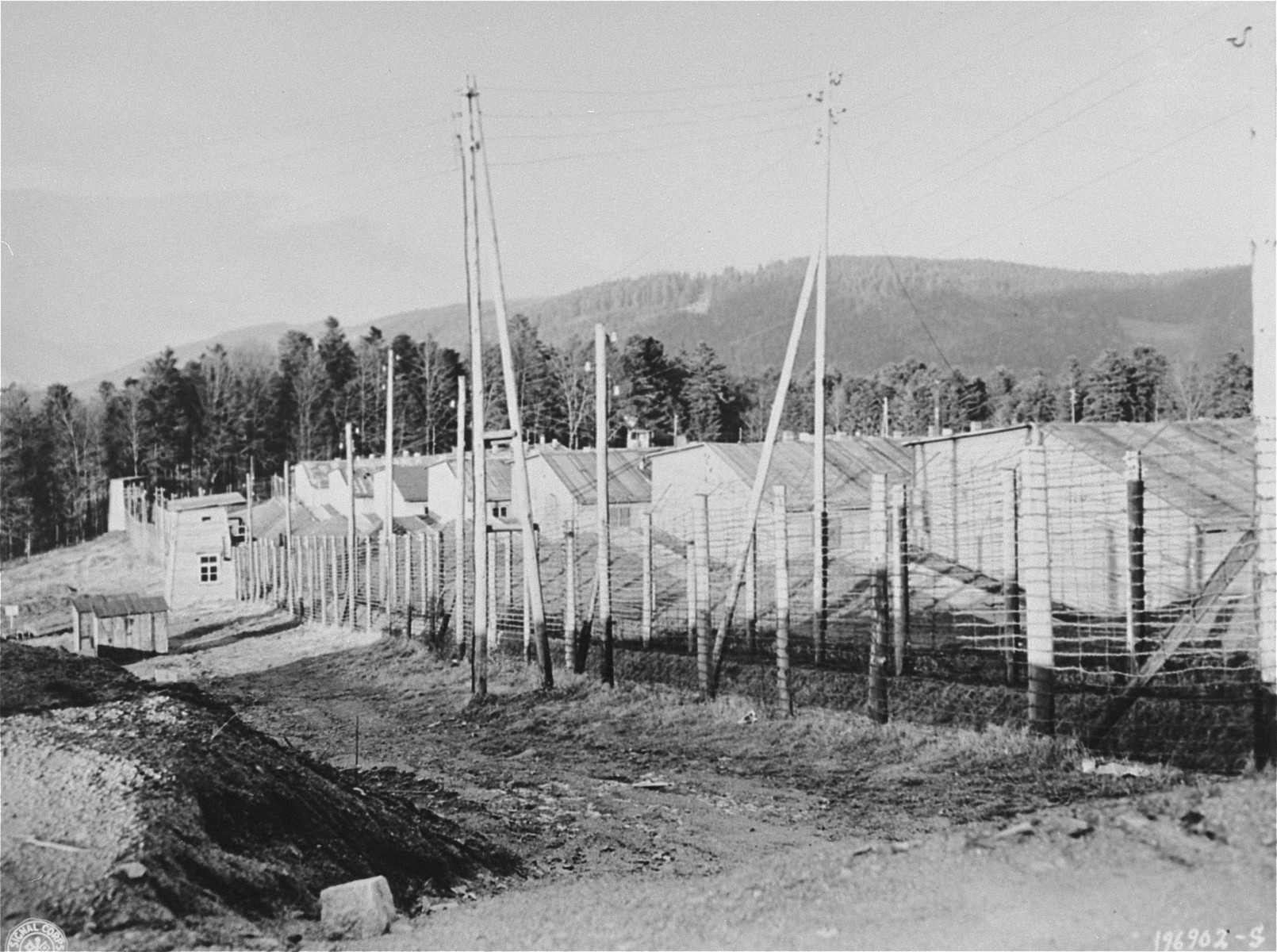
View of Natzweiler-Struthof concentration camp after liberation

The construction of Natzweiler-Struthof was overseen by Hans Hüttig in the spring of 1941, in a heavily forested and isolated area at an elevation of 800 metres (2,600 ft). The camp operated between 21 May 1941 and the beginning of September 1944, when the SS evacuated the surviving prisoners on a "death march" to Dachau, with only a small SS unit keeping the camp's operations.

On 23 November 1944, this camp with its small staff was discovered and liberated by the French First Army as part of the U.S. Sixth Army Group, on the same day that the city of Strasbourg was liberated by the Allies. Through 1945, Natzweiler-Struthof had a complex of about 70 subcamps or annex camps. (For the system of subcamps see List of subcamps of Natzweiler-Struthof.)

=== Initial focus and later actions ===
The total number of prisoners reached 52,000 over the three years, of 32 nationalities. Inmates originated from various countries, including Poland, the Soviet Union, the Netherlands, France, Nazi Germany, Slovene-speaking parts of Yugoslavia and Norway. The camp was specially set up for Nacht und Nebel prisoners, in most cases, people of the resistance movements. It was a labor camp and a transit camp, as many prisoners were sent to other Nazi concentration camps before the final evacuation. As the war continued, it became a death camp as well. Some people died of exhaustion from the work they had to do while starving. Deaths have been estimated at 22,000 at the main camp and the subcamps.

Interned prisoners provided forced labor for the Wehrmacht war industry, through contracts with private industry. The work was done mainly at the numerous annex camps, some of them located in mines or tunnels to protect them from Allied air raids. Work, hunger, darkness and lack of health care caused many epidemics; mortality rates could reach 80%. Some worked in quarries, but many worked in the arms industry at various subcamps. Daimler-Benz moved its aircraft engine factory from Berlin to a gypsum mine near the Neckarelz annex camp. The disused autobahn Engelberg Tunnel in Leonberg, near Stuttgart, was used by the Messerschmitt Aircraft Company which eventually employed 3,000 prisoners in forced labor. Another annex camp at Schörzingen was established in February 1944 to extract crude oil from oil shale. The total number of prisoners at all of the Natzweiler subcamps was an estimated 19,000 of whom between 7,000 and 8,000 were in the main camp at Natzweiler.

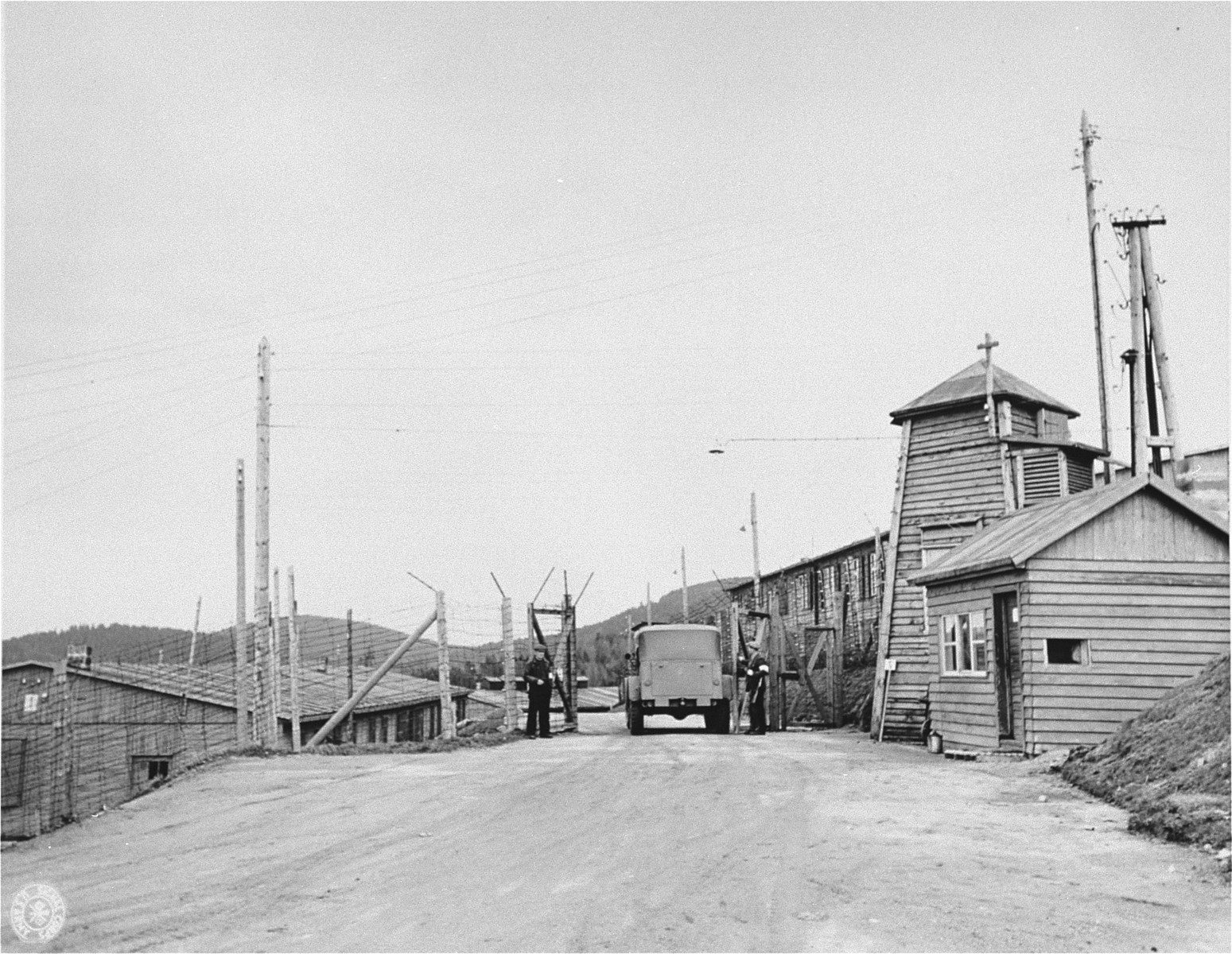
Gate of Natzweiler-Struthof concentration camp after liberation

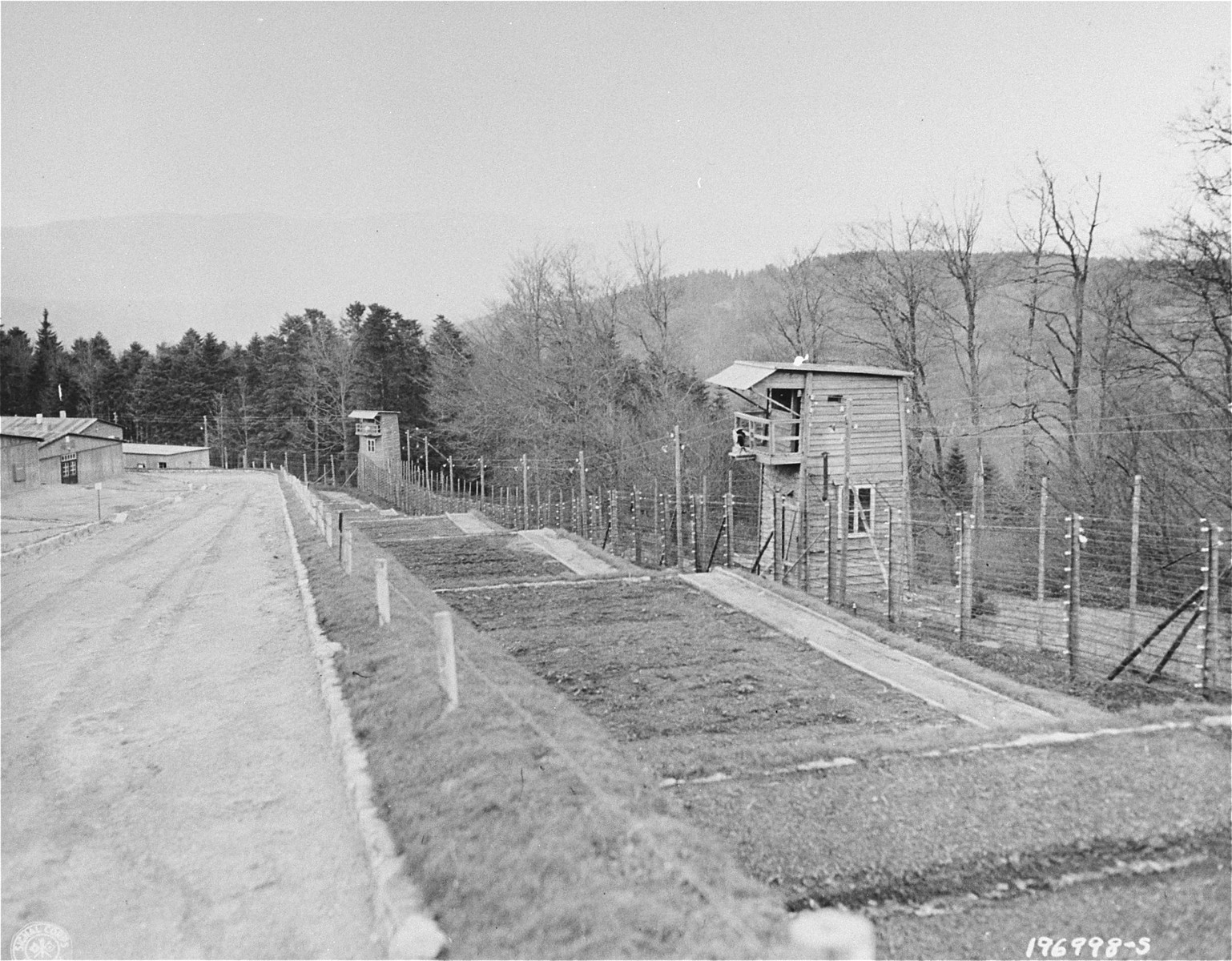
Border fence at Natzweiler-Struthof concentration camp

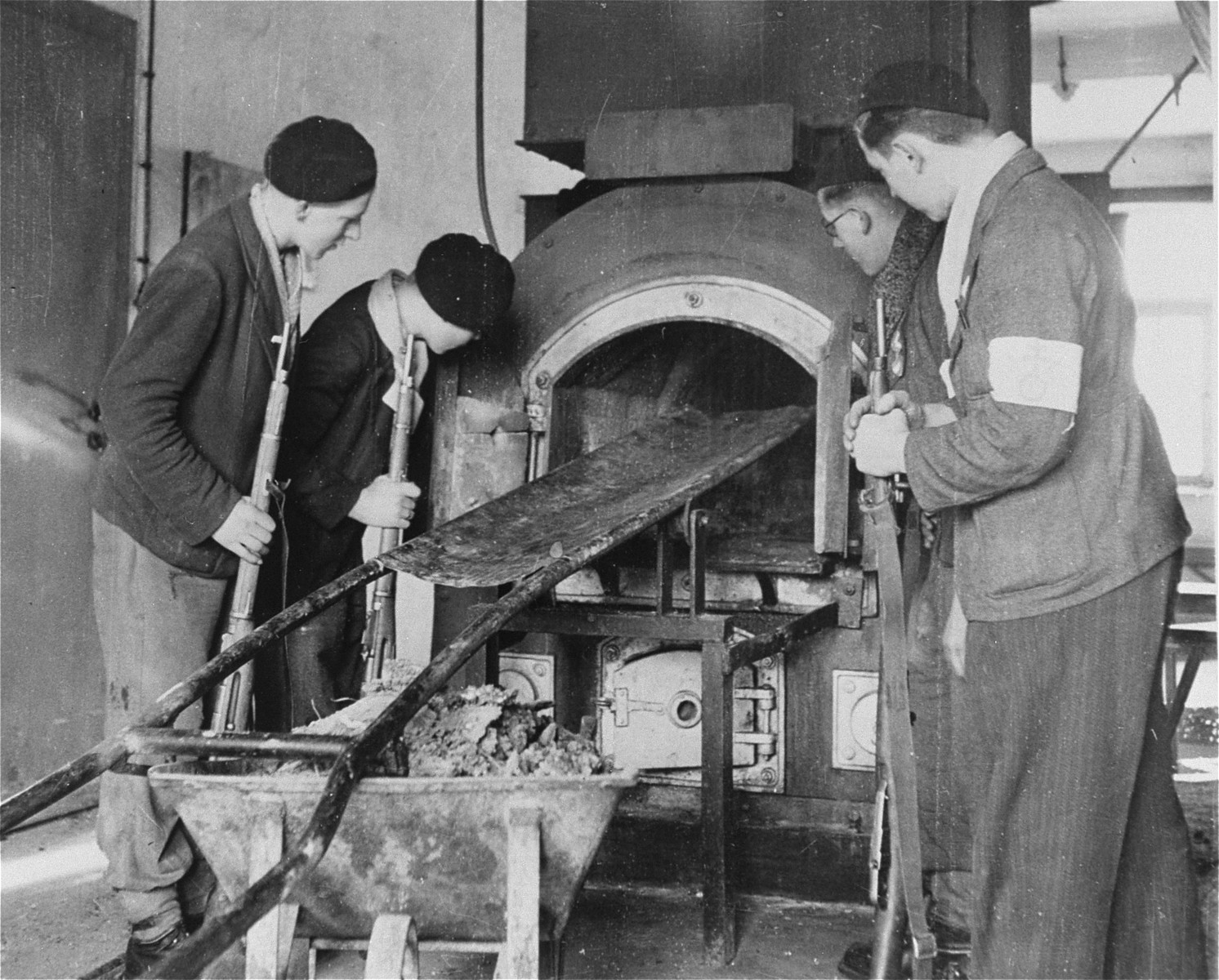
French resistance members inspect the crematorium after liberation

The camp held a crematorium and a jury rigged gas chamber outside the main camp, which was not used for mass extermination but for selective extermination, as part of the human experimentation programs, in particular on the problems of fighting a war, like typhus among the troops.

Doctors Otto Bickenbach and Helmut Rühl were accused of crimes committed at this camp. Hans Eisele was also stationed in this camp for a time. August Hirt committed suicide in June 1945; his suicide was unknown for many years, and he was tried in absentia in 1953 at Metz for his war crimes, including the Jewish skull collection, begun at Auschwitz, continued at Natzweiler-Struthof, and at the Reichsuniversität Straßburg.

Some prisoners were executed directly, by hanging, by gunshot or by gas. The female prisoner-population in the camp was small, and only seven SS women served in Natzweiler-Struthof camp (compared to more than 600 SS men) and 15 in the Natzweiler complex of subcamps. The main duty of the female supervisors in Natzweiler was to guard the few women who came to the camp for medical experiments or to be executed. The camp also trained several female guards who went to the Geisenheim and Geislingen subcamps in western Germany.

Leo Alexander, the medical advisor at the Nuremberg trials, stated that some children were murdered at Natzweiler-Struthof for the sole purpose of testing poisons for inconspicuous executions of Nazi officials and prisoners. Such executions of took place at Bullenhuser Damm.

The camp became a war zone in late summer 1944, and was evacuated in early September 1944. Prior to the evacuation of the camp, 141 prisoners were shot dead on 31 August – 1 September 1944. The 70th anniversary of this execution of those who resisted Nazi occupation was commemorated at the museum in 2014.

=== Notable prisoners ===
Four female British SOE agents were executed together on 6 July 1944: Diana Rowden, Vera Leigh, Andrée Borrel and Sonya Olschanezky. Brian Stonehouse of the British SOE and Albert Guérisse, a Belgian escape line leader, witnessed the arrival of the four women and the events leading up to their execution and cremation; both men testified to the executions of the four women in post-war trials. The two men were sent to Dachau, where they were liberated. Roger Boulanger writes of the four British SOE women executed under the supervision of Dr. Plaza and Dr. Rhode, in his section on Capital Punishment (Les exécutions capitales), as to the intent of the RSHA of Berlin, Reichssicherheitshauptamt, to have them disappear with no trace, as their names were not recorded as being at this camp. Stonehouse later sketched the four women which aided in their identification.

Charles Delestraint, leader of the Armée Secrète, was detained at Natzweiler-Struthof, then was executed by the Gestapo in Dachau days before that camp was liberated and the war ended. Henri Gayot, a member of the French Resistance who was interned at Struthof between April and September 1944, documented his ordeal in drawings which are now in the Struthof Concentration Camp Museum.

Bishop Gabriel Piguet, the Roman Catholic Bishop of Clermont-Ferrand, was interned at Natzweiler before being transferred to the Priest Barracks of Dachau Concentration Camp. He is honored as a Righteous Among the Nations by Yad Vashem, Israel's Holocaust Memorial, for hiding Jewish children in Catholic boarding schools.

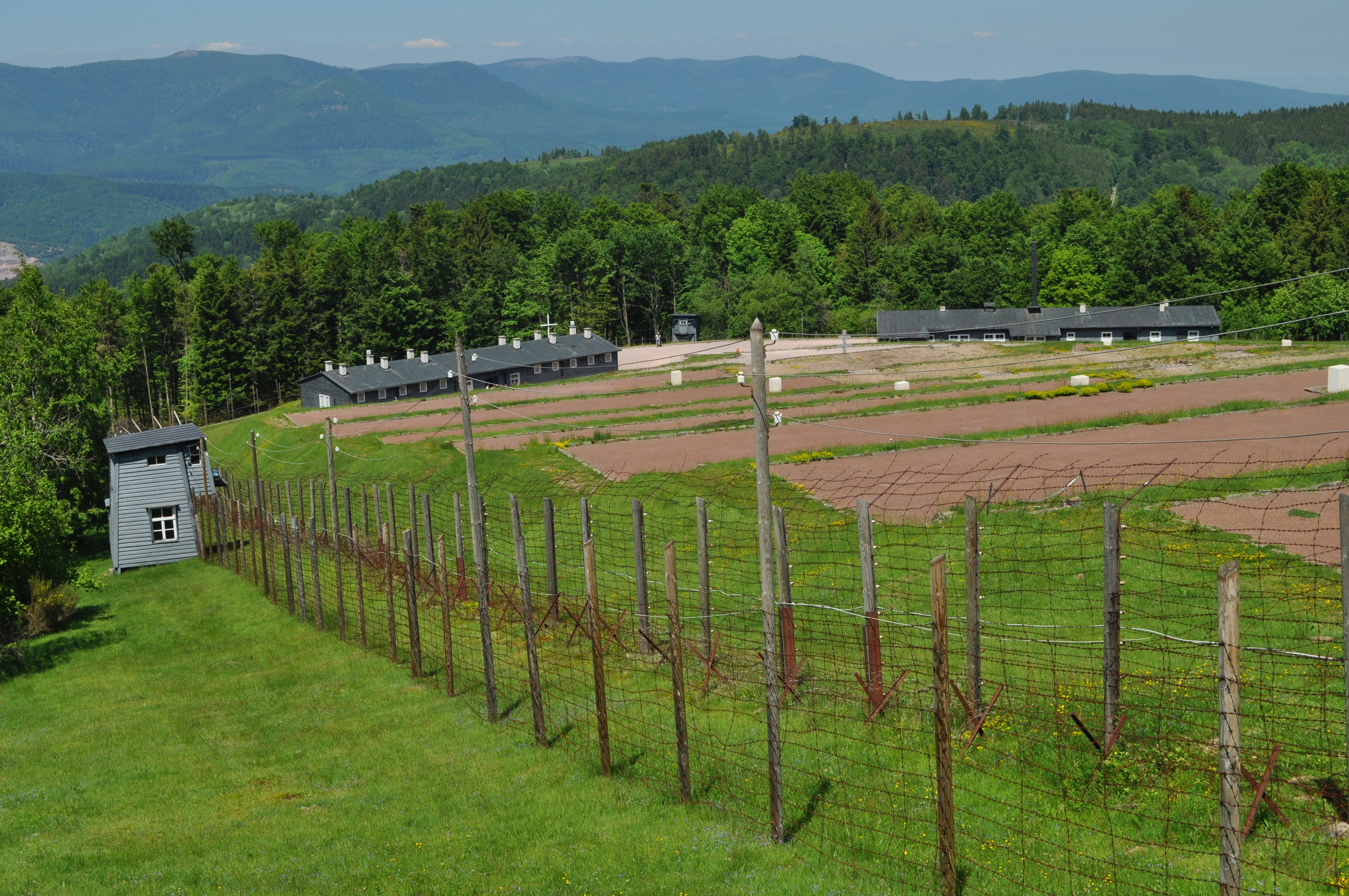
Present-day appearance: the crematorium was in the building on the right, while the flat, bare spaces are where the barracks were located.

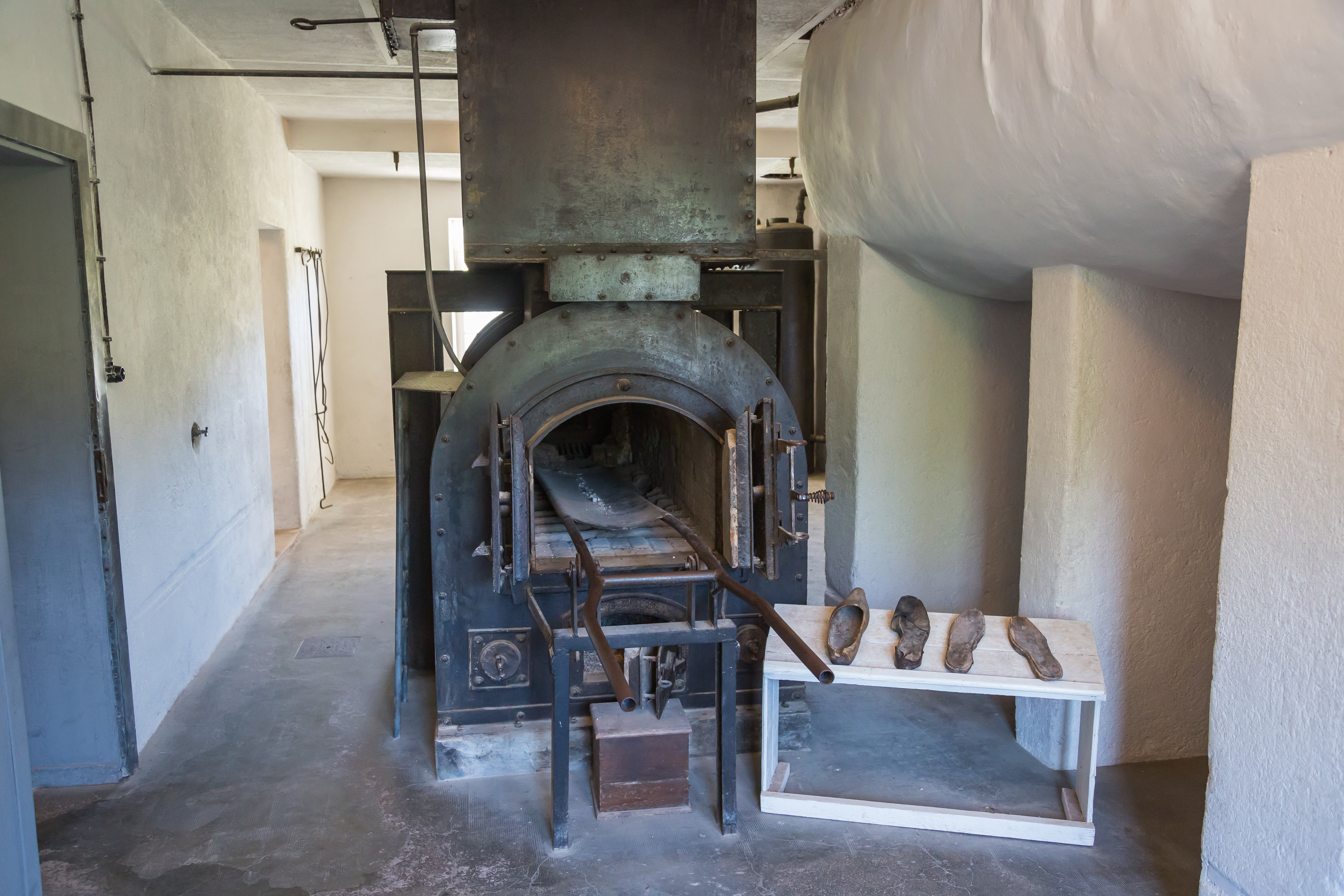
The crematorium at Natzweiler-Struthof as it looks today

Two British Royal Air Force airmen (Flying Officer Dennis H. Cochran, and Flight Lieutenant Anthony "Tony" R. H. Hayter) who were involved in "The Great Escape" and murdered by the Gestapo after re-capture, were cremated at Natzweiler-Struthof.

British bomber Sergeant Frederic ("Freddie") Habgood was hanged at this camp, after his Lancaster bomber crashed in Alsace on 27 July 1944 and he was betrayed to the Nazis by a local woman. Two died as a result of the crash, three survived as prisoners of war in a camp in Poland, one returned to England with the help of the resistance, and Mr Habgood was hanged on 31 July 1944. His death was acknowledged as a war crime in 1947 and his family was informed, but the most personal evidence of his presence there, a silver bracelet with his name on it, emerged from the soil in July 2018, as an area with flowers was being watered by a volunteer.

In his memoirs titled Moi, Pierre Seel, déporté homosexuel, Pierre Seel, who served a sentence at the neighboring camp of Schirmeck, tells that he took part in the construction of the Struthof concentration camp, in the context of his forced labor tasks.

Notable Norwegian prisoners at Natzweiler include newspaper editor and Labour Party politician Trygve Bratteli who later went on to become Prime Minister of Norway, and former footballer Asbjørn Halvorsen who had previously played in Germany for Hamburger SV. Both were imprisoned at Natzweiler for distribution of illegal newspapers in German-occupied Norway. In total, 504 Norwegians were imprisoned at Natzweiler. Only 266 of them returned home alive.

The Slovene novelist Boris Pahor was imprisoned at the camp in 1944. Pahor was later transported to Dachau camp and other camps until finally liberated in Bergen-Belsen. After the war he wrote the novel Necropolis about his experiences in the camp. The novel was later translated into numerous other European languages.

== List of personnel ==
The camp had five commandants and numerous doctors in its history.

=== Commanders (Commandants) ===
- SS-Hauptsturmführer Hans Huttig
- SS-Sturmbannführer Egon Zill
- SS-Hauptsturmführer Josef Kramer
- SS-Sturmbannführer Fritz Hartjenstein
- SS-Hauptsturmführer Heinrich Schwarz

=== SS Doctors ===
- SS-Hauptsturmführer Kurt aus dem Bruch
- SS-Hauptsturmführer Karl Babor
- SS-Hauptsturmführer Heinz Baumköther
- SS-Hauptsturmführer Max Blancke
- SS-Obersturmführer Franz von Bodmann
- SS-Obersturmführer Hans Eisele
- SS-Obersturmführer Herbert Graefe
- SS-Sturmbannführer Richard Krieger
- SS-Obersturmführer Georg Meyer
- SS-Hauptsturmführer Heinrich Plaza
- SS-Hauptsturmführer Elimar Precht
- SS-Untersturmführer Andreas Rett
- SS-Untersturmführer Werner Rohde
- SS-Hauptsturmführer Gerhard Schiedlausky
- SS-Obersturmführer Siegfried Schwela

== Private firms using inmate labor ==
The following private firms used Natzweiler-Struthof camp's inmates for labor in their factories:

- Allgemeine Elektrizitäts Gesellschaft (AEG)
- Adlerwerke AG (formerly Adlerwerke vorm. Heinrich Kleyer)
- Bayerische Motorenwerke AG (BMW)
- Berger
- Bergwerks Industrie AG
- Daimler-Benz AG
- Friedrich Krupp Ironworks
- Gruen & Bulfinger
- Henkel & Cie
- Heinkel Flugzeugwerke, aircraft factory, Zuffenhausen
- Kessler Factory
- Koch & Mayer
- Messerschmitt AG
- Röchling Group

== Jewish skull collection ==
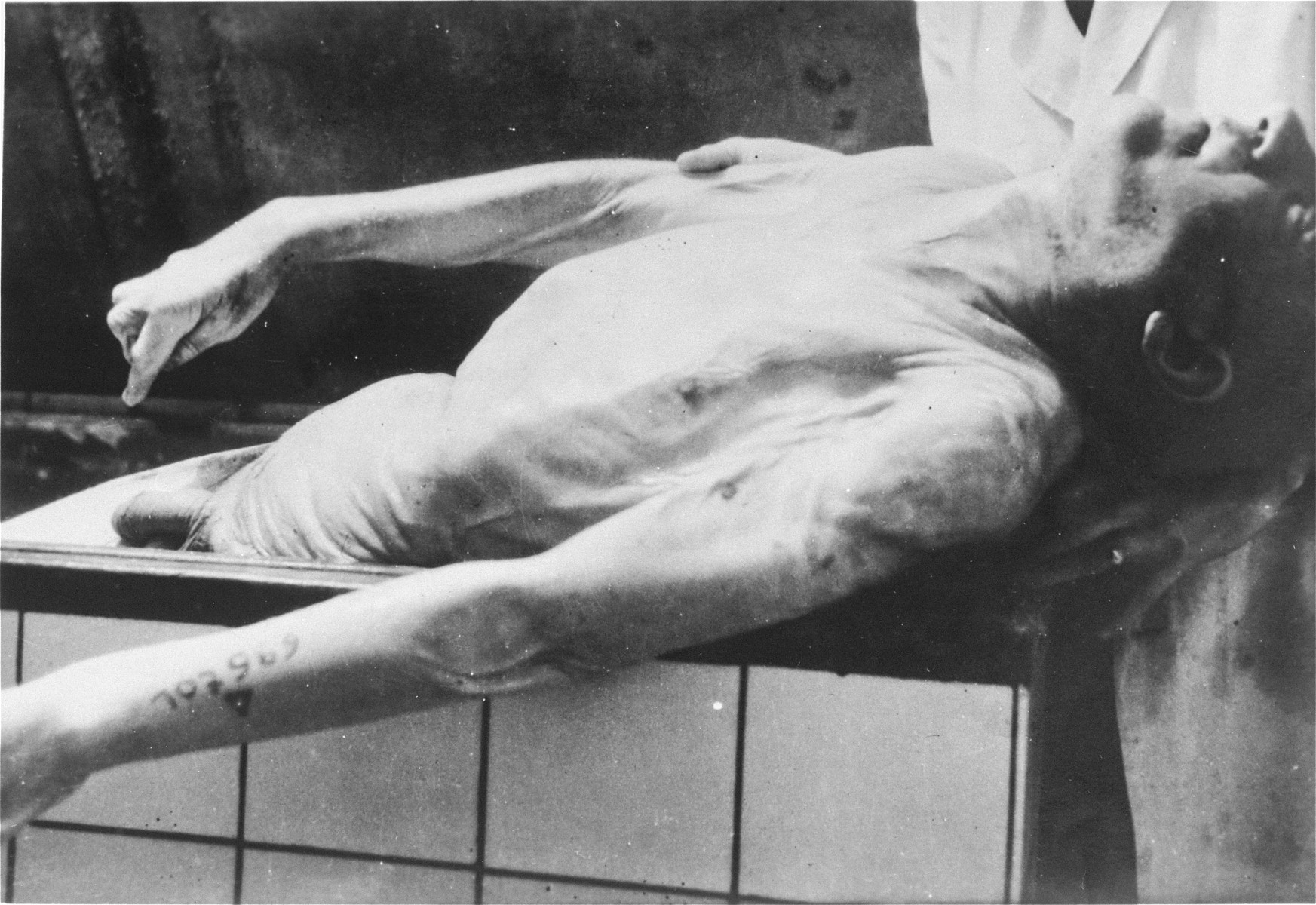
Menachem Taffel's body, part of the Jewish skull collection

The Jewish skull collection was an attempt by the Nazis to create an anthropological display to showcase the alleged racial inferiority of the "Jewish race" and to emphasize the status of Jews as Untermenschen ("sub-humans"), in contrast to the Germanic Übermenschen ("super-humans") Aryan race which the Nazis considered to be the "Herrenvolk" (master race). The people who were to serve as best examples of the "Jewish race" were selected from people at the Auschwitz camp, then brought to Natzweiler-Struthof both to eat well and then to be murdered by gas, and their corpses brought to the Anatomy Institute of at the Reich University of Strasbourg (Reichsuniversität Straßburg) in the annexed region of Alsace, a project of great scope. Some initial study of the corpses was performed, but the progress of the war stalled completion of the collection.

The collection was sanctioned by Reichsführer of the SS Heinrich Himmler, and under the direction of August Hirt with Rudolf Brandt and Wolfram Sievers who was responsible for procuring and preparing the corpses as part of his management of the Ahnenerbe (the National Socialist scientific institute that researched the archaeological and cultural history of the hypothesized Aryan race). In a 2013 documentary by Sonia Rolley and others, two historians remark that "Hirt is one of the most absolutely criminal of National Socialist ideology," adds the historian Yves Ternon. "The project itself, continues Professor Johann Chapoutot, is an example of this investment of politics by science, or science by politics that is Nazism."

In 1943, the inmates selected at Auschwitz were transported to Natzweiler-Struthof. They spent two weeks eating well in barracks there in Block 13, so they would be good specimens of normal size. The deaths of 86 inmates were, in the words of Hirt, "induced" at a jury rigged gassing facility at Natzweiler-Struthof on several days in August and their corpses, 57 men and 29 women, were sent to Strasbourg for study. Natzweiler-Struthof was considered the better place for gassing the selected victims (better than at Auschwitz), as they would die one by one, with no damage to the corpses, and Natzweiler-Struthof was at Hirt's disposal. Josef Kramer, acting commandant of Natzweiler-Struthof (who was a Lagerführer at Auschwitz and the last commandant of Bergen Belsen) personally carried out the gassing of 80 of the 86 victims at Natzweiler-Struthof.

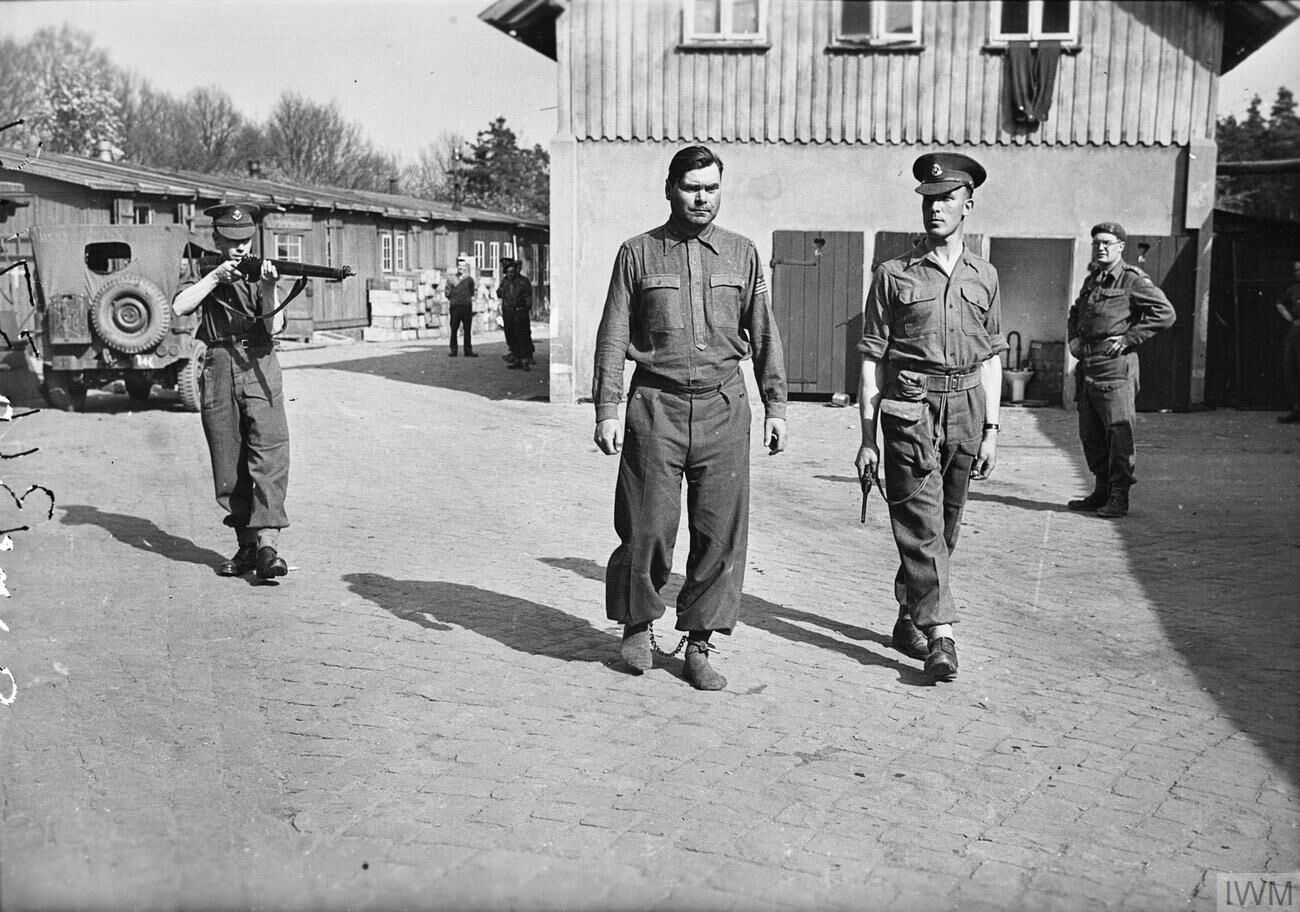
Josef Kramer, former commandant of Natzweiler-Struthof, in leg irons at Belsen before being removed to the POW cage at Celle, 17 April 1945

The next part of the process for this "collection" was to bring the corpses to the Reichs University, where Hirt's plan was to make anatomical casts of the bodies. Photos of the corpses as found by the Allies who saw them in the Reichs University make the totality of the strange project quite real. The next step after making the casts was to have been reducing them to skeletons. Neither of those steps, making the casts nor reducing the corpses to skeletons, was carried out. In 1944, with the approach of the Allies, there was concern over the possibility that the corpses could be discovered. In September 1944, Sievers telegrammed Brandt: "The collection can be defleshed and rendered unrecognizable. This, however, would mean that the whole work had been done for nothing – at least in part – and that this singular collection would be lost to science, since it would be impossible to make plaster casts afterwards." And so it was left, as the camp was evacuated in September 1944, and the human remains were left at a room in the Reichs University of Strasbourg.

Two anthropologists, who were both members of the SS, Hans Fleischhacker and Bruno Beger, along with Wolf-Dietrich Wolff, were accused of making selections at Auschwitz of Jewish prisoners for Hirt's collection of 'racial types', the man who devised the project of the Jewish skull collection. Beger was found guilty, although he was credited for pre-trial imprisonment and served no time. Also named as associated with this project are doctor Karl Wimmer and the anatomist Anton Kiesselbach. August Hirt, who conceived the project, was sentenced to death in absentia at the Military War Crimes Trial at Metz on 23 December 1953. It was unknown at the time that Hirt had shot himself in the head on 2 June 1945 while in hiding in the Black Forest.

For many years only a single victim, Menachem Taffel (prisoner no. 107969), a Polish-born Jew who had been living in Berlin, was positively identified through the efforts of Serge and Beate Klarsfeld. In 2003, Hans-Joachim Lang, a German professor at the University of Tübingen succeeded in identifying all the victims, by comparing a list of inmate numbers of the 86 corpses at the Reichs University in Strasbourg, surreptitiously recorded by Hirt's French assistant Henri Henrypierre, with a list of numbers of inmates vaccinated at Auschwitz. The names and biographical information of the victims were published in the book Die Namen der Nummern (The Names of the Numbers). Rachel Gordon and Joachim Zepelin translated the introduction to the book to English, at the web site where the whole book, including the biographies of the 86 people, is posted in German. Lang recounts in detail the story of how he determined the identities of the 86 victims gassed for Hirt's project of the Jewish skull collection. Forty-six of these individuals were originally from Thessaloniki, Greece. The 86 were from eight countries in German-occupied Europe: Austria, Netherlands, France, Germany, Greece, Norway, Belgium and Poland. The biographies of all 86 people are described in English on a web site set up by Lang.

In 1951, the remains of the 86 victims were reinterred in one location in the Cronenbourg-Strasbourg Jewish Cemetery. On 11 December 2005, memorial stones engraved with the names of the 86 victims were placed at the cemetery. One is at the site of the mass grave, the other along the wall of the cemetery. Another plaque honoring the victims was placed outside the Anatomy Institute at Strasbourg's University Hospital.

In 2022, the gas chamber was reopened to the public, but the European Center for Deported Resistance Fighters (CERD), led by Guillaume d'Andlau, indicated that it did not want to: "celebrate the inauguration of this morbid place", having " nothing to do with those intended for mass murder", specifying that "it is a symbolic place for the camp and its activities in connection with the Reichsuniversität Straßburg" which is perceived as a lack of sensitivity towards mourners.

== Post-war criminal trials ==
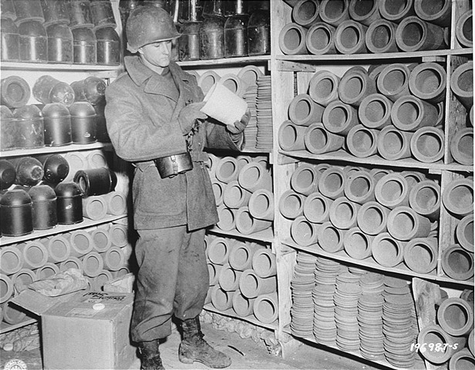
An American soldier in Natzweiler-Struthof examines an urn used to hold the ashes of cremated prisoners.

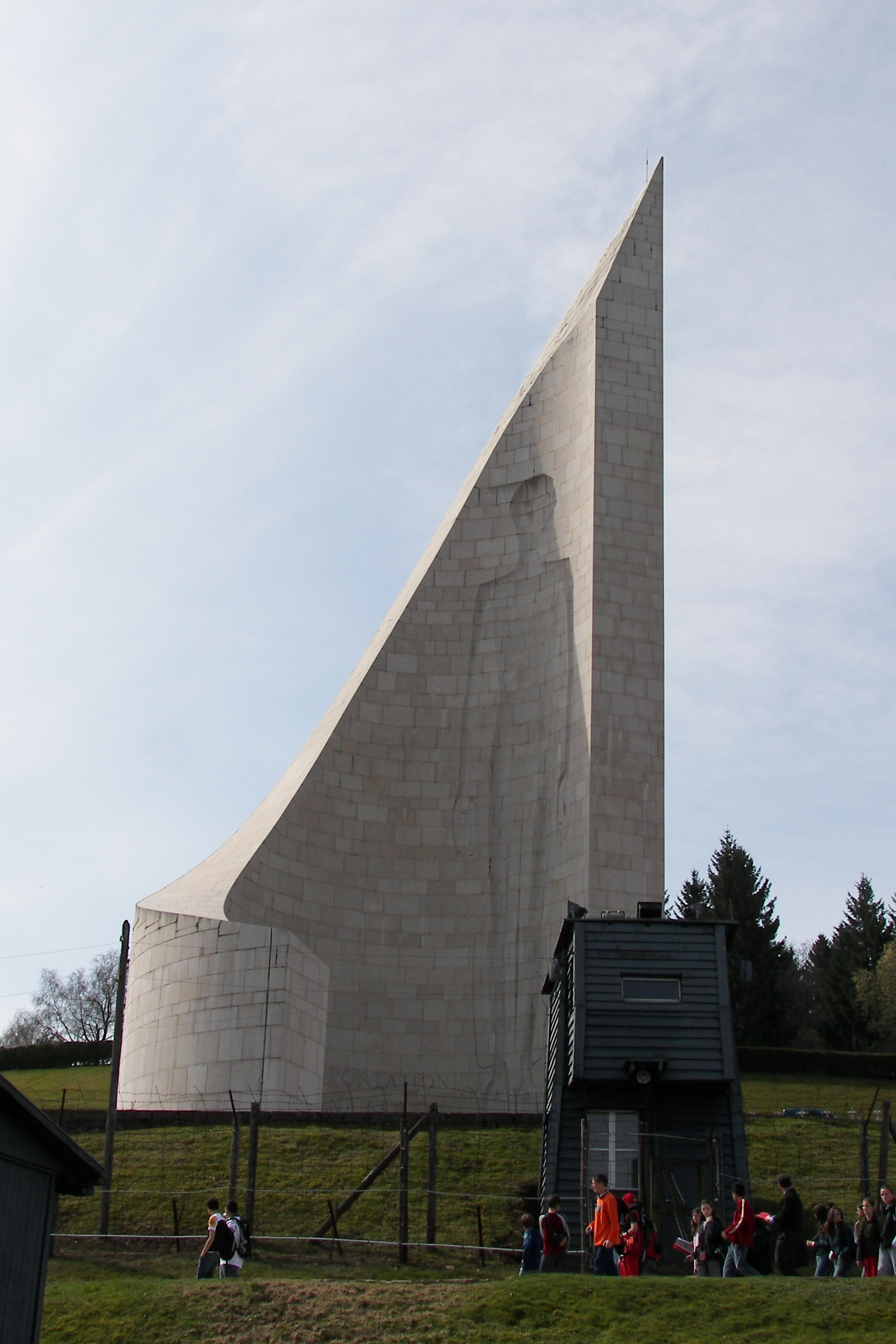
The Monument to the Departed at Natzweiler-Struthof

The first camp commandant, Hans Hüttig, was sentenced to life in prison on 2 July 1954 by a French military court in Metz. In 1956, he was released from detention after being imprisoned for eleven years.

Josef Kramer, the former commandant of the camp during the time of the Jewish skull collection project, was arrested at Bergen-Belsen concentration camp on 17 April 1945 and tried at Lüneburg in the British-occupied sector for other crimes committed in Auschwitz and Bergen-Belsen. He was sentenced on 16–17 November 1945 and was hanged at Hamelin prison on 13 December 1945.

The commandant of Natzweiler at the time that four female resistance agents were executed, Fritz Hartjenstein and five others were tried by a British war crimes court at Wuppertal, from 9 April to 5 May 1946. All of the accused were found guilty; of these, three were sentenced to death and two hanged. Hartjenstein's death sentence was commuted to life imprisonment on 1 June 1946. However, he was tried a second time by the British for hanging a POW who was a member of the Royal Air Force. He died of a heart attack while awaiting execution on 20 October 1954.

Those tried at Wuppertal were:

1. Franz Berg: death sentence (executed by hanging 11 October 1946)
2. Kurt Geigling: 10 years imprisonment
3. Josef Muth: 15 years imprisonment
4. Peter Straub: death sentence (executed by hanging 11 October 1946)
5. Magnus Wochner: 10 years imprisonment
6. Fritz Hartjenstein (commandant): death sentence, commuted to life (Wuppertal), death sentence by British (Rastatt), death sentence by French Court (Metz), died before sentence was carried out

Magnus Wochner was also implicated in the Stalag Luft III murders and was listed among the accused. Heinrich Ganninger, adjutant and deputy of commander Fritz Hartjenstein, committed suicide in Wuppertal prison in April 1946 before his trial. He was accused of having murdered four British female spies.

Heinrich Schwarz was tried separately at Rastatt in connection with atrocities committed during his tenure as commandant of Natzweiler-Struthof. He was sentenced to death and subsequently shot by a firing squad near Baden-Baden on 20 March 1947.

== Post-war history, museum and monument ==
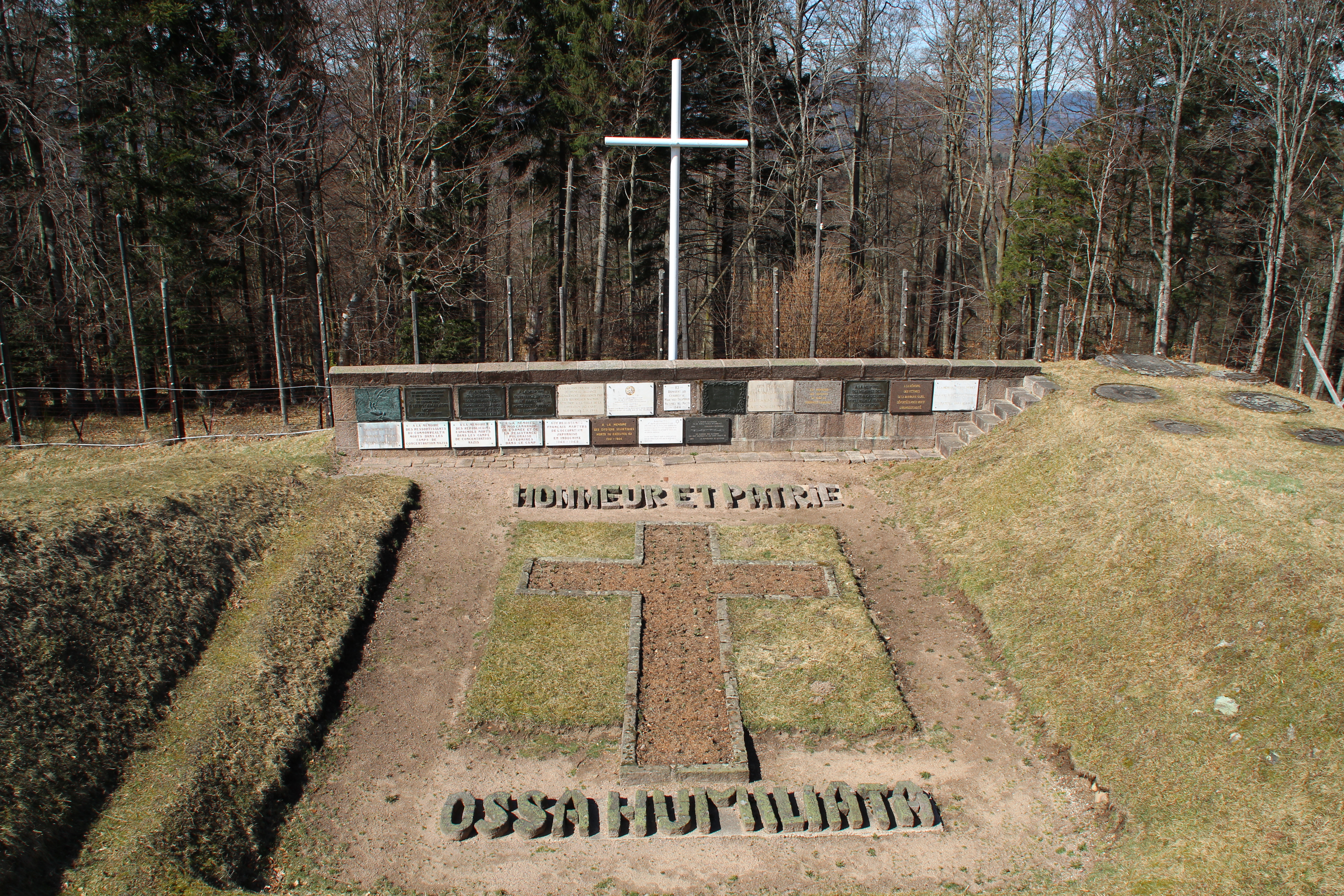
In memory; Honneur et Patrie (Honor and country) / Ossa Humiliata from Psalm 50-51 (bones which have been humbled)

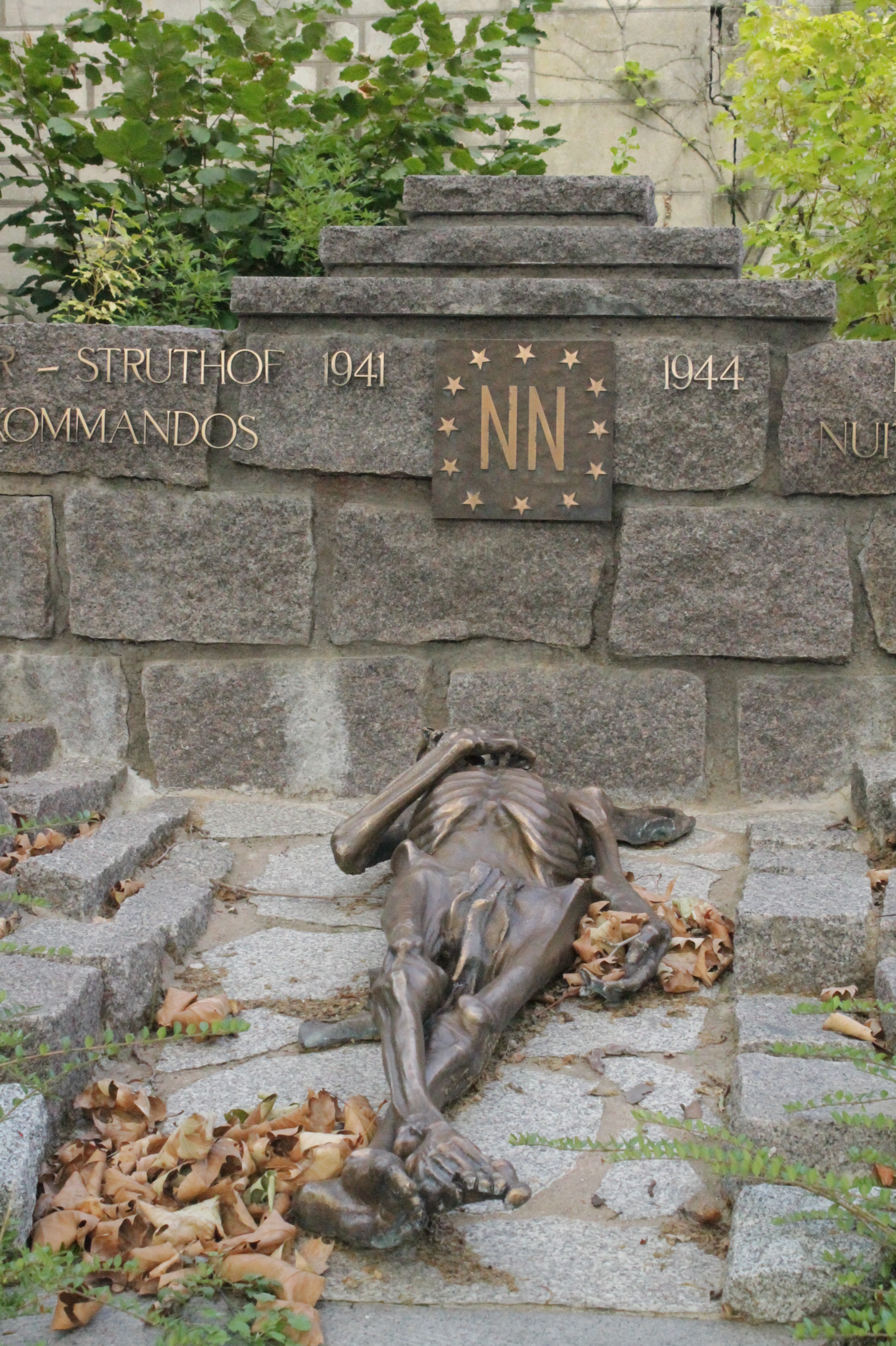
Memorial to the Struthof Concentration Camp and its experiments, Pere Lachaise Cemetery, Paris

During the night of 12–13 May 1976, neo-Nazis burned the camp museum, with the loss of important artifacts. Structures were rebuilt, placing the artifacts that survived the fire as they were found originally. The reconstructed camp museum was officially opened on 29 June 1980. The European Centre of Deported Resistance Members, a new structure at the site, opened in November 2005, and at the same time, "the museum was entirely redesigned to focus solely on the history of Natzweiler concentration camp and its subcamps."

A monument (including a bronze figure supine and emaciated) stands in Pere Lachaise Cemetery in Paris.

Roger Boulanger, the camp's last survivor, died on 19 November 2026, at the age of 100.

== Documentary films ==
A documentary film was shown in 2014 about the 86 people who were murdered in the camp and whose remains were later identified by name, as described above in The Jewish skull collection section. The film "The names of the 86" (French: Le nom des 86) was directed by Emmanuel Heyd and Raphael Toledano (Dora Films).

Another documentary was made about the skull project in 2013, titled Au nom de la race et de la science, Strasbourg 1941–1944 (English: In the name of Race and Science, Strasbourg 1941–1945). Its goal was to explain what happened at Reich University of Strasbourg, at Natzweiler-Struthof, in the strange use of science in this Nazi project to eliminate the Jews, but keeping some remains for history and science, the project never fully completed.

In the 2019 BBC One documentary The Man Who Saw Too Much Alan Yentob traces the story of 106-year-old Boris Pahor, believed to be the oldest known survivor of the Nazi concentration camps at the time.

== See also ==
- List of subcamps of Natzweiler-Struthof
- List of Nazi concentration camps
- Hans-Joachim Lang
