= Bickenbach =

Bickenbach may refer to:

- Bickenbach, Hesse, a municipality in Hesse, Germany
- Bickenbach, Rhineland-Palatinate, a municipality Rhineland-Palatinate, Germany
- Bickenbach, a part of Engelskirchen in North Rhine-Westphalia, Germany
- Otto Bickenbach (1901–1971), German physicist
- Richard Bickenbach (1907–1994), American animator
