= Necropolis (Pahor novel) =

1967 autobiographical novel by Boris Pahor

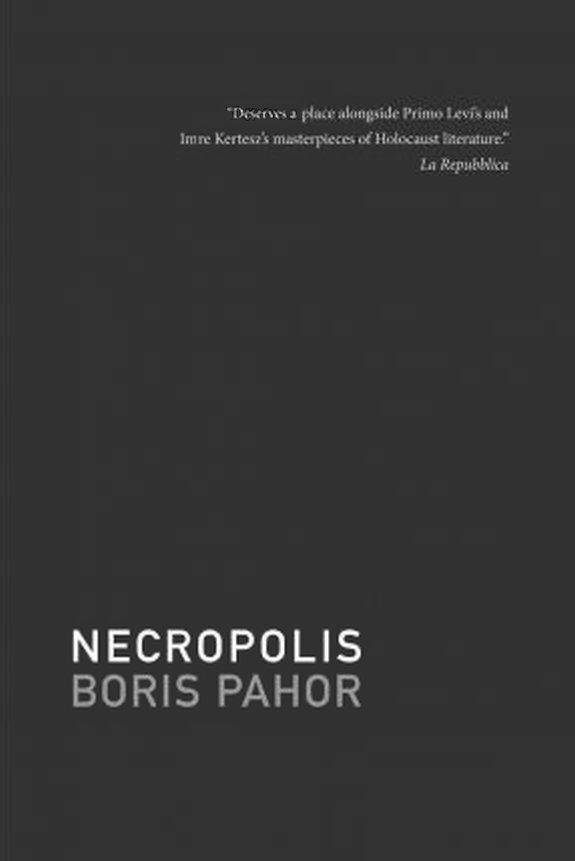
- Author: Boris Pahor
- Original title: Nekropola
- Language: As of 2013, it has been translated twice into English. It has also been translated into French, German, Catalan, Finnish, Italian, Serbian, Spanish, Dutch, Croatian, Portuguese, and Esperanto; original in Slovene.
- Genre: autobiography, Holocaust
- Published: 1967
- Publisher: Dalkey Archive Press
- English publication date: 1995
- ISBN: 9781564786111

Necropolis (Slovene: Nekropola) is an autobiographical novel by Boris Pahor about his Holocaust experience. It has been compared to works by Primo Levi, Imre Kertész, and Jorge Semprún.

== Plot summary ==
The story is told from the point of view of a Nazi concentration camp survivor who is visiting the Natzweiler-Struthof camp, twenty years after he was sent from there back to Dachau, Mittelbau-Dora, Harzungen, and finally Bergen-Belsen, which was liberated on 15 April 1945.

== International recognition ==
The Slovene philosopher Evgen Bavčar, living in France—Pahor's friend, whose mother worked in Trieste, as Pahor's mother did—predicted that as a Slovene writer Pahor would be recognized by Italy only after he was recognized by France and Germany. As explained in a 2010 documentary (Note: The 2010 documentary Trmasti spomin (The Stubborn Memory) from 32 m 35 s onward.) and in an interview with Pahor that was published in 2013 by Bukla Magazine, Italian publishers were not interested in publishing Pahor until French and German translations were published. Only after France and Germany recognized Pahor did his work finally begin to be published in Italy in 2007.

== Publication history ==
The work has been published in several languages in the decades since its first publication in 1967. The novel has been translated twice into English, first under the title Pilgrim Among the Shadows in 1995, and the second time under the title Necropolis in 2010. It has also been translated into French: Pèlerin parmi les ombres (1996), German: Nekropolis (2001, 2003), Catalan: Necròpolis (2004), Finnish: Nekropoli (2006), Italian: Necropoli (2008), Serbian: Necropola (2009), Spanish: Necrópolis (2010), Dutch: Nekropolis (2011), Croatian: Nekropola (2012), Portuguese: Necrópole (2013), Swedish: Nekropol (2013), and Esperanto: Pilgrimanto inter ombroj.

== Adaptation ==
In 2010, the novel was adapted for theater.

== See also ==
- The Holocaust in art and literature
- Slovenian literature
