= Boris Pahor =

Slovenian writer (1913–2022)

Boris Pahor OMRI
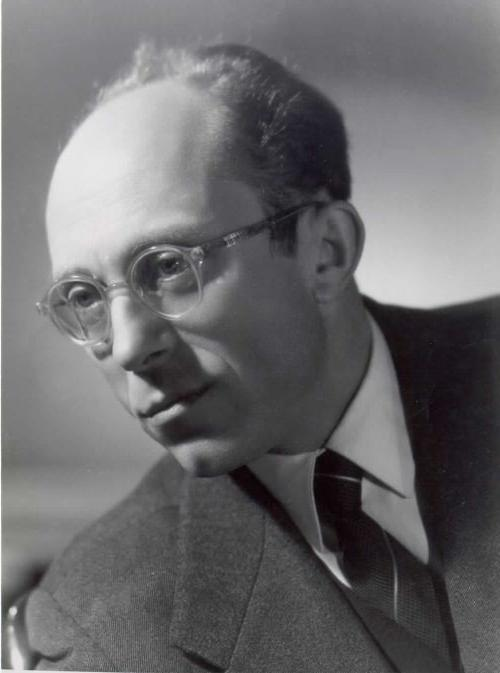
- Pahor in 1958
- Born: 26 August 1913; Imperial Free City of Trieste, Cisleithania, Austria-Hungary (present-day Trieste, Italy)
- Died: 30 May 2022 (aged 108); Trieste, Italy
- Resting place: Trieste Cemetery
- Education: University of Padua
- Occupation: Writer
- Spouse: Radoslava Premrl (1921–2009)
- Writing career
- Language: Slovene; Italian; French
- Notable work: Necropolis

Boris Pahor (Slovene pronunciation: [ˈbóːɾis ˈpàːxɔɾ]), OMRI (26 August 1913 – 30 May 2022) was a Slovene novelist from Trieste, Italy, who was best known for his heartfelt descriptions of life as a member of the Slovenian minority in pre–Second World War increasingly fascist Italy as well as a Nazi concentration camp survivor. In his novel Necropolis he visits the Natzweiler-Struthof camp twenty years after his relocation to Dachau. Following Dachau, he was relocated three more times: to Mittelbau-Dora, to Harzungen, and finally to Bergen-Belsen, which was liberated on 15 April 1945.

His success was not immediate; openly expressing his disapproval of communism in Yugoslavia, he was not acknowledged and was probably intentionally not recognized by his homeland until after Slovenia had gained its independence in 1991. His autobiographical novel Nekropola, published in 1967, was first translated into English (in 1995) as Pilgrim Among the Shadows, and secondly (in 2010) as Necropolis. The novel has also been translated into several other languages.

Pahor was a prominent public figure in the Slovene minority in Italy, who were affected by Fascist Italianization. Although a member of the Slovene Partisans, he opposed Marxist communism. He was awarded the Legion of Honour by the French government and the Cross of Honour for Science and Art by the Austrian government, and was nominated for the Nobel prize for literature by the Slovenian Academy of Sciences and Arts. He refused the title of honorary citizen of the capital of Slovenia because he believed that the Slovene minority in Italy (1920–47) was not supported the way it ought to have been during the period of Fascist Italianization by right-wing or left-wing Slovenian political elites. Pahor was married to the author Radoslava Premrl (1921–2009) and wrote a book dedicated to her at the age of 99. In addition to Slovene and Italian, he was fluent in French. Following the death of Marko Feingold on 19 September 2019, he became the oldest living survivor of the Holocaust.

== Early life under Italian Fascism ==
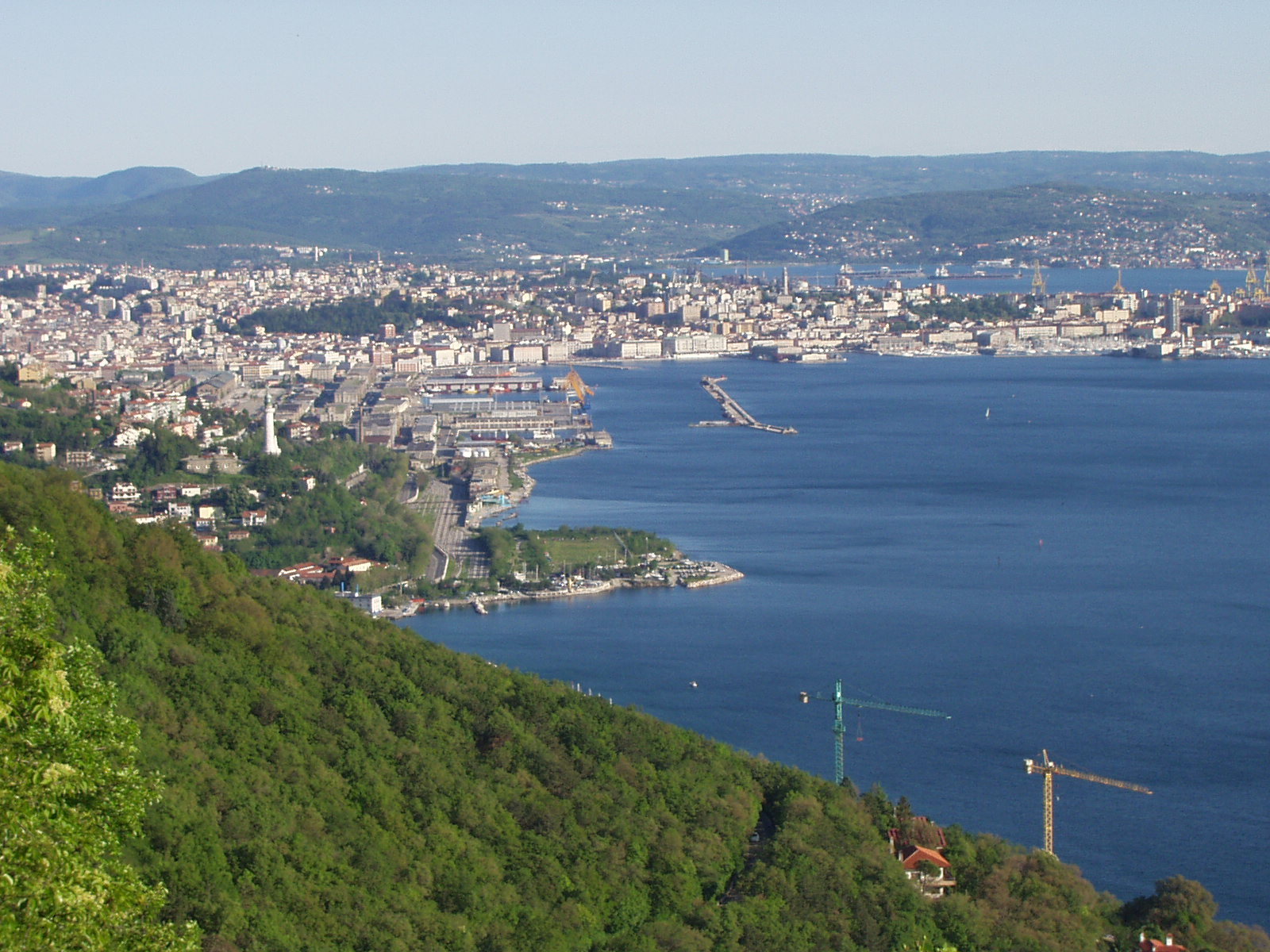
View of Trieste, "The City in the Bay" from Pahor's novels

Pahor was born on 26 August 1913 into a Slovene minority community in Trieste, the main port of the Austro-Hungarian Empire and the capital of the Austrian Littoral region at the time. Pahor's father Franc was born in Kostanjevica na Krasu, a settlement that was severely ravaged by the Battles of the Isonzo during the First World War. Franc married Marija Ambrožič and found a job in Trieste as a civil servant in the Austro-Hungarian administration.

Under the Treaty of Rapallo, the Kingdom of Italy annexed territories which included a substantial ethnic Slovene population, and that included a quarter of Slovene ethnic territory and approximately 330,000 out of total population of 1.3 million Slovenes. After the annexation, and even more after Benito Mussolini came to power in 1922, the forced Fascist Italianization of the Slovene minority began.

In 1920, Italian Black shirts in Trieste burned down the Slovene Community Hall (Slovene: Narodni dom), which the young Pahor witnessed. All non-Italian languages (including Slovene and German) were forbidden as languages of instruction by the Fascist regime three years after this event. Between 1926 and 1932, all Slovene, Croatian, and German toponyms as well as first and last names began to be subjected to Italianization—during which also his future wife's name (Radoslava) was changed to Francesca. Fascism had a traumatizing effect on young Pahor, which he remembered in an interview for Delo two months before his 100th birthday:

... due to the trauma of experience of the Slovene Community Hall being burned down, which I experienced at age seven, on the spot, and following the shock that I could not go to Slovene schools anymore, I felt robbed in a way of the spiritual and psychological meaning of life. (Note: (In Slovene:"... ob travmi, ki je nastala ob požigu Narodnega doma, ki sem ga doživel sedemleten neposredno na kraju samem, in potem šoku zaradi odvzema šolanja v slovenskem jeziku sem bil nekako duhovno-psihološko oropan smisla svojega obstoja."))

Pahor later wrote about this childhood memory in one of his later novels, Trg Oberdan (Oberdan Square), named after the square on which the Slovene Community Hall stood, and also in essays.

He enrolled in an Italian-language Catholic seminary in Koper, and graduated in 1935. He then went to Gorizia to study theology, leaving in 1938. The 1936 Fascist attack on Slovene choirmaster Lojze Bratuž—who was kidnapped, tortured, and killed on Christmas Eve because his choirs continued singing in Slovene—was later referred to by Pahor as confirming his dedication to anti-Fascism and the Slovene ethnic cause, as well as a lifelong intellectual opposition to all totalitarianisms in the name of Christian humanist and communitarian values. Pahor considered himself a pantheist. Although no public and private use of Slovene was allowed and the relations between Slovenes living in Fascist Italy and those from the Kingdom of Yugoslavia were forcibly cut off, Pahor nevertheless managed to publish his first short stories in several magazines in Ljubljana (then part of the Kingdom of Yugoslavia) under the pseudonym Jožko Ambrožič, after he began to study standard Slovene during his stay in Capodistria and Gorizia.

In 1939, he established contact with the Slovenian personalist poet and thinker Edvard Kocbek. Kocbek introduced him to contemporary literary trends and helped him improve his use of standard Slovene. In 1938, he returned to Trieste, where he established close contacts with the few Slovene intellectuals who were still working underground in Trieste, including poet Stanko Vuk and some members of the Slovene militant anti-fascist organization TIGR.

== Surviving Nazism and concentration camps ==
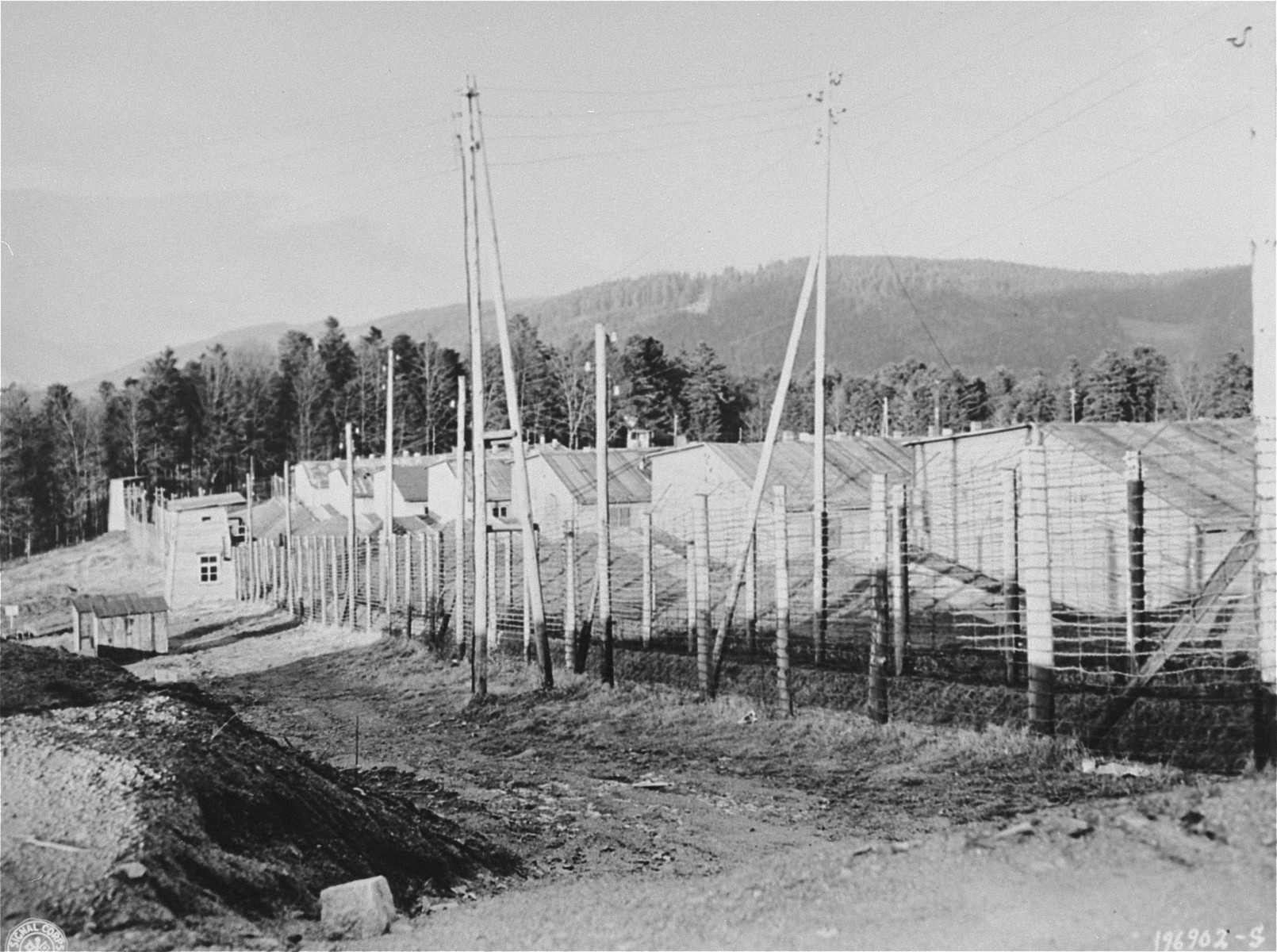
View of Natzweiler-Struthof concentration camp after liberation

In 1940, Pahor was drafted into the Italian army and sent to fight in Libya. In 1941, he was transferred to Lombardy, where he worked as a military translator. At the same time, he enrolled at the University of Padua, where he studied Italian literature. After the Italian armistice in September 1943, he returned to Trieste, which had already fallen under Nazi occupation. After a few weeks in the German-occupied city, he decided to join the Slovene Partisans active in the Slovenian Littoral. In 1955, he described these crucial weeks of his life in the novel Mesto v zalivu (The City on the Bay), a story about a young Slovene intellectual from Trieste, wondering about what action to take confronted with the highly complex personal and political context of World War II on the border between Italy and Slovenia.

The Littoral Home Guard—a local Slovene anti-communist and anti-Partisan military organization in Slovene Littoral that was directly subordinated to Odilo Globocnik—handed 600 persons suspected of involvement with or sympathy to the resistance over to the Nazis, among them Boris Pahor. The Nazi administration first transported him to Dachau, from which he was relocated to Sainte-Marie-aux-Mines (Markirch) and Natzweiler-Struthof in Alsace. From there he was sent back to Dachau, Mittelbau-Dora, Harzungen, and finally to Bergen-Belsen, which was liberated on 15 April 1945. The concentration camp experience became the major inspiration for Pahor's work, which has been frequently compared to that of Primo Levi, Imre Kertész, or Jorge Semprún. Between April 1945 and December 1946, Pahor recovered at a French sanatorium in Villers-sur-Marne, Île-de-France.

== Opposing communism ==
Pahor returned to Trieste at the end of 1946 when the area was under Allied military administration. In 1947, he graduated from the University of Padua with a bachelor's thesis on the poetry of Edvard Kocbek. The same year, he met Kocbek for the first time. The two men were united in their criticism of the communist regime in Yugoslavia and established a close friendship that lasted until Kocbek's death in 1981.

In 1951 and 1952, Pahor defended Kocbek's literary work against the organized attacks launched by the Slovenian communist establishment and its allies in the Free Territory of Trieste. This resulted in a break with the local leftist circles, with which Pahor had been engaged since 1946. He grew closer to Liberal Democratic positions and in 1966, together with fellow writer from Trieste Alojz Rebula, he founded the journal Zaliv (The Bay), in which he sought to defend "traditional democratic pluralism" against the totalitarian cultural policies of communist Yugoslavia.

The journal Zaliv was published in Slovene in Trieste in Italy outside of reach of communist Yugoslavian authorities. This enabled Zaliv to become an important platform for democratic discussion, in which many dissidents from communist Slovenia could publish their opinions. Pahor discontinued the journal in 1990, after the victory of the Democratic Opposition of Slovenia in the first free elections in Slovenia after World War II.

Between 1953 and 1975, Pahor worked as an Italian literature instructor in a Slovene-language high school in Trieste. During this time, he was an active member of the international organization AIDLCM (Association internationale des langues et cultures minoritaires), which aims to promote minority languages and cultures. In this function, he travelled around Europe discovering the cultural plurality of the continent. This experience strengthened his communitarian and anti-centralist views.

In 1969, Pahor was one of the co-founders of the political party Slovene Left (Slovenska levica), established to represent all Slovene leftist voters in Italy who did not agree with the strategy adopted by the Slovene Titoist groups after 1962 of participating in the mainstream Italian political parties (mostly the Communist Party of Italy and the Socialist Party of Italy). The party eventually merged with the Slovene Union. Pahor publicly supported the Slovene Union on several occasions, and ran on its tickets for general and local elections.

In 1975, Pahor and Alojz Rebula published a book in Trieste, entitled Edvard Kocbek: pričevalec našega časa (Edvard Kocbek: Witness to Our Time) and the 1975 Zaliv Scandal followed. Pahor, who lived in Italy and was an Italian citizen, was banned from entering Yugoslavia for several years. He was able to enter Yugoslavia only in 1981 when he was allowed to attend Kocbek's funeral. In 1989, his book Ta ocean strašnó odprt (This Ocean, So Terribly Open) published in Slovenia by the Slovene Society (Slovenska matica) publishing house, was dedicated to Pahor's memories of Kocbek and marked one of the first steps towards the final rehabilitation of Kocbek's public image in post-communist Slovenia.

== Later years and recognition ==
=== Recognition in Slovenia ===
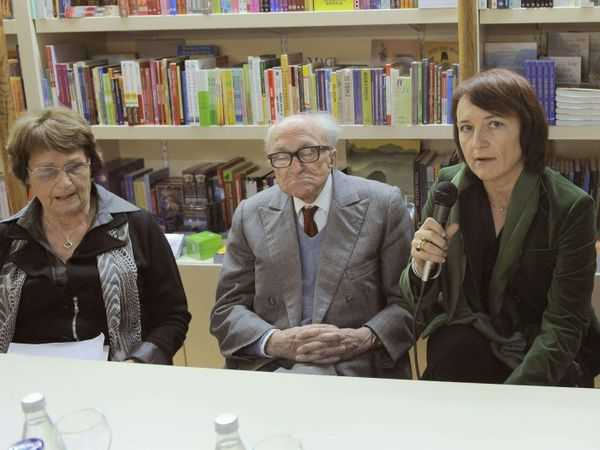
Boris Pahor at a public event together with the historians Milica Kacin Wohinz (left) and Marta Verginella (right)

After 1990, Pahor gained widespread recognition in Slovenia. He was awarded the Prešeren Award, the highest recognition for cultural achievements in Slovenia, in 1992. In 2008, he was awarded the Gold Order of Freedom. In May 2009, Pahor became a full member of the Slovenian Academy of Sciences and Arts.

2010 Documentary film

In 2010, a documentary Trmasti spomin (The Stubborn Memory) was screened on primetime on the Slovenian National Television Broadcast, featuring several famous public figures who speak about Pahor, including a Slovene philosopher, Evgen Bavčar, who lives and works in Paris, two Slovene historians from Trieste, Marta Verginella and Jože Pirjevec, Italian writer Claudio Magris from Trieste, French literary critic Antoine Spire, Italian journalist Paolo Rumiz, and Slovene literary historian Miran Košuta from Trieste.

Honorary Ljubljana Citizen proposal

In 2010, several civil associations proposed him as an honorary citizen of the Slovenian capital, Ljubljana. However, the proposal stalled at the commission for awards of the City Municipality of Ljubljana, who decided not to forward the proposal to the Ljubljana city council for a vote since Pahor publicly refused the idea because the Slovene minority in Italy (1920-1947) was not supported the way it should be during the period of Fascist Italianization, neither by right-wing or by left-wing Slovenian political elites in Ljubljana.

=== International recognition ===
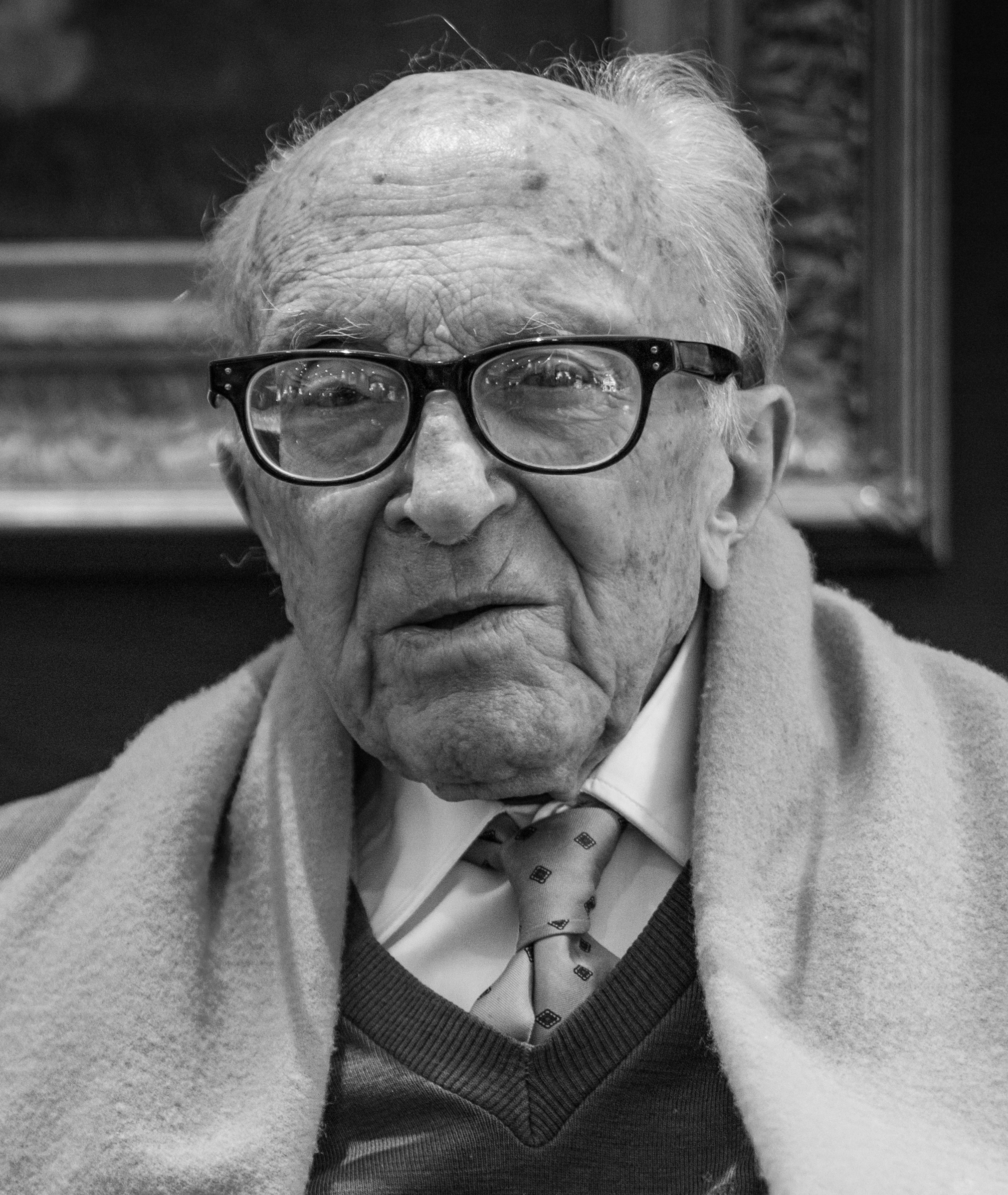
Pahor in June 2015

It was predicted by a Slovene philosopher Evgen Bavčar living in France – Pahor's friend whose mother worked in Trieste as Pahor's mother did – that as a Slovene writer, Pahor would be recognized by Italian state only after he would be recognized by France and Germany. As explained in the 2010 documentary (Note: The 2010 documentary Trmasti spomin (The Stubborn Memory) from 32m35s onwards) and in an interview with Pahor that was published in 2013 by Bukla Magazine, Italian publishers were not interested in publishing Pahor until French and German translations were published. Only after France and Germany recognized Pahor, his work began to be finally published in Italy in 2007.

In 2008, an influential article entitled Il caso Pahor" ("The Pahor Case"), deploring the fact that the author had remained unknown in Italy for so long and blaming the Italian nationalist milieu of Trieste for it, was published in the Italian journal La Repubblica:

Forty years were needed for such an important author to gain recognition in his own country. ... For too long, it was in someone's interest to hide that in the "absolutely Italian" city of Trieste there was somebody able to write great things in a language different from Italian.

In 2008, Pahor was interviewed for the first time by RAI (Italian National Public Television). The interview was aired as part of the Che tempo che fa, a primetime Sunday talk show on the Italian public TV's third channel.

In 2009, Pahor refused to accept an award by the mayor of Trieste Roberto Dipiazza because the mayor did not mention Italian Fascism alongside Nazism and communism, causing a controversy on the political right in Friuli-Venezia Giulia, resonating in the Italian media. However, support of Pahor's decision was voiced by renowned Italian left-wing intellectuals, including the astrophysicist and popular science writer Margherita Hack (Italian pronunciation: [marɡeˈriːta ˈak]) and the Trieste-based Association of Free and Equal Citizens (Associazione cittadini liberi ed uguali), offering an alternative award that would explicitly mention anti-Fascism.

=== International awards ===
In 2007, Pahor received the French National Order of the Legion of Honour from the French government. In 2009, Pahor was awarded the Cross of Honour for Science and Art by the Austrian government. He was also awarded with the Order of Merit of the Italian Republic of Italy.

=== Death ===
Pahor died at his home in Contovello/Kontovel, Trieste, Italy on 30 May 2022. He was 108 years old. He was buried in the local Trieste cemetery a week later in June 2022.

== Theatre adaptation ==
In 2010, a theatre adaptation of Pahor's novel Necropolis, directed by the Trieste Slovene director Boris Kobal, was staged in Trieste's Teatro Verdi, sponsored by the mayors of Trieste and Ljubljana, respectively Roberto Dipiazza and Zoran Janković.

The event was considered a "historical step" in the normalization of relations between Italians and Slovenes in Trieste, and was attended by numerous Slovenian and Italian dignitaries. After the performance, Pahor declared that he could finally feel himself to be a first-rate citizen of Trieste.

== Literary achievements and influence ==
Starting in the 1960s, Pahor's work started to become quite well known in Yugoslavia, but it did not gain wide recognition due to opposition from the Slovenian communist regime, which saw Pahor as a potential subversive figure. Nevertheless, he became one of the major moral referents for the new postwar generation of Slovene writers, including Drago Jančar, who has frequently pointed out his indebtedness to Pahor, especially in the essay The Man Who Said No, published in 1993 as one of the first comprehensive assessments of Pahor's literary and moral role in the postwar era in Slovenia.

Pahor's major works include Vila ob jezeru (A Villa by the Lake), Mesto v zalivu (The City on the Bay), Nekropola (Pilgrim among the Shadows), a trilogy about Trieste and the Slovene minority in Italy (1920–1947) Spopad s pomladjo (A Difficult Spring), Zatemnitev (Obscuration), V labirintu (In the Labyrinth), and Zibelka sveta (The Cradle of the World).

Five of his books have been translated into German.

== Political positions ==
Pahor was known for his lifelong defence of ethnic identity as the primary social identification. Pahor defined himself as a "Social Democrat in the Scandinavian sense of the word". However, he supported different centrist positions, from Christian Democracy and Christian Socialism to more liberal positions. In the late 1980s, he was sceptical of the idea of independent Slovenia, but later supported Jože Pučnik's vision of an independent Slovenian welfare state.

In 2007, he publicly supported the candidacy of the Liberal politician Mitja Gaspari for president of Slovenia. In 2009, he ran on the list of the South Tyrolean People's Party as a representative of the Slovene Union for the European Parliament. In 2011, before the Slovenian early elections, he publicly supported the Slovenian People's Party.

== Controversies ==
In December 2010, Pahor criticized the election of Peter Bossman as the mayor of Piran on the basis of his ethnicity. He stated that it is a "bad sign if one elects a foreigner for mayor." The statement echoed in the Slovenian and Italian media, and Pahor was accused of racism by some. He rejected these accusations, saying he had nothing against Bossman being black; he clarified his statement by saying that he would rather see a mayor from one of the indigenous ethnic groups from the region, either a Slovene or Istrian Italian.

In March 2012, the Italian right-wing newspaper Il Giornale published a book review of his autobiography titled "Nobody's Son", in which the book reviewer labels Pahor a "Slovene nationalist" and "negationist" for his agreement with the historian Alessandra Kersevan's criticism of historical revisionism in Italy regarding foibe. The book review reproached Pahor for making personal observations about the period of Yugoslav occupation of Trieste (between May and June 1945), implying that he witnessed the events, although he did not reside in the city at the time.

In August 2013, Pahor criticized Giorgio Napolitano and Janez Janša for not explicitly mentioning Italian Fascism alongside German Nazism and Slovenian/Yugoslav communism.

== Selected works (translated and published internationally) ==
- 1955 Vila ob jezeru (in French: La Villa sur le lac, in Italian: La villa sul lago, in German: Villa am See, in Serbian: Vila na jezeru), a novel
- 1955 Mesto v zalivu (in French: Quand Ulysse revient à Trieste, in German: Die Stadt in der Bucht), a novel
- 1956 Nomadi brez oaze (in German: Nomaden ohne Oase), a novel
- 1959 Kres v pristanu, also Grmada v pristanu (in Italian: Il rogo nel porto), short stories (including "Rože za gobavca")
- 1964 Parnik trobi nji (in French: L'Appel du navire, in Italian: Qui é proibito parlare, in German: Geheime Sprachgeschenke), a novel
- 1967 Nekropola (in Esperanto: Pilgrimanto inter ombroj (1993), in English: Pilgrim Among the Shadows (1995)/Nekropolis (2010), in French: Pèlerin parmi les ombres (1996), in German: Nekropolis (2001, 2003), in Catalan: Necròpolis (2004), in Finnish: Nekropoli (2006), in Italian: Necropoli (2008), in Serbian: Necropola (2009) (Note: See Cobiss record stating Serbian as language of translation.), in Spanish: Necrópolis (2010), in Dutch: Nekropolis (2011), in Croatian (Note: See book review stating Croatian as language of translation.): Nekropola (2012), in Portuguese: Necrópole (2013), in Swedish: Nekropol (2013)
- 1975 Zatemnitev (in French: Jours Obscurs, in German: Die Verdunkelung), a novel
- 1978 Spopad s pomladjo (in French: Printemps difficile, in Italian: Una primavera difficile, in German: Kampf mit dem Frühling), a reprint of the novel 1958 Onkraj pekla so ljudje
- 1984 V labirintu (in French: Dans le labyrinthe, in German: Im Labyrinth), a novel
- 1999 Zibelka sveta (in French: La Porte dorée, in Italian Il petalo giallo, in German Die Wiege der Welt), a novel
- 2003 Zgodba o reki, kripti in dvorljivem golobu (in French: Le Jardin des plantes), a novel
- Letteratura slovena del Litorale: vademecum / Kosovel a Trieste e altri scritti (2004) – short biographies, essays (in Italian)
- 2006 Trg Oberdan (in German: Piazza Oberdan), a novel
- 2006 Arrêt sur le Ponte Vecchio, in French only, a collection of his selected stories
- 2004 Blumen für einen Aussätzigen, in German only, a collection of his selected stories
- 2009 Tre volte no. Memorie di un uomo libero (in Slovenian: Trikrat ne: spomini svobodnega človeka), co-author Mila Orlić

== See also ==
- The Holocaust in art and literature
- Slovenian literature
