= Röchling Group =

German plastics engineering company

- Type: SE & Co. KG
- Industry: Plastics engineering
- Founded: 1822
- Headquarters: Mannheim, Germany
- Key people: Raphael Wolfram, Spokesman; Daniel Bühler; Martin Schüler; Evelyn Thome
- Revenue: €2.592 billion
- Number of employees: 11,681
- Website: www.roechling.com

Röchling SE & Co. KG is a plastics engineering company headquartered in Mannheim, Baden-Württemberg, Germany. The company has three divisions: Industrial, Automotive and Medical. Röchling employed 11,681 people in 83 locations across 25 countries (North and South America, Europe and Asia) in 2025, with annual sales of €2.592 billion in 2024.

== History ==
=== Beginnings ===
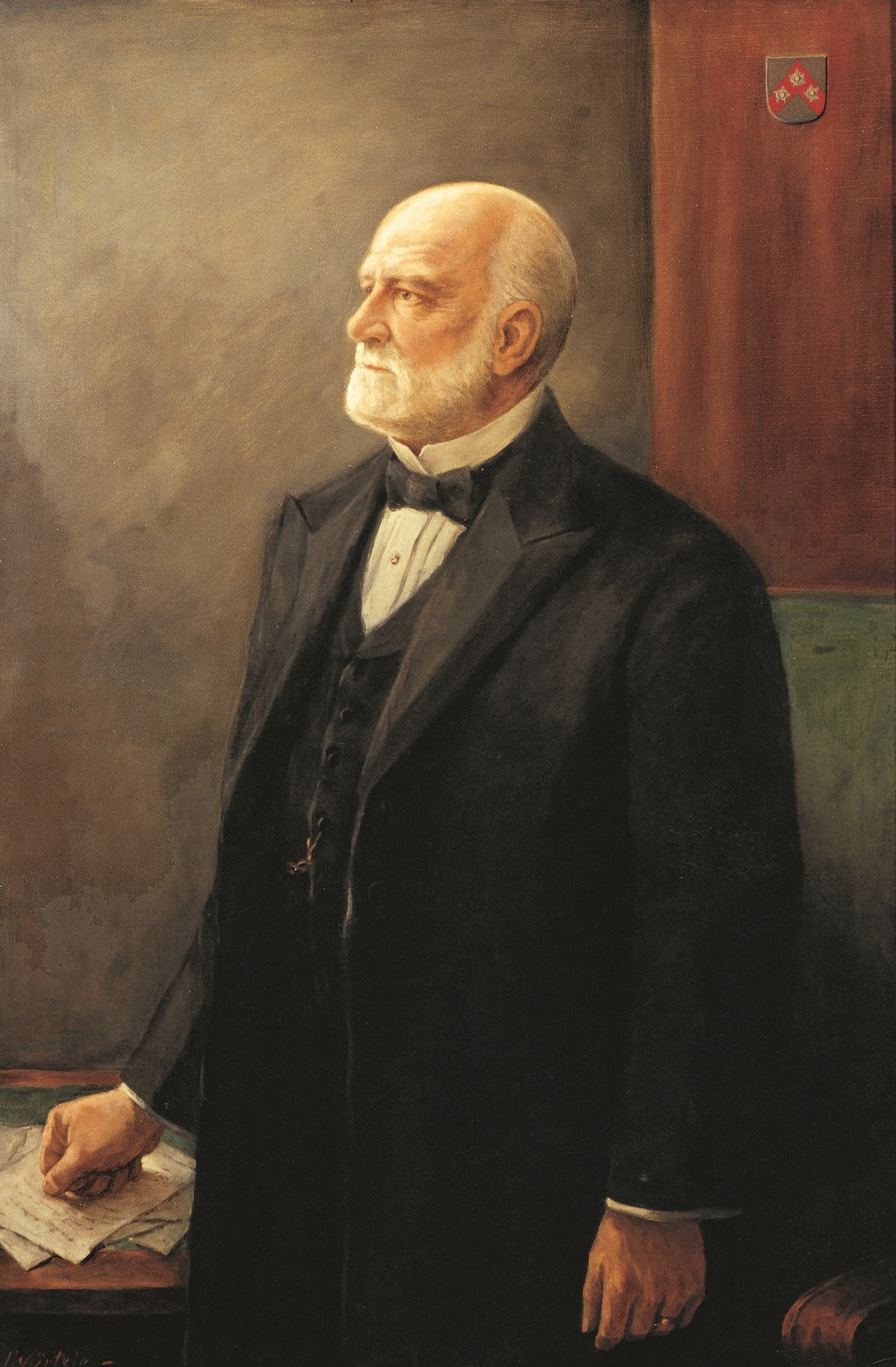
Carl Röchling (1827–1910) managed the company at the beginning of the 20th century alone for twenty years.

In 1822, Friedrich Ludwig Röchling founded a coal enterprise in Saarbrücken. After his death in 1836, his four nephews—Theodor, Ernst, Carl and Fritz—were left with the business, which was named Gebrüder Röchling KG. They began industrial coke and iron manufacturing in the mid-19th century. After the death of his brothers, Carl Röchling (1827–1910) managed the company alone for twenty years until the beginning of the 20th century.

He then bought the Völklingen Ironworks, which was run under the name Völklinger Eisenwerk Gebrüder Röchling. In 1860, the newly opened rail line near the production site, as well as the addition of parts of Elsass and Lothringen to the German empire after the war 1870/71, contributed to the growth of the iron mill. Völklingen's first blast furnace went into operation in 1883.

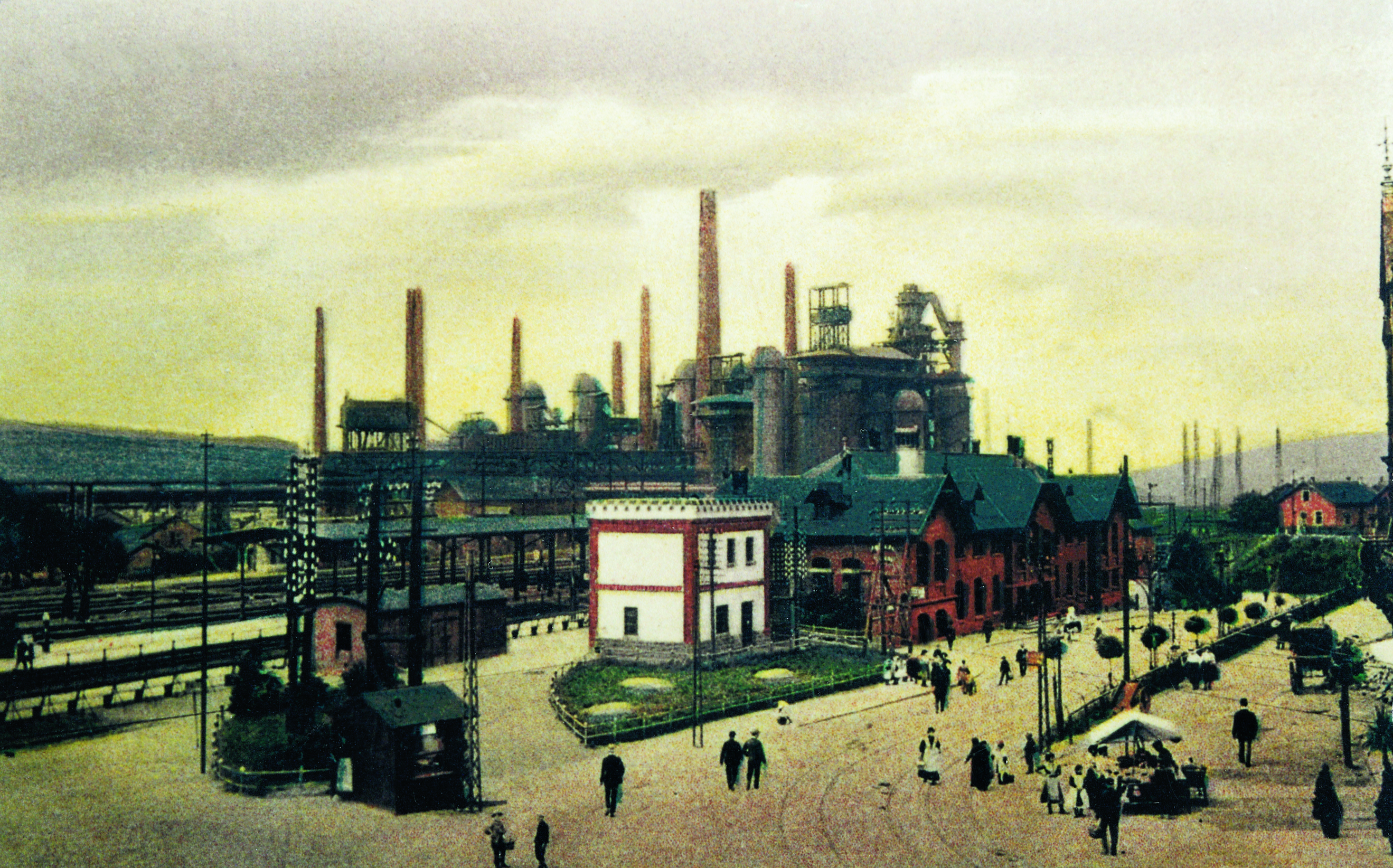
View from the station in Völklingen onto the iron and steel works of the Röchling company (1910)

After the death of his father Carl in 1898, Hermann Röchling (1872–1955) became general director of the company. Under his supervision, the ironworks developed into a “modern” blast furnace factory, which could also satisfy the rising demand for high-grade steel.

=== World War I ===
Right after the beginning of World War I, production of the iron works was adapted to meet the requirements of the war. Key changes included a dedicated factory to produce a wide variety of artillery projectiles. In addition, a large part of the material needed for the production of the steel helmets of the German army was produced in Völklingen.

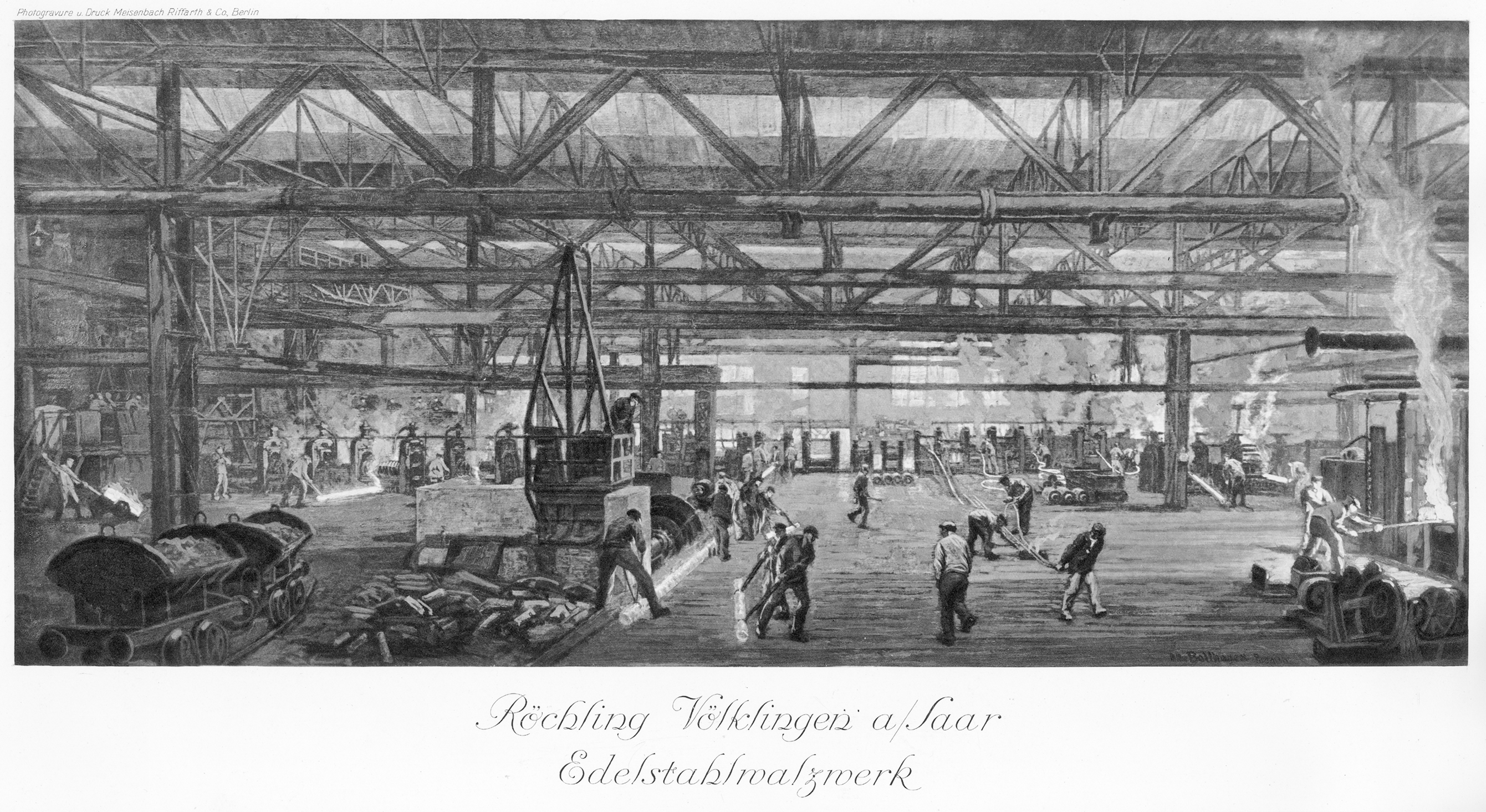
High-grade steel mill in Völklingen (1920)

After the end of the war, the French revoked the Röchling family's ownership of the iron mill in Diedenhofen and the iron ore pits in Lothringen, as well as all locations in France. A military court sentenced Hermann Röchling in absentia to ten years in prison for dismantling French operations in the occupied territories.

=== 1920–1945 ===
In the 1920s, the group included not only companies in the mining industry, but also banks and trading houses as well as extensive land and real estate. Hermann Röchling acquired further companies, including the “Berliner Holzveredelung GmbH” as the first plastics company in 1922, from which today's Röchling Engineering Plastics SE & Co. KG developed, which was based in Haren, Emsland. Politically, the "patriarch" sat down for the reintegration of the Saarland, which has been under the League of Nations Mandate until 1935. In 1935, he joined the NSDAP and was an armor advisory council member of the Reich Ministry of War, in 1938 appointed “Wehrwirtschaftsführer” and in 1942 he was given the position of "Reich Commissioner for Iron and Steel in the Occupied Territories". During the Second World War, the Saarland-based company produced weapons such as the "Röchling shell" in large numbers in its electric furnace facility.

Because of industrial exploitation of the occupied territories, "increase of the war potential of the Third Reich and considerable role in the execution of the program of deportation for the purpose of forced labor," Hermann Röchling was sentenced by a French military court to a ten-year imprisonment plus asset expropriation in 1949 and was deprived of his civil rights. He was released after two years of imprisonment.

=== Second half of the 20th century ===
In 1956, following encouragement from chancellor Konrad Adenauer, the company bought arms manufacturer Rheinmetall Berlin AG, the equipment supplier of the newly founded Bundeswehr. The Völklingen iron works was under French tribunal administration until 1956, when it was returned to the Röchling family. In the same year, Ernst Röchling, a nephew of Hermann Röchling, became head of the company in Völklingen. In 1960 the company was divided into two holding companies: "Röchling Brothers KG" (KG Gebr. Röchling) and “Industry Management Röchling GmbH,” which was renamed Röchling Industry Management GmbH (RIV) in 1972. It included all listed companies, including the investment in Rheinmetall AG.

The 1960s and 1970s were shaped by the coal crisis and the following steel crisis for the Röchling Group. The company responded to the decline in revenue in these areas with diversification, and the complete withdrawal from the steel industry and the Saarland. In 1978 the “Völklinger Hütte” was sold to Arbed, today's Saarstahl AG.

Instead, the Röchling Group acquired holdings and complete companies in the fields of mechanical engineering, telecommunications, electrical installation, franking systems, measurement and control technology. With the acquisition of the Seeber Group and Sustaplast KG, the declared expansion of the plastics processing sector began in the 1980s.

=== 21st century ===
At the beginning of the 21st century, the conglomerate employed more than 41,000 people in more than 300 subsidiaries and associated companies and generated sales of around €6.1 billion. The biggest source of revenue was the electronics and defense group, Rheinmetall, in which Röchling held a stake of 42.1 percent.

According to the Manager Magazin, the Röchling Group had become "entangled" with the company's strong diversification, branching, and other ramifications. The expansion of the subsidiary Rheinmetall under the controversial CEO Hans Brauner had increased sales, but brought no returns. Therefore, in 2001, Röchling decided on a fundamental change of strategy under the new non-family director Georg Duffner: abandonment of the conglomerate and further expansion of the business unit plastics processing. In 2004, Röchling sold its majority stake in Rheinmetall at a price of €570 million. In 2005, this was followed by the sale of Francotyp-Postalia, a manufacturer of franking and inserting machines and the deficit telecommunications company DeTeWe.

During the conversion to a plastic producer, all family members withdrew from the core business in accordance with the shareholders' resolution and moved to supervisory bodies. In 2001, Klaus Greinert, son-in-law of Richard Röchling and former managing director, joined the advisory board and became chairman of the family council. There he replaced Kurt Wigand Freiherr von Salmuth, who had been a member of various family committees since 1964. Bernd Michael Hönle, managing director since 1994, was the last operationally active family member to join the supervisory board in 2008.

The restructuring started in 1978 and the company moved towards becoming a pure plastics processor with the areas of high-performance plastics and automotive plastics. According to a Handelsblatt article from 2004, the strong focus on plastics at that time also served to reduce debt and improve profitability as the Group's electronics sector was struggling. The process was completed in 2006, when the last electronics company and a cold rolling mill were sold, which brought the Röchling Group a profit increase. In 2008, Röchling decided to produce engineering plastics as its third product division, and acquired its first medical device company following a concerted drive to expand its footprint in the medical industry. The Group purchased US-based Precision Medical Products and German medical supplier Frank Plastic AG in 2018.

In 2009 Röchling still had 56 subsidiaries instead of 327 at the time of the conglomerate.

In 2011, sales exceeded the threshold of one billion euros, with Röchling employing around 6600 people worldwide. In 2012, the Röchling Group invested more than €140 million and expanded in Brazil, India, Australia and China.

This was followed in 2016 by a first production site in Mexico and a joint venture in Japan. In 2014, the company was renamed Röchling SE & Co. KG. In 2016, former CEO Georg Duffner was replaced by Ludger Bartels and the divisions reorganized. In addition to the existing automotive division, the previous second division –High Performance Plastic – was renamed "Industrial" and the "Medical Division" was founded. From January 2018 to September 2021, Hanns-Peter Knaebel was chairman of the executive board of the Röchling Group and responsible for the Automotive division. After Prof. Knaebel left the company, Rainer Schulz took over as CEO ad interim. Following a change in the governance structure, the Röchling Group did not have a CEO from June 2022. Raphael Wolfram was appointed Spokesman of the Group Executive Board.

Martin Schüler joined the Executive Board of the Röchling Group on November 1, 2024. Prior to this, he was CEO of the HBPO division of the French automotive supplier OPmobility (formerly Plastic Omnium) for almost 20 years. Martin Schüler replaced Raphael Wolfram as CEO of Röchling Automotive in February 2025. Raphael Wolfram in turn succeeded Franz Lübbers as CEO of Röchling Industrial in July 2025. The latter retired after more than 50 years at Röchling. Raphael Wolfram moved to the Industrial division as early as February 2025.

== Enterprise ==
=== Management ===
Company decisions are determined by the Shareholders' Committee, the Advisory Board and the executive board of the Röchling Group. In 2020, more than 200 members of the Röchling family belonged to the shareholders.

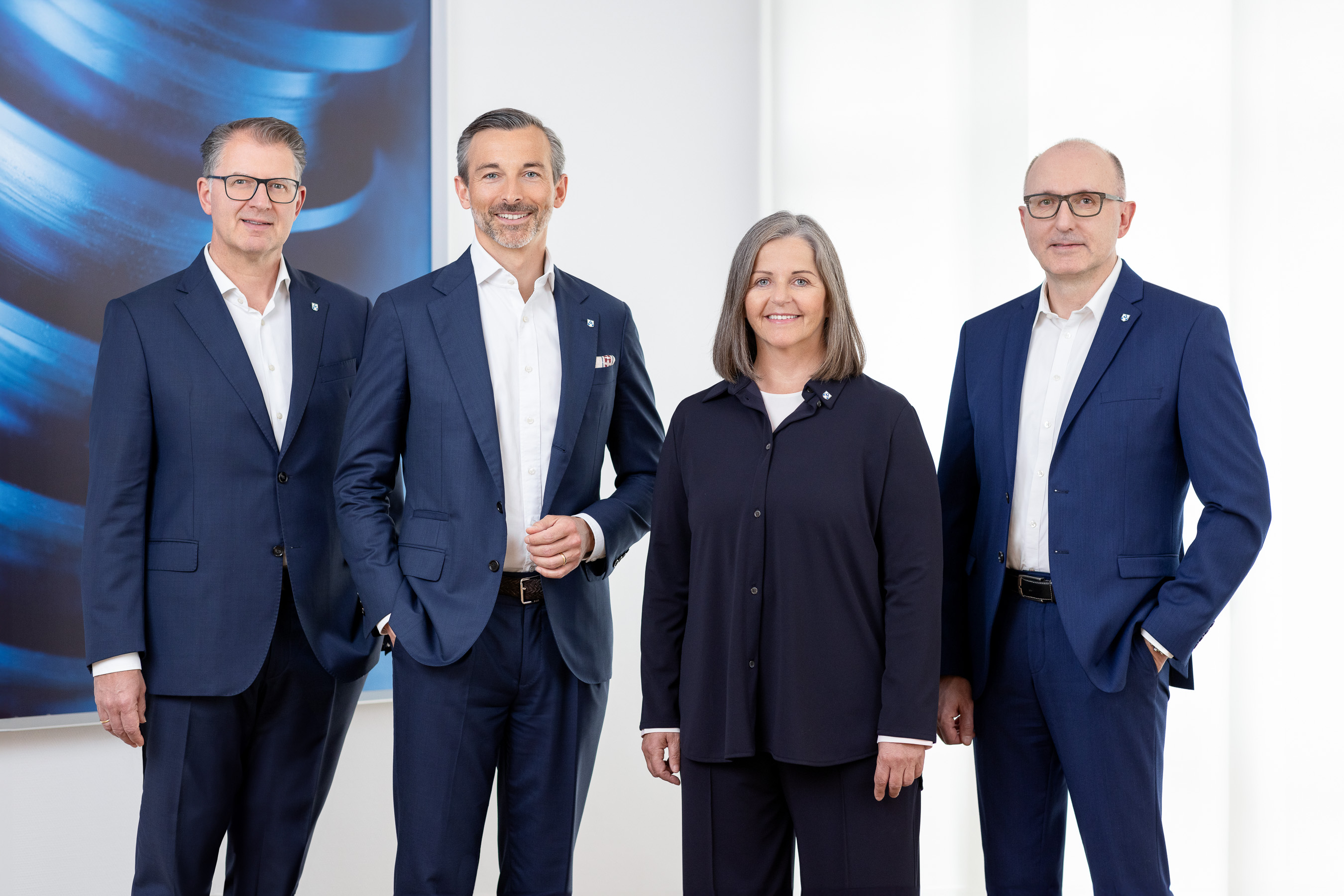
The Executive Board of the Röchling Group in 2024 (from left) Martin Schüler, Raphael Wolfram, Evelyn Thome, and Dr. Daniel Bühler.

Johannes Freiherr von Salmuth, a direct descendant of Friedrich Röchling in the sixth generation, took over as chair of the supervisory bodies: In 2008 (Shareholders' Committee) and in 2010 (Advisory Council). His deputies are also two Röchling family members, Gregor Greinert (Shareholders' Committee) and Carl Peter Thürmel (Advisory Council). Rainer Schulz has been CEO of the Röchling Group since September 2021 and is responsible for the Medical division. He replaced the Prof. Dr. Hanns-Peter Knaebel who left the company. Raphael Wolfram was appointed to the executive board of the Röchling Group as of Januar 1, 2022. There, he is responsible for the Automotive division. He has acted as spokesman for the executive board since June 2022. In July 2022, Dr. Daniel Bühler joined the company as the new chief executive officer of Röchling Medical. He was also appointed to the executive board of the Röchling Group. In November 2024, Martin Schüler was appointed to the Executive Board of the Röchling Group. He heads the Automotive division since February 2025. Former Automotive CEO, Raphael Wolfram, moved to the Industrial division, where he took over from Franz Lübbers in July 2025.

Advisory Board (Beirat):

- Gregor Greinert (chairman)
- Dr. Carl Peter Thürmel (Co-chairman)
- Dr. David Haenggi-Bally
- Isabel Hartung
- Uta Kemmerich-Keil
- Prof. Klaus Nehring
- Uwe Röhrhoff
- Johannes Freiherr von Salmuth
- Rainer Schulz
- Friederike Weber

=== Business areas ===
As of 2016 the Röchling Group is divided into the three divisions: industrial, automotive and medical. 36.5 percent of sales are generated in Germany, 32.8 percent in the rest of Europe, followed by America (18.3 percent) and Asia (12.4 percent). In Germany, the Röchling Group operates 20 locations: Arnstadt, Bad Grönenbach-Thal, Brensbach, Cologne, Haren, Lahnstein, Laupheim, Lützen, Mannheim, Munich, Nentershausen, Neuhaus am Rennweg, Peine, Roding, Ruppertsweiler, Troisdorf, Waldachtal, Weidenberg, Worms, and Xanten.

==== Industry ====
The product range of the Industrial division comprises semi-finished and finished parts made of duroplastic and thermoplastic materials. Semifinished products include plates, round, hollow and flat bars, molded parts and profiles. Finished parts include machined thermoplastic components for industrial applications. This division employs 4,623 people in 43 locations.

==== Automotive ====
The Automotive division employs 5,733 people in 38 company locations. It supplies automotive manufacturers and system suppliers with plastic applications in the aerodynamics, propulsion, battery solutions, and structural lightweight sectors. According to Röchling, declared goals are the reduction of emissions, weight and fuel consumption in the automotive industry, for which a restructuring of the division is planned.

==== Medical ====
The Medical division manufactures plastic components for customers in the medical and pharmaceutical industries and is divided into the areas of diagnostics, fluid management, pharma as well as surgery and interventional. The products are used in drug delivery systems, primary packaging, surgical instruments and diagnostic disposables. This division has six locations with 1,267 employees.

== Röchling charity foundation ==
The non-profit Röchling Stiftung GmbH was founded in 1990. It is financed by the start-up capital provided by the entrepreneurial family, by limited partnerships granted and inherited from shareholders in Röchling SE & Co. KG, investment income and cash donations. The foundation focuses on the field of plastics and the environment and wants to make a contribution to reducing the environmental impact of plastics worldwide. To this end, the foundation supports scientific research into new concepts for reducing plastic waste and improving recycling, as well as projects in sustainable development education.

The foundation has sponsored collection centers for plastic waste in Mumbai, India, and financed the construction of the "Manatee" waste collection vessel owned by “One Earth - One Ocean” for cleansing the oceans. In 2018 the foundation supported the development of the "Manatee" into a recycling system at sea, exploration of a possibly plastic-decomposing insect larva along with collection and recycling of plastic waste in the Ganges delta.
