= Georg Duffner =

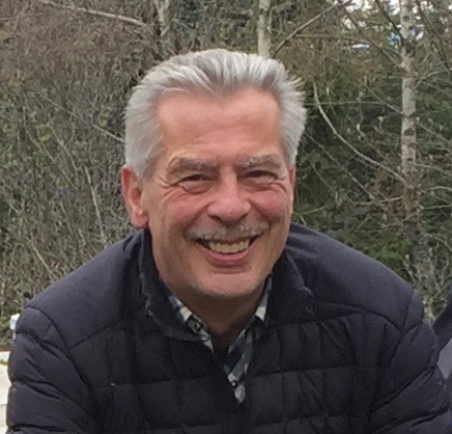
Georg Duffner (2019).

Georg Duffner (born May 18 1954 in Freiburg im Breisgau, Germany) is a German businessman and business consultant. He was CEO of the Witzenmann Group (1990–1994) und of Vinci Germany (1995–2001) as well as Chairman of the Board of the Röchling Group (2001–2016). He was politically active in the 68 movement and has been a member of the German Green Party since 2011.

== Education and career ==
Duffner visited the Berthold Gymnasium (Secondary Grammar School) in Freiburg. He then studied Business Administration and Economics at Mannheim University (he received a scholarship from the German Studienstiftung) as well as computer science in Karlsruhe from 1980 to 1982. After his studies he started at the Witzenmann Group where he was promoted to CEO in 1990. In 1995 he joined the German Executive Board of the Vinci Group, the world market leader in construction services. In 1997 he also took over the position of Chairman of the Board of Management of the G+H Group in Ludwigshafen, Germany. In 2001 he joined the Mannheim Röchling Group as CEO, where he also took over the Automobile Division. In 2016 Duffner decided not to extend his contract as CEO and was voted into the Supervisory Board of the Röchling Group. He is since then active as business and management consultant and holds a number of mandates in various supervisory boards.

== Politics ==
Duffner began his political activities in 1968 in protest against the German Notstandsgesetze (Emergency Acts), later against the Vietnam War and the 1973 Chilean coup d'état. From 1976 he was a member of the Maoist Kommunistischer Bund Westdeutschland (KBW). He stood as a candidate for the KBW for the general elections 1976 in Kaiserslautern and 1980 in Karlsruhe. In 1982 Duffner was on the founders of the green alternative Karlsruhe city newspaper Gegendruck, where he worked as an editor until 1990. Since 2011 he has been a member of the Green Party. In 2017 he was elected to the local executive committee of the party for Karlsruhe/Durlach.

== Publications ==
- Georg Duffner: Natur und Ökonomie – Einige Überlegungen zu einer umweltbewussten Unternehmensführung. In: Jolanda Rothfuß u. a. (Hrsg.): Konstanten für Wirtschaft und Gesellschaft, Konstanz, 1993, ISBN 978-3926937032.
- Georg Duffner: Mechanistisches oder evolutionäres Management – Die Selbstorganisation im Unternehmen. In: Werner G. Faix u. a. (Hrsg.): Innovation zwischen Ökonomie und Ökologie, Landsberg/Lech, 1995, ISBN 978-3478352802.
