= 1975 Zaliv Scandal =

The 1975 Zaliv Scandal was a political scandal in SFR Yugoslavia that began when the summary killing of 12,000 Slovene Home Guard war prisoners by the Yugoslav Communist regime, which occurred in May and June 1945, was publicly discussed and condemned for the first time after World War II in 1975.

== The scandal ==
The scandal followed after the killings were condemned by Edvard Kocbek in an interview that appeared as a special edition of the journal Zaliv; it was written by two Slovene writers from Trieste, Boris Pahor and Alojz Rebula, and published in Italy. The interview was titled Edvard Kocbek: pričevalec našega časa (Edvard Kocbek: Witness to Our Time) and served as a pretext to launch a massive denigration campaign against Kocbek by the state-controlled Yugoslav media. Kocbek, who lived in Yugoslavia, was put under constant secret service surveillance until his death in 1981. The international pressure on Yugoslavia, especially the intervention of the German writer Heinrich Böll, was probably the main element that protected Kocbek from judicial prosecution.

Boris Pahor and Alojz Rebula, who interviewed Kocbek, were banned from entering Yugoslavia for several years and were only able to enter it to attend Kocbek's funeral.
