= Bukla Magazine =

Slovenian book review magazine

- Editor: Samo Rugelj
- Frequency: Monthly
- Circulation: 30,000
- Publisher: UMco
- First issue: 2005; 21 years ago
- Country: Slovenia
- Based in: Ljubljana
- Language: Slovene
- Website: www.bukla.si

The Bukla Magazine (in Slovene: Revija Bukla) (bukla is a colloquial Slovene term for "a book") is a free Slovenian monthly magazine in which current Slovene non-fiction and fiction books are reviewed.

== History and profile ==
Bukla is issued free of charge since 2005. The magazine has its headquarters in Ljubljana and is published by UMco.

Most reviews are done by in-house staff, and some also by outside reviewers commissioned by the magazine to do the review.

Each issue contains an interview with an author who appears on the cover of the magazine, starting with its 69th issue. The authors interviewed by Bukla Magazine include Boris Pahor, Renata Salecl, Goran Vojnović, Miha Mazzini, Evald Flisar, Jani Virk, Milan Jesih, Aleš Debeljak, Mladen Dolar, and Slavoj Žižek.

30,000 copies are distributed to libraries, book stores, cinemas and other cultural institutions, where they can be picked up by visitors.

Online copies of the printed version are available at the Issuu service.

== See also ==
- List of magazines in Slovenia
