= Guillaume d'Andlau =

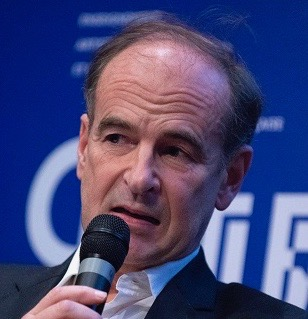
- d'Andlau in 2019
- Born: 1962 (age 62–63)
- Education: Institut d'Etudes Politiques de Paris; Institut des hautes études de défense nationale School of Advanced Study
- Occupation: Director of former concentration camp
- Children: 3

Guillaume d'Andlau (born in 1962) is the owner of the ruined castle of Andlau and the president of the Association for the fortified castles of Alsace.

== Biography ==
=== Family ===
He is a descendant of the Andlau family, a very old family of Alsatian nobility.

=== Career ===
Guillaume d'Andlau began his professional career at the United Nations Development Programme (UNDP) in Laos. He volunteered to go to Rwanda during the 1994 genocide and was sent as a volunteer for the French Red Cross to Goma in Zaire, now the Democratic Republic of Congo. He remained with the French Red Cross as a program manager and later as the executive director of international operations until the end of the 1990s. In 1999, he was appointed director of the Economic and Social Council of Alsace.

He later worked as the head of sponsorship at Crédit Agricole SA and then as a "communications officer" for the same bank in 2012.

From 2019 to the end of 2023, Guillaume d'Andlau served as the director of the European Centre for the Deported Resistance Fighter. He succeeded historian Frédérique Neau-Dufour in this role.

Politics

In 2016, Guillaume d'Andlau ran, unsuccessfully, in the by-election as an independent candidate in the first constituency of Bas-Rhin. He garnered nearly 6% of the vote. In the 2017 legislative election, he sought the nomination of La République En Marche but failed to secure it and did not stand as a candidate.

Associative Engagement

In 2000, Guillaume d'Andlau founded the Association des amis du château d'Andlau, dedicated to the preservation and maintenance of the family-owned, ruinous château, which has been in his family since the 13th century. He became the owner of the château in 2004. He has invited various cultural figures, including the artist Frank Morzuch, to the château to help promote its heritage.

In 2010, he founded the Fondation Passions Alsace, which he presided over for seven years. He is now the honorary president of the foundation.

In 2013, he established the Association pour les châteaux forts d'Alsace, an organization dedicated to the protection of Alsace’s castles, and served as its president until the summer of 2023. He continues as its honorary president.

=== Rewards ===
- Chevalier de la Légion d'honneur
- Officier de l'ordre national du Mérite
- Officier de l'ordre des Arts et des Lettres
- Prix Patrimoine 2017 pour Le chemin des châteaux forts d'Alsace
- Prix patrimoine de la Fondation Stéphane Bern pour l’Histoire et le Patrimoine

== Books ==
  - Les fêtes retrouvées, collection Les Livres du Patrimoine, Éditions Casterman, 1997
  - Carnavals en France, Hier et aujourd’hui, collection Fleur’Art, Éditions Fleurus, 1996
  - Vivre la Nation, collection Forum, Gallimard, 2000
  - L'Action humanitaire, Que sais-je ?, 1998
  - Le château d'Andlau hier et aujourd'hui (Dir.), Le Verger Éditeur, 2015
  - Le Haut-Andlau, un château, deux tours, sept siècles d'histoire, (Dir) Association des amis du château d'Andlau, 2016
  - Les châteaux forts autour du mont Sainte-Odile, La couronne de pierre des Ducs d'Alsace (Dir.), I.D. L'édition, 2019
  - Le KL Natzweiler-Struthof, un camp de concentration en Alsace Annexée, préface de Johann Chapoutot, I.D. L'édition, 2023
