= Röchling Foundation =

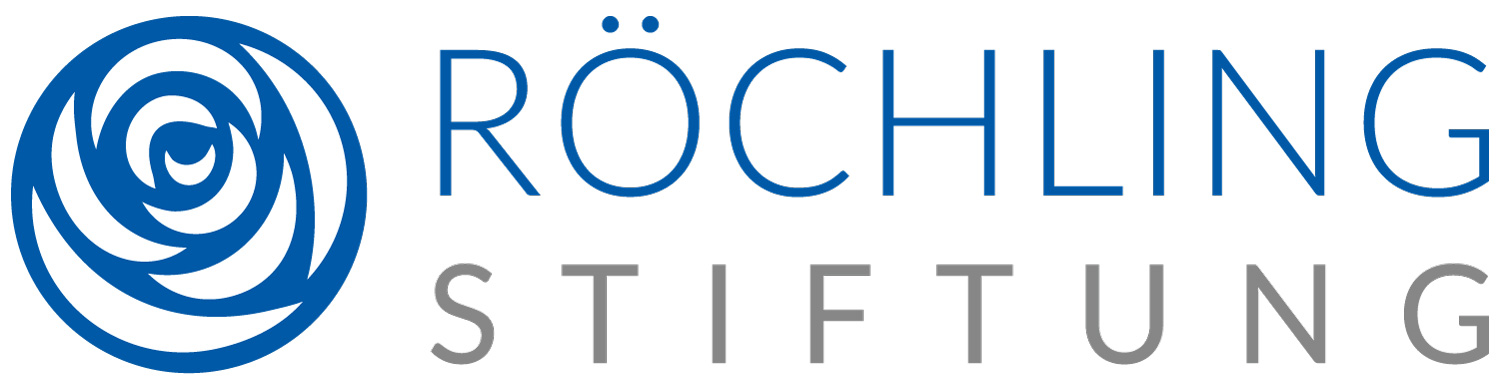
- Type: Ltd.
- Founded: 1990
- Headquarters: Mannheim
- Owner: Board of Trustees Annunziata Gräfin Hoensbroech (Chairwoman), Amelie Hauch (Deputy), Felicitas Andresen, Bernd Bäzner, David Stather. Shareholders' Committee Sabine Thürmel, Friederike Werner, Johannes Freiherr von Salmuth Management Jobst-Friedrich von Unger, Marian Holtwiesche
- Website: www.roechling-stiftung.de/en

The Röchling Foundation GmbH is a non-profit based in Mannheim. Established in 1990, it is financed by the start-up capital provided by the Röchling family of entrepreneurs, limited partnership shares in Röchling SE & Co. KG donated and bequeathed by shareholders, as well as investment income and monetary donations.

Since 2018, the Röchling Foundation has been focusing on the topic of "Plastics & Environment" and aims to contribute to reducing the environmental impact of plastics worldwide. It does not see itself as a mere funding partner, but is primarily interested in establishing new, cross-sector collaborations and networks.

== Operational activities ==
=== Polyproblem report ===
Under the program title "Polyproblem", the Röchling Foundation regularly publishes reports on the latest developments and most pressing issues relating to plastics and the environment, in collaboration with experts from science and industry. In workshops, excursions, and webinars, stakeholders from companies, civil society, science, and politics share their knowledge and develop joint solutions.

The Polyproblem reports published to date

| Year | Title |
|---|---|
| 2019 | Plastic and Environment. Challenges, Actors, and Perspectives |
| 2020 | The Wast of Others. About the Responsibility for the Flood of Plastic |
| 2020 | Treasure Hunt. Faults and Flaws of the Recycling Industry - and a Glimpse into a Possible Future |
| 2021 | Straws on Trial. The Real Accomplishment of Single-used Plastic Bans |
| 2022 | Buy Your Way Out. The Rocky Road to Plastic Neutrality |
| 2023 | The Circularity Code. How digitalization helps with the plastic transition - and how it does not |
| 2025 | Mind the Gap. Plastic Waste Between Values And Reality |

== Funding ==
The Röchling Foundation supports civil society organizations and occasionally also scientific research projects that are committed to the transition from a linear to a circular way of life and economy - with a particular focus on preventing plastic waste in the environment. In 2024, the Röchling Foundation provided more than €900,000 in funding for projects in the field of plastics and the environment.

The Röchling Foundation does not have a fixed funding program. Instead, it continuously reviews incoming cooperation proposals. The focus is on projects that:

- contribute to the prevention of plastic waste in the environment,
- strengthen circular thinking and action,
- create new alliances or expand existing networks,
- make knowledge, methods, and good practices accessible
- provide inspiration for social change.

== Organization ==
=== Board of Trustees ===
The Board of Trustees of the Röchling Foundation determines the content of the foundation's work, develops its strategy, and decides on projects and collaborations. Annunziata Hoensbroech is the chairwoman of the Board of Trustees of the Röchling Foundation, with Amelie Hauch as her deputy. Felicitas Andresen, Bernd Bäzner, and David Stather also sit on the board of trustees.

=== Shareholders' Committee ===
The Röchling Foundation GmbH has three shareholders, Sabine Thürmel (chairwoman), Friederike Werner, and Johannes Freiherr von Salmuth, who represent the entire entrepreneurial family in a fiduciary capacity. They are responsible for managing the foundation's assets, setting the annual financial framework for the foundation's activities, and deciding on the discharge of the board of trustees and the management.

The patroness of the Röchling Foundation was Karin Röchling (died November 18, 2025), who rendered outstanding services to the Röchling Foundation as a long-standing member of the board of trustees and with particular commitment, and who also acted in an advisory capacity.

=== Management ===
The management, consisting of Jobst-Friedrich von Unger and Marian Holtwiesche, is responsible for the foundation's operational work.
