= Otto Bickenbach =

German physician (1901–1971)

Otto Bickenbach (born 11 March 1901 in Ruppichteroth in the Rhineland, died 26 November 1971 in Siegburg) was a German internist and professor at the University of Strasbourg. He joined the Nazi Party on 1 May 1933. Between June and August 1943 in the Natzweiler-Struthof concentration camp, Bickenbach and his assistant, Helmut Rühl, conducted a series of tests with poisonous gas in gas chamber experiments with phosgene. More than 50 prisoners, mainly gypsies transferred for medical experiments from Auschwitz, were murdered in the course of these experiments.

== After the war ==
Otto Bickenbach was arrested on 17 March 1947 and summarily deported to France to face trial. In the following interrogation, Bickenbach and his associate Eugen Haagen denied responsibility for the experiments and stated they were solely following the orders of Heinrich Himmler. Even so, it became clear that Bickenbach and his associates had free rein when it came to the methodology behind the experiments, and their parts in the crimes were found satisfactory enough to take them to trial. In January 1954, Bickenbach was sentenced to a life sentence of forced labour but was pardoned following a retrial in 1955, being found repentant and ideologically sound by a military court in Metz. Bickenbach returned to Germany and there established his medical practice, his return to medicine cemented by support from the medical board in Cologne, who in 1966 came to the verdict that he had not violated his professional ethics despite his actions during the war.
