= Antoine Spire =

French essayist and journalist (1946–2026)

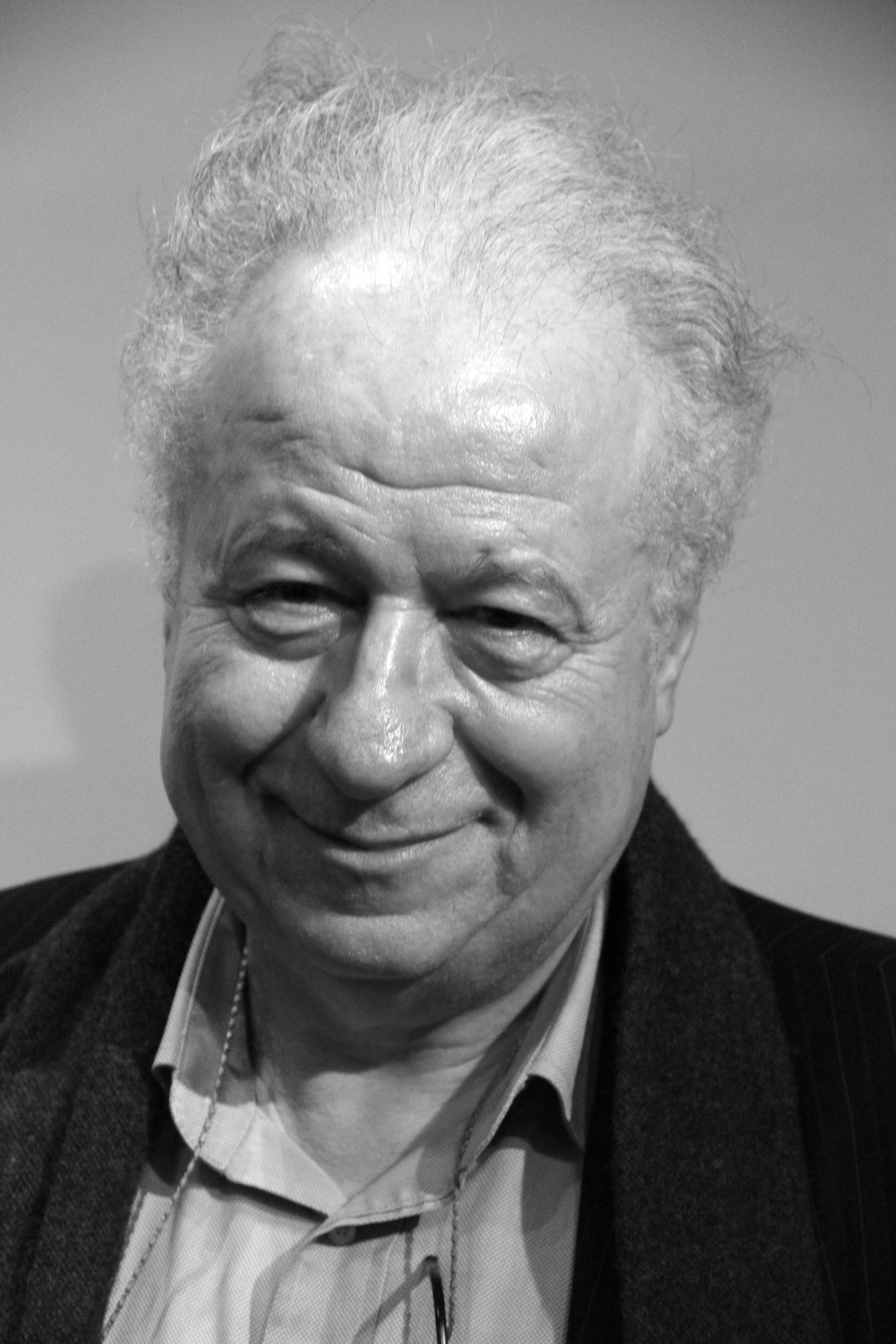
- Spire in 2013
- Born: 31 March 1946; Paris, France
- Died: 26 October 2026 (aged 80); Ivry-sur-Seine, France
- Occupations: Essayist, journalist
- Political party: PCF

Antoine Spire (31 March 1946 – 26 October 2026) was a French essayist and journalist. A member of the French Communist Party, he served as editor-in-chief of Le Matin de Paris, and as editorial advisor of Le Monde.

Spire died in Ivry-sur-Seine on 26 October 2026, at the age of 80.
