= Between Silk and Cyanide =

Book by Leo Marks

Between Silk and Cyanide: A Codemaker's War 1941–1945
- First edition
- Author: Leo Marks
- Language: English
- Subject: Autobiography
- Publisher: HarperCollins
- Publication date: 1998
- Publication place: United Kingdom
- Media type: Print (hardcover)
- Pages: 614
- ISBN: 0-00-255944-7

Between Silk and Cyanide: A Codemaker's War 1941–1945 is a memoir of public interest by former Special Operations Executive (SOE) cryptographer Leo Marks, describing his work including memorable events, actions and omissions of his colleagues during the Second World War. It was first published in 1998.

== Date ==
The book was written in the early 1980s. It was published on UK Government approval in 1998.

== Synopsis ==
Leo Marks joins the Special Operations Executive (SOE) as a cryptographer at the age of 22, having been rejected by Bletchley Park. Much of his job involves breaking "indecipherables", garbled messages sent from agents in Nazi-occupied Europe operating under pressure. These often require Marks and the women from First Aid Nursing Yeomanry (FANY) to try thousands of variations of the key to find the intended message.

Marks quickly realises that the poem codes SOE agents are using are inadequate for security, and he begins a quest to improve the system. He sets up a "ditty box" for SOE staff to contribute custom-written poems that the enemy could not find in books. The box becomes a running theme through the memoir, with Marks composing poems inspired by the events in the story, ranging from comic and vulgar to serious. He writes The Life That I Have in memory of a girlfriend named Ruth who dies in a plane crash, and later gives it to SOE agent Violette Szabo.

In flashbacks, Marks recounts his childhood interest in cryptography, from reading Edgar Allan Poe's The Gold-Bug as well as breaking the code that his father had used to note the prices paid for second-hand books in his bookshop Marks & Co at 84 Charing Cross Road.

While the rate of indecipherables rises across SOE agents as a whole, Marks notices that the Dutch agents are virtually never sending indecipherables, or indeed making any coding mistakes at all, even the prearranged deliberate mistakes that were intended as part of a duress code system. Marks believes that indecipherables are inevitable from agents under the pressure of war, and reasons that SOE is not communicating with the Dutch agents at all, but with a Nazi intelligence officer named Hermann Giskes. Unable to convince the Dutch section of SOE that their agents are compromised, Marks is compelled to brief further agents as normal, knowing that they will be captured by the Gestapo as soon as they are parachuted into the Netherlands. He sets about trying to catch Giskes in the act, sending indecipherables and even "HH" for "Heil Hitler" to gauge Giskes's reactions. Marks's suspicions eventually prove correct; the Germans referred to the deception as Operation North Pole, or the Englandspiel.

Marks is promoted to head of agents' codes and continues campaigning to have poem codes replaced with something more secure. His first improvement is called worked-out keys (WOKs). These are double transposition ciphers like the poem codes, but they use randomised, printed keys that are burned and forgotten after use so that the enemy cannot obtain past keys from a captured agent. The keys are to be printed on silk so that they will not rustle if the agent is frisked.

The next innovation is a letter one-time pad (LOP), which is more secure than a WOK but requires much more silk. Silk is in short supply during the war, and the book's title is a phrase that Marks uses when arguing over its cost: SOE is facing a choice between an agent's survival with the help of the printed silk, and having to take a cyanide suicide pill to avoid being tortured into revealing the code.

Marks creates a mental one-time pad (MOP) that brings unbreakable security without the need for silks, but proves so difficult for agents to implement that it is hardly used.

Throughout the memoir Marks briefs and supports many SOE agents, including "Tommy" Yeo-Thomas, Einar Skinnarland (leading a mission to sabotage a heavy water plant), Dick Mallaby (facilitating the Armistice of Cassibile) and Noor Inayat Khan.

In the run-up to D-Day Marks institutes Operation Gift-horse, an effort to disguise WOK and later LOP traffic as poem-code traffic in order to waste Nazi cryptographers' time attempting to break them. A separate effort floods the airwaves with meaningless messages as a way to mask the increase in genuine traffic that might reveal when an invasion is imminent.

SOE is disbanded after the war, with most of its staff transferred to the Secret Intelligence Service (known as "C"). Marks is offered a job there but rejects it and goes on to a peacetime career writing plays and films.
