= Leslie Fernandez =

British Army officer

Leslie Percival Fernandez
- Born: 22 March 1918; Bristol, England
- Died: 16 July 2009 (aged 91)
- Military career
- Allegiance: United Kingdom
- Branch: British Army
- Service years: 1940–1947
- Rank: Captain
- Service number: 336931
- Units: Royal Signals; Army Physical Training Corps; Military Operations 1 Special Forces
- Conflicts: Second World War
- Awards: Military Medal (1944); Croix de Guerre (1946); OBE (1972)
- Other work: British Foreign Service

Captain Leslie Percival Fernandez OBE, MM, C de G, (22 March 1918 – 16 July 2009) was an English army officer in Special Forces during the Second World War who had risen from the ranks. He was notable for having trained Violette Szabó, made famous by the 1958 film Carve Her Name with Pride starring Virginia McKenna, on which he was an advisor.

Fernandez started the war with the Royal Signals but soon transferred to the Army Physical Training Corps, which brought him into contact with SOE agents.

In early 1943, as a Colour Sergeant Major, he moved to Military Operations 1 based in Algiers to train for sabotage operations in southern France. In July 1944, Fernandez was dropped by US Air Force Liberator onto a plateau above Barcelonette, near Digne on the French-Italian border. The area has a strategically important pass called the Col de Larche (Italian Maddalena Pass) between the Cottian Alps and the Maritime Alps. Work to disrupt the possibility of a German counterattack against the US forces on the French side included blowing up the road in the Col de Larche, which remained blocked for two years. For this, Fernandez was awarded the Military Medal.

In December 1944, Fernandez received an Emergency Commission as a 2nd Lieutenant with Special Forces and worked with the Italian partisans as a British Liaison Officer. He was also BLO with the 6th Airborne Division in the Baltic before joining as Staff Officer PT to the 1st Allied Airborne Group HQ in London.

In 1947 he was listed as an officer with the rank of lieutenant with the Regular Army Reserve of Officers with the Devonshire Regiment as part of the Wessex Brigade. He received an extension on the reserve list as captain on 18 December 1950, which was renewed on 25 February 1954. He resigned his commission on 1 July 1959, retaining the honorary rank of captain.

Meanwhile, Fernandez had joined the British Foreign Service in intelligence, working mainly in Africa and the Middle East. He became Her Majesty's Consul at Seville on 4 July 1969 and later Algeciras when he was appointed OBE. On retirement from diplomatic service he joined a shipping company.

Fernandez was parachuted at Seyne les Alpes above Barcelonnette. His war surname was then Rodolphe. He was picked up by French partisans and met Charlotte Franquebalme. She was their link and would bring up through the mountains food and material to the resistance. Franquebalme and Fernandez had a civil wedding in July 1945 in Marseilles and left for England by boat. A priest happened to be on the same journey and proceeded to a religious wedding. Franquebalme had three children with him. They divorced in 1957 and although Franquebalme came back to France, Fernandez did see his children and made them travel throughout the world as he had entered the diplomatic service. In 1963, Fernandez married Elizabeth Covington who had two children from a previous union.

== Honours and awards ==
Fernandez was awarded the Military Medal in 1944 and the Croix de Guerre in 1946, and was appointed OBE in 1972.
