= Leo Marks =

British cryptographer and writer (1920–2001)

Leo Marks MBE
- Marks at the opening of the Violette Szabo Museum, 2000
- Born: Leopold Samuel Marks; 24 September 1920; London, England
- Died: 15 January 2001 (aged 80); London, England
- Occupations: Cryptographer; writer; poet
- Known for: The Life That I Have; Peeping Tom; Between Silk and Cyanide
- Spouse: Elena Gaussen (m. 1966–2000)
- Military career
- Allegiance: United Kingdom
- Branch: British Army

Leopold Samuel Marks (24 September 1920 – 15 January 2001) was an English writer, screenwriter, and cryptographer. During the Second World War he headed the codes office supporting resistance agents in occupied Europe for the secret Special Operations Executive organisation. After the war, Marks became a playwright and screenwriter, writing scripts that frequently utilised his war-time cryptographic experiences. He wrote the script for Peeping Tom, the controversial film directed by Michael Powell that had a disastrous effect on Powell's career, but was later described by Martin Scorsese as a masterpiece. In 1998, towards the end of his life, Marks published a personal history of his experiences during the war, Between Silk and Cyanide, which was critical of the leadership of SOE.

== Early life ==
Marks was born into a devout Jewish family. He was the son of Benjamin Marks, the joint owner of Marks & Co, an antiquarian bookseller in Charing Cross Road, London. He was introduced at an early age to cryptography when his father showed him Edgar Allan Poe's story, "The Gold-Bug".

From this early interest, he demonstrated his skill at codebreaking by deciphering the secret price codes that his father wrote inside the covers of books. The bookshop subsequently became famous as a result of the book 84, Charing Cross Road, which was based on correspondence between American writer Helene Hanff and the shop's chief buyer, Frank Doel.

== Work in cryptography ==
Marks was conscripted into the British Army in January 1942 and trained as a cryptographer; apparently he demonstrated the ability to complete one week's work in decipherment exercise in a few hours. Unlike the rest of his intake, who were sent to the main British codebreaking centre at Bletchley Park, Marks was regarded as a misfit and he was assigned to the newly formed Special Operations Executive (SOE) in Baker Street, which was set up to train agents to operate behind enemy lines and to assist local resistance groups in occupied Europe. SOE has been described as "a mixture of brilliant brains and bungling amateurs". Marks wrote that he had an inauspicious arrival at SOE when it took him all day to decipher a code he had been expected to finish in 20 minutes, because, not atypically, SOE had forgotten to supply the cipher key, and he had to break the code which SOE had regarded as secure.

Marks briefed many Allied agents sent into occupied Europe, including Noor Inayat Khan, the Grouse/Swallow team of four Norwegian Telemark saboteurs and his own close friend 'Tommy' Yeo-Thomas, nicknamed "the White Rabbit." In an interview which accompanied the DVD of the film Peeping Tom, Marks quoted General Eisenhower as saying that his group's work shortened the war by three months, saving countless lives.

Marks was portrayed by Anton Lesser in David Morley's BBC Radio drama A Cold Supper Behind Harrods. The fictional play was inspired by conversations between Marks and David Morley and real events in SOE. It featured David Jason, and Stephanie Cole as Vera Atkins.

=== Developments of cryptographic practice ===
One of Marks's first challenges was to phase out double transposition ciphers using keys based on poems. These poem ciphers had the limited advantage of being easy to memorise, but significant disadvantages, including limited cryptographic security, substantial minimum message sizes (short ones were easy to crack), and the fact that the method's complexity caused encoding errors. Cryptographic security was enhanced by Marks's innovations, especially "worked-out keys." He was credited with inventing the letter one-time pad, but while he did independently discover the method, he later found it already in use at Bletchley.

=== Preference for original code poems ===
While attempting to relegate poem codes to emergency use, he enhanced their security by promoting the use of original poems in preference to widely known ones, forcing a cryptanalyst to work it out the hard way for each message instead of guessing an agent's entire set of keys after breaking the key to a single message (or possibly just part of the key.) Marks wrote many poems later used by agents, the most famous being one he gave to the agent Violette Szabo, The Life That I Have, which gained popularity when it was used in the 1958 film about her, Carve Her Name With Pride. According to his book, Marks wrote the poem in Christmas 1943 about a girlfriend, Ruth, who had recently died in an air crash in Canada; supposedly the god-daughter of the head of SOE, Sir Charles Jocelyn Hambro.

The life that I have
Is all that I have
And the life that I have
Is yours.

The love that I have
Of the life that I have
Is yours and yours and yours.

A sleep I shall have
A rest I shall have
Yet death will be but a pause.

For the peace of my years
In the long green grass
Will be yours and yours and yours.

=== Gestapo activities and "Indecipherables" ===
Gestapo signal tracers endangered clandestine radio operators, and their life expectancy in occupied France averaged about six weeks. Therefore, short and less frequent transmissions from the codemaster were of value. The pressure could cause agents to make mistakes encoding messages, and the practice was for the home station to tell them to recode it (usually a safe activity) and retransmit it (dangerous, and increasingly so the longer it took). In response to this problem, Marks established, staffed and trained a group based at Grendon Underwood, Buckinghamshire to cryptanalyse garbled messages ("indecipherables") so they could be dealt with in England without forcing the agent to risk retransmitting from the field. Other innovations of his simplified encoding in the field, which reduced errors and made shorter messages possible, both of which reduced transmission time.

=== "Das Englandspiel" in the Netherlands ===
The Germans generally did not execute captured radio operators out of hand. The goal was to turn and use them, or to extract enough information to imitate them. For the safety of entire underground "circuits", it was important to determine if an operator was genuine and still free, but means of independently checking were primitive. Marks claims that he became convinced (but was unable to prove) that their agents in the Netherlands had been compromised by the German counter-intelligence Abwehr. The Germans referred to their operation as "a game"—Das Englandspiel. Marks's warnings fell on deaf ears and perhaps as many as 50 further agents were sent to meet their deaths in Holland. The other side of this story was published in 1953 by Marks's German opposite number in the Netherlands, Hermann Giskes, in his book London Calling North Pole.

=== Reporting to Brigadier Gubbins ===
In his book (pp. 222–3), Marks describes the memorandum he wrote detailing his conviction that messages from the Netherlands were being sent either by Germans or by agents who had been turned. He argued that, despite harrowing circumstances, "not a single Dutch agent has been so overwrought that he's made a mistake in his coding...." Marks had to face Brigadier (later Sir) Colin Gubbins:

Described by Tommy [Marks' closest friend] as 'a real Highland toughie, bloody brilliant, should be the next CD', he was short enough to make me feel average, with a moustache which was as clipped as his delivery and eyes which didn't mirror his soul or any other such trivia. The general's eyes reflected the crossed swords on his shoulders, warning all comers not to cross them with him. It was a shock to realize they were focused on me.

Gubbins grills Marks. In particular he wants to know who has seen this report, who typed it (Marks did):

There was a warning gleam in those forbidding eyes. 'What did you tell Colonel Tiltman about the Dutch situation?'

'Nothing, sir, I was instructed not to discuss the country sections.'
'And you always obey your instructions?'
'No, sir. But in this instance I did.'

There was silence as Celt met Jew on the frontier of instinct. We then went our separate ways.

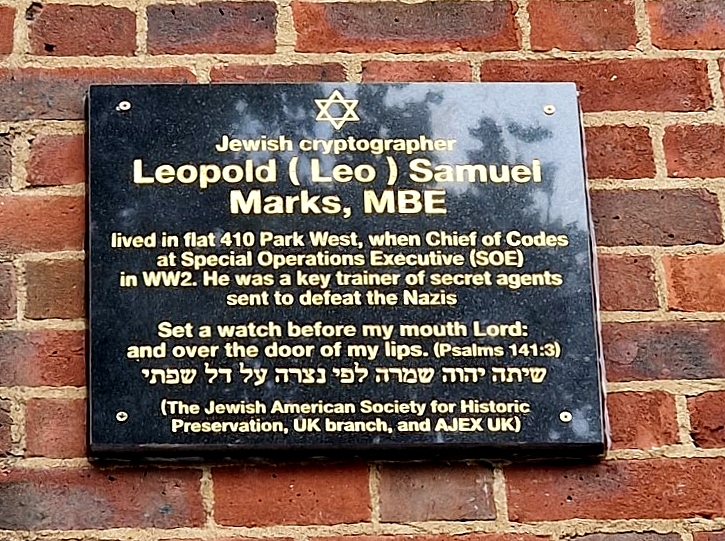
Leopold (Leo) Samuel Marks Historical Marker

== Later life ==
After the war, Marks went on to write plays and films, including The Girl Who Couldn't Quite! (1947), Cloudburst (1951), The Best Damn Lie (1957), Guns at Batasi (co-writer) (1964), Sebastian (1968), and Twisted Nerve (1968).

Marks wrote the script for Michael Powell's film Peeping Tom (1960), the story of a serial killer who films his victims while stabbing them. The film provoked critical revulsion at the time, and was described as "evil and pornographic." The film was critically rehabilitated when younger directors, including Martin Scorsese, expressed admiration for it and for Marks's script. Scorsese subsequently asked Marks to supply the voice of Satan in his 1988 film The Last Temptation of Christ.

Marks and his wife Elena feature prominently in Hanff's 1973 book The Duchess of Bloomsbury Street, her memoir of her trip to England in 1971 in the wake of the success of 84, Charing Cross Road.

In 1998, Marks published his account of his work in SOE – Between Silk and Cyanide: A Codemaker's Story 1941–1945. The book was written in the early 1980s, but didn't receive UK Government approval for publication until 1998. Three of the poems published in the book were scrambled into the song "Dead Agents" by John Cale performed at the Institute of Contemporary Arts, London, in April 1999.

== Personal life and death ==
Marks described himself as an agnostic in Between Silk and Cyanide, but frequently referred to his Jewish heritage.

Marks married Elena Gaussen (born 1938) in 1966. She is a portrait artist noted for the silkscreen Dinner, Chelsea Arts Club, and the oil on canvas Russell Square, 1985 She studied at Southern College of Art, Portsmouth; Royal Academy Schools; and Camberwell School of Arts and Crafts. From 1973–9 she was head of the art department at Queen's College. They were married 1966 to 2000. The marriage lasted until shortly before his death at home from cancer in January 2001.

== Works ==
- Leo Marks (1998). Between Silk and Cyanide: A Codemaker's Story 1941-1945. London: HarperCollins. ISBN 0-00-255944-7.
- Leo Marks (1999). The Life That I Have. illus. by Elena Gaussen Marks. London: Souvenir. ISBN 0-285-63532-8. A small 34 page book with the text of the poem, illustrated by his wife, Elena Gaussen.

== Sources ==
- Marks, Leo (1998). Between Silk and Cyanide: A Codemaker's Story 1941–1945. HarperCollins. ISBN 0-684-86780-X.
- Ganier-Raymond, Philippe (1968). The Tangled Web. New York City: Warner Books. Originally published in French as Le Réseau Étranglé. One of the central stories in Marks's book, the betrayal of the SOE Dutch network, is told from the Dutch and German points of view.
