= Karen Newman (artist) =

British-born sculptor (born 1951)

- Born: 20 January 1951 (age 75) London, England
- Occupation: Sculptor
- Period: from 1965 onwards
- Genre: Figurative sculpture
- Subject: Portrait sculpture

Website
- karen-newman.com

Karen Newman MRBS (born 20 January 1951) is a British-born sculptor, best known for her bronze bust of Violette Szabo on the Albert Embankment of the River Thames, outside Lambeth Palace in London.

== Career ==
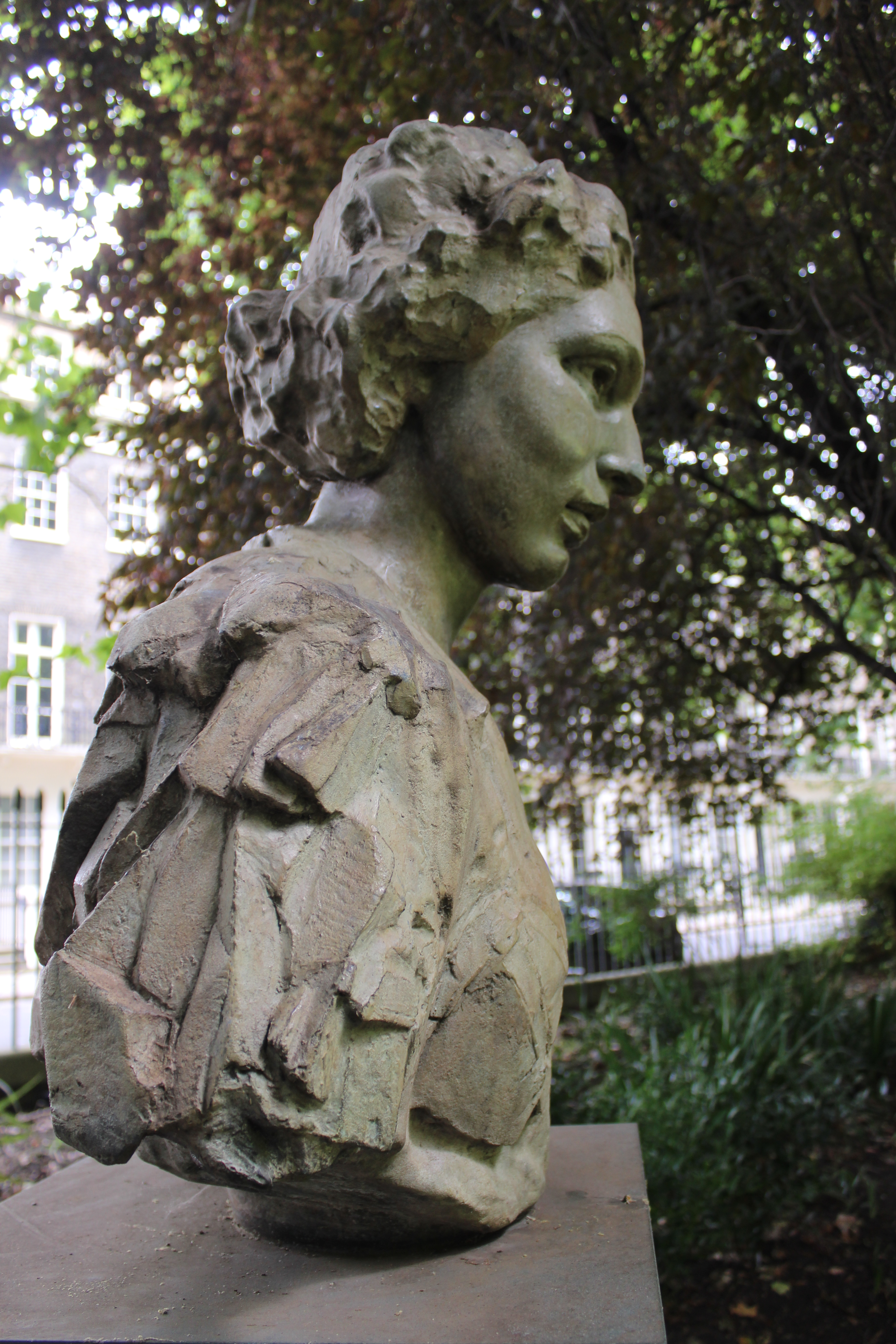
Bust of Noor Inayat Khan by Newman, Gordon Square

Newman was trained at the Chelsea School of Art for a Pre-Diploma 1969–1970, then on to the City and Guilds Art School in Kennington, London 1970–1972. From 1980 to 2001 Newman worked at Madame Tussauds in London. Among her subjects were:

- The Duke of Edinburgh
- Charlie Chaplin
- The ex-Prime Minister Harold Wilson
- Sarah, Duchess of York
- Stevie Wonder
- Eric Clapton
- Bob Geldof
- Prime Minister Tony Blair
- The Israeli Prime Minister Yitzak Rabin
- Jeroen Krabbé. Dutch film actor, painter.
- Chancellor Helmut Kohl
- Jean-Paul Gaultier
- Yoko Ono
- Charles Dance
- Hugh Grant
- Billy Connolly

Newman's life-size waxwork of Charlie Chaplin was exhibited at the National Portrait Gallery, London.

In 2008, a bronze bust of Violette Szabo was unveiled at the Albert Embankment of the River Thames, in front of Lambeth Palace. In January 2026 it was announced that Newman would be designing a statue for the Memorial to Elizabeth II in London.
