= The Life That I Have =

Poem by Leo Marks

"The Life That I Have" (sometimes referred to as "Yours") is a short poem written by Leo Marks and used as a poem code in the Second World War.

== The Poem ==
In the war, famous poems were used to encrypt messages. This was, however, found to be insecure because enemy cryptanalysts were able to locate the original from published sources. Marks countered this by using his own written creations. "The Life That I Have" was an original poem composed on Christmas Eve 1943 and was originally written by Marks in memory of his girlfriend Ruth, who had just died in a plane crash in Canada. On 24 March 1944, the poem was issued by Marks to Violette Szabo, a British agent of Special Operations Executive who was eventually captured, tortured and killed by the Nazis.

It was made famous by its inclusion in the 1958 movie about Szabo, Carve Her Name with Pride, where the poem was said to be the creation of Violette's husband Etienne. (Marks allowed it to be used under the condition that its author not be identified.)

The text of the poem:

The life that I have
Is all that I have
And the life that I have
Is yours.

The love that I have
Of the life that I have
Is yours and yours and yours.

A sleep I shall have
A rest I shall have
Yet death will be but a pause.

For the peace of my years
In the long green grass
Will be yours and yours and yours.

== In popular culture ==
Actor Virginia McKenna, who had played Violette Szabo in Carve Her Name With Pride, released a record in 1974 where she recited the poem set to music.

Actor Michael Hordern recited the poem and told the story behind it during his 1980 appearance on the BBC Radio 4 series With Great Pleasure.

The line "The life I have is all I have / The life I have is yours" appears in the song "Black Death Ambulance" by British rock band Prolapse. The song also contains various lines from Sylvia Plath's poem Lady Lazarus".

The poem was recited at Chelsea Clinton's 2010 wedding to Marc Mezvinsky.

The poem was read at the very end of the funeral of Jane Birkin on 24 July 2023 at Église Saint-Roch (in Paris) by her friend Ms Gabrielle Crawford.

== Bibliography ==
- Leo Marks (1998). Between Silk and Cyanide. London: HarperCollins. ISBN 0-00-255944-7. Marks relates his briefing of Violette Szabo prior to her first mission, and his giving the poem to her in Chapter 65 of this book.
- Leo Marks (1999). The Life That I Have. illus. by Elena Gaussen Marks. London: Souvenir. ISBN 0-285-63532-8. A small 34 page book with the text of the poem, illustrated by his wife.
