= Trix Terwindt =

Dutch intelligence agent and flight attendant (1911–1987)

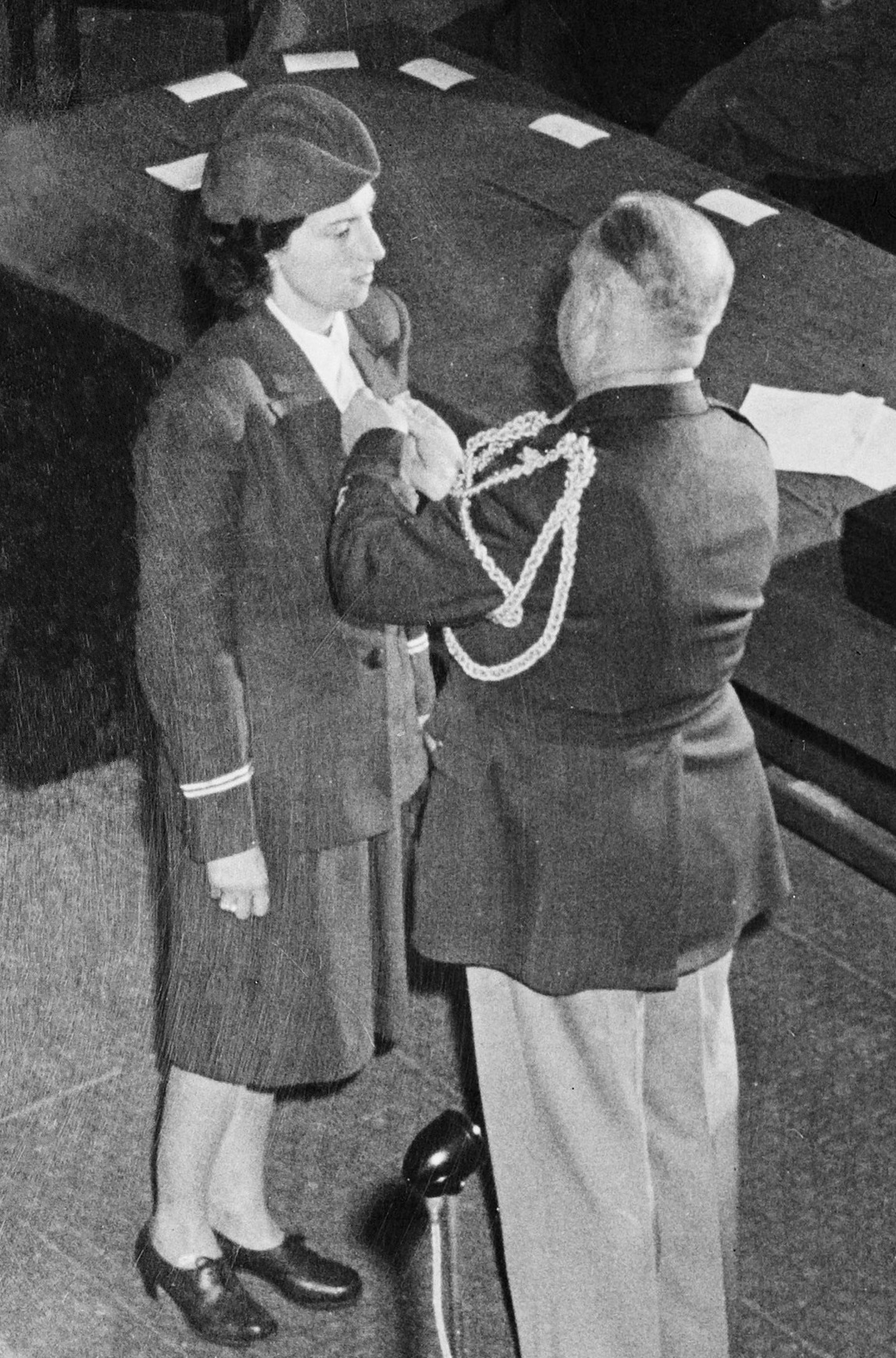
- Trix Terwindt receiving the Medal of Freedom
- Born: 27 February 1911; Arnhem, Netherlands
- Died: 7 April 1987 (aged 76); Oegstgeest, Netherlands
- Citizenship: Dutch
- Years active: 1940 – 1945
- Organization: MI9
- Known for: Dutch Resistance
- Parent(s): Constant Terwindt (Father); Albertina de Muelenaere (Mother)

Beatrice Wilhelmina Marie Albertina (Trix) Terwindt (27 February 1911 – 7 April 1987) was a member of the Dutch resistance during World War II. After escaping from the German-occupied Netherlands, she became an agent of the British MI9 organization. Parachuting back into the Netherlands in February 1943 she was captured by the Germans on her arrival. She was a victim of Englandspiel, the successful counter-intelligence operation of the Germans. She spent the remainder of the war as a prisoner in Ravensbrück and Mauthausen concentration camps. Prior to the war she was one of the first flight attendants of KLM airline and after the war she again became a flight attendant for KLM.

Terwindt suffered from mental and physical problems as a result of her two years imprisonment in concentration camps and was a long-term advocate for treatment of former prisoners for survivor syndrome.

== Early life ==
Trix Terwindt was the daughter of Constant Terwindt and Albertina de Muelenaere. She was the youngest of seven children and grew up in a strict Catholic and wealthy family. Her father was a brick manufacturer and her mother came from a noble, French-speaking Belgian family. Terwindt completed secondary school as an external (live-at-home) student at the Sacré-Coeur boarding school in Arnhem. She was interested in music and art. In 1935 she got a job in an art gallery in Maastricht, but she couldn't make a living at that job. In early 1937 she was admitted to a training course for flight attendants. She was a member of the first group of flight attendants in the Netherlands. At the end of August 1939, Terwindt worked on the last KLM flight to Germany before the outbreak of World War II.

== World War II ==
With the invasion and occupation by the Germans in World War II, Terwindt worked in The Hague, assisting refugees from the bombing of Rotterdam. On 20 February 1942, she fled the Netherlands. She was assisted by several Catholic priests and made her way illegally to Switzerland with no travel papers. The Swiss put her in jail, but released her on 30 April. From Switzerland she traveled to neutral Spain and Portugal. She was recruited to work for MI9 by Donald Darling, MI9's representative in the Iberian Peninsula, who arranged for her to fly to England. MI9, the British Directorate of Military Intelligence Section 9, had the task of helping Allied military personnel, especially downed airmen, evade capture after they were shot down or trapped behind enemy lines in Axis-occupied countries, especially those occupied by Germany. Downed airmen were usually guided through German-occupied countries to Spain, a highly dangerous clandestine activity arranged by escape and evasion lines. If captured the airmen were put in prisoner of war camps; their guides and "helpers," often young Belgian and French women, were imprisoned in concentration camps and sometimes executed.

MI9 was giving financial assistance to escape lines in France and Belgium, but the Netherlands had no organized escape lines to aid downed airmen. Airey Neave of MI9 recruited Terwindt to establish a line in Netherlands which would help downed airmen reach Brussels, Belgium from where the Comet escape line would guide the airmen reach Spain. Neave sent Terwindt for training to the Special Operations Executive (SOE) which was infiltrating agents and saboteurs into the Netherlands. Her job in the Netherlands would be to create and manage an escape line for airmen. She would work by herself, although Neave gave her a few names of contacts and from her previous experience she knew many people in the country. Terwindt was one of only two female agents infiltrated into Europe by MI9, the other being Mary Lindell.

What was unknown to the British was that the German-occupiers had captured more than 50 SOE agents sent to the Netherlands and were playing a game of deception and misinformation called the Englandspiel with captured SOE radios. Terwindt parachuted into the Netherlands on the night of 13/14 February 1943. The Germans were aware of her arrival and, masquerading as her Dutch reception committee, met her on arrival and took her captive. Four months later MI9 learned of her capture.

=== Imprisonment ===
During her initial interrogation, Terwindt was deprived of sleep for three days. She later told Neave that she played a game of "cat and mouse" with the Germans, revealing nothing of her mission or her contacts. After her interrogation, she was imprisoned for three months in Haaren, North Brabant where she was treated well. She would later testify to that fact at war crimes trials in the Netherlands.

However, she was transferred to Ravensbrück concentration camp for women as a Nacht und Nebel prisoner to be treated with more than ordinary severity. She was transferred to Mauthausen in January 1945. In May 1945, just prior to the German surrender, she was released to the Red Cross and taken to Switzerland for medical treatment. It took six weeks for her to recover the physical strength to stand. Her physical and mental health was impacted permanently by the deprivations she suffered during two years in the concentration camps. Of 59 Dutch agents captured and imprisoned by the Germans she was only one of five who survived the war.

== Later life ==
Terwindt went back to work as chief stewardess for KLM, but left the job in 1949 because of ill health. In 1950, she emigrated to Canada to begin a chicken farm but returned to the Netherlands a year later. She met a former KLM pilot named Johannes Bernardus Scholte and the couple moved to Mallorca in 1953. They never married as his wife refused to divorce him. For health reasons, Terwindt returned to the Netherlands in 1963. Scholte died in 1968. After his death, she had a mental disorder and was treated by Jan Bastiaans, a specialist in survivor syndrome whose controversial treatments included LSD. Her second partner, Kornelis Gabriel Bai, died in 1978.

Terwindt was an advocate for Bastiaans' treatments and for recognition of the health problems of concentration camp survivors. She died in 1987.

== Awards ==
For her resistance and espionage work, Terwindt received the Netherlands Cross of Merit, the Bronze Cross and the American Medal of Freedom.
