= Carve Her Name with Pride =

1958 British film by Lewis Gilbert

- Original film poster
- Directed by: Lewis Gilbert
- Written by: Vernon Harris; Lewis Gilbert
- Based on: Carve Her Name with Pride by R. J. Minney
- Produced by: Daniel M. Angel
- Starring: Virginia McKenna; Paul Scofield
- Cinematography: John Wilcox
- Edited by: John Shirley
- Music by: William Alwyn
- Production company: Keyboard Productions Limited
- Distributed by: Rank Film Distributors
- Release date: 18 February 1958
- Running time: 119 minutes
- Country: United Kingdom
- Languages: English; French; German

Carve Her Name with Pride is a 1958 British war drama film directed by Lewis Gilbert and starring Virginia McKenna and Paul Scofield. It was written by Vernon Harris and Gilbert based on the 1956 book of the same title by R. J. Minney.

The film is based on the true story of Special Operations Executive agent Violette Szabo, GC, who was captured and executed while serving in Nazi-occupied France.

== Plot ==
Violette Bushell is a young woman whose father is English, and whose mother is French, living in London early in the Second World War. She meets French Army officer Etienne Szabo, stationed in the city, and they become engaged to be married. They have a daughter, Tania, but Etienne never sees the child, as he is killed fighting in the North African front; Violette Szabo and her daughter move into her parents' home.

Because of her linguistic skills, the widowed Szabo is recruited as a spy by the Special Operations Executive (SOE) for operations in France. On her first mission, she is teamed with Captain Tony Fraser, a man she had met earlier socially and liked. She arrives by small plane in France, and shares a train compartment to Rouen with curious German soldiers. The French Resistance group Fraser had set up in Rouen has been betrayed. The job of the new arrivals is to contact any survivors and to blow up a major railway viaduct. One Resistance member whom Szabo contacts tells her that another survivor, a garage mechanic, is suspect, but Szabo takes the risk of meeting him anyway. He informs her that only three of 98 group members remain. Nonetheless, she persuades him to try to blow up the viaduct. Szabo is picked up and questioned by the Gestapo. She is released, and meets in Paris with Fraser, who congratulates her: The viaduct was destroyed.

They return to Britain, and Szabo reluctantly agrees to another mission. Once again, she is under Fraser's command, this time in the Limoges region. She sets out with a guide to contact the various Resistance units to coordinate their actions. She and her guide become involved in a firefight with German soldiers. They are outnumbered and they flee. Szabo injures her ankle, and she insists on remaining behind. She runs out of ammunition and is captured.

Though tortured, she defiantly refuses to provide any information. Eventually she is reunited with two other women agents she had befriended during their initial training, Lilian Rolfe and Denise Bloch, in a Nazi prison. As Allied forces advance on Paris, the women are placed on a train for Germany. When the train is bombed by Allied aircraft, the women have a chance to attempt to escape, but Szabo instead fetches water for male prisoners. One of them is Fraser. That night, Szabo and Fraser acknowledge their love for each other.

The men and women are separated. The three women are taken to a concentration camp, where they are executed.

After the war, Tania and her grandparents go to Buckingham Palace, where King George VI gives the child her mother's posthumous George Cross. Afterwards, they meet Fraser.

== Cast ==
- Virginia McKenna as Violette Szabo
- Paul Scofield as Tony Fraser
- Jack Warner as Mr. Charles Bushell, Violette's father
- Denise Grey as Mrs. Reine Bushell, Violette's mother
- Alain Saury as Etienne Szabo
- Maurice Ronet as Jacques
- Anne Leon as Lilian Rolfe
- Sydney Tafler as Potter
- Avice Landone as Vera Atkins, assistant to Colonel Buckmaster
- Nicole Stéphane as Denise Bloch
- Noel Willman as interrogator
- Bill Owen as NCO instructor, who trains Szabo, Rolfe and Bloch
- Billie Whitelaw as Winnie
- William Mervyn as Colonel Maurice Buckmaster
- Michael Goodliffe as coding expert
- André Maranne as garage man
- Harold Lang as Commandant Suhren
- Victor Maddern as Sergeant - Parachute Training Instructor (uncredited)
- Michael Caine as thirsty prisoner on train (uncredited)
- Victor Beaumont as German Colonel (uncredited)
- George Mikell as German officer (uncredited)
- Enid Lorimer as Madame Renaud (uncredited)
- John Moulder-Brown as child (uncredited)
- Miriam Karlin as bus conductress (uncredited)

== Production ==
=== Development ===
The film was based on a biography about Szabo written by R.J. Minney. Lewis Gilbert had previously made a film of a Minney novel, Time Gentlemen, Please! and the two men had remained friends; Minney told Gilbert the story of the book at dinner, and the director read proofs of Minney's novel. He felt it would make a "wonderful movie" and purchased the film rights. Gilbert brought in his usual producer, Daniel Angel, and set up the project at the Rank Organisation, which provided finance.

Rank had Virigina McKenna under contract and insisted Gilbert use her in the lead. Gilbert felt McKenna "really wasn't the right type for it... Ideally, it should have been someone like Diana Dors, who was much rougher, because Violet was a Cockney who had lived in Brixton, a very poor area of London." However Gilbert ultimately felt McKenna "was wonderful in the film."

=== Shooting ===
Filming started 6 July 1957 and took place in Pinewood and on location in France over 16 weeks.

The movie used Odette Hallowes as an adviser. Gilbert said this was "very useful, especially as Odette, having already had a film made about her life, understood a bit about film-making." McKenna said Odette "was living proof of a woman who had suffered enormously — torture, solitary confinement, things which are probably almost impossible for us to imagine coping with. Not many films had been made about women during war so, until that time, women hadn’t had the same opportunity as men to show other dimensions of their nature."

McKenna prepared for the role by learning judo and how to shoot a Sten gun and parachute jumping. "I did quite a lot of research," she said. "It’s one of the films I’m proudest of — not because of what I did, but because it told the story of this extraordinary person who represents so many others whose stories have not been told. The courage of women who work behind enemy lines, the terror they must feel on a day-to-day basis, risking their lives and risking never seeing their families again. All that became a real experience for me which affected me very deeply." She added, "My most treasured source of information and understanding, however, was Odette Hallowes.

Another technical adviser on the movie was Leo Marks, who in real life had written the poem containing the code. The film made Marks's poem enormously popular.

McKenna called Carve Her Name with Pride "a film of huge emotions, demanding total commitment to the real people we were interpreting. Often I couldn't ‘cut off' at the end of the day’s filming. But, thank heaven, we had the most sensitive, honest and discriminating of directors, Lewis Gilbert."

Don Sharp directed second unit.

== Reception ==
=== Box office ===
In April 1958 Kinematograph Weekly reported " It’s a war film, but by approaching its subject from the distaff side, it’s opened its doors to both sexes, and they're crowding in."

According to Variety film was one of the twelve most popular at the British box office in 1958.

Kinematograph Weekly listed it as being "in the money" at the British box office in 1958. Gilbert said the film "did quite well in America as well".

=== Critical ===
Variety called it "a dignified and absorbing pic."

Kinematograph Weekly praised the "powerful true-life adventure story, superb portrayal by Virginia McKenna, first-rate supporting cast, clever direction"

Filmink called it "an excellent true-life tale... anchored by superb work from Virginia McKenna, Rank’s only female success story of the late ‘50s. Arguably this was as much a woman’s picture as a war movie, since more than half the running time is dedicated to Szabo’s domestic life: this makes what happens at the end even more thrilling and heart wrenching."

== Award nominations ==
- BAFTA Award for Best Actress – Virginia McKenna

== The real Violette Szabo ==
With her blonde hair and handsome angular features, Virginia McKenna bears no resemblance to the real Violette Szabo, a brunette with dark eyes standing at less than 5 ft. 5 in. tall. McKenna gives Szabo a marked south London accent brushed with received pronunciation, her performance being in the tradition of the "stiff upper lipped" strictly class-structured heroine that would be anticipated by audiences in the atmosphere of a pre-Bond 1950s Britain. The film itself, released in 1958, does not show the full horror of Szabo's treatment in captivity, especially in Ravensbrück concentration camp, or the true manner of her execution, but it gives a broad impression of her bravery and fortitude.

Szabo was described in the citation to her posthumous George Cross as having shown a "magnificent example of courage and steadfastness", by her daughter, Tania, in the title of her 2007 book about her mother's missions, as "young, brave, and beautiful", and by fellow SOE agent, Odette Sansom, GC, who survived Ravensbrück, as "the bravest of us all".

Denise Bloch and Lilian Rolfe were fellow SOE agents, and were executed with Violette Szabo on 5 February 1945 in Ravensbrück. Colonel Maurice Buckmaster was head of SOE F Section; Vera Atkins was his assistant and the section's intelligence officer, with special responsibility for female agents.

Vera Atkins, Odette Sansom, and Leslie Fernandez, one of Szabo's SOE instructors and a field agent himself, were advisors on the film.

The role played by Paul Scofield, Tony Fraser, was created for dramatic purposes, but is based upon Szabo's actual male colleague on her missions to France, and organiser of the Salesman circuit, Philippe Liewer ('Major Charles Staunton').

== "The Life That I Have" ==
The poem, "The Life That I Have", also known as "Yours", recited to Violette by her husband Etienne, was once believed to have been written especially for the film, but was in fact the actual code poem given to her in March 1944 by the SOE cryptographer Leo Marks, and written by him on Christmas Eve 1943 in memory of his girlfriend, Ruth, who had recently died in a plane crash. Marks, who became a scriptwriter after the war, would only let the poem be used on condition that his authorship was not revealed.

== Notes ==
- McFarlane, Brian (1997). An autobiography of British cinema : as told by the filmmakers and actors who made it. Methuen.
- McKenna, Virginia (2010). The life in my years. Oberon.
