= Memorial to Elizabeth II, London =

Project in London, England

Elizabeth II memorial
- Interactive map of Elizabeth II memorial
- Location: St James's Park
- Coordinates: 51°30′09″N 0°08′07″W
- Designer: Foster + Partners
- Type: Memorial
- Dedicated to: Elizabeth II; Prince Philip, Duke of Edinburgh

A planned memorial to Queen Elizabeth II is to be built in St James's Park in central London. As of 2026, it is still in the planning phase with no scheduled completion date.

== Background ==
Queen Elizabeth II died in September 2022. Plans for the memorial were announced in September 2024, shortly before the second anniversary of her death.

It will involve statues of the Queen and Prince Philip, Duke of Edinburgh at Marlborough Gate overlooking The Mall, both by Martin Jennings. There will also be a smaller sculpture of the Queen by Karen Newman on Birdcage Walk.

The location has been chosen for its proximity to Buckingham Palace and The Mall and to facilitate the large numbers of visitors and tourists that the area is associated with.

A contest for the statue design was launched in late 2024. The shortlist of design teams for the memorial was announced in February 2025. The design team led by Foster + Partners was announced as the winner on 24 June 2025. The final design was announced in the spring of 2026 to coincide with the centenary of Elizabeth's birth.

== Design ==
The shortlisted design teams for the memorial were:

- Foster + Partners with Yinka Shonibare and Michel Desvigne Paysagiste
- Heatherwick Studio with Halima Cassell, MRG Studio, Webb Yates and Arup
- J&L Gibbons with Michael Levine RDI, William Matthews Associates, Structure Workshop and Arup
- Tom Stuart-Smith with Jamie Fobert Architects, Adam Lowe (Factum Arte) and Structure Workshop
- WilkinsonEyre with Lisa Vandy and Fiona Clark, Andy Sturgeon Design, Atelier One and Hilson Moran

The Foster + Partners team was announced as the winner on 24 June 2025. A translucent cast-glass bridge, inspired by the Queen's wedding tiara, the Queen Mary Fringe Tiara, will replace the existing Blue Bridge. Statues of the Queen and Prince Philip will stand in a new civic space named Queen Elizabeth II Place at Marlborough Gate. A separate statue of the Queen will be located on Birdcage Walk. Other features will include a wind sculpture by Yinka Shonibare, a Commonwealth compass by Norman Foster, a "communities of the UK" garden, Commonwealth garden, and a Prince Philip Gate garden.

Martin Jennings was announced as the designer for the Queen's statue overlooking The Mall in September 2025. Although initial illustrations of the statue had shown the Queen on a horse, in January 2026 Jennings confirmed she would be standing, later revealing that she would be depicted in the robes of the Order of the Garter, using the painting by Pietro Annigoni as a reference. Prince Philip will be depicted wearing the uniform of the Admiral of the Fleet. At the same time Karen Newman was announced as designer for the smaller statue on Birdcage Walk.
