= Lilian Rolfe =

French espionage agent

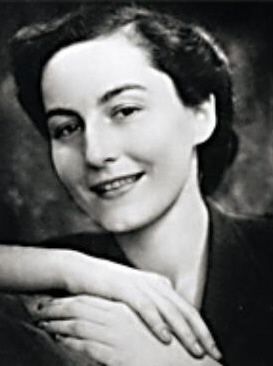
- Lilian Rolfe
- Born: 26 April 1914; Paris, France
- Died: 5 February 1945 (aged 30); Ravensbrück concentration camp, Germany
- Military career
- Allegiance: United Kingdom
- Branch: Women's Auxiliary Air Force; Special Operations Executive; First Aid Nursing Yeomanry
- Service years: 1943–1945
- Rank: Ensign
- Nickname: Nadine
- Units: Historian
- Conflicts: Second World War
- Awards: Member of the Order of the British Empire; Mentioned in dispatches Croix de Guerre (France)

Lilian Vera Rolfe (26 April 1914 – 5 February 1945), code name Nadine, was an agent of the United Kingdom's clandestine Special Operations Executive (SOE) organisation in France during World War II. The purpose of SOE was to conduct espionage, sabotage and reconnaissance in occupied Europe against the Axis powers, especially Nazi Germany. SOE agents in France allied themselves with French Resistance groups and supplied them with weapons and equipment parachuted in from England.

Rolfe was a wireless operator for the Historian Network based in Orleans. After four months of work in France, she was captured by the Germans on 31 July 1944. She was executed in Ravensbrück concentration camp in late January 1945.

== Early life ==
Rolfe and her twin sister Helen Fedora Rolfe were the daughters of George Rolfe, a British accountant working in Paris, and a Russian mother, who was Jewish, and so Lilian was halachically Jewish. Although she grew up in Paris, Rolfe came to England for a summer in Britain to learn English, but became ill with rheumatic fever. In 1933, when she was nineteen, the family moved to Rio de Janeiro, Brazil. Rolfe was working in the press section of the British Embassy when World War II began in 1939. Part of her job was monitoring German ship movements in and out of Rio. In February 1943, Rolfe left Brazil and her family behind to join the war effort in England. Her ship was badly damaged, probably by a German mine, in the ocean crossing. In England she joined the WAAF on 16 May 1943. Her facility with languages brought her to the attention of the SOE and she joined the organization on 24 November 1943. SOE trained her as a wireless operator. She was unhappy during her training because of a failed romance.

== France ==
On 5 April 1944, Rolfe was dropped off by Westland Lysander airplane at a clandestine airfield near the village of Azay-sur-Cher (near Tours) in German occupied France. Strapped around her waist was a wireless which weighed only 4 kg (8.8 lb) including its carrying case, a vast improvement over the cumbersome B-2 wireless weighing 15 kg (33 lb) used by previous SOE agents. Rolfe was assigned to work in the Historian network (or circuit) headed by George Alfred "Teddy" Wilkinson and based in the city of Orleans. At the time of her arrival, SOE was infiltrating numerous agents, especially wireless operators, into France in preparation of the Allied invasion of France, (D-day), which would take place on 6 June 1944.

In accordance with SOE doctrine to minimize contact with other agents, Rolfe did not meet with Wilkinson until 2 June. In the meantime, she met and worked with the local French resistance organization, the Maquis, sought out landing sites for clandestine aircraft and parachute drops of supplies, and established safe houses. She sent a total of 67 wireless messages to SOE headquarters in London enabling the SOE to air drop supplies and arms for the Maquis in preparation for their role in hindering the German response to the D-day landings. She moved from place to place and between transmissions hid her radio in various locations. She was involved in a skirmish between the Germans and the Maquis near Olivet.

== Capture and execution ==
In late June, Wilkinson was captured (and later executed) by the Germans. Rolfe continued working under a local leader named Pierre Charié. However, on 31 July the retreating Germans swept the town of Nangis to arrest suspected resisters. In one house they anticipated finding a resister, but instead they found Rolfe, an unexpected treasure, a SOE wireless operator. Her documents were suspicious and they soon found her radio.

Rolfe was interrogated at SD headquarters at 84 Avenue Foch in Paris and imprisoned at Fresnes Prison. On 8 August 1944, with the allies advancing on Paris, Rolfe and other captured SOE agents were sent by train to Germany. In late August she reached Ravensbrück concentration camp for women. Along with SOE agents Violette Szabo and Denise Bloch she volunteered for a work party at Torgau in Saxony, where conditions were better than at Ravensbrūck. They attempted to escape but failed. Sent back to Ravensbrück, they were beaten and put in an underground bunker. On 19 October, they were sent to Königsberg in Brandenburg where they were forced to do heavy labor in winter conditions. Recalled to Ravensbrück in late January 1945, they were in poor health. Rolfe was unable to walk and Bloch was "suffering from gangrene." A few days later they were taken to the courtyard by the crematorium. Camp commandant Fritz Suhren read the order for their execution and they were each shot in the back of the head with a small caliber pistol. Their bodies were cremated. An eyewitness said the women were "very brave" and that Commandant Suhren was annoyed that the Gestapo "did not themselves carry out the execution."

== Honours ==
Some secondary sources describe Rolfe as having been appointed MBE, but no matching appointment notice has been located in The London Gazette, so the claim may be unsubstantiated.

Rolfe's name is engraved on the Runnymede Memorial in Surrey, England. The "Lilian Rolfe House" at the Vincennes Estate, Lambeth was dedicated to her memory. In her honour, the government of France posthumously awarded her the Croix de Guerre. In the town of Montargis in the Loiret département, where she had been active, a street was named for her alias: "Rue Claudie Rolfe". As one of the SOE agents who died for the liberation of France, she is listed on the "Roll of Honour" on the Valençay SOE Memorial in the town of Valençay, in the Indre departément of France. Like many female agents she was seconded into the First Aid Nursing Yeomanry (FANY) when she joined SOE. Thus she is also commemorated on the FANY memorial at St Paul's Church Knightsbridge in London. On 19 August 2021 a plaque was installed on the house Rolfe was born in (32 avenue Duquesne in the 7th arrondissement of Paris) due to the efforts of Barbara Cronk, a member of the Rolfe family.

In the 1958 film Carve Her Name with Pride, the character of Lilian Rolfe was played by Anne Leon.

1939–1945 Star	France and Germany Star	War Medal with Mentioned in dispatches
Croix de Guerre (France)

== Bibliography ==
- Squadron Leader Beryl E. Escott, Mission Improbable: A salute to the RAF women of SOE in wartime France, London, Patrick Stevens Limited, 1991. ISBN 1-85260-289-9
- Liane Jones, A Quiet Courage: Women Agents in the French Resistance, London, Transworld Publishers Ltd, 1990. ISBN 0-593-01663-7
- Marucs Binney, The Women Who Lived for Danger: The Women Agents of SOE in the Second World War, London, Hodder and Stoughton, 2002. ISBN 0-340-81840-9
- Sarah Helm, A Life in Secrets: The Story of Vera Atkins and the Lost Agents of SOE, London, Abacus, 2005 ISBN 978-0-349-11936-6
