= Hortense Clews =

Member of the Belgian Resistance

Hortense Daman Clews
- Born: 12 August 1926; Leuven, Belgium
- Died: 18 December 2006 (aged 80); Newcastle-under-Lyme, England
- Military career
- Allegiance: Belgium
- Branch: Belgian Resistance
- Rank: Courier
- Awards: Croix de Guerre; Order of Leopold II

Hortense Daman-Clews (née Daman; 12 August 1926 – 18 December 2006) was a member of the Belgian Resistance during World War II.

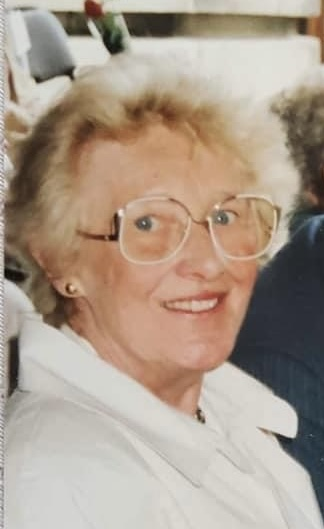
Hortense Clews

== Early years ==
Born as Hortense Daman to parents Jacques and Stephanie Daman in the Belgian town of Leuven (Louvain in Belgium) in 1926 where her mother ran a grocery shop.

== World War II ==
Hortense became involved in the Belgian Resistance when she was 13 after the Nazis had invaded Belgium in 1940.

Her brother François was then 26 and in the Belgian army. When Germany invaded, he was working for the Red Cross as a cover for his work in the Belgian Army of Partisans, part of the larger network of the Belgian Resistance. Hortense began helping her brother François with his work with the Belgian Resistance, helping Allied servicemen evade capture.

Her brother asked Hortense to distribute Belgium's most popular underground newspaper, La libre Belgique.

Hortense mainly worked as a courier, which involved carrying messages, explosives and weapons beneath the upper layer in her cycle pannier while pretending to be carrying out grocery deliveries for her mother. Once during these deliveries, Hortense was stopped by officers doing ID checks. Thankfully, Hortense also had groceries with her, and produced eggs to prove her alibi.

As leaders in the Resistance were being arrested or assassinated, Hortense was assigned to go to a certain residence to collect confidential files. On the train home, however, the Secret Field Police were checking ID papers as well as bags and parcels. Though Hortense was not discovered during this mission, despite riding the train in close quarters with German officers, she would not be so fortunate in the future.

=== Betrayal and arrest ===
On 14 February 1944, the Gestapo raided the family home after someone informed on the family's resistance work. Hortense was arrested along with her parents, and they were taken to a local prison where they suffered interrogation and vicious beatings by the Gestapo and Belgian SS. Hortense was interrogated every day for thirty days. She was sentenced to death without trial and moved to the Ravensbrück concentration camp in Germany with her mother; her father was sent to Buchenwald concentration camp.

=== Concentration camp inmate ===
At Ravensbrück, Hortense was subjected to experiments including infecting her leg with gangrene (the German doctors deciding not to amputate) and attempted sterilisation.

Whilst at Ravensbrück, her life was saved by the actions of British secret agent Violette Szabo, also a prisoner there. Szabo did not survive the war.

== Post-war ==
At the end of the war, Hortense and her mother were taken under the protection of the Swedish Red Cross and reunited with her father and her brother.

In 1946, she met and married Sydney Clews, a staff sergeant in the British Army; they eventually settled in Newcastle-under-Lyme in Staffordshire. Sixteen years later, despite the experiments that had been carried out at Ravensbrück, she gave birth to daughter Julia and, seven years later, son Christopher.

== Legacy ==
Hortense received the top awards of the Belgian government for her service. In 1989, Mark Bles wrote her biography titled Child at War.

== Death ==
Hortense Daman Clews died in Newcastle-under-Lyme, England in 2006, aged 80.

== Sources ==
- Bles, Mark. A Child at War: Hortense Daman; ISBN 978-0-7515-0460-6
