= Englandspiel =

German World War II counter espionage operation

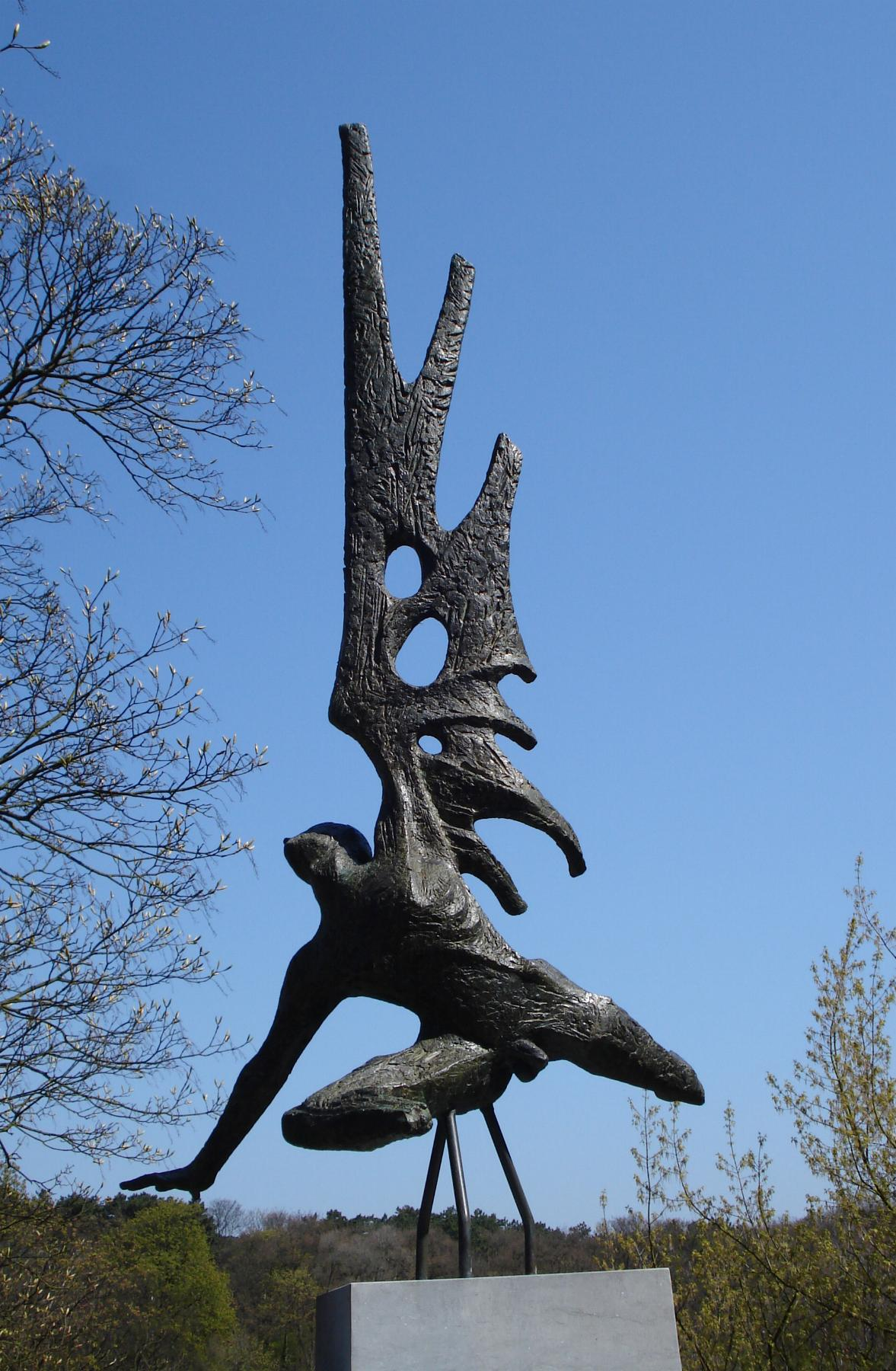
"Englandspiel Monument" or The Fall of Icarus (by Titus Leeser) in The Hague memorializes the 54 agents who were dropped into the Netherlands during Das Englandspiel. The inscription says, in part "They jumped to their death for our freedom."

SOE needed professional intelligence officers at its head, as we had in the Abwehr, and in particular it needed men adept at subversive warfare. Instead they sent us infants, keen and willing, but quite unfitted for that kind of warfare.

— Hermann Giskes, Abwehr, Netherlands

Englandspiel ('England Game'), or Operation North Pole (German: Unternehmen Nordpol), was a successful counterintelligence operation of the Abwehr (German military intelligence) from 1942 to 1944 during World War II. German counter-intelligence operatives, headed by Hermann Giskes of the Abwehr and Joseph Schreider of the Sicherheitsdienst (SD), captured Allied resistance agents operating in the Netherlands and used the agents' radios and codes to dupe the United Kingdom's clandestine organization, the Special Operations Executive (SOE), into continuing to infiltrate agents, weapons, and supplies into the Netherlands. The Germans captured nearly all the agents and weapons sent by the United Kingdom (Britain).

Englandspiel was a "catastrophe" for SOE and the Dutch resistance, "a textbook illustration, the world over, in how not to conduct clandestine work." Fifty-four SOE agents sent from England were captured by the Germans and only four survived. The other fifty were executed or died in concentration camps. The Dutch resistance was substantial in numbers but lacked weapons. If armed, as had been the objective of SOE, it might have played an important role helping the allied military forces in their failed attempt to expel the Germans from the Netherlands in 1944.

== Background ==
The Special Operations Executive (SOE) was created by the United Kingdom on July 22, 1940, in accordance with Prime Minister Winston Churchill's directive to "set Europe ablaze." The objective of the SOE was to undertake "irregular warfare" with sabotage and subversion in countries occupied by Nazi Germany and other Axis powers. SOE agents in occupied countries allied themselves with resistance groups and supplied them with weapons and equipment parachuted in from England. Section N was created within SOE to deal with the Netherlands. Section N had four chiefs during the war: RV Laming, Charles Blizard (known as Blunt), Seymour Bingham, and RI Dobson. In the words of MRD Foot, official historian of the SOE, Section N was "not always noted for efficiency."

The opposite numbers of the SOE leaders in the German-occupied Netherlands were Majors Hermann Giskes of the Abwehr and Joseph Schreieder of the Sicherheitsdienst (SD), the intelligence service of the SS.

The Netherlands presented geographical challenges to the Dutch resistance and the British intelligence agencies wishing to infiltrate agents and supply arms and supplies to the resistance groups. The country was densely populated and lacked forests and mountains where resistance forces could hide; isolated areas suitable for landing aeroplanes or parachute drops of arms and supplies for the resistance were hard to find; the coast was flat and the beaches guarded and often mined by the Germans, offering little opportunity to bring in agents and supplies by boat or submarine. Moreover, the Netherlands did not border any neutral, unoccupied country which could be used as a staging ground for resistance activities.

== Bad beginning ==
Thus began das Englandspiel... an extraordinary two-year Abwehr operation that netted more than fifty London-sent Dutch agents... not to mention hundreds of tons of arms and explosives. The worst disaster in SOE history, it would virtually decapitate the Dutch resistance movement.

— Lynne Olson, author The Last Hope.

In late summer 1941, a Dutch agent of the British intelligence agency MI6 was arrested by the Germans in the Netherlands. He had with him a large number of coded messages, and a German cryptographer, Sergeant E. G. May, learned the MI6 cipher system. In February 1942, two MI6 agents were captured in the Netherlands, which added to the German knowledge of the British codes. At the time, SOE depended upon MI6 for its communications and ciphers.

Meanwhile, SOE was training Dutch agents to infiltrate into the Netherlands to help a fledgling resistance movement. The agents complained about the deficiencies of their training program. They were given clothing easily identifiable as British to be worn in the Netherlands, security was lax and SOE could not provide the agents in training with names and addresses of contacts and safe houses that they would need in the Netherlands. In response, the British confined the disaffected trainees and released them only in December 1941 after a complaint by the Dutch government-in-exile in England, and the agents signed an agreement to remain silent about their complaints.

SOE's first two Dutch agents, wireless operator Huub Lauwers and saboteur Thys Taconis, parachuted into the Netherlands on the night of 6/7 November 1941. Lauwers was captured on 6 March 1942. He was persuaded to send messages to SOE in London, but he omitted from the messages the two security checks (deliberate errors) that were required to be introduced into messages by the sending agent, the scheme for which was known only to the agent and SOE. The presence of security checks in messages indicated that the sender was the legitimate agent and was acting under free will. The absence of security checks represented a vitally-important duress code, which should have warned SOE that the sender was either an impostor or a legitimate agent who had been captured and coerced into working for the Nazis. Repeatedly ignoring the significance of the absent security checks was a serious violation of the SOE's own transmission protocol. However, SOE London ignored the absence of the security checks and accepted the messages as genuine. Lauwers continued to transmit messages without the security checks and even inserted the letters CAU and GHT ("Caught") at the beginning and end of messages. SOE London paid no attention.

The messages that Lauwers transmitted as a prisoner of the Germans included requests that additional agents and supplies be sent to the Netherlands. SOE responded positively. Agents and supplies, including weapons, were usually flown out of Britain at night and dropped by parachute from converted Handley Page Halifax bombers or landed in fields by Westland Lysander STOL aircraft. SOE air operations were based at RAF Tempsford. The agents and supplies were met on arrival and captured by the Germans.

== Playing England ==
Several captured Dutch radio operators continued broadcasting encrypted messages but without security checks, which should have alerted SOE that they had been compromised. SOE's head of codes Leo Marks later claimed to have realised that unlike all other coded messages from agents in other countries, the Dutch messages contained no errors. He reasoned that was because they were coded not in the field by harried and harassed wireless operators but by expert German cryptographers. The Dutch messages were too good to be genuine. In the documentary Churchill's Secret Army, Marks recounts how a wireless operator ended a telegraphic radio communication with "HH", which stood for Heil Hitler and was the usual closing for German communications. The other party instantly replied "HH", which indicated that the transmitter was a German who was used to adding "HH" to messages automatically and not a British agent, who would have been confused by the two letters. Finally, Marks sent a Dutch agent in the Netherlands a deliberately garbled message. Marks reasoned that no ordinary SOE agent could decrypt the message, but the German cryptographers would. The Dutch agent responded to the garbled message, which indicated to Marks that he was transmitting under the control of the Germans. Marks reported the findings to his superior, who told him to not discuss the matter with anybody else; no action was taken.

German wireless operators reported mock resistance groups and sabotage successes to SOE London. When SOE London requested for an agent return to England, he would suddenly meet with a calamity of some sort and so he could not return. In January 1943, Marks wrote a report to SOE leaders about his suspicions that all or nearly all SOE agents in the Netherlands were in German hands, but it was months before any action was taken. Neither the Dutch section, overseeing operations in the Netherlands nor other services were notified of his suspicions. The failure of SOE leadership to respond to signs that the Dutch program was controlled by the Germans was probably motivated by both denial of warning signs and interdepartmental competition between SOE and the rival Secret Intelligence Service ("C") from which SOE had been created.

== End ==
To [the SOE section chiefs] Messrs Blunt, (Note: 'Blunt' refers to a pseudonym used by Major Charles Blizard, Head of N (Dutch) Section SOE.) Bingham (Note: Major Seymour Bingham, his successor as Head of N Section.) and Succs Ltd., London. In the last time you are trying to make business in Netherlands without our assistance stop we think this rather unfair in view of our long and successful co-operation as your sole agents stop but never mind whenever you will come to pay a visit to the Continent you may be assured that you will be received with the same care and result as all those who you sent us before stop so long.

— Hermann Giskes, Abwehr, Netherlands wireless message to SOE headquarters, 1 April 1944

In the fall of 1943, two Dutch SOE agents, Pieter Dourlein and John Ubbink, escaped from Haaren prison, made their way to Switzerland, and reported Englandspiel to the Dutch legation there, which passed the information along to the British government. The two agents then used one of the escape and evasion lines to get to Spain and hence to London. The Abwehr's Giskes, however, anticipated their arrival by sending a fake message, ostensibly from another SOE agent, that Dourlein and Ubbink were turncoats who became German agents. Both were imprisoned on their arrival in London and remained in a British prison until after the Normandy invasion in June 1944. They were later honoured by the Dutch government.

Englandspiel was already on its last legs in the fall of 1943. The Royal Air Force (RAF), which supplied the planes and pilots for SOE, had suspended SOE flights to the Netherlands after May 1943 because of the high casualties to aircraft and airmen. The RAF had noticed that its flights to the Netherlands always arrived without opposition and that landing areas were "too bloody perfect", but planes were fired upon during their return trip to England and suffered unusually-high losses. In less than a year, 12 RAF aircraft were shot down during their return flight from SOE missions in the Netherlands.

The end of Englandspiel came on 1 April 1944, with Giskes sending a taunting message to SOE complaining about the lack of recent business from England given that he had been servicing them for so long. Giskes' message also promised a warm welcome to any further agents SOE wished to insert into the Netherlands.

== Aftermath ==
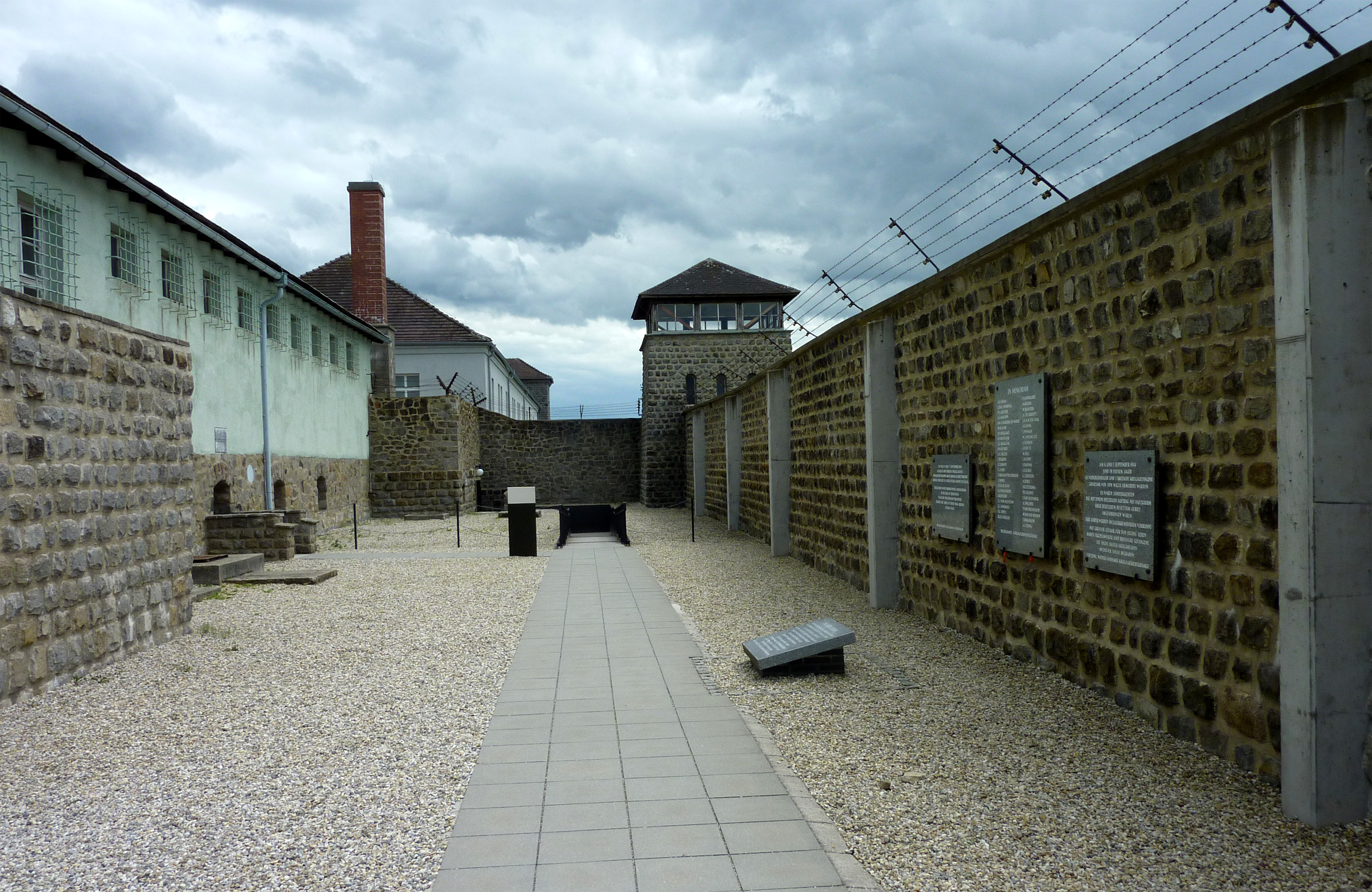
Mauthausen concentration camp, memorial plaques behind the Prison Block marking the spot where the ashes of the executed Englandspiel SOE agents are buried

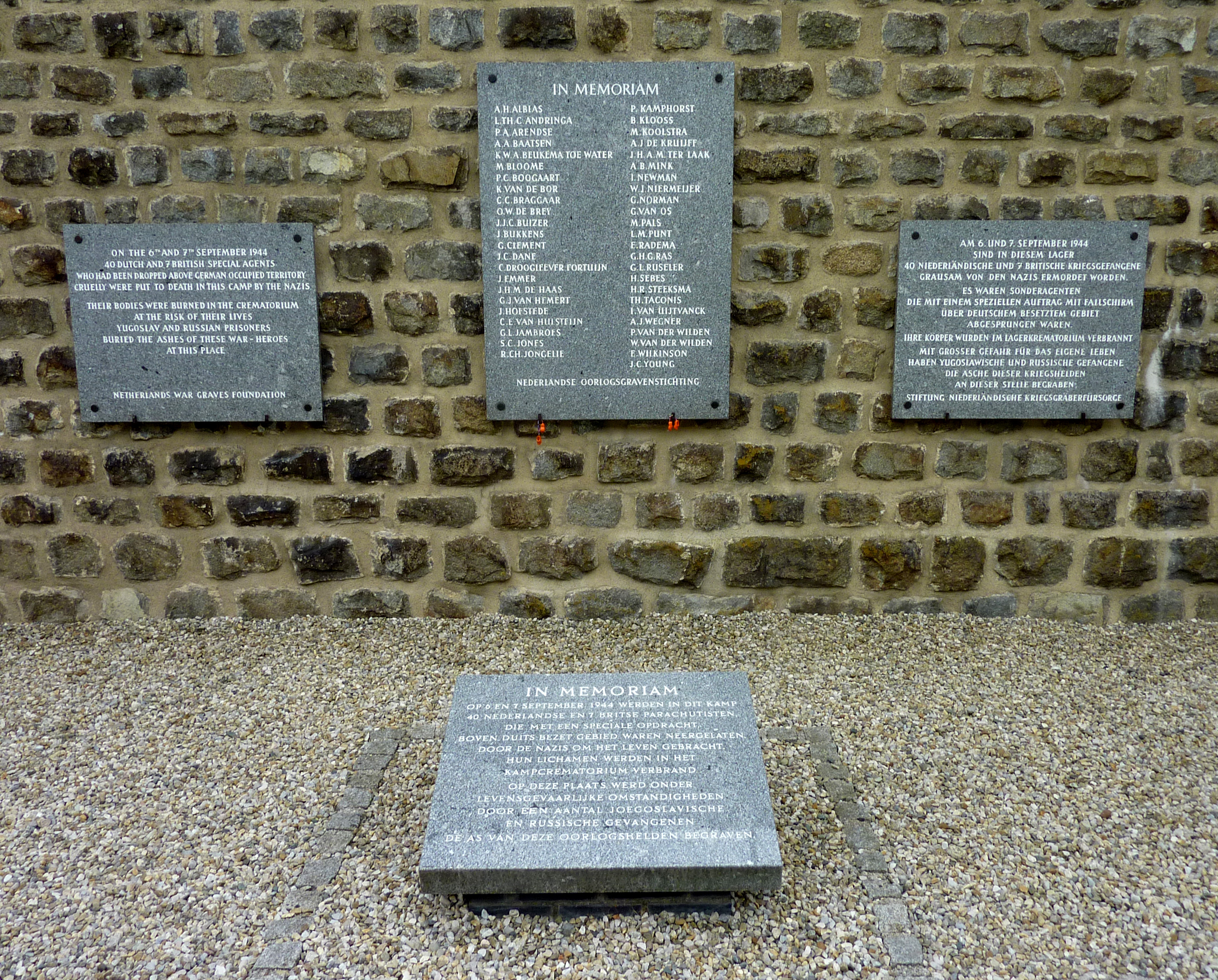
Englandspiel memorial plaques behind the Prison Block of the Mauthausen concentration camp

The fifty Dutch SOE agents that had been captured by the Germans were transported to Mauthausen concentration camp in September 1944 as allied military forces were advancing into the Netherlands, and eventually executed. Giskes, the Abwehr mastermind of Englandspiel, was arrested by the British, but after the war was employed by the United States during the occupation of Germany.

Some of the officials of the Dutch government-in-exile in London refused to cooperate with SOE when the details of Englandspiel became known to them. They were ordered to do so by the Dutch Prince Bernhard, and a fresh start was made in mid-to-late 1944 under new leadership at SOE. Twenty-five well equipped and trained sabotage teams of two Dutch agents each were parachuted into the Netherlands. However, engendered by Englandspiel the British distrusted the Dutch resistance which prevented it from having an impact in Operation Market Garden, the unsuccessful offensive by allied military forces in the Netherlands in September 1944. The spearhead of the British forces, the First British Airborne Division, was ordered not to cooperate with the resistance. Had it not been ignored, the resistance would have been helpful in providing badly needed intelligence and communications to the division which had to be withdrawn from the battlefield after heavy losses.

Conspiracy theories in the Netherlands alleged that a traitor in SOE caused the Englandspiel and that Dutch agents were sacrificed to conceal allied plans for an invasion of the Netherlands. "For many, it was simply impossible to fathom how the devastation caused by das Englandspiel could have been the result of stupidity and ineptness." The contrary and more accepted view of M.R.D Foot is that “the agents were victims of sound police work on the German side, assisted by Anglo-Dutch incompetence in London."

== Agents ==
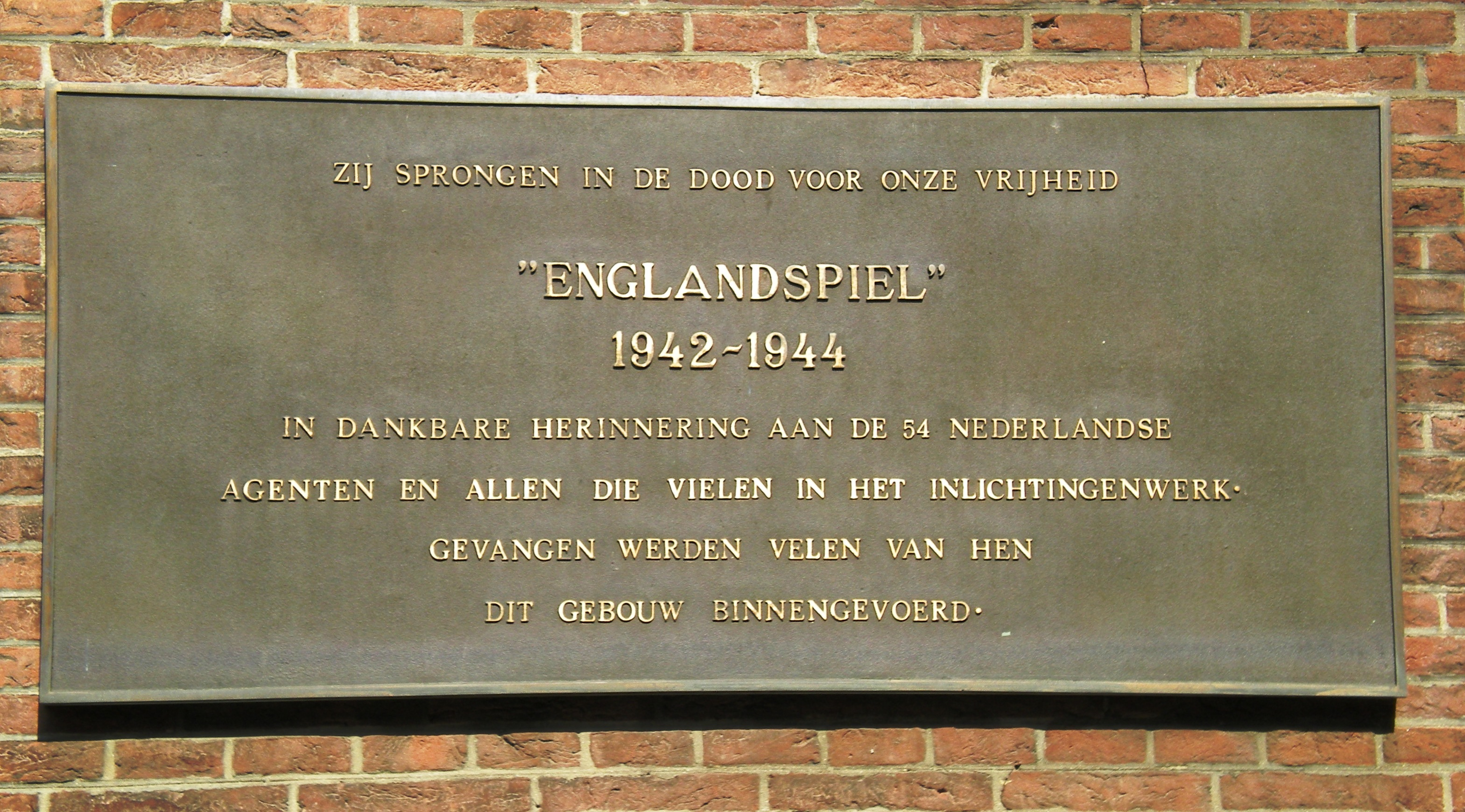
A plaque regarding the Englandspiel on the Binnenhof in The Hague

During the Englandspiel the following agents (amongst others) were dropped in the Netherlands:

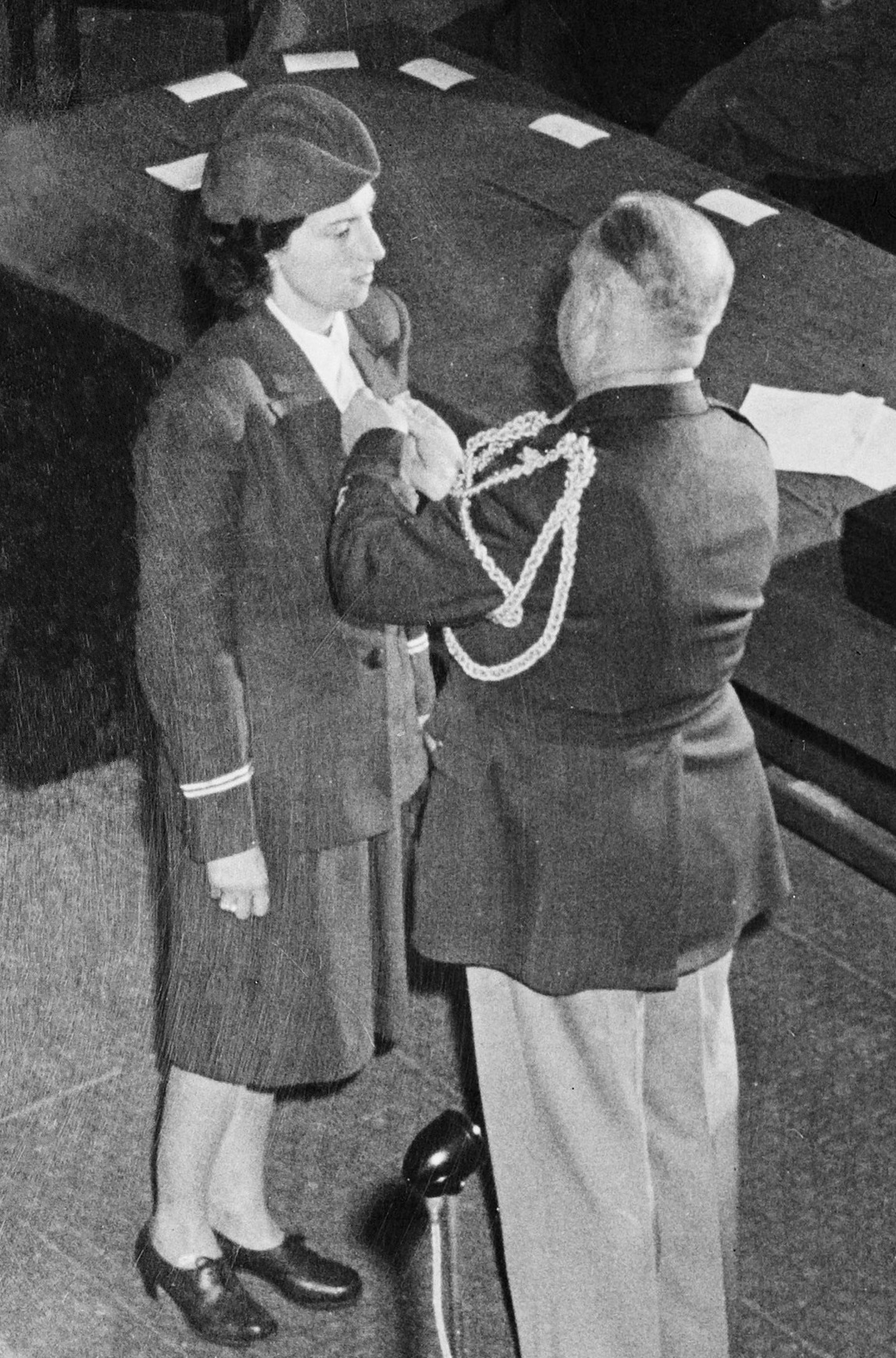
Trix Terwindt, the only woman agent captured by the Germans in Englandspiel and one of the few who survived the war

- 28 August 1940: Lodo van Hamel, sent to Oegstgeest in South Holland.
- 5 July 1941: Aart Alblas, dropped near Nieuweschans in Groningen, arrested 16 July 1942.
- 6 November 1941: Huub Lauwers and Thijs Taconis, dropped near Ommen in Overijssel. Lauwers was arrested on 6 March 1942, Taconis on 9 March 1942.
- 9 December 1941: Wim van der Reijden, sent to Scheveningen, arrested on 13 February 1942.
- 23 February 1942: Evert Radema and E.W. de Jonge, sent to Katwijk aan Zee, Radema was arrested on 29 May 1942, De Jonge on 22 May 1942.
- 28 February 1942: Gerrit Dessing, dropped near Ermelo in Gelderland, returned via Brussels to England on 2 September 1943.
- 27 March 1942: Nol Baatsen, dropped near Kallenkote, east of Steenwijk in Overijssel and immediately arrested
- 29 March 1942: Jan Molenaar and Leo Andringa, dropped near Holten in Overijssel; Molenaar was injured and committed suicide (by pill), Andringa was arrested on 28 April 1942.
- 29 March 1942: Gosse Ras and Han Jordaan, dropped near Holten in Overijssel, Ras was arrested on 1 May 1942, Jordaan two days later.
- 5 April 1942: Henk Sebes and Barend Kloos, dropped near Harskamp, Ede in Gelderland, Sebes was arrested on 8 May 1942, Kloos on 29 April 1942.
- 18 April 1942: Jan de Haas (as a replacement for Molenaar), brought to Castricum, arrested on 28 April 1942.
- 29 May 1942: Herman Parleviet and Toon van Steen, dropped near Kallenkote, east of Steenwijk in Overijssel and arrested immediately.
- 22 June 1942: Jan van Rietschoten and Jo Buizer, dropped near Holten in Overijssel and arrested immediately.
- 26 June 1942: George Jambroes and Jozef Bukkens, dropped near Kallenkote, east of Steenwijk in Overijssel and arrested immediately.
- 23 July 1942: Gerard Jan van Hemert, dropped near Holten in Overijssel and arrested immediately.
- 24 September 1942: Karel Beukema toe Water and Cees Droogleever Fortuyn, dropped near Balloo in Drenthe and arrested immediately.
- 24 September 1942: Mooy and Jongelie, dropped and immediately arrested.
- 1 October 1942: Aart van Giessen, dropped and immediately arrested.
- 21 October 1942: Meindert Koolstra, dropped near Ermelo in Gelderland and arrested immediately.
- 23 October 1942: Jan Hofstede and Christiaan Pouwels, dropped near Holten in Overijssel and immediately arrested.
- 28 November 1942: de Kruijff and Charle Ruseler, dropped and immediately arrested.
- 29 November 1942: John Ubbink and Herman Overes, dropped and immediately arrested.
- 13 February 1943: Trix Terwindt, dropped and immediately arrested.
- 16 February 1943: Van de Nor, Kees Hulsteijn and Braggaar, dropped and immediately arrested.
- 18 February 1943: Gerrit van Os and Jan Kist, dropped near Voorthuizen in Gelderland and immediately arrested.
- 18 February 1943: Wim van der Wilden and his cousin Piet van der Wilden, dropped and immediately arrested.
- 19 February 1943: Pieter Dourlein, dropped near Ermelo in Gelderland and immediately arrested.
- 21 April 1943: Klaas Wegner, Freek Rouwers and Ivo Uytvanck, dropped and immediately arrested.
- 21 May 1943: Oscar de Brey, Anton Mink and Laurens Punt, dropped and immediately arrested.
- 7 October 1944: (After the end of Englandspiel) Harmen Koopmans and G. Ensink, dropped at Dokkum and immediately arrested. Koopmans killed at De Woeste Hoeve near Apeldoorn.

== In popular culture ==
- Englandspiel is the basis for the 1956 Italian film London chiama Polo Nordo/The House of Intrigu', directed by Duilio Coletti with Curt Jurgens, and based upon the novel by Hermann J. Giskes, head of the German wartime counterespionage Abwehr in the Netherlands.
- The Englandspiel is also featured in the Dutch World War II adventure novel trilogy Vliegers in het Vuur (1963) by the Dutch author Klaas Norel.
- The Englandspiel is mentioned implicitly in John le Carré's 1965 satirical spy novel The Looking Glass War. British spy and old hand Fred Leiser, who is to infiltrate East-Germany with an obsolete radioset in the Cold War, was one of the very few agents sent by the British who survived in The Netherlands during World War II.
- The 1977 Dutch movie Soldier of Orange (Dutch title: Soldaat van Oranje) by Paul Verhoeven was based on an autobiographical novel by Erik Hazelhoff Roelfzema and dramatises the wartime history of the Englandspiel. A successful long-running musical Soldaat van Oranje was performed in the Netherlands since 2010 and treats the same subject matter.
- Englandspiel is the subject of the "Confusion Was Their Business" episode (1998) of the Secrets of WWII documentary series, and of the "Dead on Arrival" episode (2012) of the Secret War documentary series, which both aired on the Military Channel in the United States.
- Englandspiel is the historical inspiration for "Elise" (2015), the last episode in Season 8 of the historical television drama Foyle's War.
- The story is recounted in the Encyclopedia Brown book, Encyclopedia Brown's Book of Wacky Spies, with an illustration showing agents parachuting into the arms of waiting German soldiers.
