= Hermann Giskes =

German spy (1896–1977)

Hermann Joseph Giskes
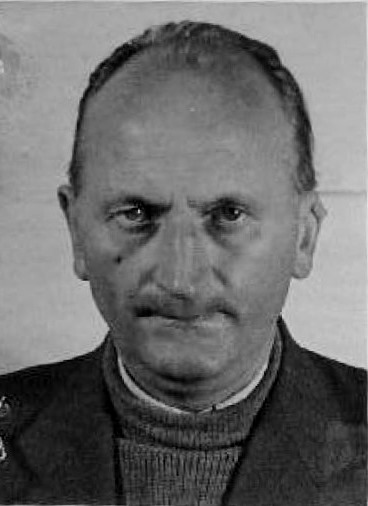
- Giskes c. 1945
- Born: 28 September 1896; Krefeld, Germany
- Died: 28 August 1977 (aged 80); Krefeld, Germany
- Military career
- Allegiance: Germany
- Branch: Abwehr
- Service years: 1939–1945
- Rank: Oberstleutnant (Lieutenant colonel)
- Conflicts: World War II

Hermann Josef Giskes (28 September 1896 – 28 August 1977) was a German intelligence officer of the Abwehr, the military intelligence department of the German military forces during World War II. He is best known for being the head of the counter-intelligence department of the Abwehr in the Netherlands from 1941 to 1944. He carried out an operation called Englandspiel or Operation North Pole which resulted in the capture of more than 50 agents of Britain's Special Operations Executive (SOE) and the confiscation of tons of military equipment, including weapons, which SOE had parachuted into the Netherlands to arm Dutch groups resisting the occupation of the Netherlands by Nazi Germany. Most of the captured agents were executed after being forced to participate in a disinformation campaign which led SOE to believe that its agents were being successful in organizing and supplying the Dutch resistance.

== Early life ==
Hermann Josef Giskes was born in Krefeld, the third of four children of Wilhelm and Maria Giskes. The father was a merchant and owner of a tobacco factory. After attending elementary school, he was a student at the high school in Krefeld from 1905 and in Karthaus-Konz from 1911/12. In 1913/14 he attended the higher commercial school in Krefeld.

On October 1, 1914, he served as a volunteer in the 1st Lower Alsatian Field Artillery Regiment No. 31 in Hagenau in Alsace during the First World War. In December 1914 he was transferred to the Snowshoe Battalion No. 2, with which he took part in battles in the Carpathians, South Tyrol and Serbia. In 1916, Giskes and his unit were deployed on the Western Front, where he was wounded several times and received the Iron Cross, Second Class. In March 1917 he became a lieutenant in the reserve and, as he was unfit for front-line service, was an instructor with the mountain infantry replacement battalion in Immenstadt in the Allgäu until April 1918. From April 1918, Giskes was again on the Western Front with Infantry Regiment No. 471, where he was taken prisoner by the French on October 12, 1918.

Released from captivity in March 1920, Giskes went back to Krefeld, initially worked for his father as a tobacco dealer and was married in 1925. He had no children. In 1926 he became self-employed as a tobacco importer and dealer. A first lieutenant in the reserve since 1929, he took part in reserve exercises from 1936 and was promoted to captain in the reserve in 1938.

== World War II ==
Giskes is best known as the leader behind the Englandspiel operation. His activities were responsible for supplying a great deal of disinformation to British intelligence services for much of World War II, and for the arrest of more than 50 Special Operations Executive (SOE) agents, nearly all of whom were executed. Giskes first succeeded in forcing captured SOE agent Huub Lauwers under duress to send encrypted messages back to the British SOE headquarters at Giskes' direction. Lauwers attempted to warn SOE that he had been captured by omitting security checks from his messages, but the SOE failed to recognize his warning. As a result, dozens of SOE agents parachuted into the Netherlands and were captured by the Germans on their arrival, along with tons of equipment.

Giskes continued to use captured SOE radios to mislead the SOE, who failed to recognize, despite many clues, that its operations in the Netherlands were controlled by the Germans. When the Royal Air Force refused in May 1943 to continue clandestine flights delivering agents and arms to the Netherlands because of heavy losses of airplanes and crews, no more agents could be sent to the Netherlands by the SOE. In fall 1943, two Dutch SOE agents escaped German imprisonment and informed SOE in London that its operations in the Netherlands had been a sham.

When it became apparent to the British that SOE's operations in the Netherlands were under the control of the Germans, Giskes on 1 April 1944 sent the following taunting message in clear (unencrypted text) to London:

To [the SOE section chiefs] Messrs Blunt, (Note: 'Blunt' refers to a pseudonym used by Major Charles Blizard, Head of N (Dutch) Section SOE.) Bingham (Note: Major Seymour Bingham, his successor as Head of N Section.) and Succs Ltd., London. In the last time you are trying to make business in Netherlands without our assistance stop we think this rather unfair in view of our long and successful co-operation as your sole agents stop but never mind whenever you will come to pay a visit to the Continent you may be assured that you will be received with the same care and result as all those who you sent us before stop so long.

In 1945, near the end of World War II, Giskes was captured by Allied forces and interrogated by both the British and the Americans. He was released in September 1946, and became an employee of the Gehlen Organization, an intelligence company that worked with the American occupation authorities in a defeated Germany.

In 1953, he published a memoir, London Calling North Pole, recounting his experiences in World War II.
