= Violette Szabo =

French espionage agent (1921–1945)

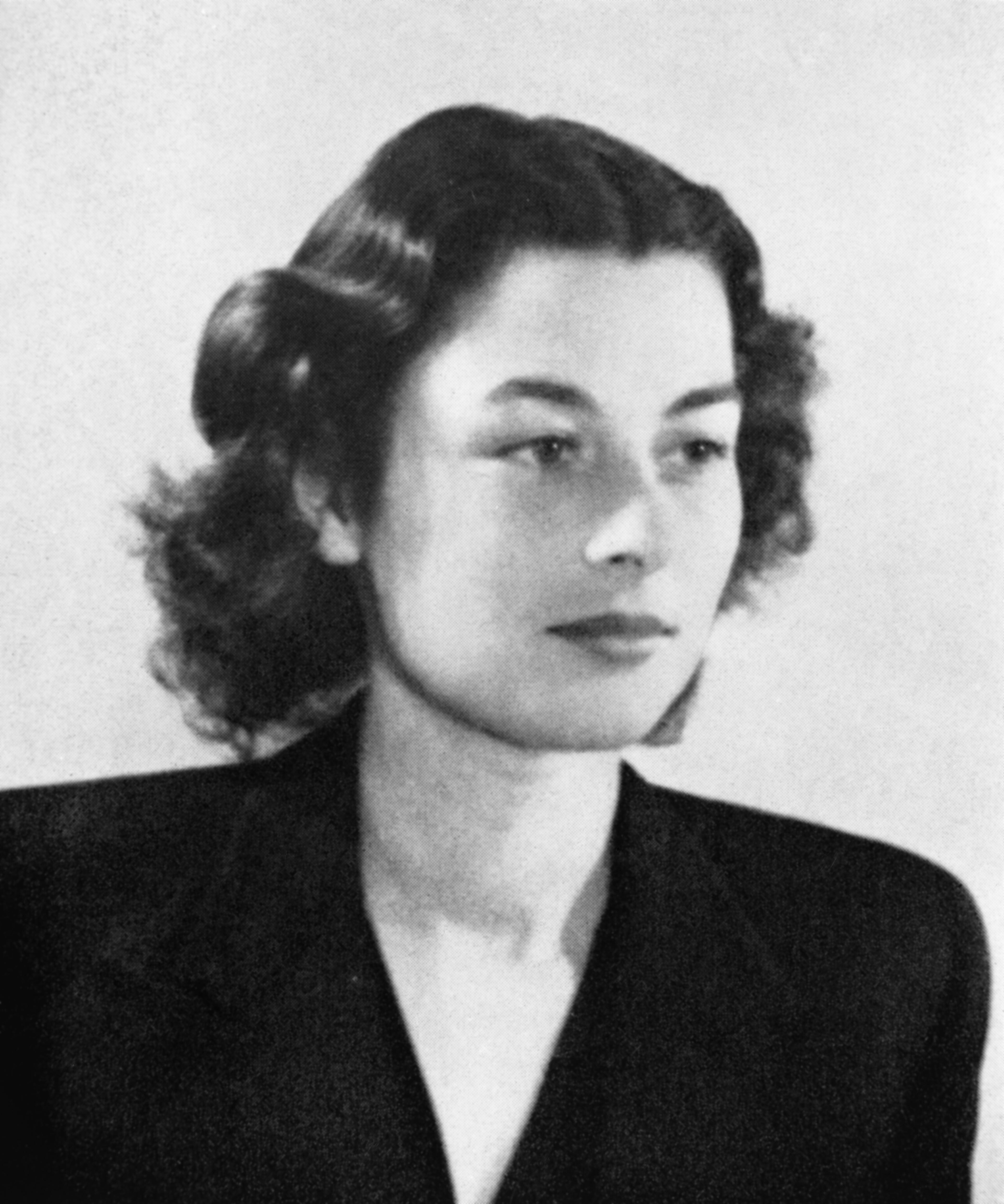
- Violette Szabo c.1944
- Born: 26 June 1921; Paris, France
- Died: 5 February 1945 (aged 23); KZ Ravensbrück, Germany
- Military career
- Allegiance: United Kingdom
- Branch: Auxiliary Territorial Service; First Aid Nursing Yeomanry
- Service years: 1941–1945
- Rank: Ensign
- Units: Special Operations Executive; F Section
- Conflicts: Second World War
- Awards: George Cross; Croix de Guerre (France); Resistance Medal (France)

Violette Reine Elizabeth Szabo (née Bushell; 26 June 1921 – c. 5 February 1945) was a British-French Special Operations Executive (SOE) agent during the Second World War and a posthumous recipient of the George Cross. On her second mission into occupied France, Szabo was captured by the German army, interrogated, tortured, and deported to Ravensbrück concentration camp in Germany, where she was executed.

== Early life ==
Violette Bushell was born on 26 June 1921 in Paris, France, to Charles George Bushell and Reine Blanche Leroy, as the second child of five and the only daughter. Szabo's father, son of a publican from Hampstead Norreys, was serving as a British Army driver in France during the First World War when he met her mother, a dressmaker originally from Pont-Remy, Somme. After the war the couple lived in London, where Charles worked as a taxi-driver, car salesman and shopkeeper.

During the early 1930s, as a result of the Great Depression, Bushell and her youngest brother, Dickie, lived with their maternal aunt in Picardy, northern France. The family was reunited in South London when Violette was 11 years old. (Note: First at 12 Stockwell Park Walk (now demolished), then at 18 Burnley Road, Stockwell, where she is commemorated by a Blue Plaque unveiled by the Greater London Council in 1981.) She was an active and lively girl, enjoying gymnastics, long-distance bicycling and ice-skating with four brothers and several male cousins. Bushell was regarded as a tomboy, especially after being taught to shoot by her father; her shooting was reputedly very accurate.

While Bushell had temporarily lost the ability to speak English in Picardy, she quickly relearned the language while attending school in Brixton. There she was reportedly popular and regarded as exotic, owing to her ability to speak another language. Her home life was loving, though she often clashed with her strict father and once ran away to France after an argument. The family, except her monolingual father, would often converse in French.

At the age of 14, Bushell went to work for a French corsetière in South Kensington and later worked at retailer Woolworths in Oxford Street. At the outbreak of the Second World War, she was working at Le Bon Marché, a Brixton department store.

== Second World War ==
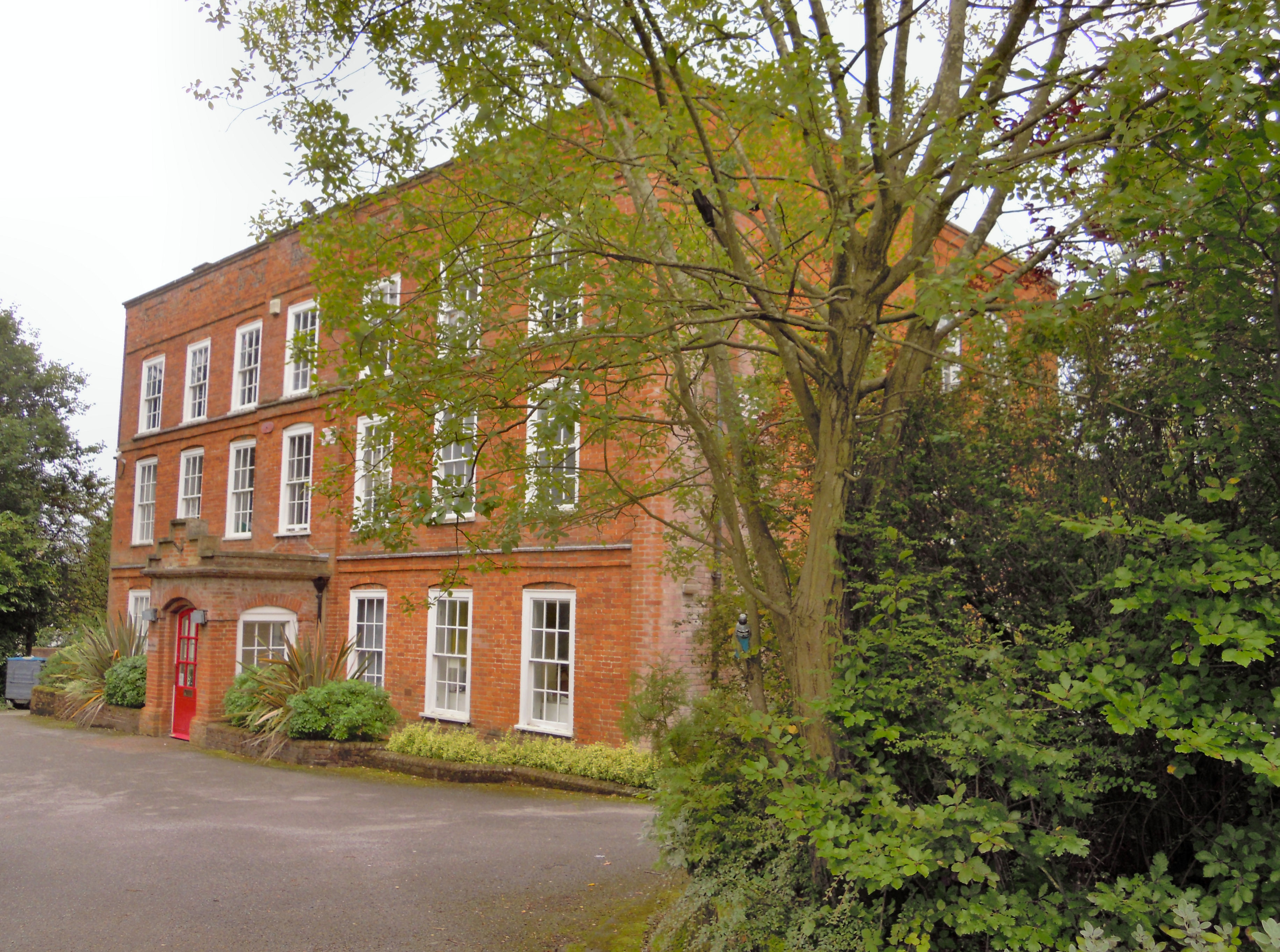
The former Register Office in Aldershot, Hampshire where the Szabos married in 1940

In early 1940, Bushell joined the Women's Land Army and was sent to carry out strawberry picking in Fareham, Hampshire, but she soon returned to London to work in an armaments factory in Acton. She met Étienne Szabo, a decorated non-commissioned officer in the French Foreign Legion of Hungarian descent, at the Bastille Day parade in London in 1940, where Bushell had been sent by her mother, accompanied by her friend Winnie Wilson, to bring home a homesick French soldier for dinner. They married at Aldershot Register Office in Manor Park on 21 August 1940 after a 42-day romance; Violette was 19, Étienne was 31. They enjoyed a week's honeymoon before Étienne set off from Liverpool to fight in the abortive Free French attack on Dakar, Senegal. From there, he went to South Africa before seeing action, again against the Vichy French, in the successful Anglo-Free French campaigns in Eritrea and Syria in 1941. He returned to the UK for a brief leave later in the year.

After her marriage, Szabo became a switchboard operator for the General Post Office in central London, working throughout the Blitz. Bored by the job, she enlisted in the Auxiliary Territorial Service (ATS) on 11 September 1941. She was posted to Leicester for initial training before being sent to one of the first mixed anti-aircraft batteries of the 7th Heavy Anti-Aircraft Training Regiment, Royal Artillery in Oswestry, Shropshire for specialised instruction as a predictor and then to the 481st Heavy (Mixed) Anti-Aircraft Battery. After further training in Anglesey, Gunner Szabo and her unit were posted to Frodsham, Cheshire, near Warrington, from December 1941 to February 1942. Szabo found within weeks that she was pregnant, so she left the ATS to return to London for the birth.

Szabo took a flat in Notting Hill, which was to be her home until she left for her second mission to France in June 1944. On 8 June 1942, she gave birth to Tania Damaris Desiree Szabo at St Mary's Hospital while Étienne was stationed at Bir Hakeim in North Africa. The following day, he took part in a valiant defence against the Afrika Korps, escaping with his battalion from the assault of the 15th Panzer Division on 10 June.

Szabo sent her baby to childminders while she worked at the South Morden aircraft factory, where her father was stationed. During this period, she was informed of her husband's death in action. Étienne had died on 24 October 1942 from chest wounds received while leading his men in a diversionary attack on Qaret el Himeimat, at the beginning of the Second Battle of El Alamein; he had never seen his daughter. It was Étienne's death that made Szabo accept an offer to train as a field agent in the British Special Operations Executive (SOE) as her best way of fighting the enemy that had killed her husband.

== Special Operations Executive ==
It is unclear how or why Szabo was recruited by F-Section, as her surviving official file is thin, but her fluency in French and her previous service in the ATS probably brought her to the attention of SOE. She would have been invited to an interview regarding war work with E. Potter, the alias of Selwyn Jepson, a detective novelist and the F-Section recruiter. Szabo was given security clearance on 1 July 1943 and selected for training as a field agent on 10 July. She was commissioned as a section leader in the First Aid Nursing Yeomanry, a civilian service often used by SOE as a cover for female agents.

After an assessment for fluency in French and a series of interviews, Szabo was sent from 7–27 August to STS 4, a training school at Winterfold House, and after a moderately favourable report, to Special Training School 24 of Group A at Arisaig in the Scottish Highlands in September and October. Szabo received intensive instruction in fieldcraft, night and daylight navigation, weapons and demolition. Again her reports were mixed, but she passed the course and moved on to Group B.

Szabo was sent to the SOE "finishing school" at Beaulieu, Hampshire, where she learnt escape and evasion, uniform recognition, communications and cryptography, and had further training in weaponry. The final stage in training was parachute jumping, which was taught at Ringway Airport near Manchester. On her first attempt, Szabo badly sprained her ankle and was sent home for recuperation, spending some time in Bournemouth (it was this ankle that was to fail her later in France). She was able to take the parachuting course again and passed with a second class in February 1944. On 24 January 1944, Szabo made her will, witnessed by Vera Atkins and Major R. A. Bourne Paterson of SOE, naming her mother, Reine, as executrix and her daughter Tania as sole beneficiary.

In 2012 Max Hastings wrote that Szabo was "adored by the men and women of SOE both for her courage and endless infectious Cockney laughter", while Leo Marks remembered her as "A dark-haired slip of mischief....She had a Cockney accent which added to her impishness". Assessments by her trainers were mixed: "she lacks ruse, stability and the finesse which is required and...she is too easily influenced...[but] she set an example to the whole party by her cheerfulness and eagerness to please".

=== First mission ===
Due to the ankle injury, Szabo's first deployment was delayed, but it was during her second course at Ringway that she first met Philippe Liewer (d. c. 1948). While in London, she also socialised with Bob Maloubier, so SOE decided she would work as a courier for Liewer's Salesman circuit. However, the mission was postponed when F Section received a signal from Harry Peulevé's (codename Jean) Author circuit warning that several members of the Rouen-Dieppe group had been arrested, including Claude Malraux (codename Cicero; brother of novelist Andre Malraux) and radio operator Isidore Newman. This extra time meant Szabo could be sent for a refresher course in wireless operation in London, and it was then that Leo Marks, SOE's cryptographer, seeing her struggle with her original French nursery rhyme, gave Szabo his own composition, The Life That I Have as her code poem.

On the night of 5/6 April 1944, Szabo and Liewer were flown from RAF Tempsford in Bedfordshire in a Westland Lysander aircraft and landed in German-occupied France, near the village of Azay-le-Rideau in the heart of the Loire Valley. Her cover was that she was a commercial secretary named Corinne Reine Leroy (the latter two names being her mother's first and maiden names), who was born on 26 June 1921 (her real birthdate) in Bailleul, and who was a resident of Le Havre, which gave her reason to travel to the Restricted Zone of German occupation on the coast.

Under the code name "Louise", which happened to be her nickname (she was also nicknamed "La P'tite Anglaise", as she stood only 5'3" tall), she and SOE colleague Philippe Liewer (under the name "Major Charles Staunton"), organiser of the Salesman circuit, tried to assess the damage made by the German arrests, with Szabo travelling to Rouen, where Liewer could not go as a wanted man (both he and Maloubier were on wanted posters with their codenames), and to Dieppe to gather intelligence and carry out reconnaissance. It soon became clear that the circuit, which originally involved over 120 members (80 in Rouen and 40 on the coast) had been exposed beyond repair. Szabo returned to Paris to brief Liewer, and in the two days, before they were due to depart, she bought a dress for Tania, three frocks and a yellow sweater for herself, and perfume for her mother and herself. While the destruction of Salesman was a heavy blow to SOE, her reports on the local factories producing war materials for the Germans were important in establishing Allied bombing targets.

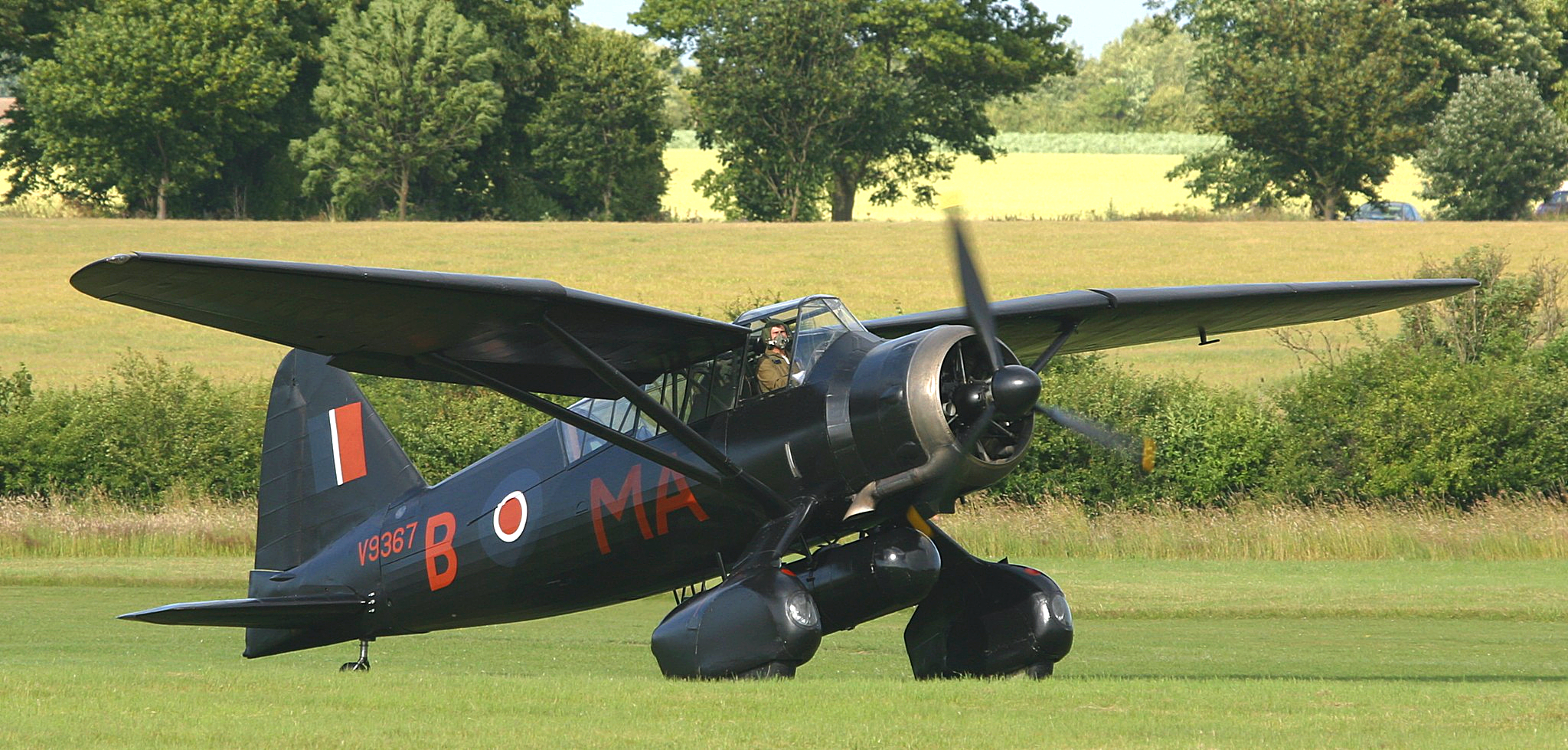
Westland Lysander MkIII (SD)

She returned to England by Lysander, piloted by Bob Large, DFC, of the RAF, on 30 April 1944, landing after a stressful flight in which the plane was hit by anti-aircraft fire over Chateaudun, and Szabo was thrown about the body of the plane. Large had turned off the intercom when attacked and did not turn it back on for the rest of the flight, so when the plane landed heavily due to a burst tyre, and he went to get Szabo out, she (thinking they had been shot down and not having seen her blond pilot) let Large have a volley of abuse in French, mistaking him for a German. When she realised what had really happened, he was rewarded with a kiss. Philippe Liewer returned at the same time in another Lysander. On 24 May 1944 Szabo was promoted to Ensign in the FANY.

=== Second mission ===
After two aborted attempts, due to stormy weather on the night of 4/5 June and the abandonment of the intended landing ground on 5/6 June by the Resistance reception committee because of German patrols, Szabo and three colleagues were dropped by parachute from a USAAF Liberator flown from RAF Harrington in Northamptonshire onto a landing field near Sussac on the outskirts of Limoges early on 8 June 1944 (immediately following D-Day, and Tania Szabo's second birthday). (Note: Vickers provides a useful illustrated narrative of Szabo's second mission and her capture by elements of 'Das Reich'.) Szabo was part of a four-person team sent to operate in the department of Haute Vienne with the circuit codename 'Salesman II', led by her SOE commander Philippe Liewer (now codenamed Hamlet), whose rolled-up Rouen circuit had been 'Salesman', and including Second Lieutenant Jean-Claude Guiet (codenames Claude and Virgile) of the United States Army as wireless operator (W/O), and Bob Maloubier (alias Robert 'Bob' Mortier; codenames Clothaire and Paco), Szabo and Liewer's friend and comrade of SOE who was to act as military instructor to the local Maquis, and who had worked as weapons instructor and explosives officer for Liewer on the original Salesman I circuit. For this mission, Szabo's cover was that she was a Mme Villeret, the young widow of an antiques dealer from Nantes. It is possible Szabo twisted an ankle on landing.

Upon arrival, she was sent to co-ordinate the activities of the local maquis in sabotaging communication lines during German attempts to stem the Normandy landings. When he arrived in the Limousin, Philippe Liewer found the local maquis to be poorly led and less prepared for action than he had expected. To better co-ordinate Resistance activity against the Germans, he decided to send his courier, Szabo, as his liaison officer to the more active Maquis of Correze and the Dordogne, led by Jacques Poirier (SOE), head of the renamed Digger circuit, who had taken over from Harry Peulevé of the Author circuit, upon the latter's arrest. However, due to poor intelligence gathering by the local Resistance, Liewer was unaware that the 2nd SS Panzer Division was making its slow journey north to the Normandy battlefields through his area.

== Capture and interrogation ==
At 9.30 am on 10 June, Szabo set off on her mission, not inconspicuously by bicycle as Liewer would have preferred, but in a Citroen driven by a young maquis section leader, Jacques Dufour ('Anastasie'). He had insisted upon using the car, even though the Germans had forbidden the use of cars by the French after D-Day, to drive her half of the 100 kilometres (62 mi) of her journey. At her request to Liewer, Szabo was armed with a Sten gun and eight magazines of ammunition. She was dressed in a light suit, flat-heeled shoes and no stockings. On their way across the sunlit fields of south-central France, they picked up Jean Bariaud, a 26-year-old Resistance friend of Dufour, who was meant to accompany them on the return journey.

Their car raised the suspicions of German troops at an unexpected roadblock outside of Salon-la-Tour that had been set up to find Sturmbannführer Helmut Kämpfe, a battalion commander of the 2nd SS Panzer Division, who had been captured by the local resistance. (Note: Tania Szabo suggests in her semi-biography of her mother, Young, Brave and Beautiful, p. 389, that the troops may have been SS-Feldgendarmerie from Salon-Le-Tour who were protecting 'Das Reich's' rear) When Dufour slowed the car, the unarmed Bariaud was able to escape and later warn the Salesman team of the arrest of his two companions.

According to Minney and Vickers, when they had stopped, Szabo and Dufour leapt from the car, he to the left and she to the right and the cover of a tree, as Dufour opened fire. A gun battle ensued during which a woman emerging from a barn was killed by the Germans. As armoured cars arrived at the scene, Szabo crossed the road to join Dufour, and they leapt a gate, before running across a field towards a small stream. They then ran up a hill towards some trees, when Szabo fell and severely twisted an ankle. She refused Dufour's offer of help, urging him to flee, and, dragging herself to the edge of the cornfield, she struggled to an apple tree. Standing behind the tree, she then provided Dufour with covering fire, allowing him to make his escape to hide in a friend's barn. Szabo fought the Germans for thirty minutes, killing a corporal, possibly more, and wounding some others. Eventually, she ran out of ammunition and was captured by two men who dragged her up the hill to a bridge over a railway. She was hot, dishevelled, and in pain. Szabo was questioned by a young officer whose armoured car had drawn up nearby. She was then taken away. Szabo's captors were most likely from the 1st Battalion of 3rd SS Panzer Grenadier Regiment Deutschland (Das Reich Division) whose commanding officer was the missing Sturmbannführer Kämpfe.

In R.J. Minney's biography, as above, she is described as putting up fierce resistance with her Sten gun, although German documents of the incident record no German injuries or casualties. A recent biography of Vera Atkins, the intelligence officer for the French section of SOE, notes that there was a great deal of confusion about what happened to Szabo—the story was revised four times—and states that the Sten gun incident "was probably a fabrication". Szabo's most recent biographer, Susan Ottaway, includes the battle in her book, as does Tania Szabo in hers, and Philip Vickers in his book on Das Reich. Authors Sarah Helm and Max Hastings express doubt about the story of the battle.

Violette Szabo was transferred to the custody of the Sicherheitsdienst (SD, the SS Security Service) in Limoges, where she was interrogated for four days by SS-Sturmbannführer Kowatch. She gave her name as "Vicky Taylor", the name she had intended to use if she needed to return to England via Spain. (Her reason for choosing this name is unknown, but it may have been a play on szabo being the Hungarian word for "tailor".) From there, she was moved to Fresnes Prison in Paris and brought to Gestapo headquarters at 84 Avenue Foch for interrogation and torture by the Sicherheitsdienst, who by now knew of her true identity and activities as an SOE agent.

== Ravensbrück ==
With the Allies driving deep into France and George Patton's Third US Army heading towards Paris, the decision was taken by the Germans to send their most valuable French prisoners to Germany. On 8 August 1944, Szabo, shackled to SOE wireless operator Denise Bloch, was entrained with other male and female prisoners, including several SOE agents she knew, for transfer. At some point in the journey, probably outside Chalons-sur-Marne, an Allied air raid caused the guards to temporarily abandon the train, allowing shackled Szabo and Bloch to get water from a lavatory to F.F.E. Yeo-Thomas and other male prisoners on the train. The two women inspired the men and boosted their morale. When the train reached Reims, the prisoners were taken by lorries to a large barn for two nights, where Szabo, still tied at the ankle to Bloch, who was in good spirits, washed some of her clothes in a rudimentary fashion and told her SOE colleague Harry Peulevé about her experiences.

From Reims, via Strasbourg, the prisoners went by train to Saarbrücken and a transit camp in the suburb of Neue Bremm, where hygiene facilities were nonexistent, and food was only indigestible bread crusts. After about ten days, Szabo and most of the other women were sent on to Ravensbrück concentration camp for women where 50,000 (out of a total population of 130,000) were to die during the war. They reached Ravensbrück in late August 1944.

Although she endured hard labour and malnutrition, she helped save the life of Belgian resistance courier Hortense Daman, kept up the spirits of her fellow detainees, and, according to fellow inmate American Virginia d'Albert-Lake, constantly planned to escape. While at Ravensbrück, Szabo, Denise Bloch, Lilian Rolfe and Lake were among 1,000 French women sent to the Heinkel factory at the sub-camp of Torgau. Here they protested and refused to make munitions, and were forced to work in the vegetable cellar outside the camp walls and then to dig potatoes. The British women also made contact with French prisoners at a nearby POW camp who, being better fed, provided them with extra rations and offered to send messages to London with a transmitter they had built (there is no evidence they were successful).

After the Torgau incident, Szabo, Bloch, Rolfe and Lake were part of a group of around 250 prisoners sent back to Ravensbrück on 6 October, where Szabo was put to work in the fabric store. In late October 1944, the protest women were transferred to a punishment camp at Königsberg, where they were forced into harsh physical labour felling trees, clearing rock-hard icy ground for the construction of an airfield and digging a trench for a narrow-gauge railway. Szabo volunteered for tree-felling in the forest, where the trees gave some shelter from the bitter winds (Lilian and Denise were too ill to join her). In the bitter East Prussian winter of 1944, each day the women were forced to stand for Appell (roll-call) in the early morning for up to five hours before being sent to work, many of them freezing to death. Szabo was dressed only in the summer clothes she had been wearing when sent to Germany and the women received barely any food and slept in frozen barracks without blankets. According to Christine Le Scornet, a seventeen-year-old French girl whom Szabo befriended, and Jeannie Rousseau, the co-leader of the Torgau revolt, she maintained her morale, was optimistic about liberation and continued to plan to escape. On 19 or 20 January 1945, the three British agents were recalled to Ravensbrück and sent first to the Strafblock, where they were possibly brutally assaulted and then to the punishment bunker, where they were kept in solitary confinement. The women were already in poor physical condition—Rolfe could barely walk—and the abuse finally weakened Szabo's morale. (Note: There is some evidence that Szabo was raped while in German custody but this would have been contrary to usual SS, SD, and Gestapo practice (for all their individual and collective crimes, the men of these organisations regarded themselves as professionals with, however perverted, a sense of honour.))

=== Execution ===
Szabo was killed in the execution alley at Ravensbrück, aged 23, on or before 5 February 1945. She was shot in the back of the head while kneeling down, by SS-Rottenführer Schult in the presence of camp commandant Fritz Suhren (who pronounced the death penalty), camp overseer and deputy commandant Johann Schwarzhuber, SS-Scharführer Zappe, SS-Rottenführer Walter Schenk (responsible for the crematorium), chief camp doctor Dr. Richard Trommer and dentist Dr. Martin Hellinger, from the deposition of Schwarzhuber recorded by Vera Atkins 13 March 1946. Denise Bloch and Lilian Rolfe – neither of whom could walk and were carried on stretchers – were shot at the same time, by order of the highest Nazi authorities; the bodies were disposed of in the camp crematorium. Their clothes were not returned to the camp Effektenkammer (property store) as usually happened after executions. (Note: Mary Lindell, an escape line organiser also imprisoned in Ravensbrück, believed the three women agents were hanged, as was the usual practice in the camp and their clothes distributed to other prisoners. Vera Atkins's detailed investigations, including interrogations of Suhren, Schwatzhuber and others who were involved in the killings, established the official version of execution by shooting in the back of the neck. In 2015, Helm cast doubt on Schwarzhuber's account, suggesting he was trying to give a veneer of dignity to the killings in his interrogations and pointing out that several French agents transported to Ravensbrück along with the three SOE agents, had been executed by hanging shortly before.)

=== Comparisons ===
Along with Szabo, Bloch, and Rolfe, one other member of the SOE was also executed at Ravensbrück: Cecily Lefort. She was killed in the gas chamber sometime in February 1945.

Forty-one female Section F SOE agents served in France, some for more than two years, most for only a few months. Twenty-six of them survived World War II. Twelve were executed including Szabo, one was killed when her ship was sunk, two died of disease while imprisoned, and one died of natural causes. Female agents ranged in age from 20 to 53 years.

== Awards and honours ==
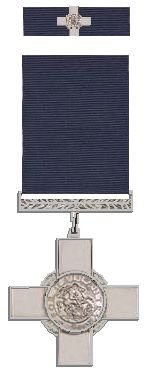
George Cross and its ribbon bar

Szabo was the second woman to be awarded the George Cross, bestowed posthumously on 17 December 1946. The citation was published in the London Gazette and read:

St. James's Palace, S.W.1. 17 December 1946

The KING has been graciously pleased to award the GEORGE CROSS to: —

Violette, Madame SZABO (deceased), Women's Transport Service (First Aid Nursing Yeomanry).

Madame Szabo volunteered to undertake a particularly dangerous mission in France. She was parachuted into France in April 1944, and undertook the task with enthusiasm. In her execution of the delicate researches entailed she showed great presence of mind and astuteness. She was twice arrested by the German security authorities but each time managed to get away. Eventually, however, with other members of her group, she was surrounded by the Gestapo in a house in the south-west of France. Resistance appeared hopeless but Madame Szabo, seizing a Sten-gun and as much ammunition as she could carry, barricaded herself in part of the house and, exchanging shot for shot with the enemy, killed or wounded several of them. By constant movement, she avoided being cornered and fought until she dropped exhausted. She was arrested and had to undergo solitary confinement. She was then continuously and atrociously tortured but never by word or deed gave away any of her acquaintances or told the enemy anything of any value. She was ultimately executed. Madame Szabo gave a magnificent example of courage and steadfastness.

The croix de guerre avec étoile de bronze was awarded by the French government in 1947 and the Médaille de la Résistance in 1973. As one of the SOE agents who died for the liberation of France, Lieutenant Violette Szabo, FANY, is listed on the Valençay SOE Memorial.

Both Violette and Étienne Szabo were awarded the French Croix de Guerre for their bravery in the field. On 28 January 1947 their four-year-old daughter Tania was presented with Violette's George Cross (gazetted on 17 December 1946) from King George VI on behalf of her late mother. Violette and Étienne Szabo are believed to be the most decorated married couple of the Second World War. (Note: Odette Sansom and Peter Churchill did not marry until 1947 (dissolved 1956))

On 22 July 2015, Violette Szabo's medals and numerous associated items were sold at auction, realising £260,000 (£312,000 including buyer's premium). The purchaser was Lord Ashcroft, who placed the George Cross on permanent display at the Imperial War Museum from 7 October 2015.

== Museums and memorials ==
Szabo has no known grave. Her official point of commemoration is the Commonwealth War Graves Commission Brookwood 1939–1945 Memorial to the Missing in Brookwood Military Cemetery, Surrey. She is named on panel 26, column 3.

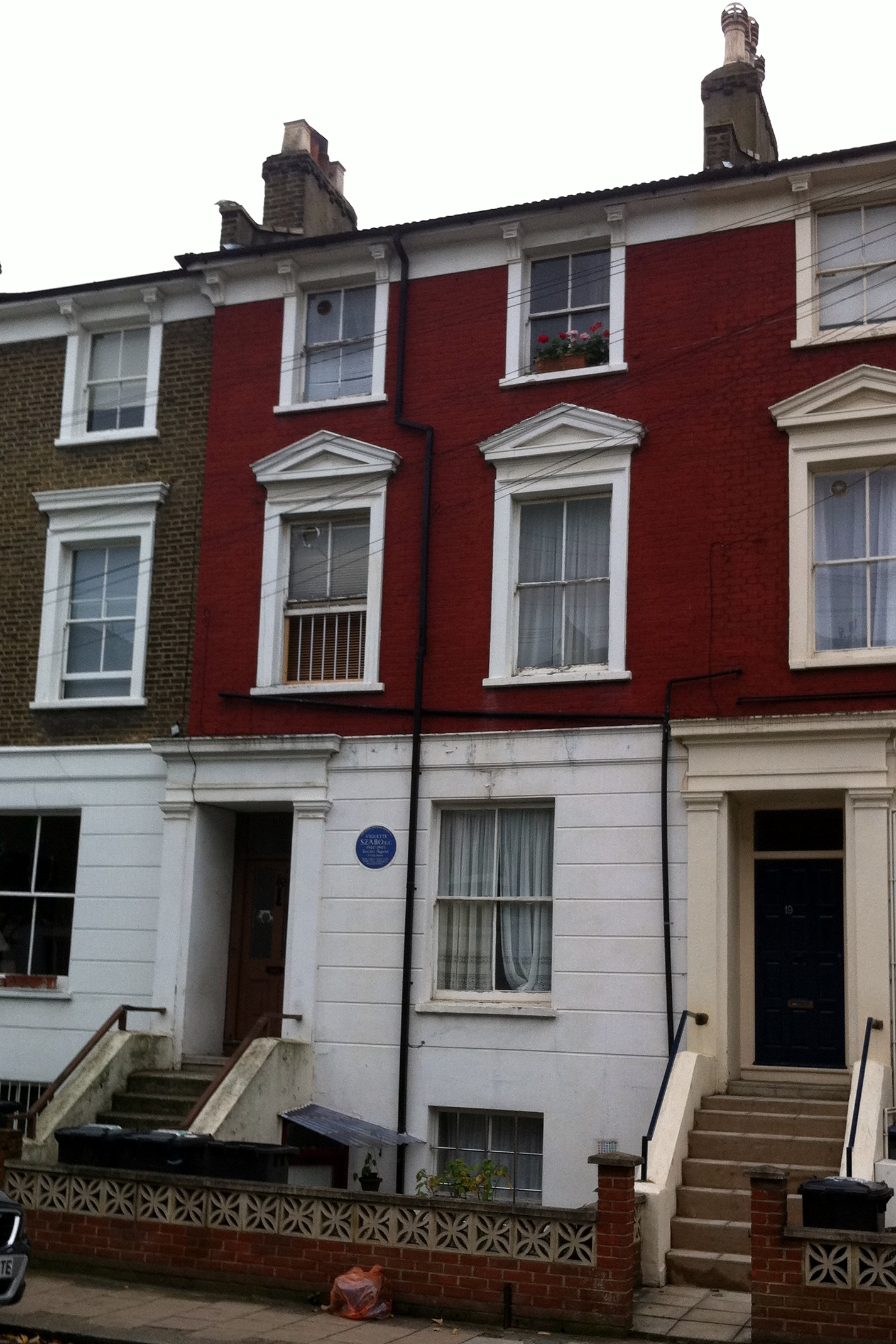
There is a blue plaque on the wall of the house where Violette Szabo grew up in Burnley Road, Stockwell.

The Violette Szabo GC Museum is housed in the cottage in Wormelow Tump, Herefordshire, that Violette's English cousins formerly owned, and that Violette would visit before the war to enjoy walks in the surrounding hills. She also stayed at the farm while she was recuperating from her ankle injury and between her two missions to France. Tania Szabo attended the museum's opening in 2000, as did Virginia McKenna, Leo Marks and members of SOE.

The Jersey War Tunnels have a permanent exhibition room dedicated to Szabo.

The Royal College of Music offers an annual award called the Violette Szabo GC Memorial Prize for pianists who accompany singers.

There is a mural dedicated to Szabo in Stockwell, South London, painted in 2001: Stockwell War Memorial, Stockwell Road. Painted on the exterior of the entrance to a deep level shelter, this mural was executed by Brian Barnes (with the assistance of children from Stockwell Park School). It features Stockwell's famous people such as Szabo and Vincent Van Gogh. It also commemorates the local people who gave their life in the war.

In 2008, a bronze bust of Szabo by sculptor Karen Newman was unveiled at the Albert Embankment of the River Thames, in front of Lambeth Palace.

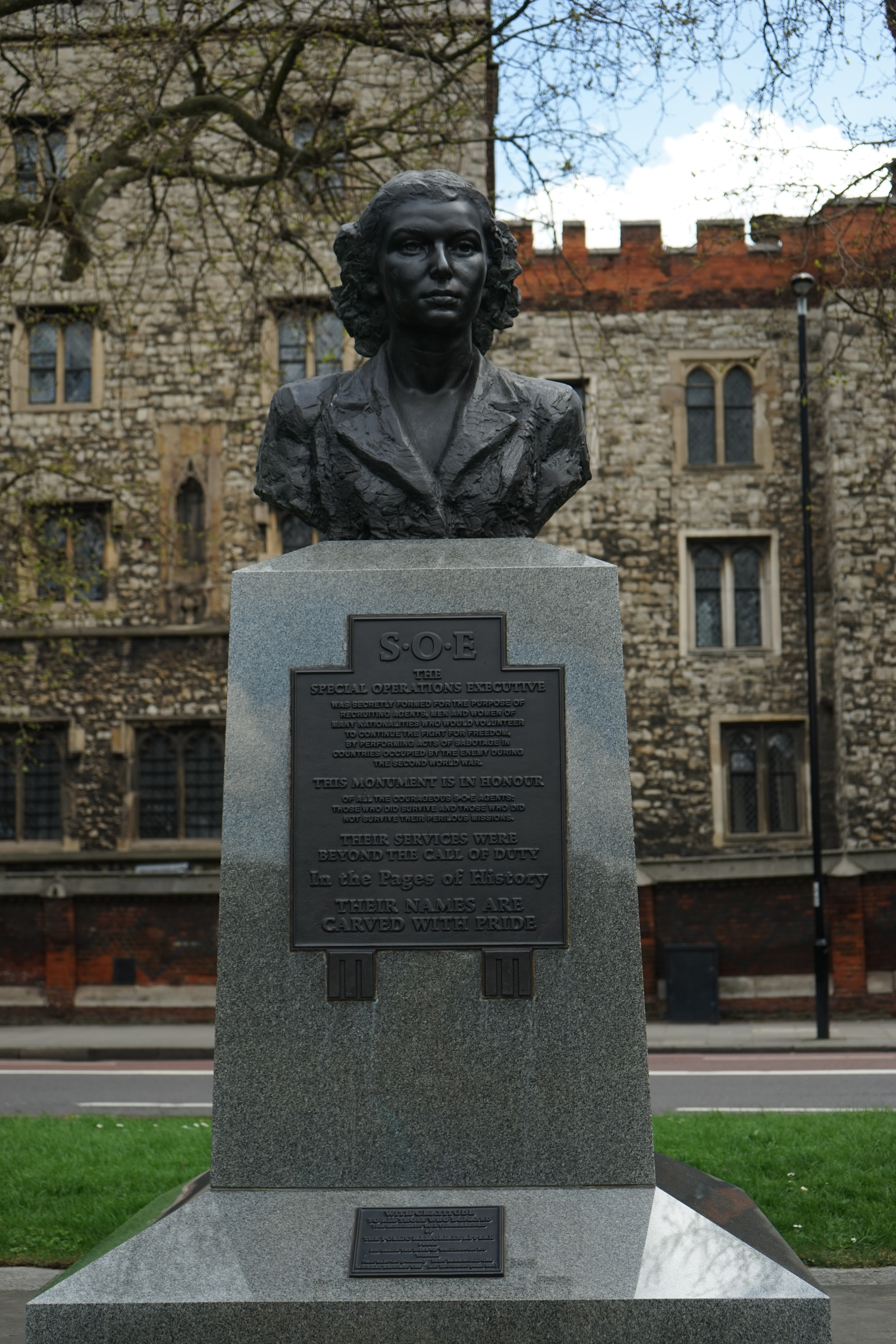
Violette Szabo SOE agent memorial in front of Lambeth Palace

At the entrance to Lambeth Town Hall there is a plaque commemorating Szabo's residence in that borough.

There is a memorial to Szabo in Le Clos, close to where the Salesman II team landed on 8 June 1944. She is named on the SOE memorial at Valençay to the agents of F Section who gave their lives for the liberation of France, and also on the memorial to the SOE agents who flew from England but did not return at RAF Tempsford.

There is also a memorial to Szabo at the entrance to the rugby field in the village of Salon-la-Tour, where she was captured.

== Media ==
Szabo's daughter, Tania Szabo, wrote a reconstruction of her two 1944 missions in France with flashbacks to her growing up. Author Jack Higgins wrote the foreword and US-French radio-operator, Jean-Claude Guiet, who had accompanied her on the mission in the Limousin, wrote the introduction. On 15 November 2007, at the launch of the book, Young Brave and Beautiful: The Missions of Special Operations Executive Agent Lieutenant Violette Szabo (ISBN 978-0750962094), at the Jersey War Tunnels, the Lieutenant Governor of Jersey said of her, "She's an inspiration to those young people today doing the same work with the risk of the same dangers". Odette Churchill GC said, "She was the bravest of us all."

Szabo's wartime activities in German-occupied France were dramatised in the film Carve Her Name with Pride, starring Virginia McKenna and based on the 1956 book of the same name by R. J. Minney.

The 2009 video game Velvet Assassin by Replay Studios is inspired by Szabo's life as an allied spy during the Second World War, with the protagonist sharing her first name.

The 2018 ten minute short play, "The Life That I Have", developed for the 365 Days of Women by playwright Libby Mitchell, is inspired by Szabo's last moments and her time in Ravensbrück. It also includes the heroines Vera Atkins, Denise Bloch, and Lilian Rolfe.

In June 2018, her daughter Tania was interviewed about her mother for the Pioneering Women Special airing on BBC's Antiques Roadshow, Series 41.

Sisters of Night and Fog by Erika Robuck is a historical novel that features Violette as well as another French Resistance fighter, Virginia d'Albert-Lake.
