= Diana Rowden =

British espionage agent (1915–1944)

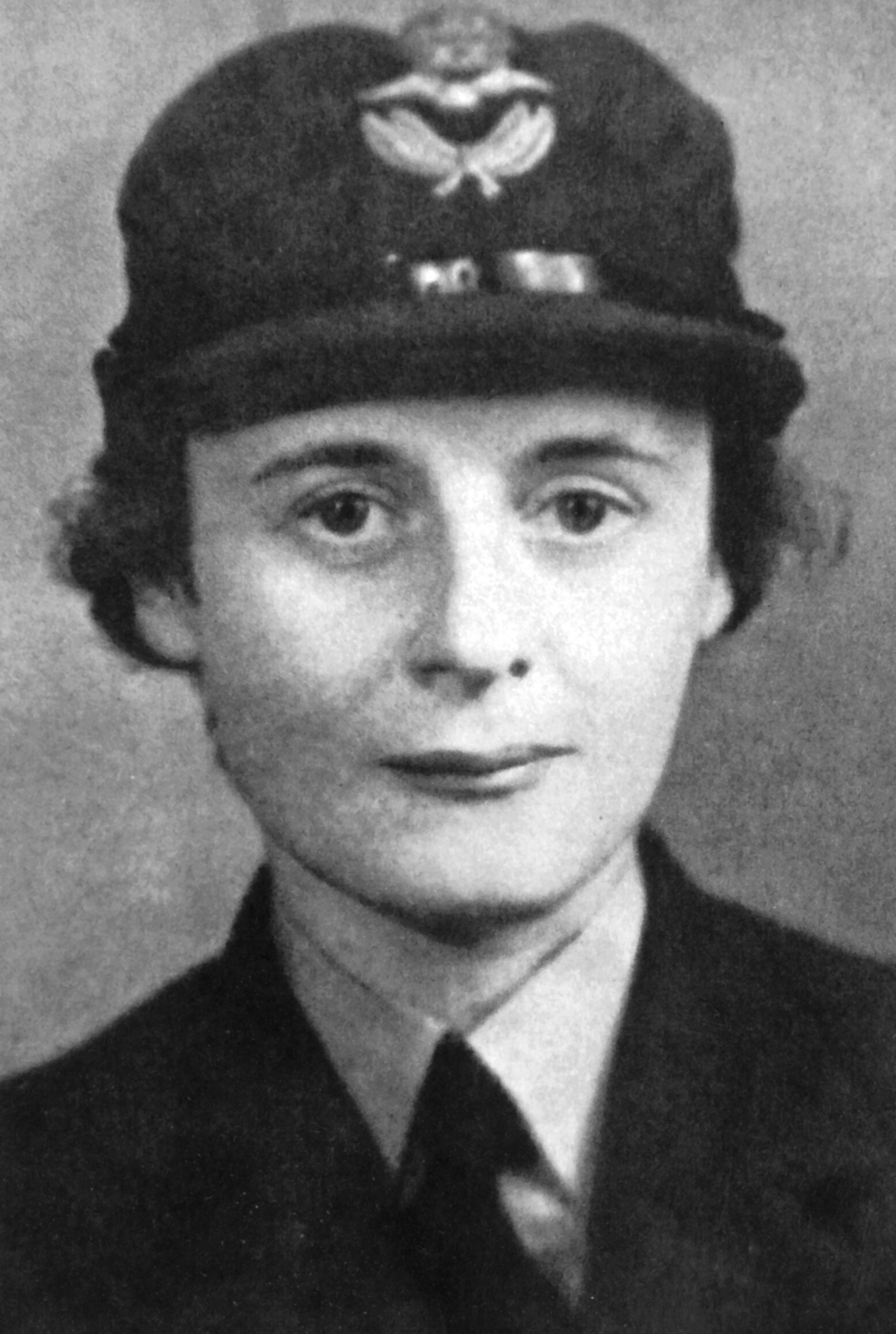
- In WAAF uniform (circa 1942).
- Born: 31 January 1915; England
- Died: 6 July 1944 (aged 29); Natzweiler-Struthof, France
- Military career
- Allegiance: Britain
- Branch: Women's Auxiliary Air Force; Special Operations Executive
- Service years: 1941-1944
- Rank: Section Officer (WAAF)
- Nicknames: Paulette, Chaplain and Marcelle (SOE codenames), Juliette Thérèse Rondeau (alias while working as an SOE agent in France)
- Unit: Acrobat (SOE)
- Conflicts: Second World War
- Awards: Croix de Guerre; Mentioned in Despatches

Diana Hope Rowden (31 January 1915 – 6 July 1944) served in the Women's Auxiliary Air Force and was an agent for the United Kingdom's clandestine Special Operations Executive (SOE) in France during World War II. The purpose of SOE was to recruit resistance groups and supply them with arms and material in order to carry out sabotage against Nazi Germany. From June to November 1943, Rowden was a courier for SOE's Acrobat circuit in occupied France. She was arrested by the Gestapo in November 1943. In May 1944, along with several other captured women agents, she was transported to Natzweiler-Struthof concentration camp in Germany. She was executed there by fatal injection on 6 July 1944.

== Early life ==
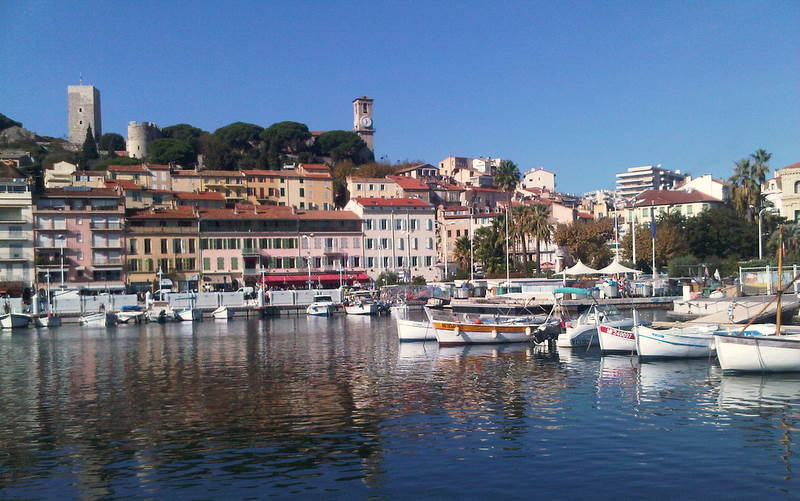
The old harbour in Cannes.

Born in England, Rowden was the daughter of Major Aldred Clement Rowden (British Army) and his wife, Muriel Christian Maitland-Makgill-Crichton, whom he married on 16 July 1913 at St Mark's, North Audley Street in London's fashionable Mayfair district. The marriage was not successful and her parents separated when she was still a young child, whereupon she moved with her mother and two younger brothers, Maurice Edward Alfred and Cecil William Aldred, to southern France as a small income went farther there than in England. She and her brothers spent much of their time there on the beach, fishing and boating, swimming and gliding.

Rowden's cousin, Mark Chetwynd-Stapylton, remembers playing games of hide and seek with the Rowden children when they came to visit and bicycle rides on Berkhamsted Common. Sixty years later he was left with a faint impression of Rowden as "a bit of a tomboy", reddish-haired, freckled, with slightly protruding teeth.

Her mother was apparently an eccentric who was remembered by her nephew (Mark) as "amusing even if possessing a somewhat caustic – and biting – wit and not much worried about what she said and to whom". When living in France Mrs Rowden was known to locals, according to her sister, as "the mad Englishwoman".

Rowden attended schools in Sanremo and Cannes on the French Riviera, but her family soon returned to England, settling at Hadlow Down, near Mayfield, East Sussex, where she continued her education at Manor House School in Limpsfield, Surrey, as Mrs Rowden was, according to her nephew, mindful enough of her parental responsibilities to finish off the haphazard schooling Rowden had in France with a proper English education.

The Manor House was set beneath a low line of hills. A girl who shared a room with Rowden (Elizabeth Nicholas), remembered the place later in terms of "the smell of ink and chalk dust, the lazy drones of bees around the flower beds, goal posts pointing bleak and white towards a winter sky." Elizabeth, who would later write a book about Rowden (Death Be Not Proud), remembered how bitterly Rowden resented the restrictions of life at school. "She was of it, but never part of it. She was", she thought later, "too mature for us. We were still schoolgirls in grubby white blouses concerned with games and feuds and ha-ha jokes. She was already adult, and withdrawn from our diversions; none of us, I think, ever knew her."

Elizabeth was amazed to learn years later from Mrs Rowden about Diana's early years "as a sea urchin", napping on the deck of the Sans Peur with a line tied around her big toe to wake her if a fish bit, gutting her catch "with a cheerful confidence, marketing, carousing, sailing a small boat with reckless skill. "It seemed to Elizabeth that the change in Rowden's personality from spontaneity to reserve was explained by the change of scene to a manor in Surrey where she longed for the life she had led in France, "for the yacht and the sea and the warm sun of the Mediterranean and her raffish, careless, unpredictable companions."

In 1933, when Rowden was considered sufficiently educated, if not entirely finished, she returned to France with her mother (leaving the two boys at school in England) and enrolled at the Sorbonne, and tried her hand at freelance journalism.

== Red Cross to WAAF (1940-43) ==
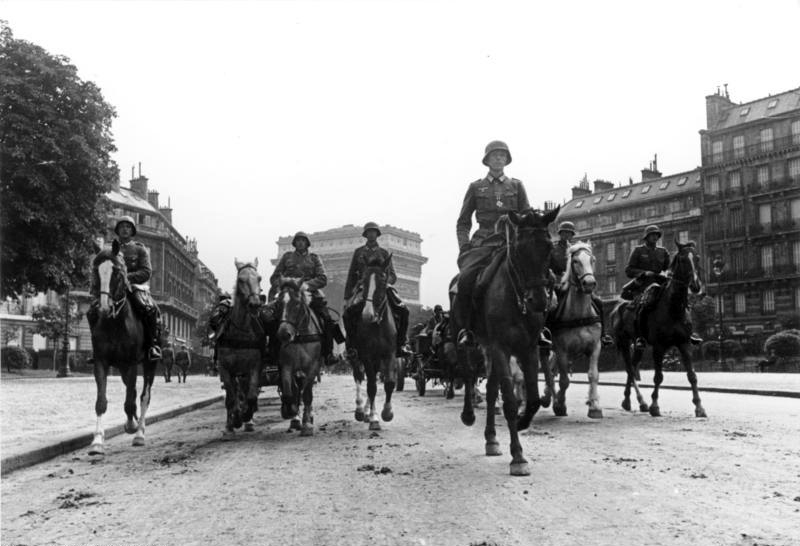
German troops in Paris (1940).

When Germany invaded France in 1940 she volunteered to serve with the French Red Cross, being assigned to the Anglo-American Ambulance Unit. The Allied collapse in May 1940 prevented her evacuation from France and she remained there until the summer of 1941 when she escaped to England via Spain and Portugal.

In September 1941, she joined the Women's Auxiliary Air Force (WAAF), working at the Department of the Chief of Air Staff as Assistant Section Officer for Intelligence duties, before being posted in July 1942 to Moreton-in-Marsh, where she was promoted to Section Officer.

During a brief hospitalisation in the West Country to recuperate from a minor operation, Rowden met a convalescing pilot (Squadron Leader William Simpson) who had been working for the French Section of SOE. She first came to the attention of the Special Operations Executive when Harry Sporborg, a senior SOE staff member, saw her file and requested that she be appointed his secretary, but she had already joined the WAAF and began military training. Simpson worked part-time for SOE and with whom she discussed her desire to return to France and take part in resistance work and caused him to tell some of his colleagues in Baker St (SOE occupied much of the western side of Baker Street, hence the nickname "the Baker Street Irregulars").

== Special Operations Executive (1943-44) ==
In early March 1943, she received an invitation to a preliminary interview with an officer of SOE F Section, during which the interviewer was favourably impressed. It was duly noted that she was "very anxious to return to France and work against the Germans", and after she had been seen by other members of F Section staff, it was decided that she would be given the chance she had been looking for. She was officially posted to Air Intelligence 10, actually seconded to SOE, on 18 March 1943, and immediately sent off to training.

Her training report described her as "not very agile", but with "plenty of courage", and "physically quite fit". One of her best subjects was fieldcraft, in which she "did some excellent stalks". She was "a very good shot, not at all gun-shy. Grenade throwing, very good". Her instructor found her "very conscientious" and "a pleasant student to instruct". Her commandant's report described her as a "strange mixture. Very intelligent in many ways but very slow in learning any new subject". She had trouble with technical details and her signalling was described as a grief to herself and others, not worth while persevering with as it only discourages her. She hates being beaten by any subject, so must have got through a lot of hate down here." He concluded, "I think she has enjoyed the course and could be useful."

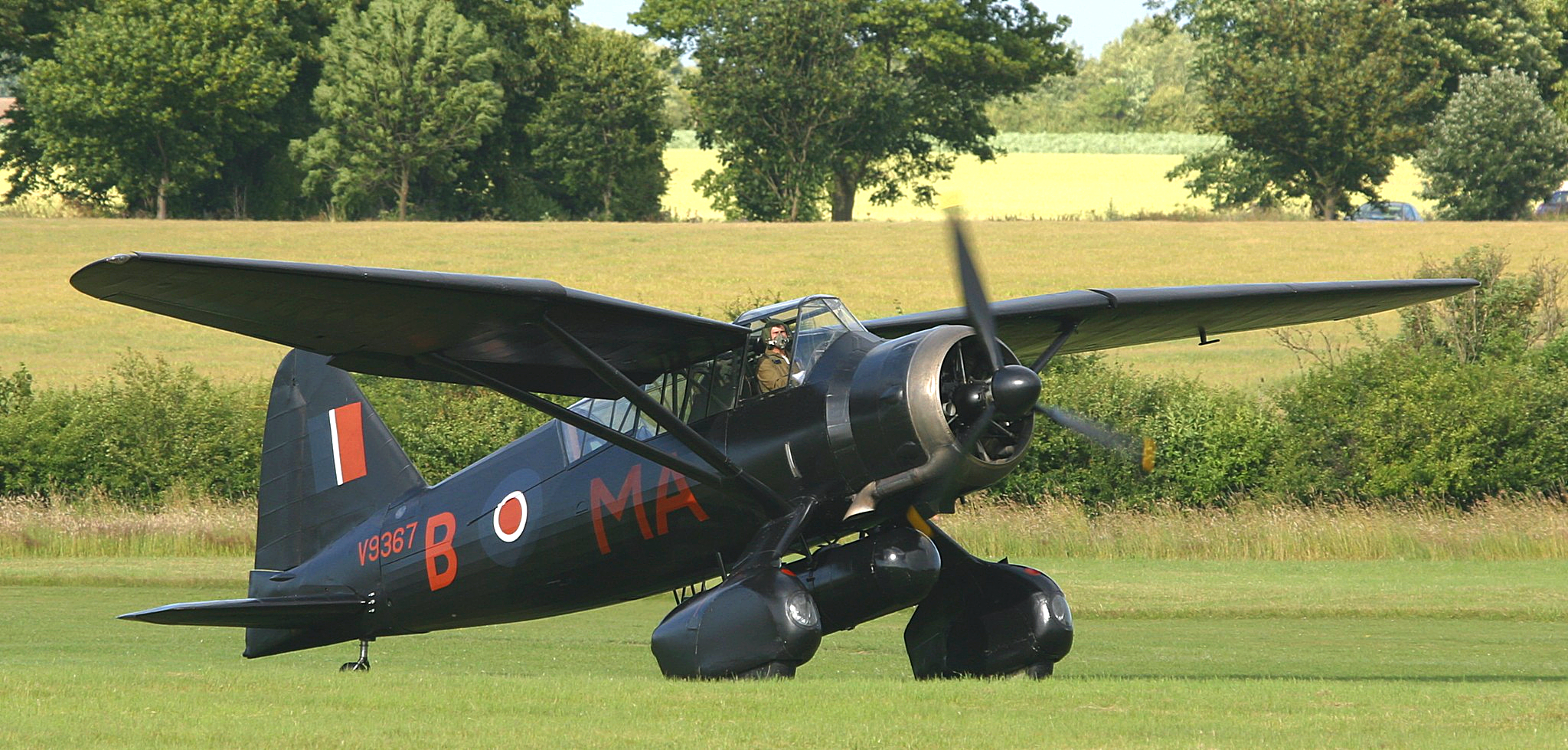
Westland Lysander Mk III (SD), the type used for special missions into occupied France during World War II.

On 9 June 1943, Rowden received orders for her first mission, and a week later, on the night of 16/17 June, she stepped out of a Lysander on a moonlit meadow in the Loire Valley a few miles north-east of Angers. Within minutes two other agents, Cecily Lefort and Noor Inayat Khan, had landed. The three women, who had been sent to operate as couriers for the organizers of various circuits (also known as networks) in different parts of France, were met by a reception committee organized by F Sections' air movements officer, Henri Déricourt, and quickly spirited to their destinations. Rowden was bound to the area of the Jura Mountains south-east of Dijon and just west of the Swiss border to work for the organizer of the Acrobat circuit, led by John Renshaw Starr. Her papers were in her cover name of Juliette Thérèse Rondeau. Her name in the field among fellow agents was Paulette while her code name in messages to London was Chaplain. She lived in a small room at the back of the Hôtel du Commerce with access to a roof if she had to leave in a hurry without being seen.

Her primary job was acting as a courier delivering messages to other agents and members of the underground, and she would travel constantly, mostly by bicycle over the neighbouring roads bordering the Pines, but would also deliver instructions to agents as far afield as Marseille, Lyon, Besançon, Montbéliard, and even Paris, and bring their messages back to the W/T operator (John Young) for transmission. Young was a Scotsman who spoke poor French, so Rowden's duties included escorting him around so he would not have to speak French. On one of her trips to Marseille the German police boarded the train and began inspecting identity papers, so she locked herself in the watercloset until they had passed through her car. Rowden got to know the local maquis who described her as without fear – sans peur.

She went out at night to meet local members of the resistance in the moonlit fields, setting flares and shining flashlights to guide in the planes with parachute drops of arms, ammunition and explosives. Some of these explosives were used to sabotage the Peugeot factory at Sochaux, near the town of Montbéliard, which had been turning out tank turrets for the Wehrmacht and engine parts for the Luftwaffe. A raid by Allied bombers had failed to damage the factory and caused hundreds of civilian deaths in the town, so Harry Rée (an SOE agent known as César) approached the local director of the factory (a Peugeot family member) and convinced him to facilitate sabotage at the factory as the alternative was another bombing raid that could cause many more deaths.

Barely a month after her arrival, Starr was arrested, betrayed by a double agent who had infiltrated the circuit, so Young and Rowden were on the run. Rowden briefly sheltered in a little bistro and shop at Epy. After three weeks at Epy she joined Young in what would be their last hideout thanks to the help of the Janier-Dubry family, which consisted of an elderly widow and her son and daughter-in-law of the family name, and her two daughters and their husbands, the Juifs and the Paulis. Together they owned a local sawmill outside Clairvaux-les-Lacs, a village about 15 kilometres from the town of Lons-le-Saunier. In August Rowden and Young were established in the house of the Juifs.

Since her description had likely been distributed, Rowden dyed her hair and changed the way she wore it, got rid of the clothes she had been wearing and borrowed some others. She also dropped the codename Paulette and assumed the name Marcelle. She helped around the house while the Juif children loved her as she joined in their games and went tobogganing with them down the log slide outside the house, and to Madame Juif she seemed as tough as a man and as tireless as a child.

== Arrest and execution ==
=== Feldgendarmerie raid ===
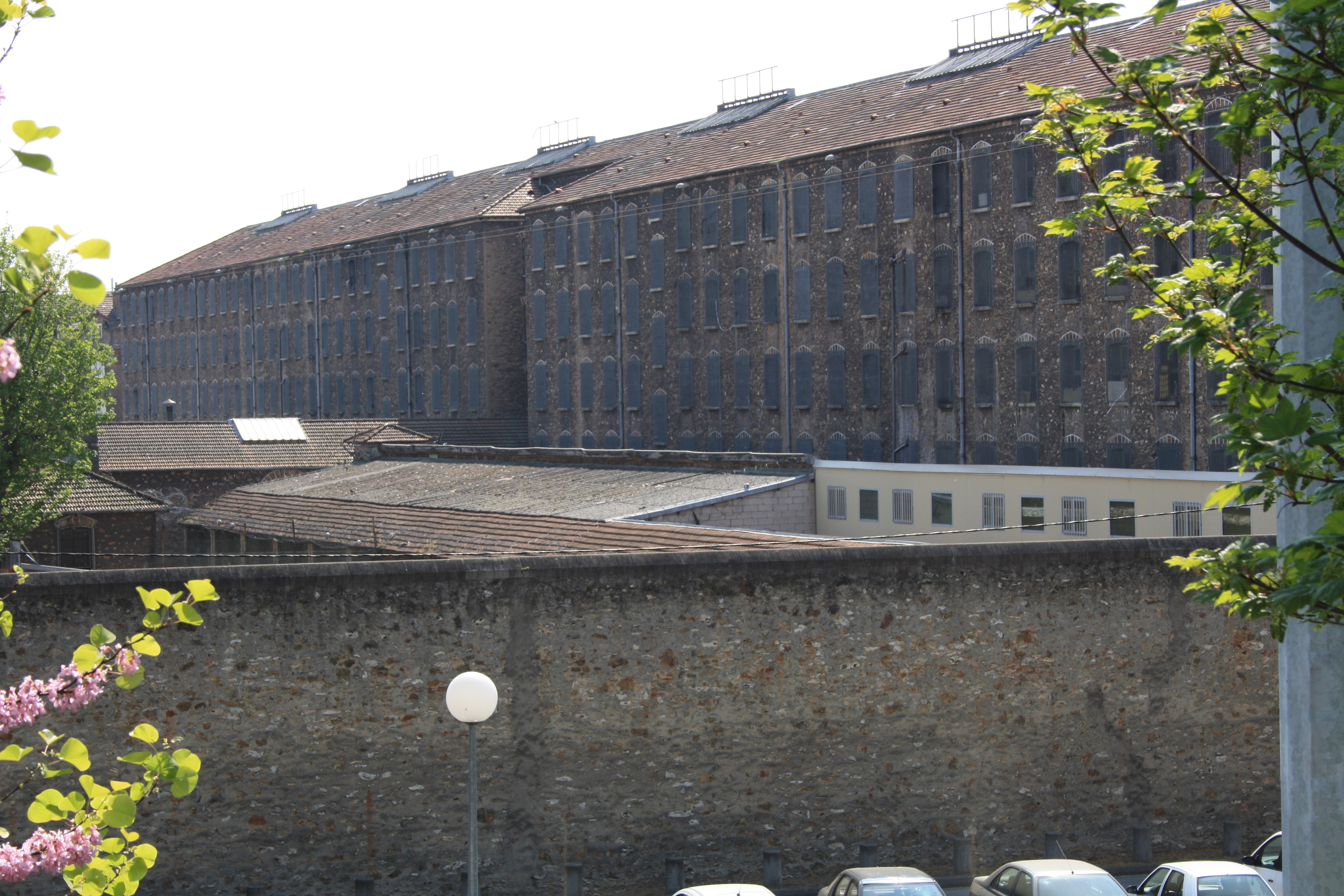
Fresnes Prison

In November, Young received a message that a new agent named Benoit would arrive. Benoit arrived at a nearby house and identified himself, after which M. Janier-Dubry drove him to Lons-le-Saunier to retrieve a suitcase and were accompanied by Rowden. In Lons they met Henri Clerk a résistant from St Amour, and had a drink with him at the Café Strasbourg, one of the circuit's mail drops. They returned around six that evening and were chatting with Madame Juif, who was cooking dinner, when the door burst open and the room was filled with Feldgendarmerie, the German military police, armed with machine guns.

Rowden, Young and Benoit were handcuffed and taken to Lons, though the false Benoit as he later came to be known returned with some of the Germans and confronted the family at gunpoint and demanded that they hand over the wireless set and crystals, at one point firing into the walls as the Germans searched the home but found nothing. The wireless set had been hidden by Young and later taken away by a local résistant, while Madame Juif had taken a radio crystal from Young's raincoat hanging behind the door and slipped it under the mattress of the baby's crib when no-one was looking. Benoit and the Germans left after looting the home of valuables and took Madame Pauly with them, who returned after the war after having been imprisoned in Ravensbrück.

When the war ended the Janier-Dubry family expected to see Rowden again or at least to write, but they never heard from her again. Rowden liked to say that after the war she would return in her uniform and in a big American car and, instead of the laborious climb to the château on foot, they would shoot up the hill like a rocket.

From Lons, Rowden had been taken to Paris the next day and remained at Gestapo headquarters in the Avenue Foch for two weeks and, on 5 December 1943, was placed in a cell in the women's division of Fresnes Prison, the grey fortress-like penitentiary a few miles south of Paris.

=== Moved to Germany ===
On 13 May 1944, Rowden, together with three other captured female SOE agents, Andrée Borrel, Vera Leigh and Sonia Olschanezky, were moved from Fresnes to the Avenue Foch along with four other women whose names were Yolande Beekman, Madeleine Damerment, Eliane Plewman and Odette Sansom, all of whom were F Section agents. Later that day they were taken to the railway station, and each handcuffed to a guard upon alighting the train. Sansom, in an interview after the war, said:

We were starting on this journey together in fear, but all of us hoping for something above all that we would remain together. We had all had a taste already of what things could be like, none of us did expect for anything very much, we all knew that they could put us to death. I was the only one officially condemned to death. The others were not. But there is always a fugitive ray of hope that some miracle will take place.

When the women arrived in Germany, they were put into separate cells in the prison in Karlsruhe (Justizvollzugsanstalt Karlsruhe) – Sansom with a woman who had been in prison for three years because her own daughter (a member of the Hitlerjugend) had denounced her for listening to the BBC, and Jehovah's Witnesses. The agents were treated no differently from other prisoners – markedly better than those in concentration camps – and were given manual work to do, peeling potatoes, sewing, etc. Occasionally, through the bars, they could hear Allied bombers headed for targets within Germany, so while they were nearing freedom, there was the possibility of dying in an air raid. The war was coming closer to an end and they could expect to be liberated by the Allies before too long.

=== Execution at Natzweiler-Struthof ===
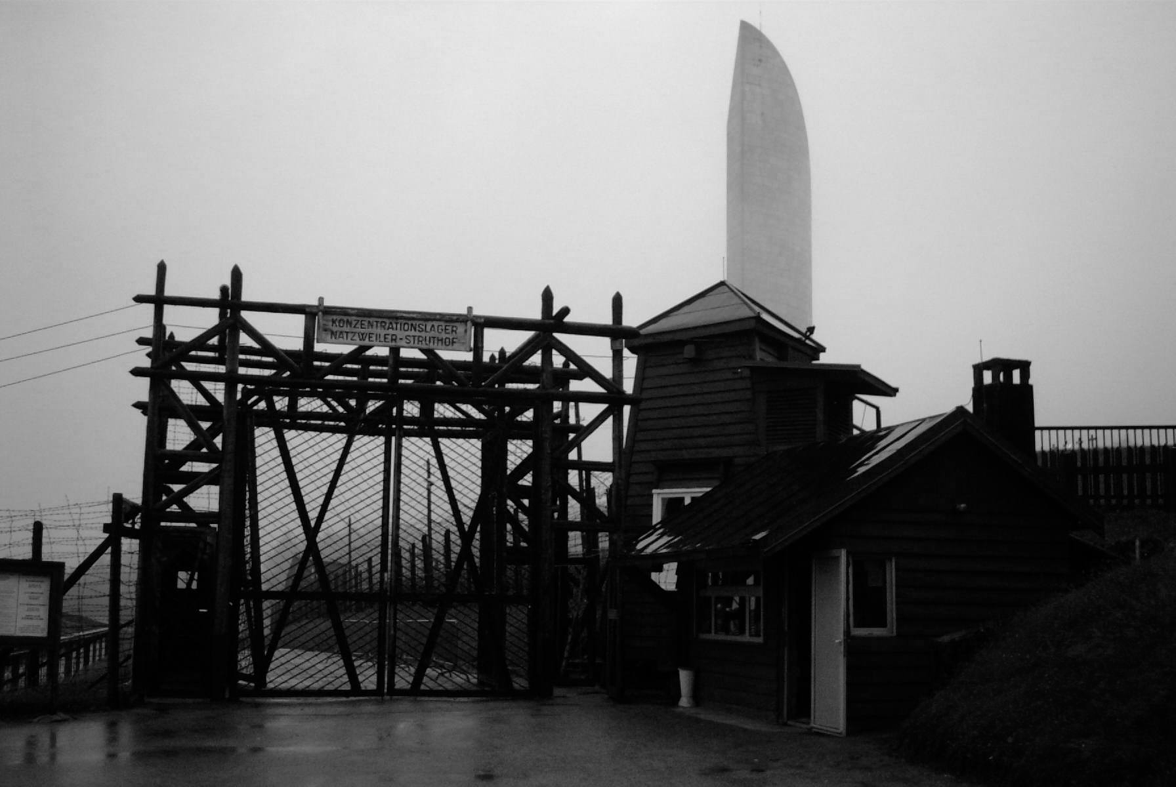
Natzweiler-Struthof camp entrance. Monument to the Departed in background.

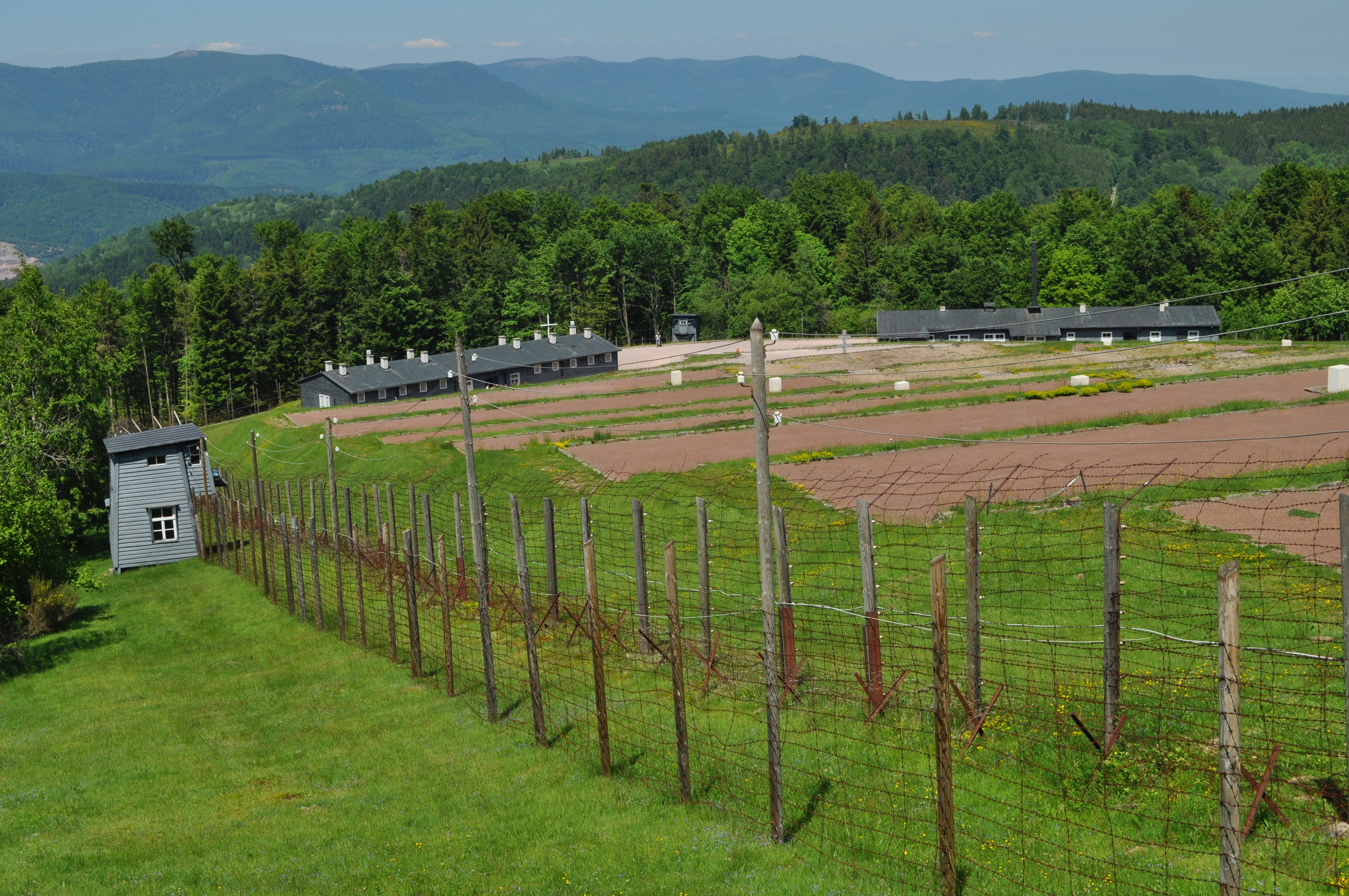
View of former Natzweiler-Struthof Concentration Camp in 2010. The cellblock is the building on the left and the crematorium is the building on the right.

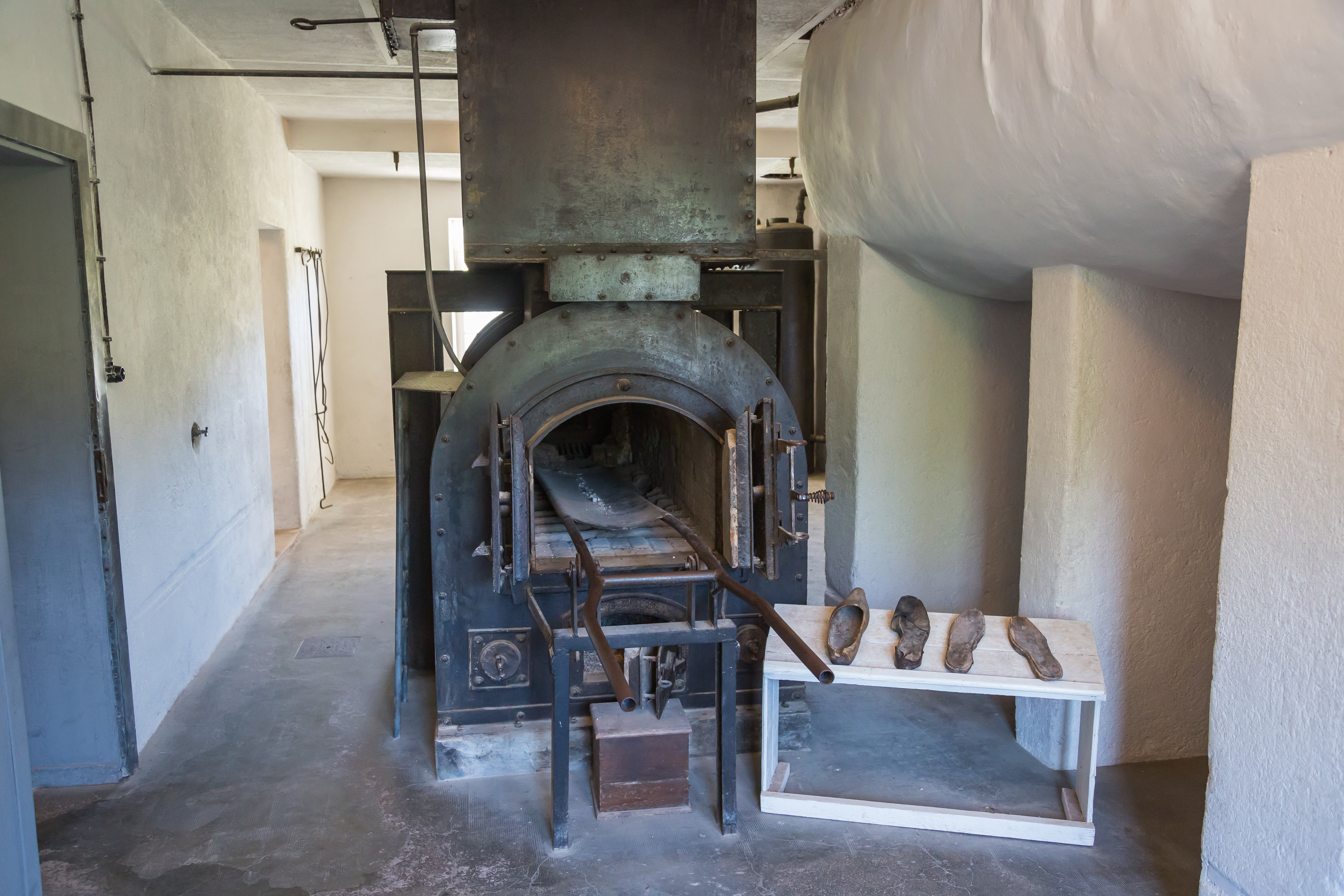
The crematorium at Natzweiler-Struthof

Some time between five and six in the morning on 6 July 1944, not quite two months after their arrival in Karlsruhe, Borrel, Leigh, Olschanezky and Rowden were taken to the reception room, given their personal possessions, and handed over to two Gestapo men who then escorted them 100 kilometres south-west by closed truck to the Natzweiler-Struthof concentration camp in France, where they arrived around three-thirty in the afternoon. The women's arrival was apparently unexpected, as was the order by one of the women's escorts that the four women were to be executed immediately.

As women were a rarity in the camp their presence immediately attracted attention from both German guards and prisoners. The four women were led through the center of the camp down to the cellblock at the bottom of the camp by SS men and held there until later that night. "One could see from their appearance that they hadn't come from a camp," said a French prisoner. "They seemed young, they were fairly well groomed, their clothes were not rubbish, their hair was brushed, and each had a case in their (sic) hand."

The four women were initially together but later put into individual cells. Through the windows, which faced those of the infirmary, they managed to communicate with several prisoners, including a Belgian prisoner, Dr Georges Boogaerts, who passed one of the women (whom he later identified as Borrel from a photograph) cigarettes through the window. Borrel threw him a little tobacco pouch containing some money.

Albert Guérisse, a Belgian army physician who had headed the Pat O'Leary escape line in Marseille, recognized Borrel as one of his former helpers. He exchanged a few words with another of the women, who said she was English (Leigh or Rowden) before she disappeared into the cellblock building. At the post-war trial of the men charged with the execution of the four women, Guérisse stated that he was in the infirmary and had seen the women, one by one, being escorted by SS guards from the cellblock (Zellenbau) to the crematorium a few yards away. He told the court: "I saw the four women going to the crematorium, one after the other. One went, and two or three minutes later another went."

Inside the building housing the crematorium, each woman in turn was told to undress for a medical check and a doctor gave her an injection for what he told one of them was a vaccination against typhus, but was in fact a 10 cc dose of phenol which the doctor believed was lethal. When the woman became unconscious after the injection, she was inserted into the crematorium oven. Guérrise said, "The next morning the German prisoner in charge of the crematorium explained to me that each time the door of the oven was opened, the flames came out of the chimney and that meant a body had been put in the oven. I saw the flames four times." The door was locked from the outside during the executions, but it was possible to see the corridor from a small window above the door, so the prisoner in the highest bunk was able to keep up a running commentary on what he saw.

The prisoner Guérisse referred to was Franz Berg, who assisted in the crematorium and had stoked the fire that night before being sent back to the room he shared with two other prisoners before the executions. Berg said:

We heard low voices in the next room and then the noise of a body being dragged along the floor, and he whispered to me that he could see people dragging something along the floor which was below his angle of vision through the fanlight.

At the same time that this body was being brought past we heard the noise of heavy breathing and low groaning combined.

…and again we heard the same noises and regular groans as the [next two] insensible women were dragged away.

The fourth, however, resisted in the corridor. I heard her say "Pourquoi?" and I heard a voice as I recognized as the doctor who was in civilian clothes say "Pour typhus". We then heard the noise of a struggle and the muffled cries of the woman. I assumed that someone held a hand over her mouth. I heard the woman being dragged away too. She was groaning louder than the others.

From the noise of the crematorium oven doors which I heard, I can state definitely that in each case the groaning women were placed immediately in the crematorium oven.

When [the officials] had gone, we went to the crematorium oven, opened the door and saw that there were four blackened bodies within. Next morning in the course of my duties I had to clear the ashes out of the crematorium oven. I found a pink woman's stocking garter on the floor near the oven.

More than one witness talked of a struggle when the fourth woman was shoved into the furnace. According to a Polish prisoner named Walter Schultz, the SS medical orderly (Emil Brüttel) told him the following: "When the last woman was halfway in the oven (she had been put in feet first), she had come to her senses and struggled. As there were sufficient men there, they were able to push her into the oven, but not before she had resisted and scratched [Peter] Straub's face." The next day Schultz noticed that the face of the camp executioner (Straub) had been severely scratched.

The camp doctor (Werner Rohde) was executed after the war. Franz Berg was sentenced to five years in prison and Straub to 13 but both received the death penalty in another trial for a different crime and were hanged on the same day as Rohde. The camp commandant (Fritz Hartjenstein) received a life sentence; he was later sentenced to death in France and died awaiting execution.

== Awards and honours ==
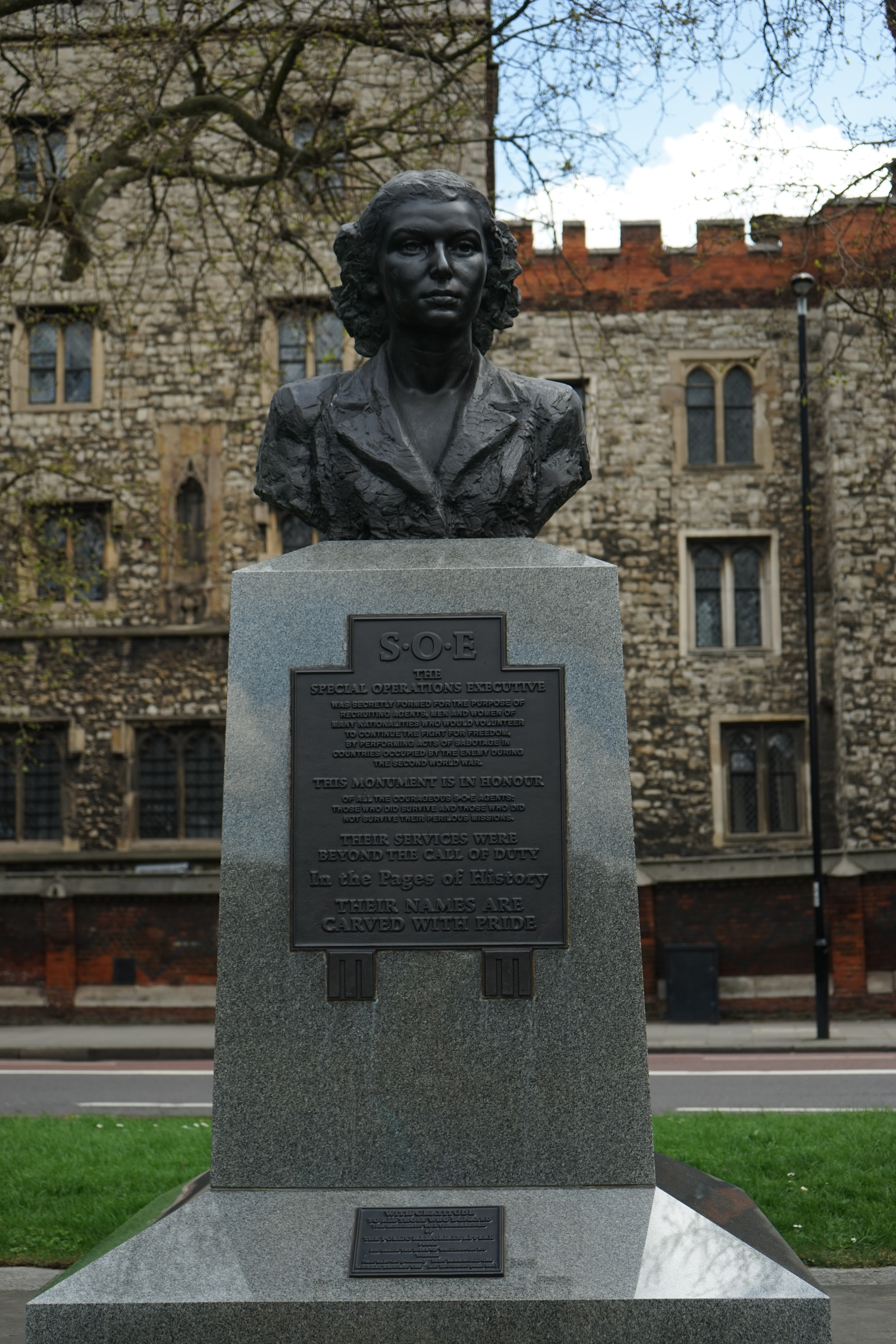
SOE Agents Memorial

Posthumously, Rowden was appointed a MBE (later withdrawn due to the policy on posthumous awards of this order) and Mentioned in Despatches by the British government, and awarded the Croix de Guerre 1939–1945 by the French government.

Her name is registered with the Scottish National War Memorial in Edinburgh Castle, at the Runnymede Memorial in Surrey, England, on the FANY memorial at St Paul's Knightsbridge, London, on the "Roll of Honour" on the Valençay SOE Memorial in the town of Valençay, in the Indre département of France, and on the "Roll of Honour" in Limpsfield, Surrey. She is also commemorated on the Tempsford Memorial in the village of Tempsford in the county of Bedfordshire in the East of England and on the town war memorial in Moreton-in-Marsh. A later memorial, the SOE Agents Memorial in Lambeth Palace Road (Westminster, London), is dedicated to all SOE agents.

The concentration camp where she died is now a French government historical site: a plaque to Rowden and the three women who died with her is part of the Deportation Memorial on the site. In 1985, SOE agent and painter Brian Stonehouse, who saw Rowden and the other female SOE agents at the Natzweiler-Struthof concentration camp just before their deaths, painted a watercolour of the four women which now hangs in the Special Forces Club in London.

== Related cultural works ==
- Carve Her Name with Pride (1958)

Movie based on the book by R.J. Minney about Violette Szabo, starring Paul Scofield and Virginia McKenna.

- Churchill's Spy School (2010)

Documentary about the SOE "finishing school" on the Beaulieu estate in Hampshire.

- Les Femmes de l'Ombre (aka Female Agents) (2008)

French film about five SOE female agents and their contribution towards the D-Day invasions.

- Nancy Wake Codename: The White Mouse (1987)

Docudrama about Nancy Wake's work for SOE, partly narrated by Wake (Wake was disappointed that the film was changed from an 8-hour resistance story to a 4-hour love story).

- Now It Can Be Told (aka School for Danger) (1946)

Filming began in 1944 and starred real-life SOE agents Captain Harry Rée and Jacqueline Nearne codenamed "Felix" and "Cat", respectively. The film tells the story of the training of agents for SOE and their operations in France. The training sequences were filmed using the SOE equipment at the training schools at Traigh and Garramor (South Morar) and at Ringway.

- Odette (1950)

Movie based on the book by Jerrard Tickell about Odette Sansom, starring Anna Neagle and Trevor Howard. The film includes an interview with Maurice Buckmaster, head of SOE's F-Section.

- Robert and the Shadows (2004)

French documentary on France Télévisions. Did General De Gaulle tell the whole truth about the French resistance? This is the purpose of this documentary. Jean Marie Barrere, the French director, uses the story of his own grandfather (Robert) to tell the French what SOE did at that time. Robert was a French teacher based in the southwest of France, who worked with SOE agent George Reginald Starr (codenamed "Hilaire", in charge of the "Wheelwright" circuit).

- Wish Me Luck (1987)

Television series that was broadcast between 1987 and 1990 featuring the exploits of the women and, less frequently, the men of SOE, which was renamed the "Outfit".

== See also ==
- British military history of World War II
- Military history of France during World War II
- Resistance during World War II
