= Andrée Borrel =

French espionage agent (1919-1944)

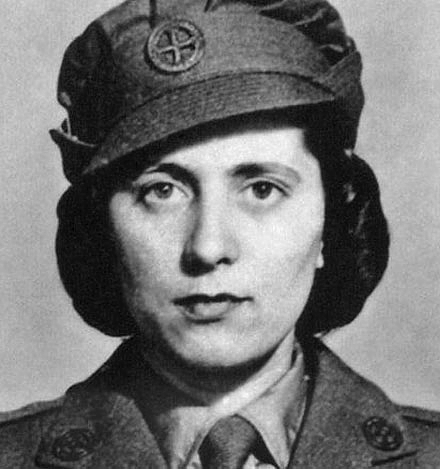
- Borrel in 1942 after joining SOE. "A truly dreadful photograph," said author Elizabeth Nicholas, of a "delightful girl."
- Born: 18 November 1919; Bécon-les-Bruyères, France
- Died: 6 July 1944 (aged 24); Natzweiler-Struthof, France
- Military career
- Allegiance: France, Britain
- Branch: French Resistance; Special Operations Executive
- Service years: 1942–1944 (SOE)
- Rank: Lieutenant (nominally for FANY while actually an SOE agent)
- Nicknames: Monique (SOE codename for the Whitebeam operation and subsequent work in France), Denise Urbain (alias while working as an SOE agent in France)
- Units: Prosper (SOE)
- Conflicts: Second World War
- Awards: Croix de Guerre; Médaille de la Résistance; KCBC

Andrée Raymonde Borrel (18 November 1919 – 6 July 1944), code named Denise, was a French woman who served in the French Resistance and as an agent for Britain's clandestine Special Operations Executive in World War II. The purpose of SOE was to conduct espionage, sabotage, and reconnaissance in occupied Europe against the Axis powers, especially Nazi Germany. SOE agents allied themselves with resistance groups and supplied them with weapons and equipment parachuted in from England.

Described by author Elizabeth Nicholas as a "towering figure" in the French Resistance, in September 1942, Borrel, joined by Lise de Baissac were the first female agents of SOE to arrive in France by parachute, which also made her the first female secret agent known to have parachuted into enemy territory. Based in Paris, she became a member of the SOE's Prosper network (also called "circuit" and "reseau) in occupied France. She worked as a courier. Prosper was SOE's largest and most important network in France and Borrel was an important figure in its leadership. She was arrested by the Gestapo in June 1943. She was subsequently executed in July 1944 at the Natzweiler-Struthof concentration camp.

== Early life ==
Andrée Borrel was born into a working-class family in Bécon-les-Bruyères, a north-western suburb of Paris, France. She was good at sports, while her older sister (Léone) described Borrel as a tom-boy who had the strength, endurance and interests of a boy and whose favourite pastimes were bicycling in the countryside, hiking and climbing.

Her father (Louis) died when she was 11, and to help support her family Borrel left school at 14 to work for a dress designer. When she was 16, her family moved to Paris, where Borrel spent two years as a shop assistant in Boulangerie Pajo, a bakery. After this she worked at the Bazar d'Amsterdam as a shop assistant which allowed her to have Sundays off so she could enjoy her passion for cycling. In October 1939, Borrel's mother (Eugenie) was advised to move to a warmer climate for her health, so took Andrée and her sister to Toulon on the Mediterranean coast where they had family friends.

Not long before World War II broke out, Borrel's socialist sympathies led her to travel to Spain to help the Republican government in its fight against the Nazi-backed fascists in Spain. However, she found that the war had all but been lost, and returned to France.

== War work in Europe (1939–42) ==
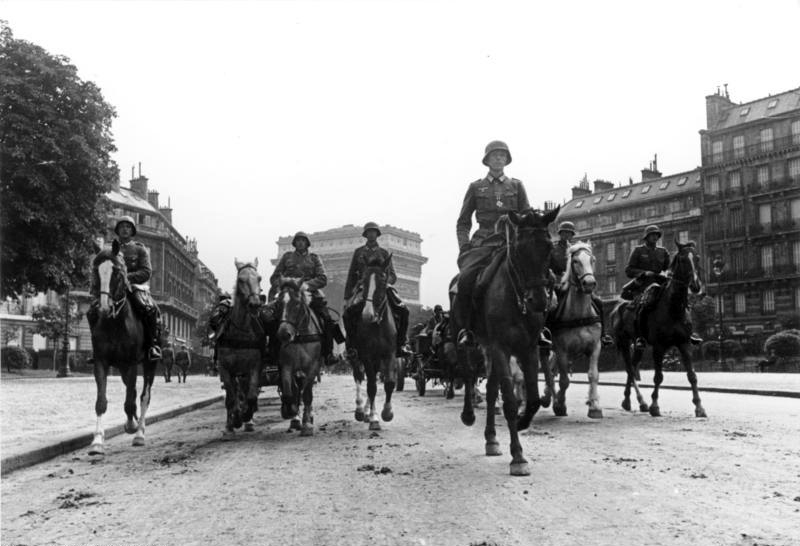
German troops in Paris (1940).

When World War II broke out Borrel went to work with the Red Cross to volunteer her services. She enrolled in a crash course in nursing that she completed on 20 January 1940, which qualified her to serve as a nurse in the Association des Dames Françaises. First at Hôpital Compliméntaire in Nîmes in early February, though Borrel was sent back 15 days later following a decree that nurses under the age of 21 were not allowed to serve in hospitals. This decree was revoked a few days later and she was sent to the Hôpital de Beaucaire in Beaucaire. One of Borrel's co-workers there was Lieutenant Maurice Dufour, and when the hospital was closed they were both sent to Hôpital Compliméntaire. Towards the end of July that hospital was to be closed and, at the request of Dufour, Borrel was allowed to resign from this quasi-military institution, after which she immediately went to work with Dufour for the Pat Line, an underground organisation which Dufour was involved in.

At the beginning of August 1941, Borrel and Dufour established the Villa Rene-Therese in Canet-plage, on the Mediterranean coast just outside Perpignan near the Spanish border. This became the Pat Line's last safe house (before the hard and dangerous route over the Pyrénées), an escape network established by Albert Guérisse (supported by MI9), which helped British airmen shot down over France, SOE agents, Jews and others escape German controlled France. The villa proved too small and at the beginning of October they rented the Villa Anita. Toward the end of December the escape network had been compromised by the Germans. Borrel and Dufour found other accommodation to avoid arrest until eventually escaping over the Pyrénées in mid-February to Spain and from there to Portugal, where they flew to England (Dufour on 29 March 1942 and Borrel on 24 April 1942).

== Arrival in England ==
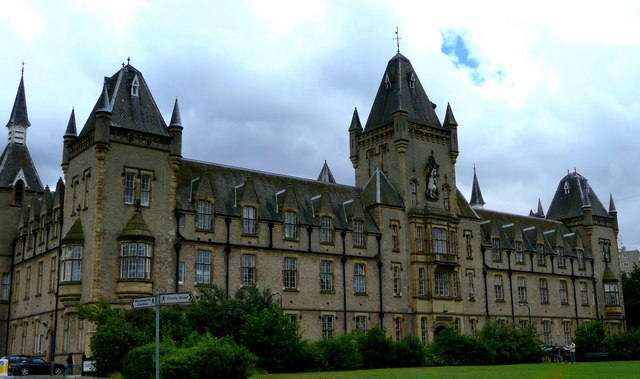
Royal Victoria Patriotic Building

Soon after landing in England, like all arrivals from the Continent, Borrel was taken to the Royal Patriotic School, the MI5 security clearance centre. Their report concluded:

Mlle Borrel's story seems perfectly straightforward. It is corroborated by Dufour who, on arriving in England, vouched for her. She is an excellent type of country girl, who has intelligence and seems a keen patriot. From a security point of view, I can find nothing against Mlle Borrel and recommend her release to the FFF.

Borrel had wanted to join the Free French Forces but they were not enthusiastic about French citizens who had worked with the British (who were deeply involved in the escape network Borrel had been working with), and were not interested in Borrel as she refused to divulge information about all her prior activities. Borrel was subsequently approached by the Special Operations Executive and joined it on 15 May 1942.

== Special Operations Executive (1942–44) ==
=== SOE training ===
Borrel seemed like just the type of woman SOE needed for a field agent. Her SOE interviewer commented:

Since arriving in London, she attempted to join the Corps Féminin of the Free French movement but they have made it a condition that she should give them all the intelligence concerning the organization for which she was working in France. This she refuses to do and apparently they refuse to employ her unless she does. I think that she would make an excellent addition to our own Corps Féminin and it should not be difficult to get her… She said that she was perfectly willing to let us have the information she refuses to give to the Free French.

Borrel undertook training with SOE to become a field agent with their F Section while officially an ensign in the First Aid Nursing Yeomanry (FANY). Upon the successful completion of her training, she was promoted to lieutenant. The commandant's report contained the following appraisal:

Of sound intelligence, if lacking somewhat in imagination. She has little organising ability and will do her best work under definite instructions. She is thoroughly tough and self-reliant with no nerves. Has plenty of common sense and is well able to look after herself in any circumstances and she is absolutely reliable. Has lost her attitude of over-confidence and has benefited enormously from the course and developed a thoroughly level headed approach towards problems. A very pleasant personality and she should eventually develop into a first class agent.

The men she trained with found her "informal by habit, lower-class, and scrappy." She was said to be "accessible, playful, easy to like, easy to share a smoke and a laugh with, but innocent too, neither hardened nor hurt by the rough wear of war." One of her fellow agents recounted that she said she would kill a German when he was asleep by stabbing a pencil in his ear. The agent said he "had little doubt that she meant what she said."

=== Parachuted into France ===
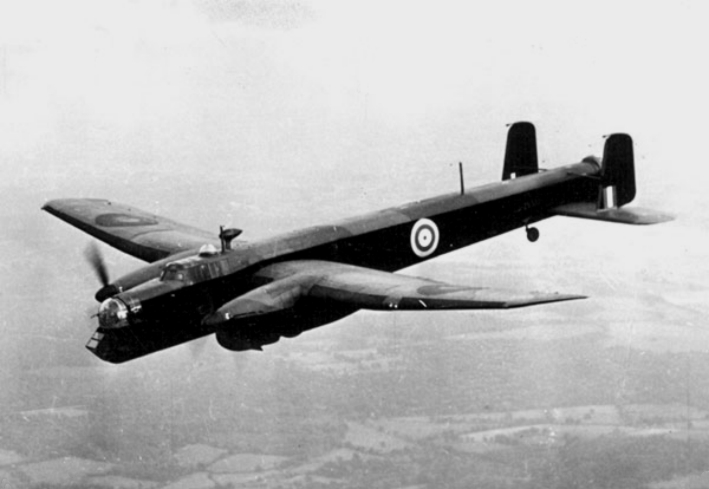
Armstrong Whitworth Whitley in flight c1940.

On the night of 24 September 1942 (the night after their parachute drop was aborted due to the signals in the drop zone being incorrect), Borrel ("Denise") and Lise de Baissac ("Odile") left England in an RAF Whitley and become the first female SOE agents to parachute into German-occupied France early on the morning of 25 September, as part of operation "Whitebeam" to set up resistance networks in Paris and Northern France (circuits and sub-circuits). They were flown in from RAF Tempsford. Borrel dropped first, while they both landed in a field in the village of Saint-Laurent-Nouan, not far from the river Loire, about 160 km (99 miles) southeast of Paris, and were picked up by members of a local resistance team. Years later de Baissac recalled the experience:

As it happens, we went twice. The pilot wouldn't drop us the first time because the lights of the landing field were not quite accurate, so we had to come all the way back, which was very trying. You were squashed in that little place with a parachute on your back and your legs drawn up, and, of course, there was the danger too. Back in England they told us the reception committee had a man missing so they couldn't place the lights for the signal the way they were supposed to. We went back again the next night. We sat on the floor of the airplane [a Whitley bomber], much too tense for conversation, which in any case was not possible because of the noise. I don't remember how long it was until the dispatcher opened the hole, which meant we were arriving. We crept nearer, getting our legs into position. We had drawn straws and luck gave Andrée the first jump. I went immediately after her. You had to jump very quickly, one right after the other, because the plane is going on and you might be dropped very far from each other.

=== Physician (Prosper) circuit ===
Because of Borrel's familiarity with Paris, it was natural that she be sent there to work as a courier for the new "Prosper" circuit to be led by Francis Suttill (officially named "Physician" but unofficially called "Prosper" after Suttill's codename). In early October 1942, Suttill and Borrel met in a Paris cafe she knew. With information supplied them by Germaine Tambour of the Carte network, Suttill and Borrell embarked on a tour of northern France to begin creating and organizing groups to resist the German occupation. They had early success and on 17/18 November Suttill, Borrel, Yvonne Rudellat, and newly-arrived wireless operator, Gilbert Norman, received near Étrépagny a parachute drop of CLE Canisters with weapons for the resistance. It was the first of many over the next few months.

Suttill initially did not wish to have Borrel work with him because "as a married man" he "might find the enforced proximity a strain." However, SOE insisted she was the best person to serve as his courier. She became more than that. Suttill's French was not flawless and Borrel accompanied him everywhere on their tour, posing as his sister and doing most of the talking. The two of them had cover stories as salesmen for agricultural products. They had success in finding many recruits for resistance groups and farm fields suitable for clandestine landings of airplanes and drops of containers of arms. Borrel, Suttill, and the radio operator, Gilbert Norman, became an inseparable trio. Borrel and Norman became lovers. They were a pair in contrast. He was handsome, "upper-caste", and rich. She was "shrewd and common". Whilst working in Prosper she took part in a wide range of activities including the creation of circuits in Paris and northern France, sabotage, weapons training, and supervising weapons drops. Suttill was impressed with Borrel's performance. In a note to SOE in March 1943, Suttill wrote:

Everyone who has come into contact with her in her work agrees with myself that she is the best of us all. In J…'s absence, she acted as my Lieutenant. Shared every danger. Took part in a December reception committee with myself and some others. Has a perfect understanding of security and an imperturbable calmness. Thank you very much for having sent her to me.

Contrary to Suttill's opinion, Borrel's frequent poker games with other SOE agents in a Paris cafe violated SOE's doctrine that for security reasons networks should be independent of each other with as little contact as possible between and among networks and even among members of the same network.

Madam Guépin, the wife of George Darling (who ran a resistance group in north-west France), said Borrel "Had a head on her shoulders and a will of iron", and was "utterly loyal and devoted to Prosper [Suttill], as her chief, and to Archambaud (Gilbert Norman)."

== Arrest and execution ==
=== Problems of success ===
The Prosper network grew rapidly, and, in the words of M.R.D. Foot, "its growth made catastrophe certain." The German occupiers were paying attention. In November 1942, a German agent stole a list of the names of more than 200 supporters of the resistance group called the Carte network. Prosper engaged many of the same people on the list in building its resistance networks. The Germans did not take immediate action to suppress the resistors, but bided their time. The rapid growth of Prosper and the large number of people associated with the network, including nearly 30 SOE agents sent from Britain, resulted in loose security. At least 10 SOE agents used the apartment of Geraldine Tambour as a safe house and letter drop, violating SOE doctrine to avoid face-to-face contact among agents. One radio operator, Jack Agazarian, claimed to have transmitted messages for 24 different agents, again violating SOE doctrine. SOE agents in groups frequented restaurants specializing in black market luxuries. Moreover, a double agent, Henri Déricourt, was providing information to the Germans about Prosper.

=== Gestapo raid ===
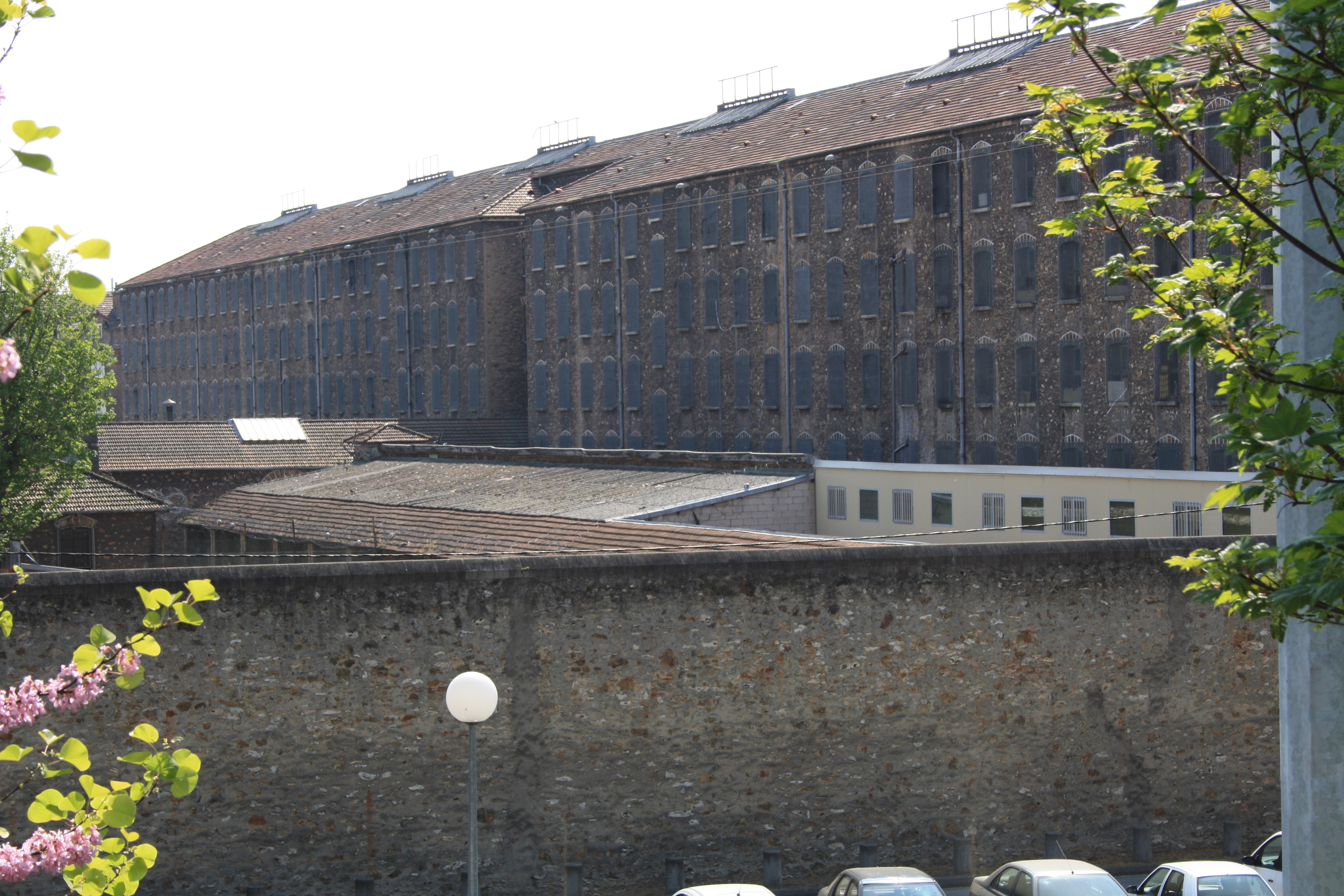
Fresnes Prison

German suppression of Prosper began in April 1943. On 23 and 24 June 1943, the Sicherheitsdienst, the intelligence agency of the SS based at 84 Avenue Foch in Paris and headed by Major Josef Kieffer, struck at Prosper's leadership. Borrel, Norman, and Suttill were arrested. Hundreds of others, including both French helpers and SOE agents, were also arrested in the ensuing months. Borrel was interrogated, but according to one author exhibited a fearless contempt for her captors, maintaining "a silence so disdainful that the Germans did not attempt to break it." Later transferred to the Fresnes Prison, Borrel smuggled out notes to her mother written on cigarette paper hidden in lingerie she sent her sister for washing. Most messages were to reassure her mother and request items like a notebook and hairpins, ending with many kisses. Borrel's mother and sister lived in Paris.

=== Moved to Germany ===
On 13 May 1944, Borrel along with three other captured female SOE agents, Vera Leigh, Sonia Olschanezky and Diana Rowden, were moved from Fresnes to 84 Avenue Foch along with four other women whose names were Yolande Beekman, Madeleine Damerment, Eliane Plewman and Odette Sansom, all of whom were F Section agents. Later that day they were taken to the railway station, and each handcuffed to a guard upon boarding the train. Sansom, in an interview after the war, said:

We were starting on this journey together in fear, but all of us hoping for something above all that we would remain together. We had all had a taste already of what things could be like, none of us did expect for anything very much, we all knew that they could put us to death. I was the only one officially condemned to death. The others were not. But there is always a fugitive ray of hope that some miracle will take place.

When the women arrived in Germany they were put into separate cells in the prison in Karlsruhe (Justizvollzugsanstalt Karlsruhe) – Sansom with a woman who had been in prison for three years because her own daughter (a member of the Hitlerjugend) had denounced her for listening to the BBC, and Jehovah's Witnesses.

=== Execution at Natzweiler-Struthof ===
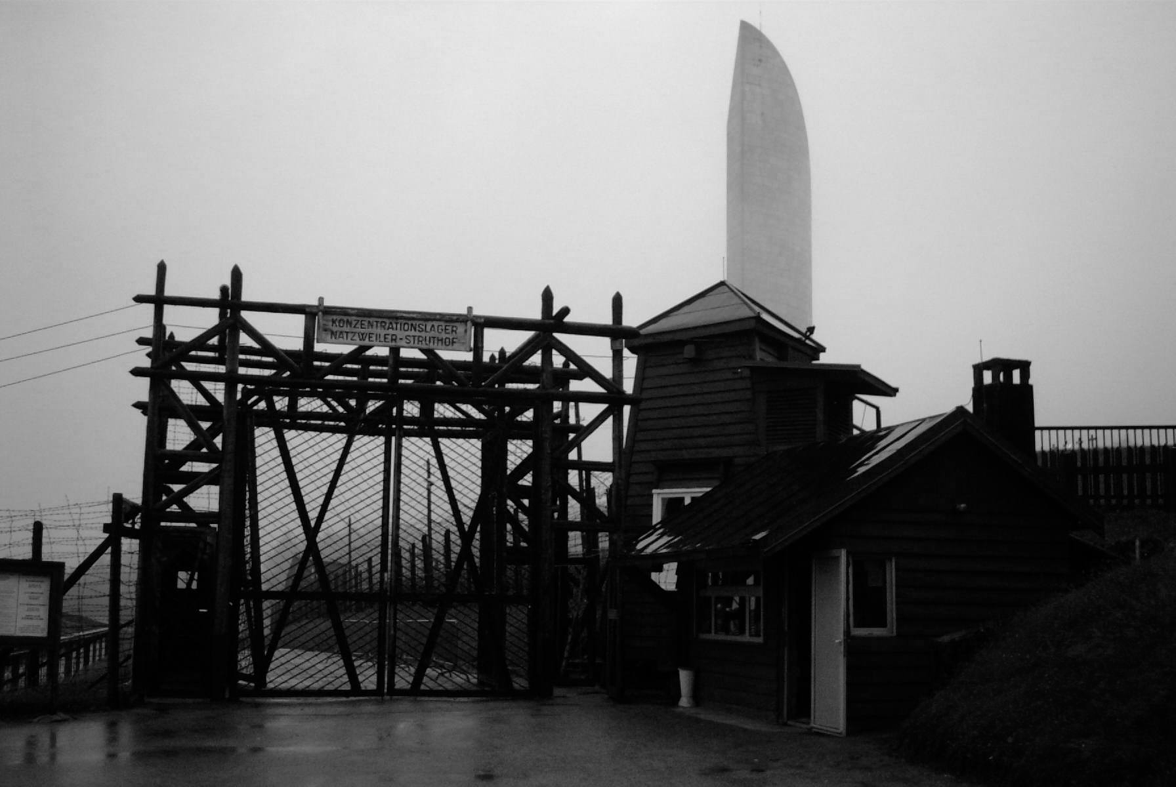
Natzweiler-Struthof camp entrance. Monument to the Departed in background.

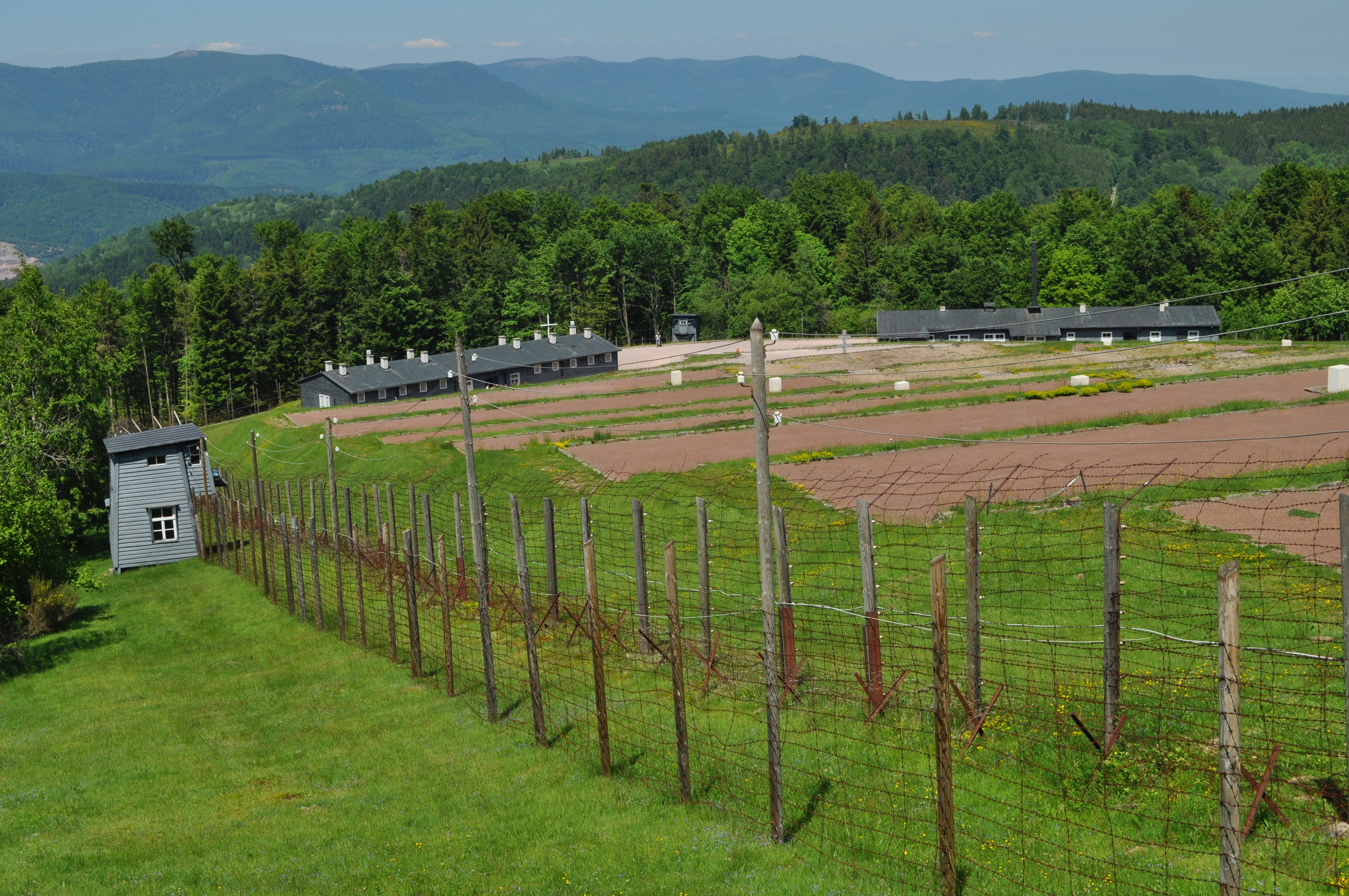
View of former Natzweiler-Struthof Concentration Camp in 2010. The cellblock is the building on the left and the crematorium is the building on the right.

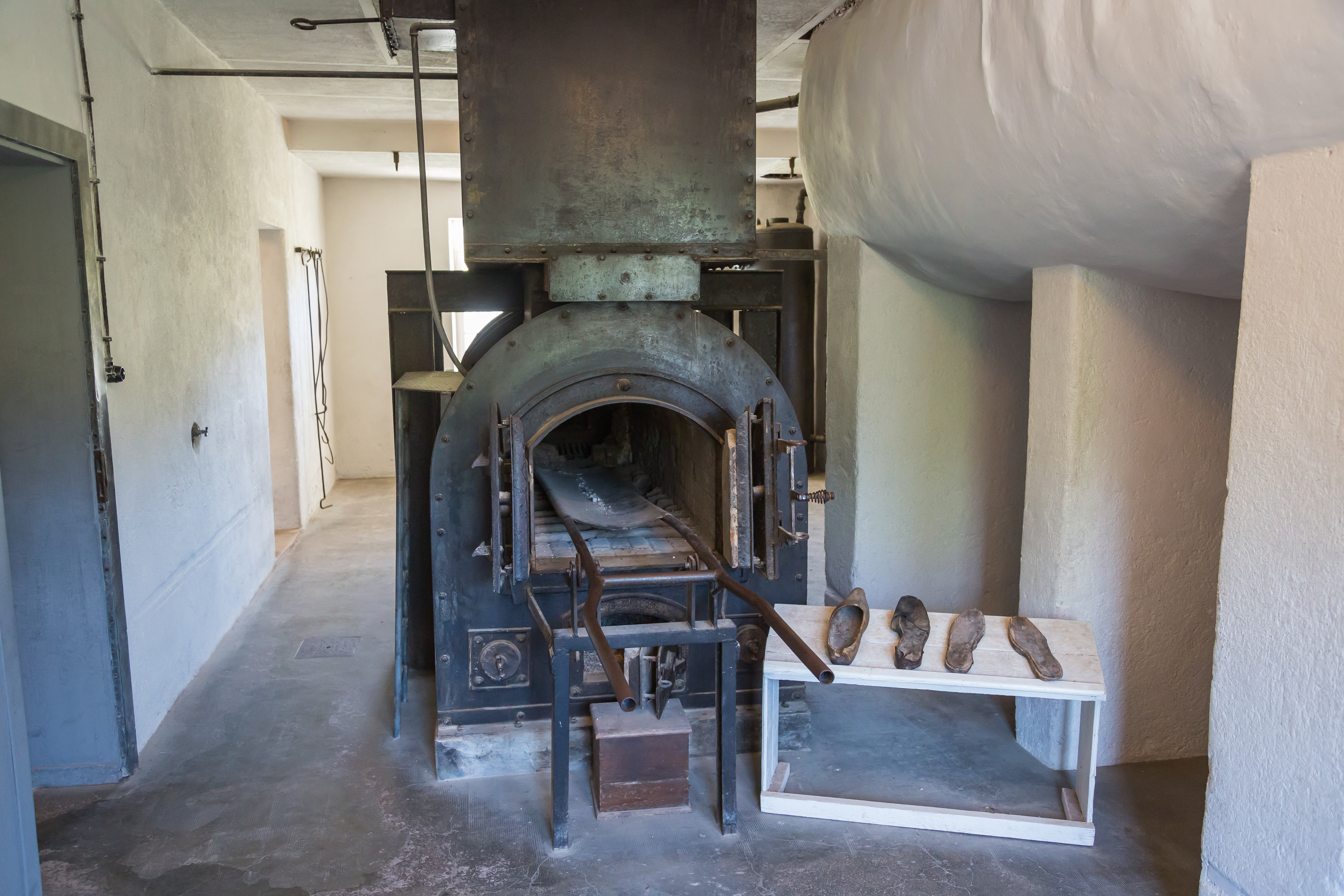
The crematorium at Natzweiler-Struthof

Between five and six in the morning on 6 July 1944, not quite two months after their arrival in Karlsruhe prison, Borrel, Leigh, Olschanezky and Rowden were taken to the reception room, given their personal possessions, and escorted by two Gestapo men 100 kilometres south-west by closed truck to the Natzweiler-Struthof concentration camp in France, where they arrived around three-thirty in the afternoon. The women's arrival was apparently unexpected as was the order by one of the women's escorts that the four women were to be executed immediately.

As women were a rarity in the camp their presence immediately attracted attention from both German guards and prisoners. SS men led the four women through the center of the camp down to the cellblock at the bottom of the camp. They were held there until later that night. "One could see from their appearance that they hadn't come from a camp," said a French prisoner. "They seemed young, they were fairly well groomed, their clothes were not rubbish, their hair was brushed, and each had a case in their (sic) hand."

The four women were initially together but later put into individual cells. Through the windows, which faced those of the infirmary, they managed to communicate with several prisoners, including a Belgian prisoner, Dr Georges Boogaerts, who passed one of the women (whom he later identified as Borrel from a photograph) cigarettes through the window. Borrel threw him a little tobacco pouch containing some money.

Albert Guérisse, a Belgian army physician who had headed the Pat O'Leary escape line in Marseille, recognized Borrel as one of his former helpers. He exchanged a few words with another one of the women, who said she was English (Leigh or Rowden) before she disappeared into the cellblock building. At the post-war trial of the men charged with the execution of the four women, Guérisse stated that he was in the infirmary and had seen the women, one by one, being escorted by SS guards from the cellblock (Zellenbau) to the crematorium a few yards away. He told the court: "I saw the four women going to the crematorium, one after the other. One went, and two or three minutes later another went."

Inside the building housing the crematorium, each woman in turn was told to undress for a medical check and a doctor gave her an injection for what he told one of them was a vaccination against typhus, but was in fact a 10 cc dose of phenol, which the doctor believed was lethal. When the woman became unconscious after the injection, she was inserted into the crematorium oven. Guérrise said, "The next morning the German prisoner in charge of the crematorium explained to me that each time the door of the oven was opened, the flames came out of the chimney and that meant a body had been put in the oven. I saw the flames four times."

The prisoner Guérisse referred to was Franz Berg, who assisted in the crematorium and had stoked the fire that night before being sent back to the room he shared with two other prisoners before the executions. The door was locked from the outside during the executions, but it was possible to see the corridor from a small window above the door, so the prisoner in the highest bunk was able to keep up a running commentary on what he saw. Berg said:

We heard low voices in the next room and then the noise of a body being dragged along the floor, and he whispered to me that he could see people dragging something along the floor which was below his angle of vision through the fanlight.

At the same time that this body was being brought past we heard the noise of heavy breathing and low groaning combined.

…and again we heard the same noises and regular groans as the [next two] insensible women were dragged away.

The fourth, however, resisted in the corridor. I heard her say "Pourquoi?" and I heard a voice […] I recognized as the doctor who was in civilian clothes say "Pour typhus". We then heard the noise of a struggle and the muffled cries of the woman. I assumed that someone held a hand over her mouth. I heard the woman being dragged away too. She was groaning louder than the others.

From the noise of the crematorium oven doors which I heard, I can state definitely that in each case the groaning women were placed immediately in the crematorium oven.

When [the officials] had gone, we went to the crematorium oven, opened the door and saw that there were four blackened bodies within. Next morning in the course of my duties I had to clear the ashes out of the crematorium oven. I found a pink woman's stocking garter on the floor near the oven.

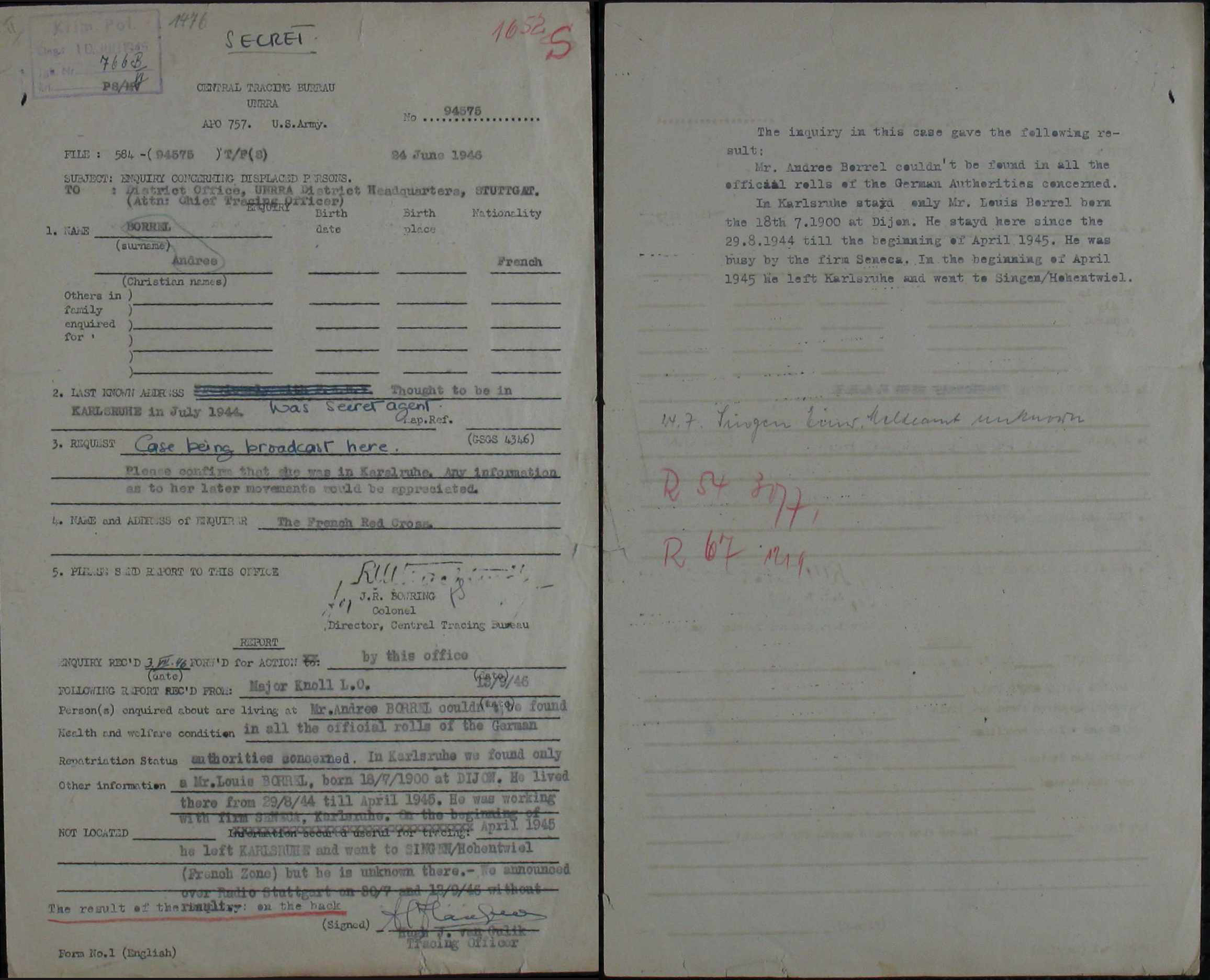
Post-war report on the efforts to locate Andrée Borrel. She was identified as an S.O.E. secret agent, so the report was labelled "SECRET" (top of page).

More than one witness talked of a struggle when the fourth woman was shoved into the furnace. According to a Polish prisoner named Walter Schultz, the SS medical orderly Emil Brüttel told him the following: "When the last woman was halfway in the oven (she had been put in feet first), she had come to her senses and struggled. As there were sufficient men there, they were able to push her into the oven, but not before she had resisted and scratched [Peter] Straub's face." The next day Schultz noticed that the face of the camp executioner (Straub) had been severely scratched.

The camp doctor, Werner Rohde, was executed after the war. Franz Berg was sentenced to five years in prison but received the death penalty in another trial for a different crime and was hanged on the same day as Rohde. The camp commandant, Fritz Hartjenstein, received a life sentence, while Straub was sentenced to 13 years in prison.

== Awards and honours ==
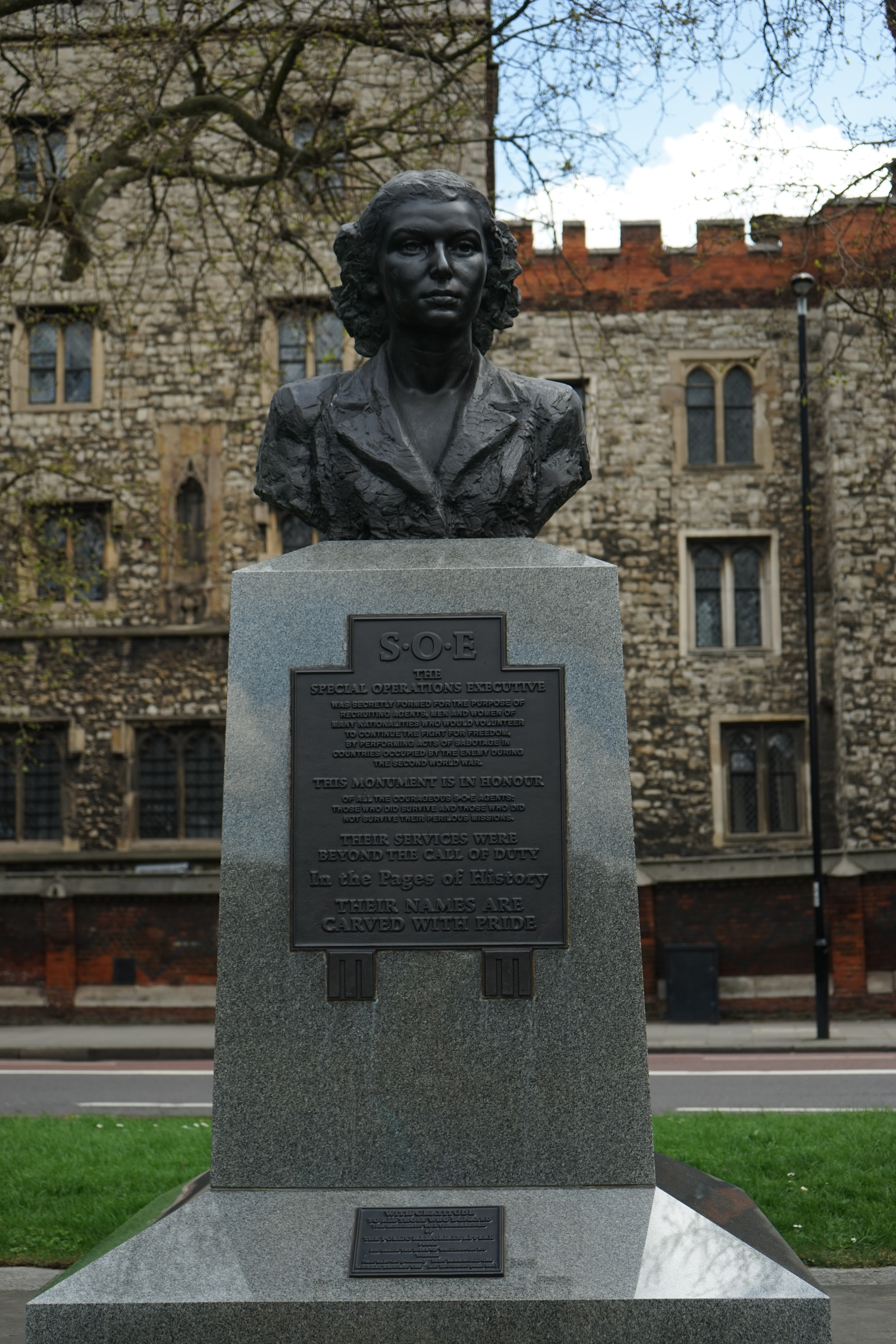
SOE Agents Memorial

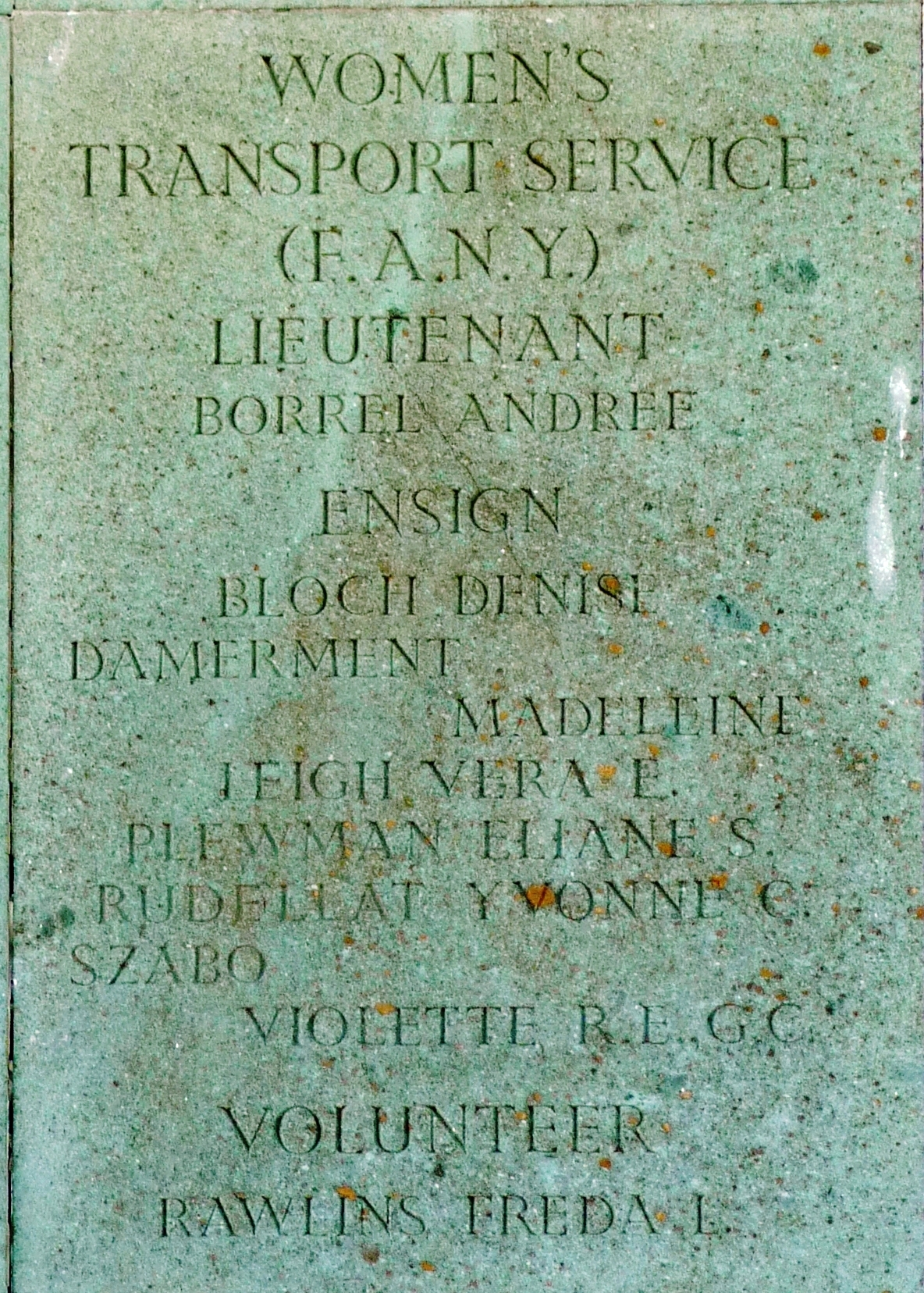
FANY (SOE) memorial, Brookwood Military Cemetery, 5 July 2017

Following Borrel's arrest by the Gestapo, the SOE produced a citation for an award that stated the following:

This officer was parachuted into France in November 1942 as an assistant to an organiser in the Paris area. She proved herself an able and devoted lieutenant, and was appointed second in command of the organisation. Owing to her cool judgment she was always chosen for the most delicate and dangerous work such as recruiting and arranging rendezvous, and she acted as "cut-out" for her commanding officer.

Lt. Borrel was also given the task of organising parachute dropping operations, and took part in several coups de mains, notably an operation against the Chevilly power station in March 1943. She distinguished herself by her coolness and efficiency and always volunteered for the most dangerous tasks. Her commanding officer paid tribute to her great qualities, describing her as "a perfect lieutenant, an excellent organiser who shares all the dangers".

Lt Borrel was arrested by the Gestapo in July 1943. For her great bravery and devotion to duty during nine months of active underground work in France, it is recommended that she be appointed a Member of the Order of the British Empire (civil division).

Posthumously, France awarded Borrel the Croix de Guerre and the Médaille de la Résistance in recognition of her defence of France, while Britain awarded her the King's Commendation for Brave Conduct (KCBC). The concentration camp where she died is a now a French government historical site, where a plaque to Borrel and the three women who died with her is part of the Deportation Memorial on the site. As one of the SOE agents who died for the liberation of her country, Lieutenant Borrel is listed on the "Roll of Honor" on the Valençay SOE Memorial in the town of Valençay, in the Indre department of France. She is also commemorated on the Tempsford Memorial in the village of Tempsford in the county of Bedfordshire in the East of England. A later memorial, the SOE Agents Memorial in Lambeth Palace Road (Westminster, London), is dedicated to all SOE agents. Borrel is also commemorated in column 3 of panel 26 of the Brookwood Memorial as one of 3,500 "to whom war denied a known and honoured grave".

In 1985, SOE agent and painter Brian Stonehouse, who saw Borrel and the three other female SOE agents at the Natzweiler-Struthof concentration camp just before their deaths, painted a watercolour of the four women which now hangs in the Special Forces Club in London.

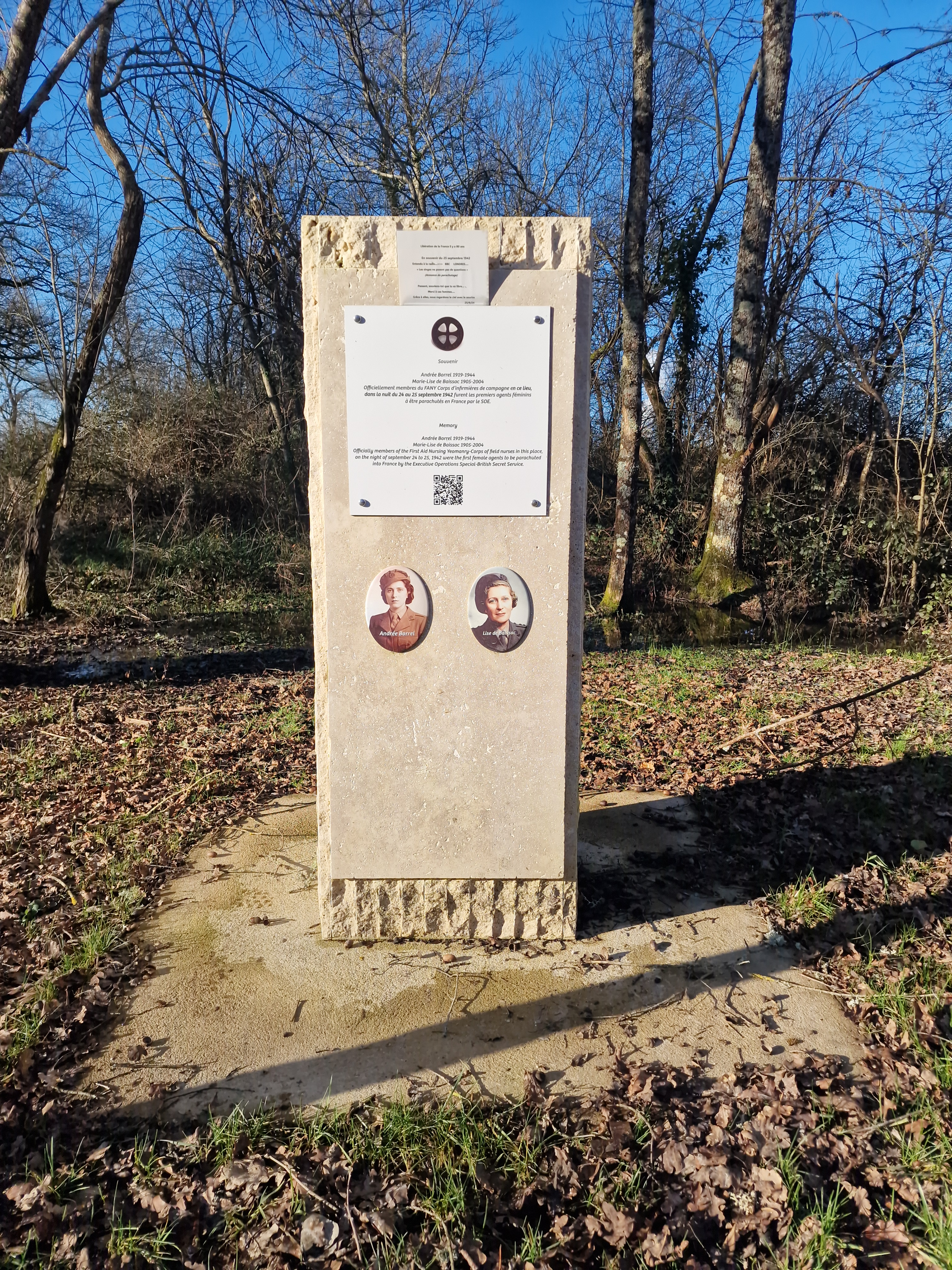
Monument erected in memory of Andrée Borrel and Marie-Lise de Baissac in the town of Saint-Laurent-Nouan (Loir-et-Cher) at a place called Bois-Renard, place of their parachute drop on the night of 24 to 25 September 1942. Inaugurated on September 25, 2022. GPS coordinates: 47.664599,1.600769.

A monument is erected in memory of Andrée Borrel and Marie-Lise de Baissac in the town of Saint-Laurent-Nouan (Loir-et-Cher) at a place called Bois-Renard, the place of their parachuting on the night of 24 to September 25, 1942. It was inaugurated on September 25, 2022. GPS coordinates: 47.664599,1.600769.

== Related cultural works ==
- Carve Her Name with Pride (1958)

Movie based on the book by R.J. Minney about Violette Szabo, starring Paul Scofield and Virginia McKenna.

- Churchill's Spy School (2010)

Documentary about the SOE "finishing school" on the Beaulieu estate in Hampshire.

- Les Femmes de l'Ombre (aka Female Agents) (2008)

French film about five SOE female agents and their contribution towards the D-Day invasions.

- Nancy Wake Codename: The White Mouse (1987)

Docudrama about Nancy Wake's work for SOE, partly narrated by Wake (Wake was disappointed that the film was changed from an 8-hour resistance story to a 4-hour love story).

- Now It Can Be Told (aka School for Danger) (1946)

Filming began in 1944 and starred real-life SOE agents Captain Harry Rée and Jacqueline Nearne codenamed "Felix" and "Cat", respectively. The film tells the story of the training of agents for SOE and their operations in France. The training sequences were filmed using the SOE equipment at the training schools at Traigh and Garramor (South Morar) and at Ringway.

- Odette (1950)

Movie based on the book by Jerrard Tickell about Odette Sansom, starring Anna Neagle and Trevor Howard. The film includes an interview with Maurice Buckmaster, head of SOE's F-Section.

- Robert and the Shadows (2004)

French documentary on France Télévisions. Did General De Gaulle tell the whole truth about the French resistance? This is the purpose of this documentary. Jean Marie Barrere, the French director, uses the story of his own grandfather (Robert) to tell the French what SOE did at that time. Robert was a French teacher based in the southwest of France, who worked with SOE agent George Reginald Starr (codenamed "Hilaire", in charge of the "Wheelwright" circuit).

- Wish Me Luck (1987)

Television series that was broadcast between 1987 and 1990 featuring the exploits of the women and, less frequently, the men of SOE, which was renamed the 'Outfit'.

== See also ==
- British military history of World War II
- Military history of France during World War II
- Resistance during World War II
