= Trial of Werner Rohde and Eight Others =

Post-World War II trial of Nazi concentration camp staff

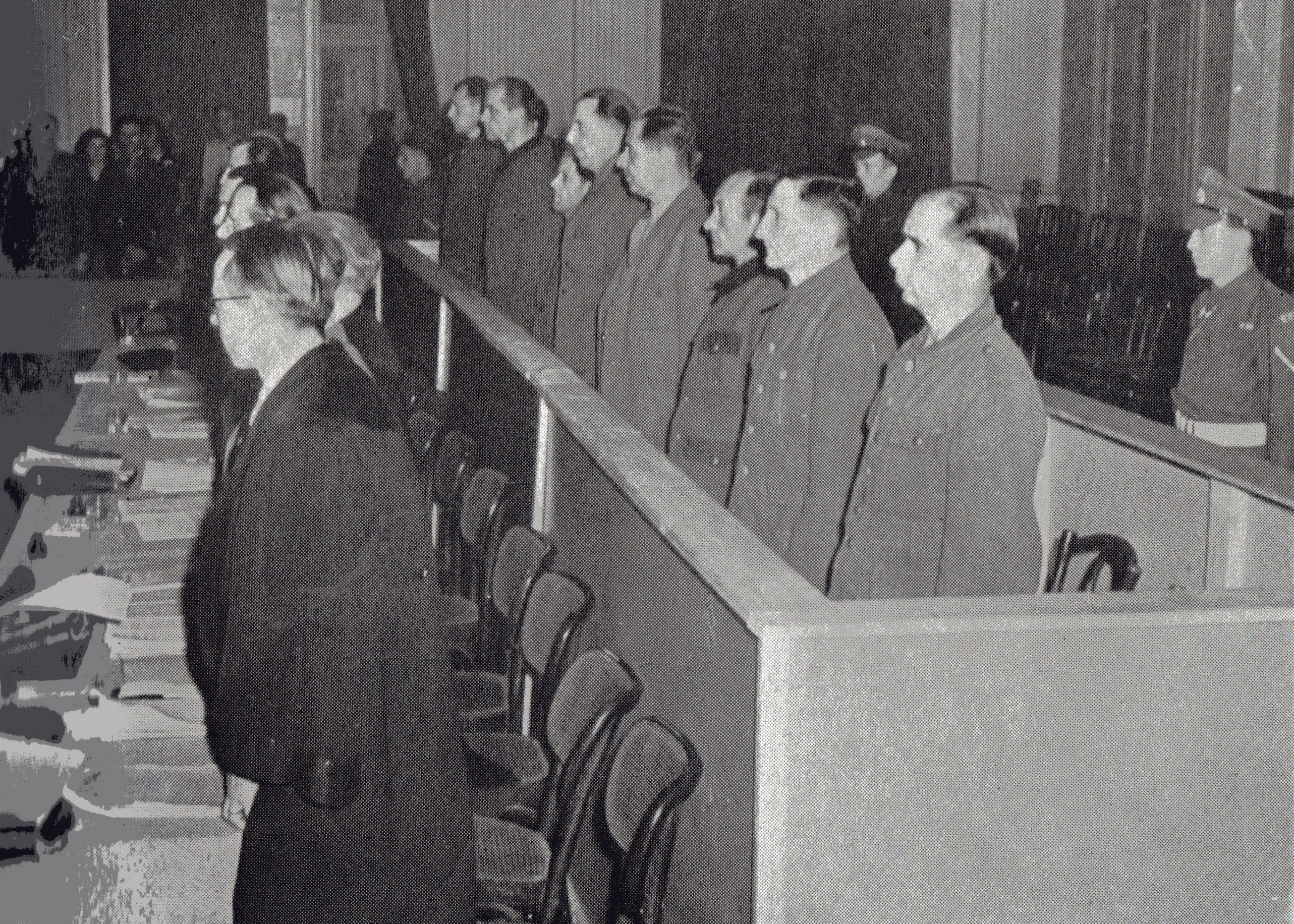
The accused in the dock

The Trial of Werner Rohde and Eight Others was the trial of several members of the Nazi regime in Germany for the execution of British agents without a trial. With the exception of Rohde himself, none were sentenced to death, and a few received relatively short sentences, which, in some cases, were not served as they were released after the trial by the French authorities.

== Background information and proceedings ==
On 28 April 1946, nine members of the concentration camp staff at Natzweiler-Struthof were charged with the murders of four British women before coming to trial on 29 May 1946. Wolfgang Zeuss, Magnus Wochner, Emil Meier, Peter Straub, Fritz Hartjenstein, Franz Berg, Werner Rohde, Emil Bruttel, and Kurt Aus Dem Bruch were all accused of capital murder of British women sent to aid liaison officers in France. These women assisted in establishing communications between the resistance movement in France and London. The names of the victims were Andrée Borrel, Sonia Olschanezky, Vera Leigh and Diana Rowden. Two of these women were a part of the Women's Auxiliary Air Force and the other two were a part of the First Aid Nursing Yeomanry. All four were sent by the SOE for French resistance efforts.

Thought to be spies of the Allied Powers, the Nazi regime detained them and eventually imprisoned them in the Natzweiler Camp. There, these women were allegedly inhumanely killed by lethal injection and then cremated while still living without trial. Major Bill Barkworth of the SAS and Vera Atkins of the SOE were in charge of the prosecution. Though under Articles 29 and 30 of the Hague Convention of 1907 the women were considered spies and therefore legally liable to execution, Article 30 states that no spy can be punished by execution until a trial has found them guilty. The Allied prosecution argued that the secrecy around the executions and the status of the prisoners as 'in protective custody' proved that no such trial had taken place.

== Defendants' arguments and charges ==
All of the accused were officials at the Natzweiler Camp except for Franz Berg who was imprisoned at the camp and worked the oven in the crematory. Horst Kopkow was the head of counterintelligence and was responsible for all SOE agents captured in France at the time. Kopkow was never tried because he had not yet been captured at the time of the investigation. By 1946, he had been captured and was in British custody but was thought to have died of bronchial pneumonia. In 1948, the Allies realised that he had been sent to aid in Counterintelligence efforts against the Soviets for uses in the Cold War.

Fritz Hartjenstein was the Kommandant of the Natzweiler Camp and claimed that he was not present at the camp during the time of the executions and stated he had no idea that they were given the lethal injections. However, evidence was found that he was at a party in the camp during the same day of the killings. He was sentenced to imprisonment for life and then tried again for the hanging of a pilot in Natzweiler. He was sentenced to death and then extradited to France for another trial for the mass murder of prisoners. He was sentenced to death, but died on death row of a heart attack in 1954.

Werner Rohde was a medical officer at the Natzweiler Camp and admitted that he was ordered by Officer Otto to inject one of the women. Officer Otto was found to not be an official at the camp and also evidence came out that Rohde was aware that the four British women never received a trial before the executions. Rohde was sentenced to death and was hanged on 11 October, 1946 at Hameln (Germany).

Officer Otto was never prosecuted because he had committed suicide when the war ended. Along with Rohde, Dr. Heinrich Plaza assisted in the executions using lethal injections. Plaza was never captured. In 1954, he was sentenced to death in absentia in France, but continued to live and practise as a doctor in Altötting (Bavaria). He died in 1968.

Peter Straub was the SS officer in command for the executions. According to testimony Straub was said to be drunk the night of the executions because of a party thrown for the departure of Plaza. Straub was known to have bragged about injections given to other prisoners in the camp. Straub was executed on 11 October, 1946.

Franz Berg was a prisoner in the camp who operated the crematorium oven. Berg was a recognised criminal with a record of up to 22 crimes. He stated that he never knew that anyone unusual was being cremated and that he was locked in his cell when the injections were being administered. He went on to state a fellow prisoner told him what was happening as the murders were taking place. His defence argument was that Straub told him to heat up the furnaces because he was in charge. Berg was sentenced to five years in prison. He was later found guilty at the Natzweiler trial and executed.

Magnus Wochner was the political head of the Natzweiler Camp and was directly under orders of the Berlin Police. He stated that the four British women were sent to his office and was told by the police that they were going to be executed. He sent them away because he did not think it concerned him and denied having any knowledge of the killings until the trial was conducted. However, one witness told the Judge Advocate that Straub, head of the crematorium, could not conduct any execution without Wochner's permission. Wochner was sentenced to ten years in prison. He was later sent to France for prosecution but was released.

Emil Bruttel was a first aid officer at the Natzweiler Camp who was ordered to bring the lethal injections to the site of the killings. He was outside the room at the time of the murders and stated that he wanted to leave but could not because he did not have a lamp. Moreover, he admitted to hearing words such as "four women spies", "we cannot escape the orders", and "execution" but did not admit to have any knowledge of the executions when given the order to obtain the lethal drugs. Bruttel was sentenced to four years in prison. Once turned over to French custody he was released as well.

== Acquittals ==
Doctor Kurt Aus dem Bruch, the camp dentist, and Guard Commander Emil Meier were found not guilty due to insufficient evidence. Wolfgang Zeuss was found not guilty because he was not at the camp during the time of the executions and the other accused witnesses supported his claim.
