= Brian Stonehouse =

British painter (1918–1998)

Brian Stonehouse MBE
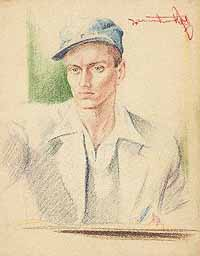
- Concentration Camp Self-portrait drawn with a Mirror - hence the signature
- Born: Brian Julian Warry Stonehouse; 29 August 1918; Torquay, Devon, England
- Died: 2 December 1998 (aged 80); London, England
- Education: Ipswich Art School
- Occupations: Painter; Special Operations Executive agent

Brian Julian Warry Stonehouse MBE (29 August 1918 – 2 December 1998) was an English painter and Special Operations Executive agent during World War II. He was born in Torquay, England and had a brother, Dale. When his family moved to France, he went to school in Wimereux, Pas-de-Calais. Back in Britain in 1932, he studied at the Ipswich School of Art.

== Second World War years ==
Stonehouse worked as an artist but joined the Territorial Army after the outbreak of World War II. He was later conscripted into the Royal Artillery. In 1940, he worked as an interpreter for French troops in Glasgow who had been evacuated from Norway. In the autumn of 1941, he was training for a commission in the 121 Officer Cadet Unit when the Special Operations Executive contacted him. Due to his fluency in French, SOE recruited him as a wireless operator with code name of Celestin.

On 1 July 1942, Stonehouse parachuted into occupied France near the city of Tours in the Loire Valley. His radio got caught in a tree and he spent five nights in the forest before he could get it down. After finally retrieving it, the radio would not work properly and his contact told him to move to Lyon. In September, accompanied by another agent, Blanche Charlet, he went to a safe house and made contact with the other SOE agents, including Henri Sevenet. By August he was in regular contact with the SOE station in London. However he became careless and transmitted too much and too long. As a result, German direction-finders triangulated his position and the Milice arrested him on 24 October 1942 in Chateau Hurlevent near Lyon. Charlet was also captured but later managed to escape to London. After the war Stonehouse discovered that Charlet had tried to commit suicide.

In Castres prison, the Gestapo placed Stonehouse in solitary confinement while subjecting him to frequent and brutal interrogations. In December he was transferred to Fresnes prison in Paris and further interrogated. Eventually he was shipped to Germany with other SOE prisoners, including Albert Guerisse, GC, the Pat O'Leary Line organiser, and Guerisse's Australian W/T operator, Tom Groome. In October 1943, they arrived in Saarbrücken and in November was sent to Mauthausen concentration camp. He spent a brief time in a Luftwaffe factory camp in Vienna. In mid-1944, he was transferred to the Natzweiler-Struthof concentration camp in Alsace with Guerisse, a.k.a. Pat O'Leary. Stonehouse saved his own life by drawing sketches for the camp commandant, guards and their families.

Throughout his time in five prisons, Stonehouse kept his personal vow of never painting or drawing an officer in uniform. At the camp he witnessed the arrival of four female SOE agents, Andrée Borrel, Vera Leigh, Diana Rowden and Sonya Olschanezky, who were all executed and disposed of in the crematorium to make them disappear without a trace, under the programme of "Nacht und Nebel" ("Night and Fog"). After the war, Stonehouse and Guerisse were able to testify at the Nazi war crimes trials as to the women's fate. In 1985, Stonehouse painted a poignant watercolour of the four women from memory which now hangs in the Special Forces Club in London.

From Natzweiler-Struthof, Stonehouse was sent to the Dachau concentration camp from where he was liberated by U.S. troops on 29 April 1945. At home, he was awarded a military MBE. After the war, he remained in the military and was promoted to captain while working for the Allied Control Commission in Frankfurt, Germany where he assisted with the interrogation of Gestapo and SS members.

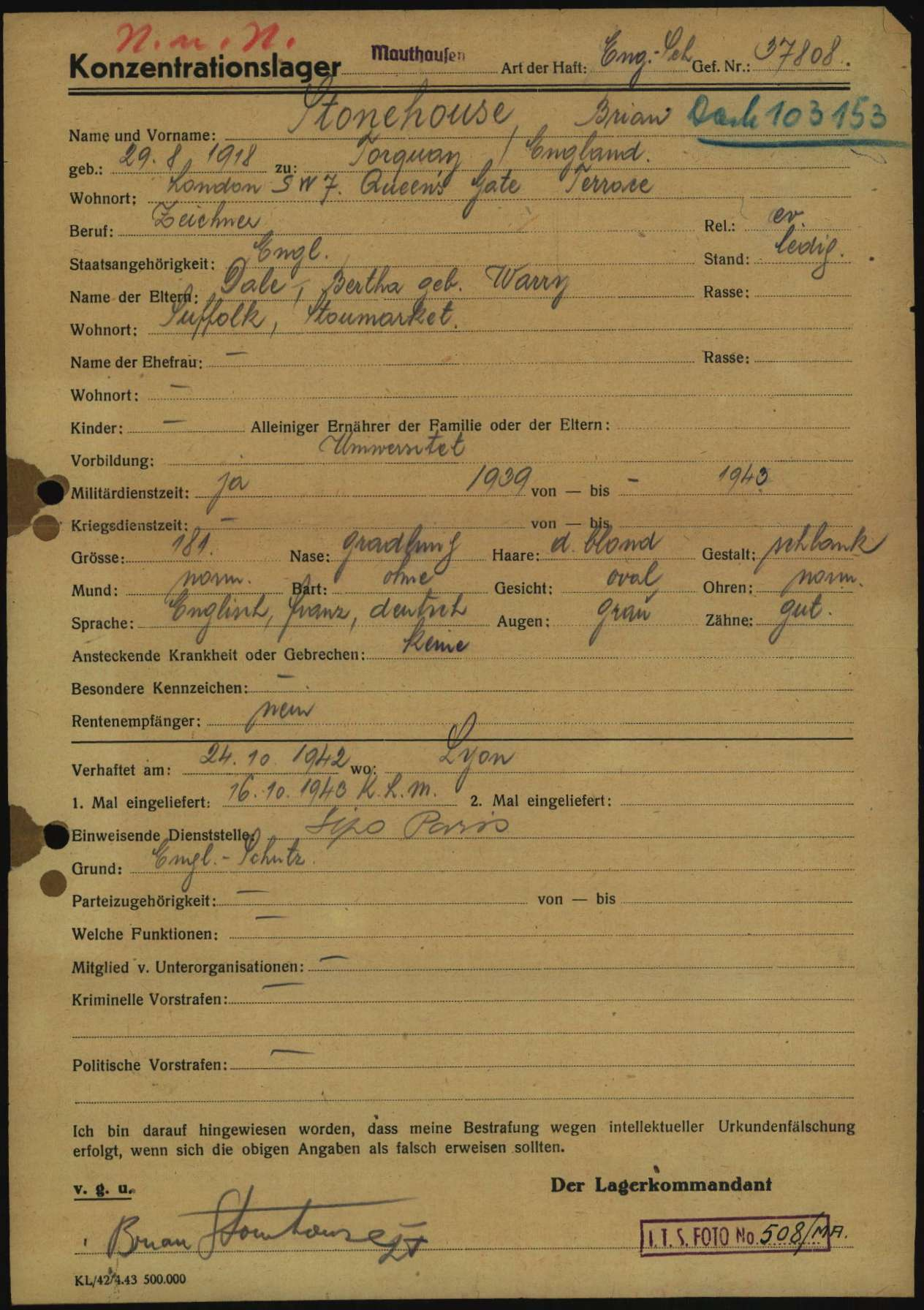
Registration form as a prisoner at Mauthausen

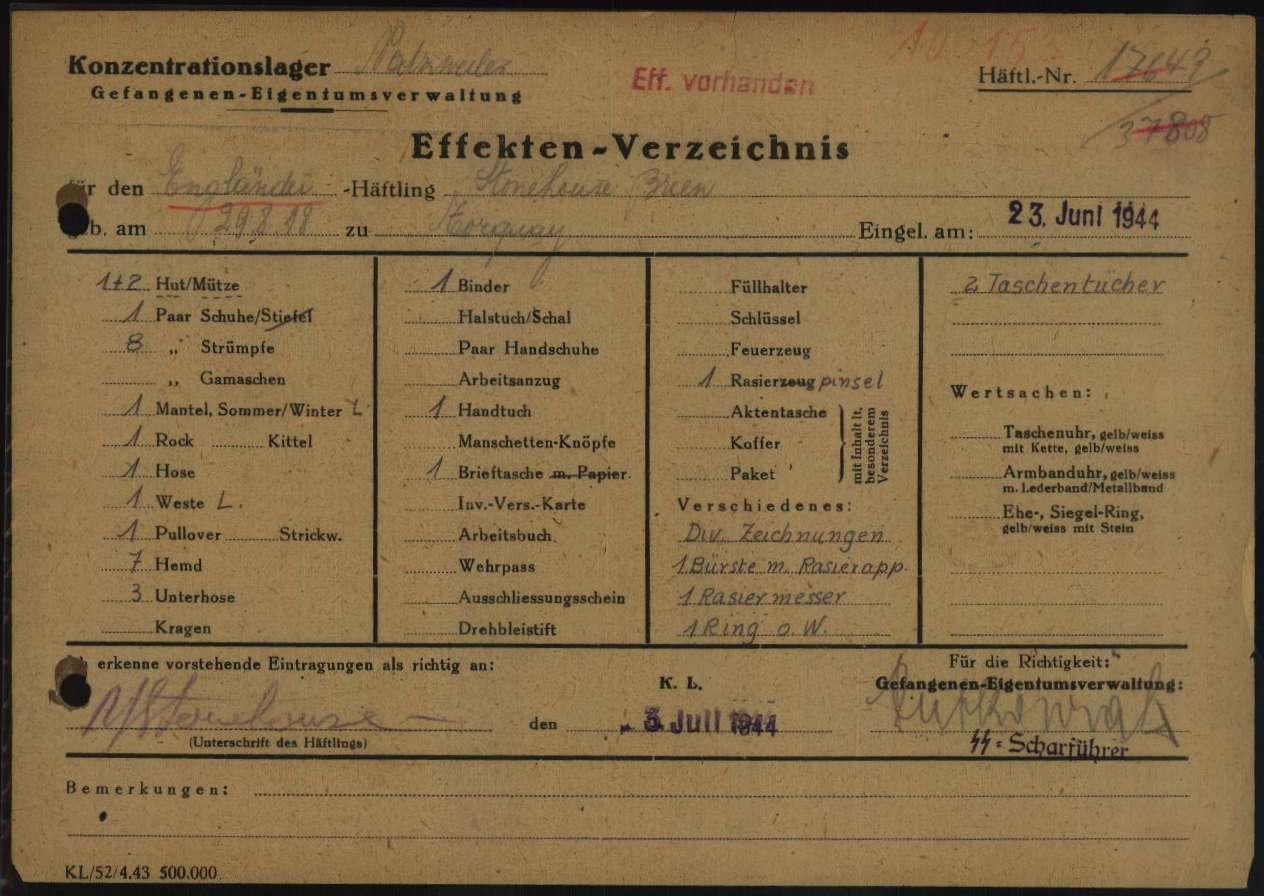
List of personal effects at Natzweiler

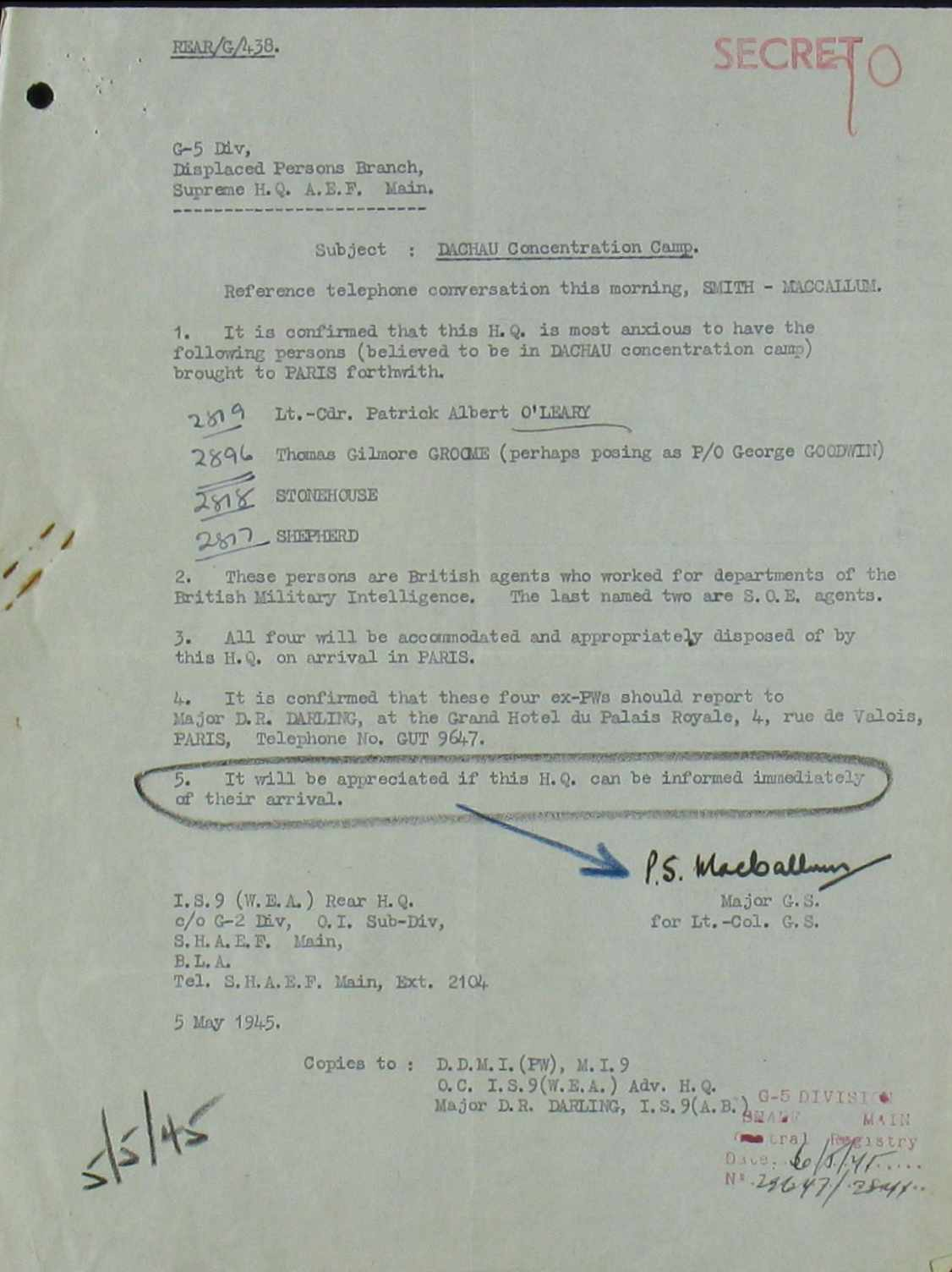
Request (stamped "SECRET") for his repatriation after the liberation of Dachau

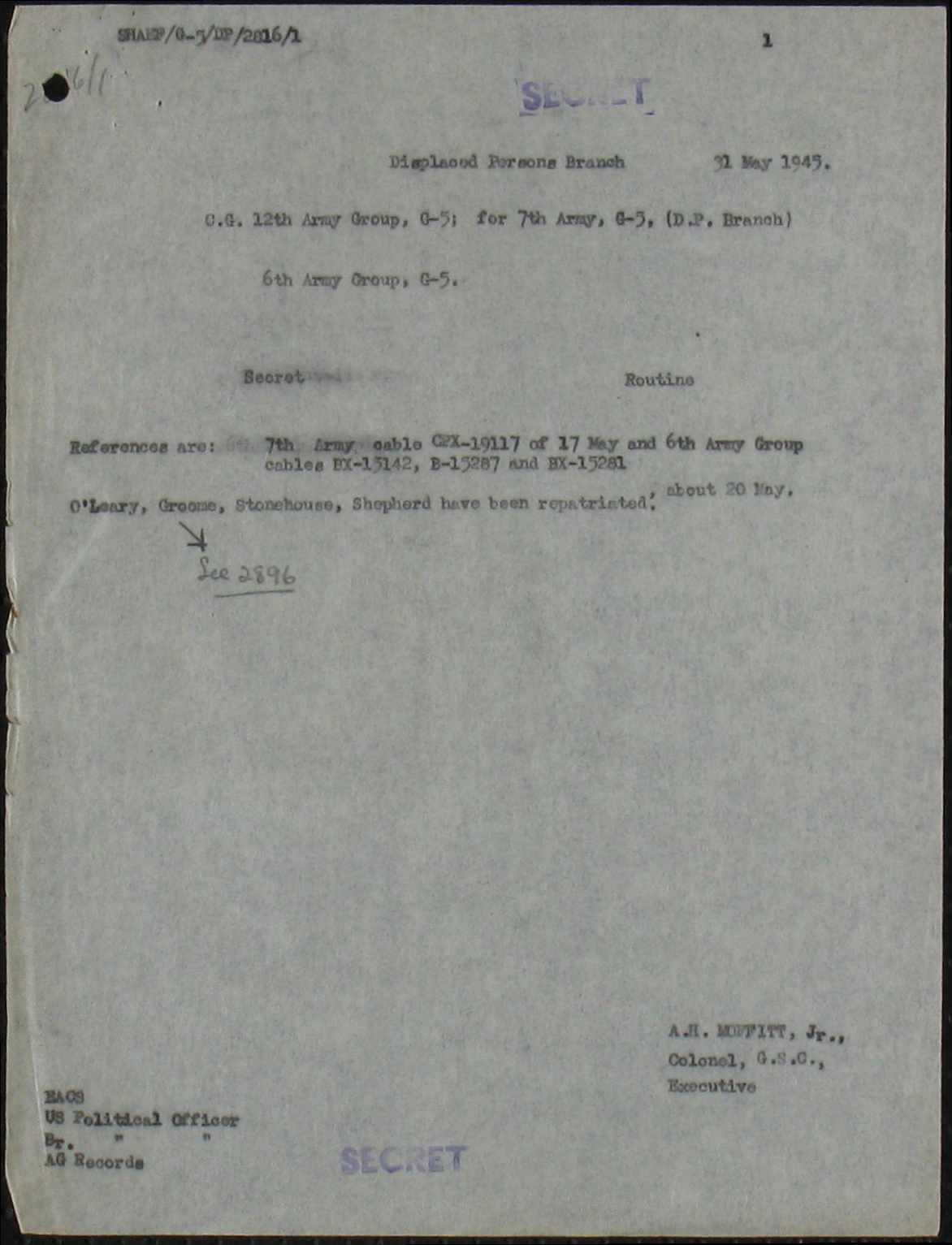
Report (stamped "SECRET") on his repatriation

== Post-war ==
After 1946, Stonehouse continued his career as a fashion artist in the United States, painting for magazines including Vogue, Harper's Bazaar and Elizabeth Arden. In 1979, he returned to Britain and became a portrait painter. His clients included members of the Royal family. One of his last portraits of The Queen Mother, who sat for him many times, still hangs in the Special Forces Club in London. During his final years Stonehouse was an active Theosophist living at the London branch of the United Lodge of Theosophists.

== Brian Stonehouse's art ==
Whilst operating in France Stonehouse continued to sketch and draw people he came across. He was on several occasions told not to carry his sketch books with him whilst 'on duty' (Interview with his surviving brother, May 2007). Throughout his times in various prisons he continued to draw, at first secretly, but after discovery more openly. His collections of drawings of fellow SOE prisoners, life in prison and prison guards along with other personal artefacts was handed over by the Stonehouse Family to the Imperial War Museum London in May 2007. These included, as well as the War Art, for example, postwar letters from surviving SOE operatives and letters and photographs from US President Dwight D. Eisenhower. This last collection included a signed photograph and note from Eisenhower upon meeting Stonehouse again shortly after the war ended. This stated that upon meeting each other again, Stonehouse asked Eisenhower if he knew why he had survived the war. The response from Eisenhower was, "I was going to ask you that". Moyse's Hall Museum Bury St Edmunds discovered and facilitated the handing over of the collections following a VE Day (Victory in Europe Day)/VJ day (Victory over Japan Day) exhibition, to which the family had bought Brian's art and other personal artefacts. A series of exhibitions of Stonehouse's fashion work was held at the Abbott and Holder gallery in London in 2014, 2015, 2016 and 2017.

== Gallery ==
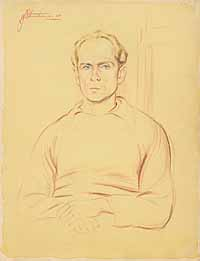
Albert Guérisse ("Pat O'Leary") concentration camp portrait

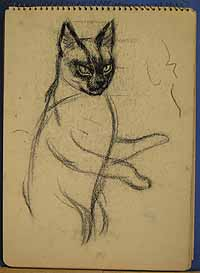
Sleek grey cat

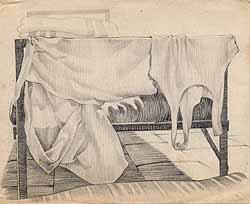
Interior scene concentration camp

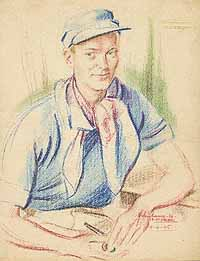
Bob Shepherd concentration camp portrait
