= Fritz Hartjenstein =

SS Officer and Holocaust perpetrator (1905–1954)

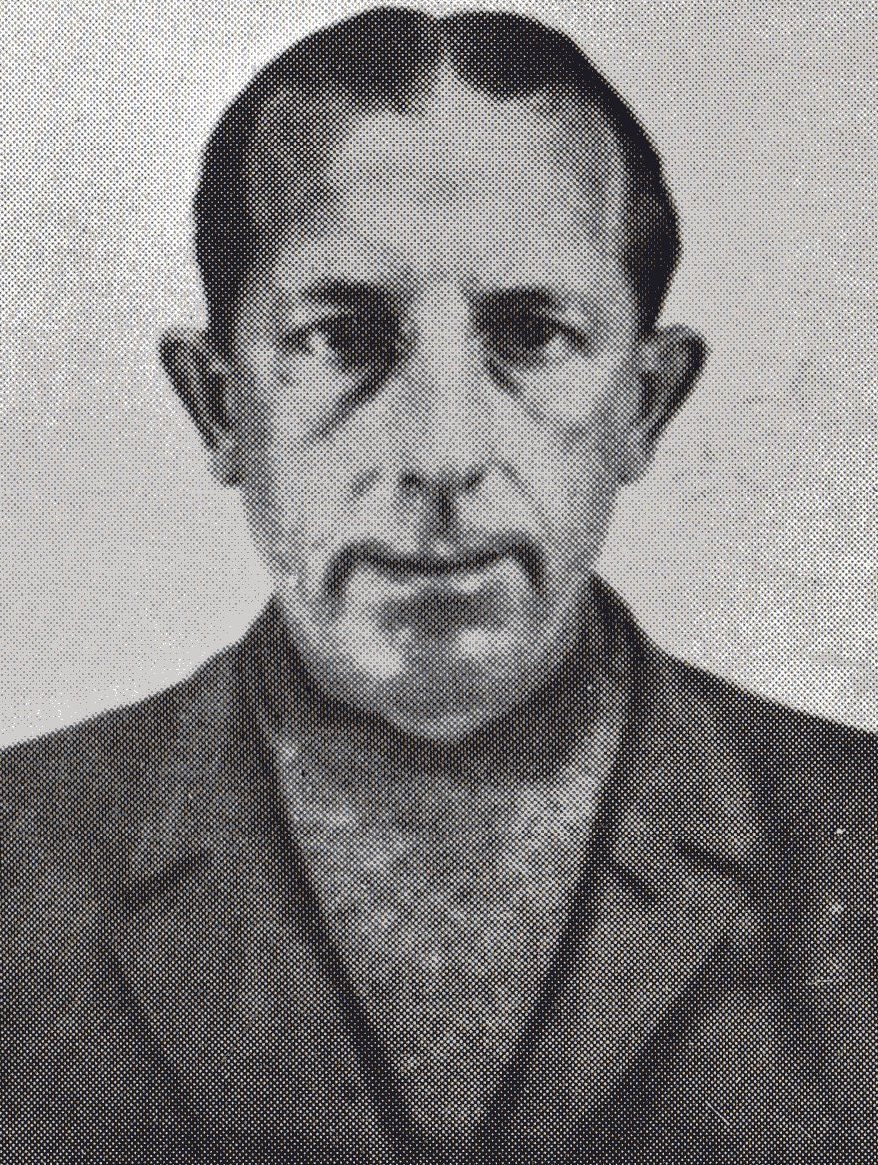
- Hartjenstein in 1946
- Born: 3 July 1905; Peine, German Empire
- Died: 20 October 1954 (aged 49); Paris, French Fourth Republic
- Status: Deceased
- Convictions: British Military; War crimes French Military; Crimes against humanity
- Penalty: British Military; Death; French Military; Death
- SS service
- Allegiance: Nazi Germany
- Branch: Schutzstaffel
- Service years: 1938–1945
- Rank: SS-Hauptsturmführer
- Units: SS-Totenkopfverbände
- Commands: commandant of Birkenau (1942)

Friedrich Hartjenstein (3 July 1905 – 20 October 1954) was a German SS functionary and war criminal. A member of the SS-Totenkopfverbände, he served at various Nazi concentration camps such as Auschwitz and Sachsenhausen. After the Second World War, he was tried and found guilty of murder and crimes against humanity.

== Concentration camp officer ==
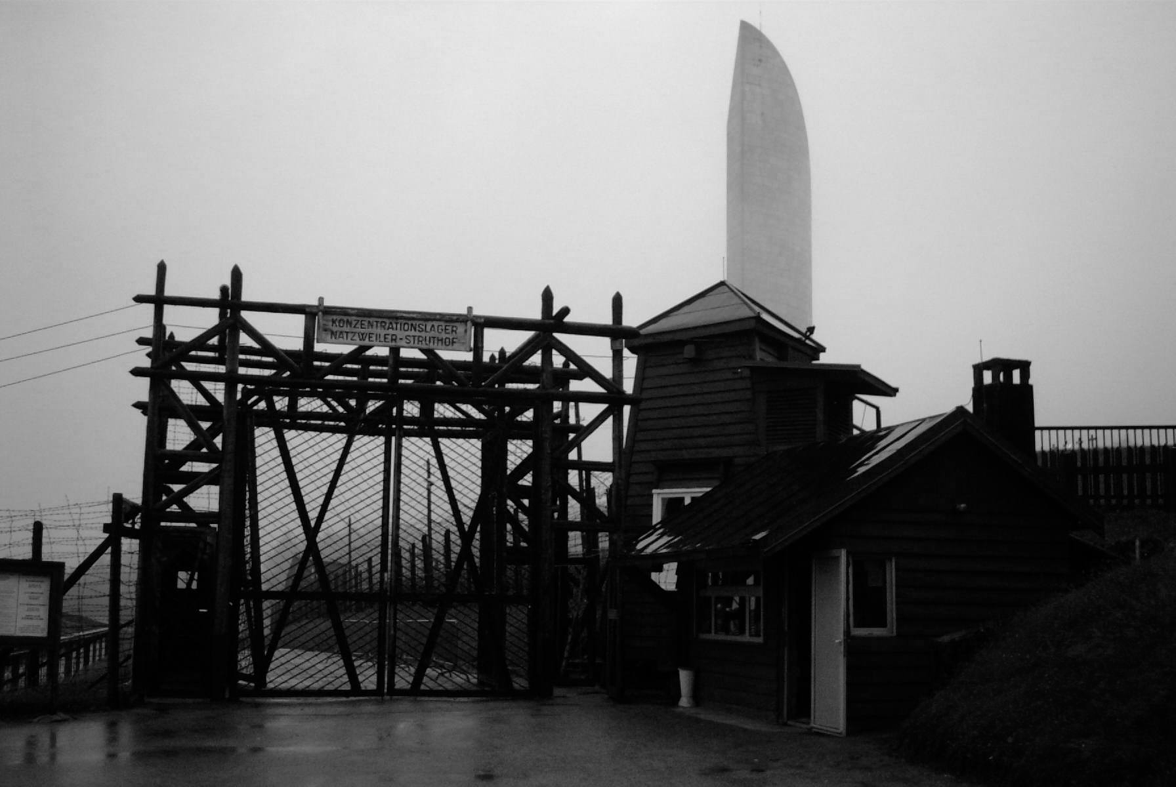
Entrance to Natzweiler-Struthof

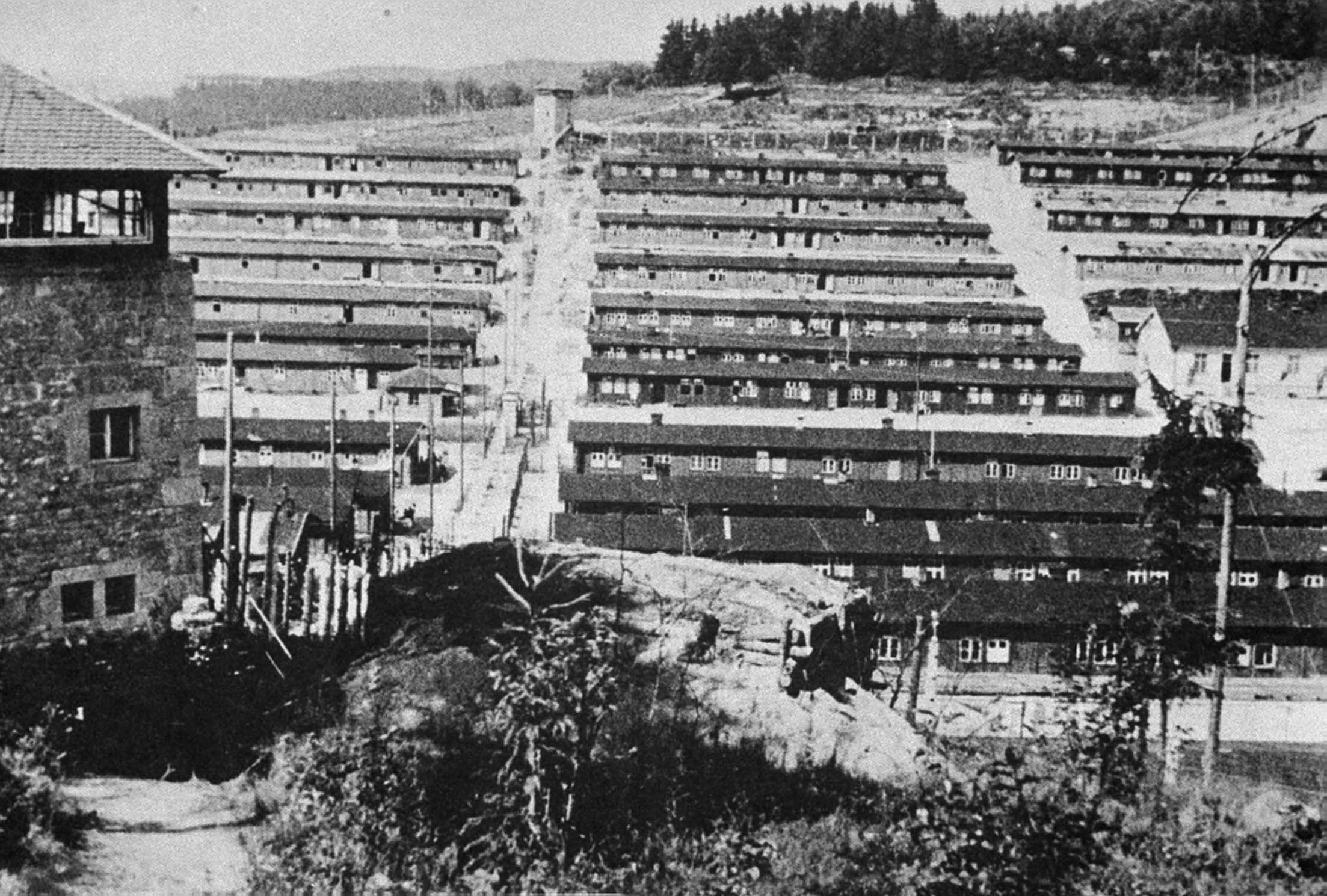
Flossenbürg concentration camp after its liberation by the US Army 90th Infantry Division in April 1945.

Hartjenstein, who was born in Peine, began his SS work at Sachsenhausen in 1938. The following year, he was transferred to Niederhagen. In 1941, Hartjenstein served for a year with the 3rd SS Division Totenkopf, a Waffen-SS combat division.

In 1942, he was appointed the commandant of Birkenau. It was the main camp at Auschwitz, and contained the extermination facilities and crematoria. In 1944, Hartjenstein was appointed commandant of Natzweiler concentration camp in France. In 1945, he worked at Flossenbürg concentration camp.

== Post-war trials ==
Hartjenstein was arrested by the British and, on 6 June 1946, was sentenced to life imprisonment at Wuppertal for executing four female agents of the British clandestine Special Operations Executive organization. He was then tried for hanging a Royal Air Force POW, for which he was sentenced to death.

Hartjenstein was extradited to France, where he was tried for his crimes at Natzweiler, and received another death sentence. He died of a heart attack on 20 October 1954, aged 49, while awaiting execution in Paris.
