= Kotov =

Kotov (Russian: Котов) and Kotova (Russian: Котова; feminine) is a Russian patronymic surname derived from the nickname Kot, i.e., 'cat'. Notable people with the surname include:

- Alexander Kotov (1913–1981), Soviet chess grandmaster and author, after whom Kotov syndrome is named
- Alexander Kotov (handballer) (born 1994), Russian handball player
- Dmitri Kotov (born 2000), Russian footballer
- Elena Kotova (born 1956), Russian writer and interior architect
- Grigory Kotov (1902–1944), Soviet general
- Irina Kotova (born 1976), Belarusian-French painter and graphic artist
- Ivan Kotov (1950-1985), Russian double bassist
- Kirill Kotov (born 1983), Russian football official and former player
- Konstantin Kotov (born 1985), Russian political activist
- Nicholas A. Kotov (born 1965), Russian–American chemist
- Nina Kotova (born 1969), American cellist and composer
- Oksana Kotova (born 1974), Kazakhstani cross-country skier
- Oleg Kotov (b. 1965), Russian cosmonaut
- Pavel Kotov (disambiguation), several people
- Raivo Kotov (born 1976), Estonian architect
- Rein Kotov (born 1965), Estonian film operator and film editor
- Roman Kotov (fl. from 2006), American psychologist
- Sergei Kotov (disambiguation), several people
- Tatiana Kotova (born 1985), the winner of Miss Russia 2006 title
- Tatyana Kotova (born 1976), Russian long jump athlete
- Valerij Aleksandrovich Kotov (born 1943), Crimean solar physicist after whom asteroid 8246 Kotov is named
- Valery Kotov (1939-1993), Soviet speed skater
- Vladimir Kotov (b. 1958), South African long-distance runner
- Yuri Kotov (1929–2022), Russian football coach and player

== See also ==
- Kotoff
