= Hierarchical Taxonomy of Psychopathology =

Classification of mental health problems

The Hierarchical Taxonomy Of Psychopathology (HiTOP) consortium was formed in 2015 as a grassroots effort to articulate a classification of mental health problems based on recent scientific findings on how the components of mental disorders fit together. The consortium is developing the HiTOP model, a classification system, or taxonomy, of mental disorders, or psychopathology, aiming to prioritize scientific results over convention and clinical opinion. The motives for proposing this classification were to aid clinical practice and mental health research. The consortium was organized by Drs. Roman Kotov, Robert Krueger, and David Watson. At inception it included 40 psychologists and psychiatrists, who had a record of scientific contributions to classification of psychopathology The HiTOP model aims to address limitations of traditional classification systems for mental illness, such as the DSM-5 and ICD-10, by organizing psychopathology according to evidence from research on observable patterns of mental health problems.

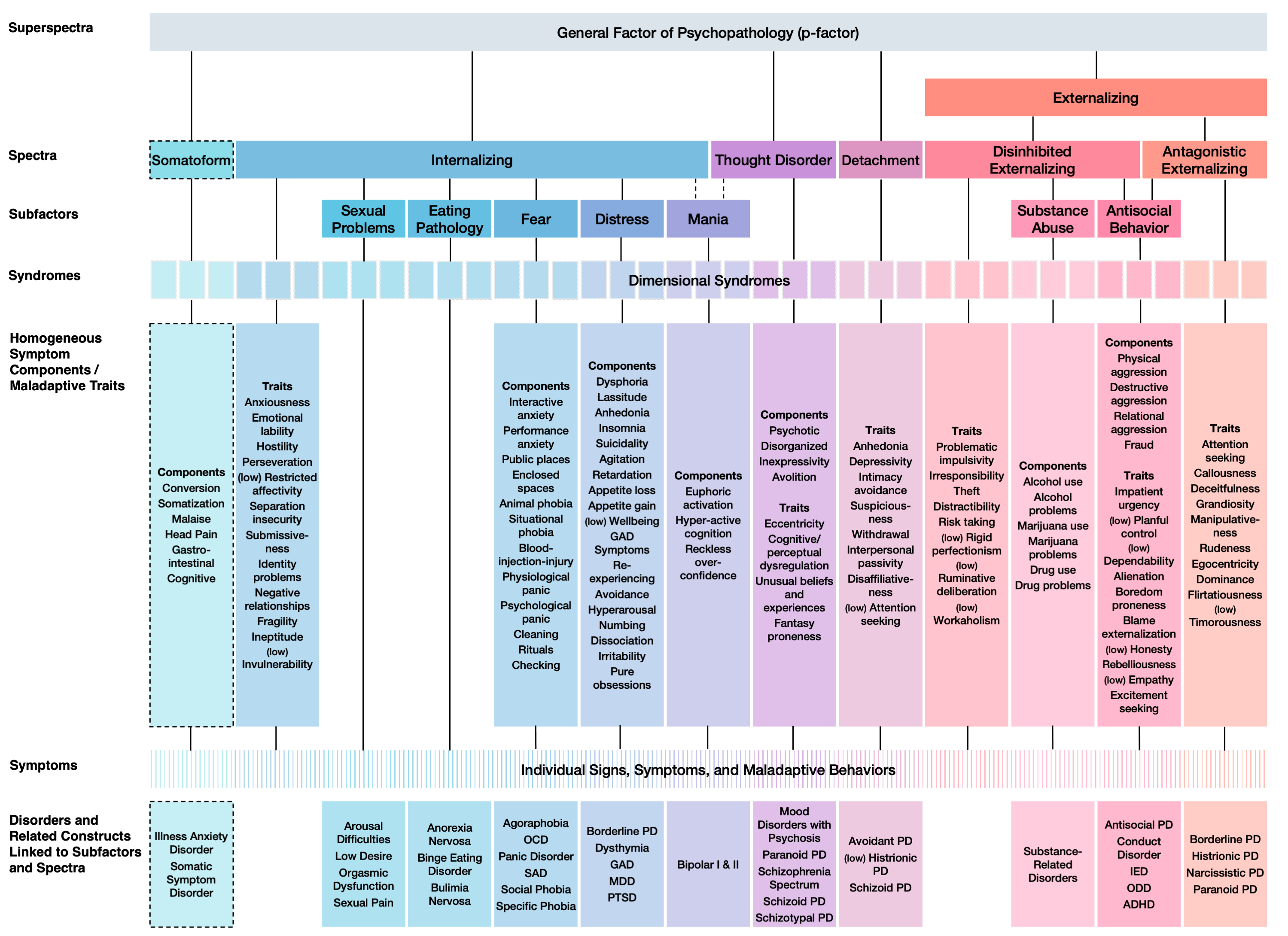
Official Baseline HiTOP Figure. Dashed lines indicate dimensions included as provisional aspects of the model. Notably, the 'disorders and related constructs linked to subfactors and spectra' are not formal parts of the framework, but were listed to identify the constructs that have been used in many studies of the higher-order dimensions. Abbreviations: ADHD, attention-deficit/hyperactivity disorder; GAD, generalized anxiety disorder; IED, intermittent explosive disorder; MDD, major depressive disorder; OCD, obsessive–compulsive disorder; ODD, oppositional defiant disorder; PD, personality disorder; PTSD, posttraumatic stress disorder; SAD, social anxiety disorder

When the HiTOP model is complete, it will form a detailed hierarchical classification system for mental illness starting from the most basic building blocks and proceeding to the highest level of generality: combining individual signs and symptoms into narrow components or traits, and then combining these symptom components and traits into (in order of increasing generality) syndromes, subfactors, spectra, and superspectra. Currently, several aspects of the model are provisional or incomplete.

== History of the quantitative classification movement through HiTOP ==
Throughout the history of psychiatric classification, two approaches have been taken to deciding the content and boundaries of mental disorders that enter official diagnostic rubrics. A first one might be termed authoritative: experts and members of official bodies meet to determine classificatory rubrics through group discussions and associated political processes. This approach characterizes traditional classification systems, such as the DSM and the ICD.

A second approach might be termed empirical. In this approach, data are gathered on psychopathological building blocks. These data are then analyzed to address specific research questions. For example, does a specific list of symptoms delineate a single psychopathological entity or multiple entities? This approach is sometimes characterized as more "bottom up" (i.e., starting with raw observations and inferring the presence of diagnostic concepts), compared with the more "top down" approach (i.e., starting with a general clinical concept and deducing the symptoms that might define it) of official classification systems.

These approaches, although distinguishable, are not entirely separable. Some amount of empiricism and some amount of expert authority is inevitably present in both (i.e., authoritative classification approaches have relied on specific types of empiricism as part of their construction process, and an empirical approach begins with the expertise needed to assemble and assess specific psychopathological building blocks). Nevertheless, authoritative approaches tend to weigh putative expertise, disciplinary background, and tradition heavily. The consortium aims for an empirical rather than authoritative approach, but it has been argued that the HiTOP model is partly authoritative as it is grounded on a traditional but arbitrary statistical approach.

The empirical movement has a long history, beginning with the work of Thomas Moore, Hans Eysenck, Richard Wittenborn, Maurice Lorr, and John Overall, who developed measures to assess signs and symptoms of psychiatric inpatients, and identified empirical dimensions of symptomatology through factor analysis of these instruments. Others have searched for natural categories using such techniques as cluster analysis.

Similarly, research on patterns of emotional (also called affective) experience helped to identify dimensions of depression and anxiety symptoms. Factor analytic studies of child symptomatology found clusters of emotional and behavioral problems that remain in use in research and clinical assessment today. Finally, factor analyses of comorbidity among common adult disorders revealed higher-order dimensions of psychopathology that inspired a growing and diverse literature.

The most recent large-scale effort in this movement toward empirically based classification emerged in the spring of 2015. Forty scholars working in the classification of psychopathology started a consortium (now over 160 members with 10 workgroups) devoted to articulating an empirically based classification system of mental illness. Their initial proposed model – the Hierarchical Taxonomy of Psychopathology – has been claimed to provide a marked departure from DSM and ICD. The HiTOP model is based on structural studies that span from age 2 to 90 and include samples from many non-Western societies. However, Western samples are over-represented in this literature and very little research has been done with people over age 60. The HiTOP model does not account for individual level developmental processes that may lead to various disorder outcomes.

To update HiTOP as new structural and validation studies become available, the Consortium formed a Revisions Workgroup. This workgroup has designed a process for continuous evidence-based revision of the model. This process is intended to be nimble enough to keep pace with a rapidly growing literature on the structure of psychopathology, but not so fickle as to result in numerous changes without substantiated support.

== HiTOP structure ==
=== Fundamental findings that shaped HiTOP ===
Three fundamental findings shaped HiTOP. First, psychopathology is best characterized by dimensions rather than in discrete categories. Dimensions are defined as continua that reflect individual differences in a maladaptive characteristic across the entire population (e.g., social anxiety is a dimension that ranges from comfortable social interactions to distress in nearly all social situations). Dimensions reflect differences in degree (i.e., continua), rather than in kind (i.e., people are either in or outside of each category), as the evidence to date suggests that psychopathology exists on a continuum with normal-range functioning. These dimensions can be organized hierarchically from narrowest to broadest (see Figure). Specifically, dimensional description improves reliability and eliminates the need for "Other Specified" or "Unspecified" diagnoses, as every person has a standing on each dimension and thus is described. Nevertheless, some qualitative boundaries may exist in psychopathology. If categorical entities are identified and replicated, they would be added to HiTOP. Indeed, the term dimensional is not used in the name of the model, in recognition of openness to evidence on discrete entities.

Second, HiTOP assumes that the natural organization of psychopathology can be discerned in co-occurrence of its features. Classification that follows co-occurrence ensures coherence of diagnostic entities, so that related signs and symptoms are assigned together to tightly knit dimensions, whereas unrelated features are placed on different dimensions. Moreover, such constructs capture information about common genetics, risk factors, biomarkers, and treatment response shared by co-occurring forms of psychopathology. Third, psychopathology can be organized hierarchically from narrow to broad dimensions. Numerous studies have found that specific psychopathology dimensions aggregate into more general factors. Patterns of comorbidity are represented by higher-order dimensions. Accordingly, comorbidity is measured and expressed in scores that researchers and clinicians can use.

=== Organization of HiTOP model ===
Consistent with these three fundamental findings, the HiTOP model consists of hierarchically organized dimensions identified in covariation of psychopathology features. Signs, symptoms, and maladaptive traits and behaviors are grouped into homogeneous components- constellations of closely related symptom manifestations; for example, fears of working, reading, eating, or drinking in front of others form performance anxiety cluster. Maladaptive traits are specific pathological personality characteristics, such as submissiveness. The leading conceptualization is that symptoms and maladaptive traits differ only in time frame. A symptom component reflects current functioning (e.g., past month), whereas the corresponding trait reflects functioning on the same dimension in general—that is, over many years.

Closely related homogenous components are combined into dimensional syndromes (e.g., social anxiety). Syndromes are composites of related components/traits, such as a social anxiety syndrome that encompasses both performance anxiety and interaction anxiety. Of note, the term syndrome can be used to indicate a category (for instance, some medical diseases such as Lyme disease are probably best thought of as natural discrete problems that someone either wholly has or wholly does not have), but here we use it to indicate a dimension. Importantly, HiTOP syndromes do not necessarily map onto traditional, categorical disorders like those found in DSM and ICD. Studies often have used categorical disorders to define HiTOP dimensions, but these categorical disorders are used as proxies and are not part of HiTOP as such. Rather than re-arranging DSM and ICD disorders, HiTOP aims to create a system based on signs and symptoms described in these manuals (as well as additional symptoms) and reorganize them based on how studies have found them to occur in combination.

Clusters of closely related syndromes form subfactors, such as the fear subfactor formed by strong links between social anxiety, agoraphobia, and specific phobias.

Spectra are larger constellations of syndromes, such as an internalizing spectrum composed of syndromes from fear, distress, eating pathology, and sexual problems subfactors. Six spectra have been included in HiTOP so far:

- The thought disorder spectrum comprises maladaptive traits of peculiarity, unusual beliefs, unusual experiences, and fantasy proneness, as well as symptom dimensions of disorganization and reality distortion; also symptom dimensions of dissociation and mania are linked to this spectrum provisionally. The thought disorder spectrum includes some signs and symptoms of such disorders as schizophrenia and related disorders, mood disorders with psychosis, schizotypal personality disorder, and paranoid personality disorder, and provisionally dissociative disorders and bipolar disorders.
- The detachment spectrum comprises maladaptive traits of emotional detachment, anhedonia, social withdrawal, and romantic disinterest, as well as symptom dimensions of inexpressivity and avolition. The detachment spectrum includes some signs and symptoms of such disorders as schizoid personality disorder, avoidant personality disorder, schizotypal personality disorder, and schizophrenia and related disorders.
- The antagonistic externalizing spectrum comprises maladaptive traits of manipulativeness, deceitfulness, callousness, grandiosity, aggression, rudeness, domineering, and suspiciousness, as well as symptom dimensions characteristic of antisocial behavior, such as theft, fraud, destruction of property, and aggression. The antagonistic externalizing spectrum includes some signs and symptoms of such disorders as conduct disorder, antisocial personality disorder, intermittent explosive disorder, oppositional defiant disorder, histrionic personality disorder, paranoid personality disorder, narcissistic personality disorder, and provisionally borderline personality disorder.
- The disinhibited externalizing spectrum comprises maladaptive traits of impulsivity, irresponsibility, distractibility, disorganization, risk taking, (low) perfectionism, (low) workaholism, as well as symptom dimensions characteristic of antisocial behavior (listed above), substance use and abuse, inattention, and hyperactivity. The disinhibited externalizing spectrum includes some signs and symptoms of such disorders as alcohol use disorder, substance use disorders, ADHD, conduct disorder, antisocial personality disorder, intermittent explosive disorder, oppositional defiant disorder, and provisionally borderline personality disorder.
- The internalizing spectrum comprises maladaptive traits of emotional lability, anxiousness, separation insecurity, submissiveness, perseveration, and anhedonia, as well as symptom dimensions characteristic of distress, fear, eating problems, and sexual problems; also symptom dimensions of mania are linked to this spectrum provisionally. The internalizing spectrum includes some signs and symptoms of such disorders as major depressive disorder, dysthymia, generalized anxiety disorder, posttraumatic stress disorder, borderline personality disorder, agoraphobia, obsessive-compulsive disorder, panic disorder, social anxiety disorder, specific phobias, anorexia nervosa, binge eating disorder, bulimia nervosa, sexual problems such as arousal difficulties, low desire, orgasmic dysfunction, and sexual pain, and provisionally bipolar disorders.
- The somatoform spectrum comprises symptom dimensions of conversion, somatization, malaise, head pain, gastrointestinal symptoms, and cognitive symptoms. The somatoform spectrum includes some signs and symptoms of such disorders as illness anxiety and somatic symptom disorder.

Superspectra are very broad dimensions comprising multiple spectra, such as a general factor of psychopathology (or p-factor) that represents the liability shared by all mental disorders and the externalizing superspectrum that captures the overlap between the disinhibited and antagonistic externalizing spectra. Recently, emotional dysfunction and psychosis superspectra have also been proposed, capturing the overlap between the internalizing and somatoform spectra, and between the thought disorder and detachment spectra, respectively.

== Limitations of traditional classification systems ==
=== Arbitrary boundaries between psychopathology and normality ===
Traditional systems consider all mental disorders to be categories (i.e., people are either in or outside of each category), whereas the evidence to date suggests that psychopathology exists on a continuum with normal-range functioning. In fact, not a single mental disorder has been established in the scientific literature as a discrete categorical entity. Consistent with this evidence, the HiTOP model defines psychopathology along continuous dimensions rather than in discrete categories. Importantly, HiTOP treats the discrete vs. continuous nature of psychopathology as a research question, and the consortium continues to investigate it.

=== Heterogeneity within disorders ===
Many existing diagnoses are quite heterogeneous in terms of observable symptoms. For instance, there are over 600,000 symptom presentations that satisfy diagnostic criteria for DSM-5 posttraumatic stress disorder. The HiTOP model is informed by evidence from research on observable patterns of mental health problems, grouping related symptoms together and assigning unrelated symptoms to different syndromes, thereby identifying unitary constructs and reducing diagnostic heterogeneity. One limitation of a taxonomy based on symptom correlations such as HiTOP is their inability to handle the multifinality and equifinality of developmental processes.

=== Frequent disorder co-occurrence ===
Co-occurrence among mental disorders, often referred to as comorbidity, is very common in the clinic and general population alike. Comorbidity complicates research design and clinical decision-making, as additional conditions can distort study results and affect treatment (i.e. researching the specific causes of a condition like major depressive disorder is complicated when many study participants will meet criteria for additional syndromes). In terms of classification, high comorbidity suggests that some conditions have been split unnecessarily into multiple diagnoses, indicating the need to redraw boundaries between disorders. Comorbidity also conveys important information about shared risk factors, pathological processes, and illness course. A hierarchical and dimensional classification system such as HiTOP aims to explain these patterns and make it explicitly available to researchers and clinicians.

=== Unclear boundaries between disorders and diagnostic instability ===
Traditional diagnoses generally show limited reliability, as can be expected when arbitrary groups are created out of naturally dimensional phenomena. For example, the DSM-5 Field Trials found that 40% of diagnoses did not meet even a relaxed cutoff for acceptable interrater reliability, indicating boundaries between disorders are unclear. Further, DSM diagnoses have shown low stability over time (i.e., people can fluctuate in diagnostic status even over short intervals with trivial changes in symptom severity). A quantitative classification such as HiTOP also helps to address the issue of instability, as indicated by the high test–retest reliability of dimensional psychopathology constructs.

== Validity evidence ==
Validation of an empirical classification system like HiTOP is an ongoing process, but it already has produced a substantial body of evidence that can be summarized in the following five areas:

- Substantial twin and molecular evidence indicates that genetic associations among forms of psychopathology largely parallel HiTOP organization.
- Biobehavioral constructs of Research Domain Criteria link to HiTOP dimensions with appreciable specificity.
- Accumulating evidence suggests that environmental exposures, such as childhood maltreatment and discrimination, are better construed as risk factors for HiTOP dimensions rather than DSM disorders.
- Many treatments such as antipsychotics, serotonin reuptake inhibitors, and various psychotherapies are thought to act on HiTOP dimensions ranging from symptom components to superspectra.
- Emerging evidence suggests that HiTOP constructs show stronger associations with genetic and neurobiologic markers than DSM diagnoses.

== Research utility ==
Theoretical models of the causes and consequences of psychiatric problems have traditionally been framed around diagnoses. New research highlights the importance of extending this focus to encompass dimensions that span many diagnoses, including both narrowly defined symptoms and traits (e.g., obsessions) and broader clusters of psychological conditions (e.g., internalizing spectrum). The hierarchical structure of HiTOP implies that any cause or outcome of mental illness could emerge because of its effects on broad higher order dimensions, the syndromes, or specific lower order dimensions. An association between a DSM diagnosis and some outcome could reflect one (or more) qualitatively distinct pathways. As an example, individual differences in HiTOP spectra and superspectra are more strongly linked than traditional syndromes to potent stressors that occur early in development like childhood maltreatment, peer victimization, racial discrimination.

Although this approach of comparing pathways to and from dimensions at different levels of HiTOP has been the most common application, it is not the only one. HiTOP constructs are useful predictors of clinical outcomes, such as chronicity, impairment, and suicidality. Ample evidence indicates that dimensional phenotypes tend to be more informative than traditional diagnoses in prognostication. They also account for psychosocial impairment both concurrently and prospectively, explaining differences in impairment several times better than categorical diagnoses. Other outcomes, such as suicidality and future treatment-seeking, appear to follow the same pattern.

Other researchers have evaluated the joint predictive power of sets of HiTOP dimensions above and beyond the corresponding DSM–5 diagnosis. This approach explicitly compares the explanatory potential of dimensional versus categorical approaches to psychopathology.

Additional ways HiTOP can be useful in empirical research include its dimensions serving as outcomes of experimental manipulations both in the lab and in a randomized clinical trial, although such applications are understudied. HiTOP can be assessed directly with validated measures, avoiding the complications of extracting dimensions from DSM-based data using tools like factor analysis that require larger samples. Finally, modeling of symptom-level data enables investigators to simultaneously examine psychopathology at multiple levels of breadth in relation to the same criterion. The Measure Development Workgroup is currently constructing both questionnaire and interview tools to measure all HiTOP dimensions and provide crucial comprehensive data for testing and revising HiTOP.

== Clinical utility ==
In the HiTOP framework, psychopathology of given patient is no longer described with a list of categorical diagnoses, but as a profile on dimensions with varying degrees of severity and including all levels from components and traits through spectra and superspectra. HiTOP explicitly acknowledges the clinical reality that no clear divisions are empirically supported between most mental disorders and normality or, oftentimes, even between neighboring disorders. In practice, clinical decisions are not simply whether to treat the patient or not (reflecting whether the disorder is present or not). Rather, a graded set of interventions varying in intensity is typically deployed in response to a corresponding level of clinical need. HiTOP profile is compatible with this approach, and multiple ranges can be specified on a given dimension to guide the choice of intervention. Currently there is no evidence that compares treatment outcomes using HiTOP model results to conventional approaches including the DSM.

HiTOP's adoption of a dimensional perspective does not necessarily preclude the use of categories in clinical practice. For example, it is common in medicine to superimpose data-driven categories (e.g., normal, mild, moderate, or severe) on dimensional measures, such as blood pressure, cholesterol, or weight. A similar approach can be used with HiTOP. Ranges of cut points can be based on a pragmatic assessment of relative costs and benefits. For instance, in primary care settings, a more liberal (i.e., inclusive or sensitive) threshold can be used for identifying patients requiring more detailed follow-up. Conversely, decisions about more intensive or risky treatments can use a more conservative (i.e., exclusive or specific) threshold. Research has begun to delineate such ranges for some measures, but much more is needed to cover the full spectrum.

Most importantly, HiTOP explicitly acknowledges that ranges are pragmatic and not absolute, recognizing the need for flexibility in clinical decision-making. Categorical and dimensional systems can relay equivalent information as long as cut points are not reified, an approach that is explicit in the HiTOP model.

Clinicians tend to use DSM diagnoses for billing much more than for case conceptualization or treatment decisions. Many clinicians report that formal diagnosis does not provide helpful guidance beyond cardinal symptoms (e.g. after recording the primary features of the disorder, clinicians may not refer back to the formal diagnosis for purposes of treatment planning or selection). A chief objective of HiTOP is to make diagnosis more useful for clinicians.

Three types of evidence support this aspiration. First, HiTOP dimensions show substantially higher reliability than DSM diagnoses, meaning the dimensional profile is likely to be more consistent over time and more likely to be agreed upon across multiple clinicians. Second, growing evidence indicates that these dimensions are about twice as informative as diagnoses in answering such clinical questions as who is impaired by symptoms, who will need services, who will recover, and who will attempt suicide. Third, though it is debated, initial survey data from clinicians indicated that they see more utility in HiTOP dimensions than DSM diagnoses. Nevertheless, much is currently unknown about the clinical utility of HiTOP. The topic needs both further research and pragmatic guidance such as the development of HiTOP-based practice guidelines.

In the HiTOP consortium, the Measure Development Workgroup is constructing a comprehensive new inventory expected to be ready for clinical use in 2022. Meanwhile, the Clinical Translation Workgroup has assembled a battery of existing normed and validate self-report measures that assesses most of the model and requires 40 minutes to complete. The battery is free, self-administered, and automatically scored. The Workgroup also developed manuals, trainings, and online resources to help clinicians with practical questions such as billing. The battery is used in a dozen psychology and psychiatry clinics that participate in the HiTOP Field Trials to test questions about clinical utility of the system.

== Personality and personality disorders ==
Included within the HiTOP structure are personality disorders, as well as general personality traits. It is worth providing particular attention to the personality disorders and personality because the shift to a dimensional structure has been rather successful for the personality disorders, including even a formal recognition within Section III of DSM-5 (for emerging measures and models) and within the forthcoming ICD-11.

Personality disorders have been included within every edition of the DSM as categorical syndromes, such as the borderline, narcissistic, schizotypal, and antisocial (or psychopathic). However, the validity of these diagnostic categories have long been questioned, including the concerns regarding arbitrary boundary with normal personality functioning, substantial overlap across the different syndromes, and considerable heterogeneity within each diagnostic category. The heterogeneity within each category and the overlap across categories hinder considerably the ability to identity a pathology that is specific to a particular syndrome and a unified, consistent treatment protocol.

The Five Factor Model (FFM) is arguably the predominant dimensional model of general personality structure, consisting of the domains of neuroticism (or emotional instability), extraversion versus introversion, openness (or unconventionality), agreeableness versus antagonism, and conscientiousness (or constraint). The FFM has substantial construct validity, including multivariate behavior genetics with respect to its structure, cognitive neuroscience coordination, childhood antecedents, temporal stability across the life span, and cross-cultural validity, both through emic studies considering the structures indigenous to alternative languages and a large number of etic studies across major regions of the world, including North America, South America, Western Europe, Eastern Europe, Southern Europe, the Middle East, Africa, Oceania, South–Southeast Asia, and East Asia. The FFM has also been shown to be useful in predicting a wide variety of important life outcomes, both positive and negative.

There is also a considerable body of research to demonstrate that the DSM and ICD personality disorders are maladaptive variants of the domains (and facets) of the FFM. This empirical support includes researchers descriptions of each personality disorder in terms of the FFM, clinicians descriptions, and research relating measures of the FFM to alternative measures of the personality disorders. One can in fact use an FFM measure to assess for the presence of many of the personality disorders, such as borderline and antisocial, yielding indices that are equal in validity to the direct, traditional measures of these personality disorders. Finally, there is also a body of research to indicate that clinicians prefer dimensional trait models over the DSM categorical syndromes for patient description and treatment planning.

Section III of DSM-5, for emerging measures and models, now includes a dimensional trait model called the Alternative DSM-5 Model for Personality Disorders (AMPD), consisting of the five dimensional trait domains of negative affectivity, detachment, psychoticism, antagonism, and disinhibition, along with 25 underlying facets, which can be assessed with the Personality Inventory for DSM-5 (PID-5). Research with the PID-5 has indicated excellent coverage of the DSM-5 Section II (or DSM-IV) categorical syndromes. It should be acknowledged though that the AMPD does still retain six of the DSM-IV categorical syndromes. A more extensive shift to a dimensional trait model is provided by the forthcoming ICD-11, which includes the five trait domains of negative affectivity, detachment, dissociality, disinhibition, and anankastia (along with a borderline pattern specifier). The ICD-11 trait model does not include a domain of psychoticism as the ICD has placed schizotypal traits within the spectrum of schizophrenia rather than within the personality disorders. The DSM-5 trait model does not include a domain of anankastia, but in the initial version of the trait model there was a domain of compulsivity that is closely aligned with anankastia.

Both the DSM-5 Section III and ICD-11 dimensional trait models are aligned with the FFM. "These domains [of the DSM-5 dimensional trait model] can be understood as maladaptive variants of the domains of the five-factor model of personality". As stated in DSM-5, "these five broad domains are maladaptive variants of the five domains of the extensively validated and replicated personality model known as the 'Big Five,' or the Five Factor Model of personality". The five domains of ICD-11 are likewise aligned with the FFM: "Negative Affective with neuroticism, Detachment with low extraversion, Dissocial with low agreeableness, Disinhibited with low conscientiousness and Anankastic with high conscientiousness"
