= Disruptive mood dysregulation disorder =

Mental disorder

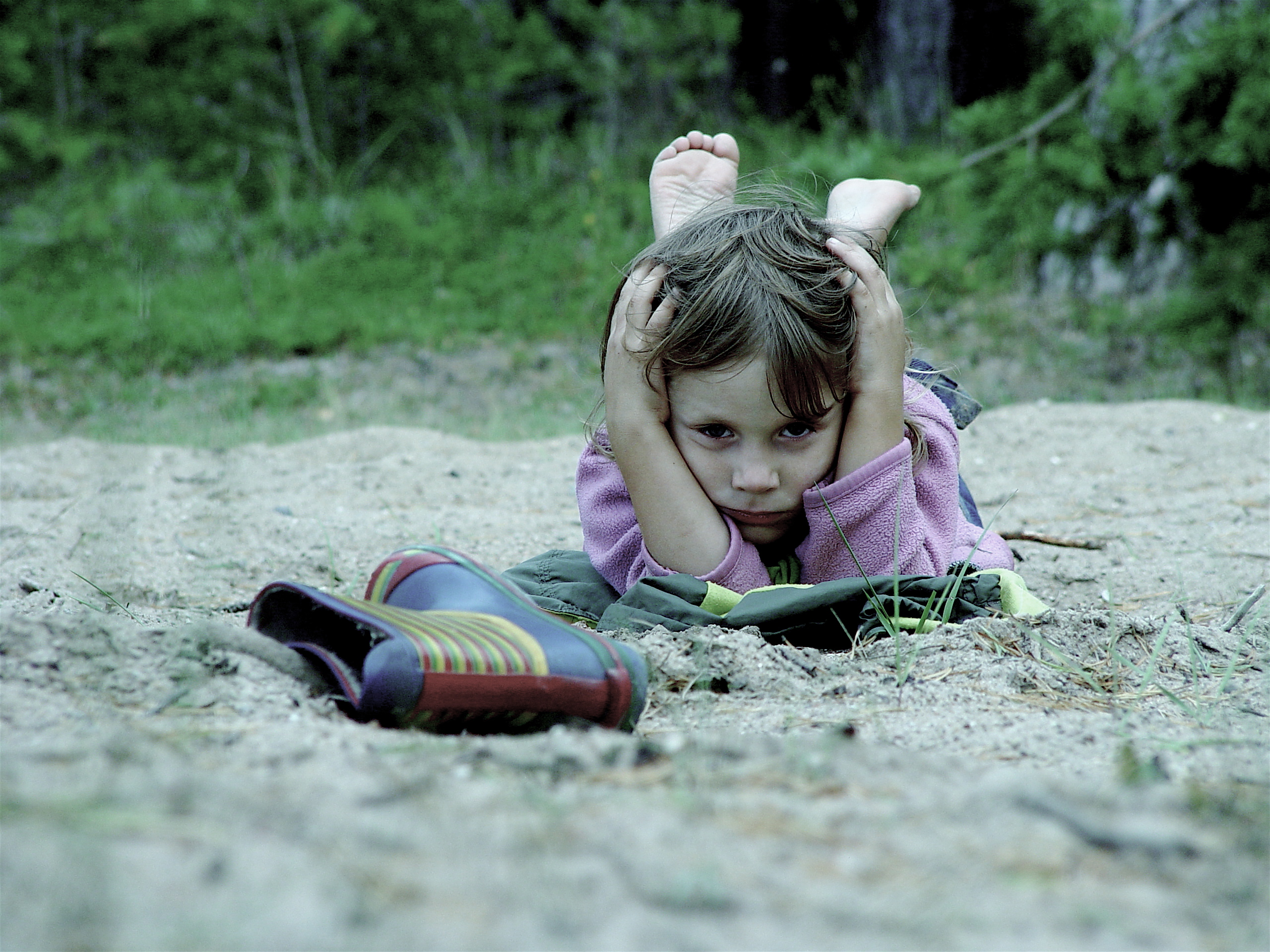
- Children with DMDD show persistent irritability with angry temper outbursts.
- Specialty: Psychiatry, clinical psychology
- Symptoms: Persistent irritability, recurrent outbursts of anger that exceeds the typical reaction of same-aged peers, difficulty regulating emotions
- Usual onset: Ages 6 to 10
- Duration: At least one year, often resolves by adulthood
- Risk factors: Temperament, environment, genetics
- Differential diagnosis: Bipolar disorder, major depressive disorder, anxiety disorder, oppositional defiant disorder, attention deficit hyperactivity disorder, autism spectrum disorder, intermittent explosive disorder, conduct disorder
- Treatment: Medication, therapy
- Medication: Stimulants (associated symptoms), antidepressants, antipsychotics

Disruptive mood dysregulation disorder (DMDD) is a mental disorder in children and adolescents characterized by a persistently irritable or angry mood and frequent temper outbursts that are disproportionate to the situation and significantly more severe than the typical reaction of same-aged peers. DMDD was added to the Diagnostic and Statistical Manual of Mental Disorders, Fifth Edition (DSM-5) as a type of mood disorder diagnosis for youths. The symptoms of DMDD resemble many other disorders, thus a differential includes attention deficit hyperactivity disorder (ADHD), oppositional defiant disorder (ODD), anxiety disorders, childhood bipolar disorder, intermittent explosive disorder (IED), major depressive disorder (MDD), and conduct disorder.

DMDD first appeared as a disorder in the DSM-5 in 2013 and is classified as a mood disorder. Researchers at the National Institute of Mental Health (NIMH) developed the DMDD diagnosis to more accurately diagnose youth who may have been previously diagnosed with pediatric bipolar disorder who had not experienced episodes of mania or hypomania.

Diagnosis requires meeting criteria set by the DSM-5, which includes frequent and severe temper outbursts several times a week for over a year that are observed in multiple settings. Treatments include medication to manage mood symptoms as well as individual and family therapy to address emotional regulation skills. Children with DMDD are at risk for developing depression and anxiety later in life.

== Signs and symptoms ==
Children with DMDD show severe and recurrent temper outbursts three or more times per week. These outbursts can be verbal or behavioral. Verbal outbursts are often described by observers as "rages", "fits", or "tantrums". Temper outbursts will vary between children in type, nature, and setting, so it is important to talk with parents about the nature of the outburst and their triggers. Unlike the irritability that can be a symptom of other childhood disorders such as oppositional defiant disorder (ODD), anxiety disorders, and major depressive disorder (MDD), the irritability displayed by children with DMDD is not episodic or situation-dependent. In DMDD, the irritability or anger is severe and is shown most of the day, nearly every day in multiple settings, lasting for one or more years. In other words, it is important to discern between general irritability and tantrums that can be episodic and common in pediatric patients and the easy provocation and extreme anger expressions of threatening to kill, throwing things, or attacking someone, as seen in DMDD. While all children may experience irritability and frustration, children with DMDD have difficulty controlling the level of anger and have reactions out of proportion to the situation. For instance, a child with DMDD can become extremely upset or emotional to the point of intense temper outbursts with yelling or hitting after being asked by a parent to stop playing and complete their homework. These levels of outbursts occur multiple times per week.

Furthermore, most children with DMDD display symptoms that meet the criteria of attention deficit hyperactivity disorder (ADHD), and a smaller portion of children with ADHD will display symptoms similar to DMDD. Originally, a distinctive disorder from which DMDD was derived, severe mood dysregulation disorder (SMDD), had the requirement for at least three "hyperarousal" symptoms such as pressured speech, racing thoughts, intrusive behavior, distractibility, insomnia, and agitation, but these are not included in the most recent DMDD criteria.

=== Comorbidity ===
The core features of DMDD—temper outbursts and chronic irritability—are sometimes seen in children and adolescents with other psychiatric conditions. However, in children with DMDD, comorbidities with other psychiatric disorders appear to be extremely common as well as the range of disorders that can co-occur. Common comorbidities of DMDD include ADHD, major depressive disorder, anxiety disorders, conduct disorder, and substance use disorders.

==== Attention deficit hyperactivity disorder ====
Attention deficit hyperactive disorder (ADHD) is a neurodevelopmental disorder characterized by problems with inattention, hyperactivity, impulsivity, or a combination of the three. ADHD is also associated with impaired executive functioning, structural and functional abnormalities in brain parts, such as frontal-striatal, with specific gene mutation. Patients with DMDD often exhibit symptoms of ADHD due to their inattention and distractibility.

==== Major depressive disorder ====
Major depressive disorder (MDD) is a mood disorder characterized by daily or nearly daily symptoms of down or depressed mood for all or almost all the day. The DSM-5 requires an individual meets 5 of 9 criteria for at least the past 2 weeks that cause significant impairment in daily life and are not caused by other medical conditions or substance use. MDD often presents differently when comparing children and adults. Young children between 3 and 8 years old presenting with somatic complaints (e.g., stomach aches, dizziness), irritability, anxiety, general behavioral problems, and less of the typical sadness commonly seen in adults. Similar to ADHD, developing MDD in early adulthood was found to be linked with persistent irritability during early adolescence, which can be seen in DMDD.

==== Anxiety disorder ====
Anxiety disorders are a broad category of disorders that are all generally characterized by excessive fear (emotional response to a real or perceived imminent threat) and anxiety (the anticipation of a future threat). The objects or situations that are the sources of the fear and anxiety a person experiences, which can often lead to avoidant behavior, are used to characterize the different anxiety disorders. With DMDD, the severe mood dysregulation is associated with higher rates of anxiety and depressive disorders in the future.

==== Conduct disorder ====
Conduct disorder is a behavior disorder characterized by repeated, persistent patterns of behavior that violate the rights of others and disregard major societal norms and rules. While both DMDD and conduct disorder are associated with argumentative and defiant behavior, DMDD is distinctly differentiated from conduct disorder by the DSM-5. Individuals with DMDD experience severe emotional dysregulation not seen in conduct disorder. Additionally, conduct disorder is described by a distinct lack of remorse and repeated physical harm and threats of harm to people or animals. Evidence of conduct disorder during childhood is one of the criteria for an adult diagnosis of antisocial personality disorder; however, adults with a continued diagnosis of conduct disorder do not necessarily have antisocial personality disorder.

==== Substance use disorder ====
Substance use disorders (SUD) encompass a broad range of specific diagnoses, but they all generally have the characteristics of cognitive, behavioral, and physiological symptoms that cause someone to continue to use a substance despite significant impairment. One salient feature of SUDs is that they change the brain circuitry in such a way that the changes can persist beyond detoxification. In general, though, examining the comorbidity of SUDs in DMDD is important as it may be linked to self-medication for underlying mood disorders or trauma. However, while there are reports in community and clinical samples of comorbidity for SUDs with DMDD, there has been no formal examination of this link.

== Pathophysiology ==
While no specific study has been done on children with DMDD, an NIMH research group led by Ellen Leibenluft has conducted studies on children with episodic and non-episodic irritability with neuroimaging. More specifically, these studies have used behavioral, neurocognitive, and physiologic measures that include functional magnetic resonance imaging (fMRI), event-related potentials (ERPs), and magnetoencephalography. In general, studies have shown that there are four major dysregulated domains that cause dysfunction, primarily in distress levels with frustrating tasks and emotional labeling. The specific domains include impaired emotional and attention regulation, misinterpretation of stimuli, impaired sensitivity to social context, and dysfunction of the reward system. For example, some studies have shown youths with DMDD to have problems interpreting the social cues and emotional expressions of others. These youths may be especially bad at judging others' negative emotional displays, such as feelings of sadness, fearfulness, and anger.

Compared to children with bipolar disorder and ADHD, fMRI studies suggest that under-activity of the amygdala, the brain area that plays a role in the interpretation and expression of emotions and novel stimuli, is associated with the dysregulation seen in DMDD. Other studies using fMRI have also shown that children with DMDD had deficits in bottom-up early attentional processes and deficits in activation of the brain regions associated with spatial attention, reward processing, and emotional regulation. The hypoactivity of the amygdala and the early attention process deficits mirror those found in depression and ADHD, respectively, partially explaining the comorbidity with these disorders. Furthermore, youths with DMDD showed markedly greater activity in the medial frontal gyrus and anterior cingulate cortex compared to other youths. These brain regions are important because they are involved in evaluating and processing negative emotions, monitoring one's own emotional state, and selecting an effective response when upset, angry, or frustrated. Altogether, these neural differences likely contribute to the longer recovery from frustration seen in children with DMDD, causing impairment with emotional regulation, peer relationships, identifying negative emotions, and experiencing greater fear when looking at neutral faces.

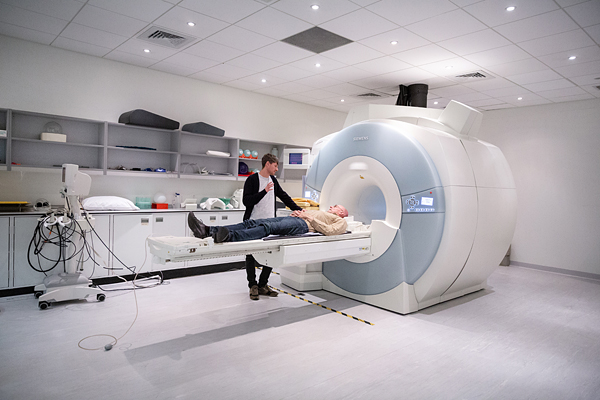
fMRI Machine

== Diagnosis ==
=== DSM-5 diagnostic criteria ===
The DSM-5 includes several additional diagnostic criteria which describe the duration, setting, and onset of the disorder that must be met to make a diagnosis. Of note, the patient's outbursts must be present for at least 12 months and occur in at least two settings (e.g. home and school), and it must be severe in at least one setting. Symptoms appear before the age of 10, and diagnosis must be made between ages 6 and 18. A summary of the criteria is as follows:

Criterion A requires severe and recurrent outbursts that manifest as verbal and/or behavioral rage that are grossly out of proportion (by intensity or duration) to the situation. Criterion B requires that the temper outburst be inconsistent with the child's developmental level while Criterion C requires that the outbursts occur 3 or more times per week, on average. Criterion D states that the mood between the outburst is also persistently irritable or angry most of the day and nearly every day. Criterion E states that Criteria A-D must have been present for 12 or more months without a period of 3 or more consecutive months where they were not all satisfied. Similarly, Criterion F states that Criteria A and D should be present in at least 2 of 3 settings (home, school, peers) and at least 1 setting should have severe symptoms. Criterion G states that DMDD should not be diagnosed before 6 years of age or after 18 years of age for the first time while Criterion H states that Criteria A-E should be seen in the patient's history before 10 years of age. Criterion I states that there should never have been a period of more than 1 day where symptoms for mania or hypomania are met (except duration), but this excludes moments of mood elevation due to a very positive experience or upcoming event. Criterion J similarly states that these behaviors should not exclusively occur during MDD episodes and are not better explained by another mental disorder. Of note, DMDD cannot co-exist with oppositional defiant disorder, intermittent explosive disorder, or bipolar disorder but can co-exist with MDD, ADHD, conduct disorder, and substance use disorders. Lastly, Criterion K states that symptoms cannot be caused by the effects of substance use, another medical condition, or another neurological condition.

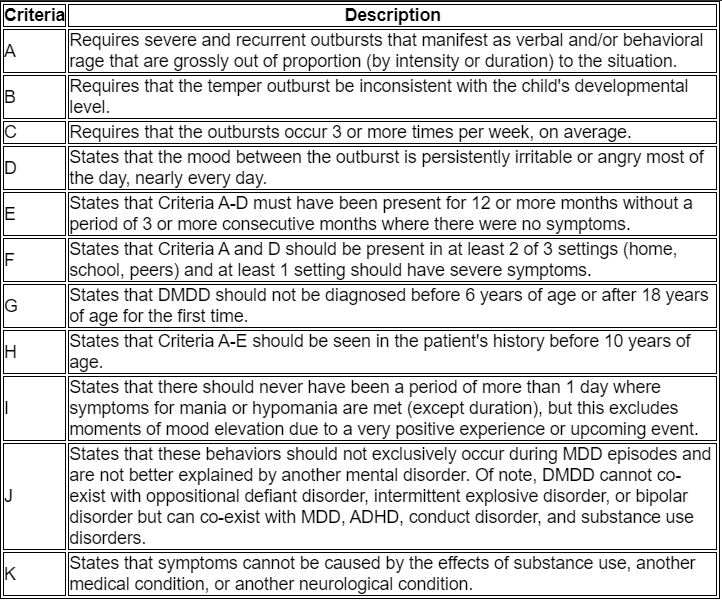
DSM-5 criteria for DMDD organized into a table format

=== Evaluation ===
Evaluation of DMDD requires that professionals, usually a child psychiatrist and/or psychologist conduct comprehensive psychosocial assessments to differentiate a DMDD diagnosis from other depressive and anxiety disorders, with particular focus on the nature of the irritability that is present. Usually, a professional will use a semistructured interviews to elicit the "irritability" as caused by feelings of anger or crankiness or the child being easily annoyed. In any respect, however, there is difficulty in measuring this "irritability" as no consensus or well-validated scales have been established. In fact, more scales for parents and teachers measure the frequency of outbursts rather than the severity. Other scales that capture aggressive behavior rely heavily on forms of physical aggression, which is not required for a DMDD diagnosis. Further, there tends to be a discrepancy in how clinicians interpret the irritability from a diagnostic criterion as well as there being a discrepancy in the reports of "temper outbursts" between parents and professionals. Thus far, National Institute of Mental Health (NIMH) research group has used versions of the Kiddie Schedule for Affective Disorders and Schizophrenia for School-Aged Children to conduct interviews and diagnose DMDD by the DSM-5 criteria.

=== Differential diagnosis ===
Differentiating DMDD from these other conditions can be difficult. A few disorders that closely resemble DMDD, including attention deficit hyperactivity disorder, oppositional defiant disorder, anxiety disorders, childhood bipolar disorder, intermittent explosive disorder, major depressive disorder, and conduct disorder. ADHD, anxiety disorders, MDD, and conduct disorder were discussed above as they can also be comorbidities of DMDD; however, ODD, IED, and bipolar disorder cannot be diagnosed simultaneously in patients with DMDD per Criteria J of the DSM-5.

==== Oppositional defiant disorder ====
Oppositional defiant disorder (ODD) is a disruptive behavior disorder characterized by oppositional, defiant, and sometimes hostile actions directed towards others, especially those with authority. Though both ODD and DMDD have symptoms of outburst and irritability, they differ in terms of severity, duration, and pervasiveness, with DMDD being more severe, longer and more often in duration, and causing impairment across multiple settings. Concurrent diagnoses of both DMDD and ODD are not permitted; individuals who meet the diagnostic criteria for DMDD and ODD should only be diagnosed with DMDD according to the DSM-5-TR (2022).

==== Intermittent explosive disorder ====
Intermittent explosive disorder (IED) is a behavior disorder that is generally characterized by impulsive and aggressive outbursts that are usually rapidly occurring with little to no warning that last for less than 30 minutes due to a minor provocation. People with IED tend to have less severe episodes of verbal and non-destructive physical outbursts between the severe destructive or assaultive outbursts. These outbursts must begin no earlier than the age of 6 years and should occur at least 3 times in a 12-month period. The primary differentiation between IED and DMDD is that, in DMDD, irritability continues persistently between outbursts while in IED, irritability tends to be centered on the outbursts themselves.

==== Bipolar disorder in children ====
Bipolar disorder is a mood disorder characterized by periods of depression or elevated mood that last for weeks. Since both disorders can cause considerable functional impairment, one of the main differences between DMDD and bipolar disorder is the periodicity of the behavioral symptoms. Both conditions can commonly cause dangerous behavior, suicidal ideation or attempts, and severe aggression, possibly requiring psychiatric hospitalization. The irritability and outbursts in DMDD are chronic and displayed constantly on an almost daily basis. On the other hand, bipolar disorder in children is characterized by distinct manic or hypomanic episodes usually lasting a few days, or a few weeks at most, that usually can be differentiated from baseline behavior. The DSM-5 precludes a dual diagnosis of DMDD and bipolar disorder as bipolar disorder in children alone should be used for youths who show classic symptoms of episodic mania or hypomania.

While individuals with bipolar disorder typically display symptoms for the first time as teenagers and young adults, DMDD is usually diagnosed between the ages of 6 and 10. While DMDD is more common than pediatric bipolar disorder prior to adolescents, most children with DMDD see a decrease in symptoms as they enter adulthood. Children with DMDD are more at risk for developing MDD or generalized anxiety disorder (GAD) when they are older rather than bipolar disorder.

=== Controversy ===
The initial creation of the DMDD diagnosis in the DSM-5 was with the intended purpose of addressing the over-diagnosis of bipolar disorder in children. Nevertheless, concerns were raised with the new diagnosis that primarily encompasses the possible negative effects of adding a new childhood diagnosis (such as increased medication use or pathologizing "normal" behavior) and the lack of empirical data for DMDD. For one, the DMDD diagnosis has been criticized for being too broad and including symptoms for other diagnoses, such as ODD, ADHD, anxiety, and depression. Similarly, the diagnostic criteria for DMDD failed the DSM-5 field trials with agreement between clinicians using the DMDD label being poor with questionable agreement. In fact, due to these controversies and overlap of diagnostic criteria with other diagnoses, especially ODD, the WHO recommended to not accept DMDD as its own diagnostic code in the ICD-11 codes and instead place it as a specifier of the ODD diagnosis.

== Treatment ==
The creation of DMDD as a specific diagnosis in the DSM-5 was intended, in large part, to prevent the misdiagnosis of bipolar disorder in children, with hopes of avoiding medication mismanagement in younger mental health patients. Interestingly, recent studies indicate that children diagnosed with DMDD are 12.5% more likely to be prescribed any psychoactive medication, and 7.9% more likely to be prescribed an antipsychotic medication than children diagnosed with bipolar disorder.

At this time, DMDD does not have a standardized treatment course as few treatment studies have been conducted, so, instead, treatment guidelines from other disorders with similar characteristics as DMDD are used. Thus, treatments for DMDD are based on treatments associated with irritability in disorders like SMDD, ODD, bipolar disorder, anxiety, ADHD, MDD, conduct disorder, or general aggressive behavior and include both psychopharmacological and psychotherapy, which appear to work. At this time, the NIMH is funding studies to improve current treatments and find new ones specifically for DMDD.

=== Psychopharmacology ===
Generally, it is recommended that children start with psychotherapy first, though in some instances psychotherapy with psychopharmacology is prescribed as first line treatment. Recent trends have shifted toward prescription of antidepressants, specifically selective serotonin reuptake inhibitors (SSRIs), and stimulants (e.g., methylphenidate) for patients with DMDD. Of note, these medications are theoretically better suited for patients with DMDD than those diagnosed with bipolar disorder, as antidepressants and stimulants may risk triggering more labile moods or manic episodes in patients with bipolar disorder. Stimulant and antidepressant medications are prescribed both for their treatment of DMDD symptoms and in cases of comorbid ADHD and depressive disorders. Atypical antipsychotics that are especially efficacious with irritability, specifically risperidone and aripiprazole, are another primary intervention for children with DMDD, prescribed in as much as 58.9% of DMDD patients age 10–17. Risperidone, specifically, has been shown to have a strong effect on aggressive behavior. On the other hand, lithium, an anti-manic medication, and anticonvulsant medications, often implicated in the treatment of bipolar disorder, show moderate reduction of aggression in hospitalized children with conduct disorder, and are often prescribed to children with DMDD based on this history. A medication that is both anti-manic and anticonvulsant, valproate, has shown limited support for treating the mood dysregulation seen in DMDD. On the other hand, some research has found that lithium has not been shown to outperform a placebo in alleviating the signs and symptoms of DMDD.

Without specific U.S. FDA approval for any drug to treat DMDD, there is variability in the treatments of DMDD due to the limited data on DMDD and the selection of treatments based on other mental disorders. Overall, the high comorbidity of DMDD makes treatments complicated, and usually a combination of psychopharmacology and psychotherapeutic interventions are required.

=== Psychotherapeutic ===
Psychotherapeutic treatments, including behavioral therapies and parent training, are important aspects of treating DMDD. Because many youths with DMDD show problems with ADHD and ODD, experts initially tried to treat these children using contingency management, an intervention which involves teaching parents to reinforce children's appropriate behavior and extinguish (usually through systematic ignoring or time out) inappropriate behavior. Although contingency management can be helpful for ADHD and ODD symptoms, it does not seem to reduce the most salient features of DMDD, namely, irritability and anger.

Instead, some evidence suggests that cognitive behavioral therapy (CBT) may be an effective treatment, especially in adolescents, in that it teaches children with DMDD how to handle the thoughts and feelings that causing depressed or anxious moods. CBT often includes exposing the child to situations that cause them frustration to allow them to learn coping skills on how to tolerate the frustrations better and control their anger and outbursts. Similarly, dialectical behavior therapy for pre-adolescent children (DBT-C) can also be used in children with DMDD to help them regulate emotions to avoid outbursts. Parent training programs are also a vital component to the mix of psychotherapeutic approaches, especially in children. Such parent training programs teach caregivers strategies to anticipate, prevent, and respond to irritable behavior and temper outbursts to promote predictability and consistency and to reward positive behavior. Other possible interventions also include computer-based training and Adlerian Play Therapy (AdPT). Computer-based training intervention is a new approach that is currently in its early stages of research, but is being tested to use mobile and computer-based platforms to with certain DMDD symptoms. AdPT is a therapy that integrates both directive and non-directive play techniques as a way to help children rehearse changes in the perceptions, attitudes, and behaviors during play by using language and/or metaphors that can reduce disruptive behaviors seen in DMDD in the classroom.

== Epidemiology ==
There are no good estimates of the prevalence of DMDD, but primary studies have found a rate of 0.8–3.3% and a literature review estimated about 1.6% prevalence rate in children under the age of 13 years old. Epidemiological studies show that approximately 3.2% of children in the community have chronic problems with irritability and temper, the essential features of DMDD. These problems are probably more common among clinic-referred youths. Parents report that approximately 30% of children hospitalized for psychiatric problems meet diagnostic criteria for DMDD; 15% meet criteria based on the observations of hospital staff.

== History ==
Disruptive mood dysregulation disorder developed from a controversy regarding the clinical diagnosis of bipolar disorder in children. The broad application of diagnostic criteria that constituted pediatric bipolar disorder was applied to children with severe, persistent, chronic irritability as well as temper outbursts even in the absence of distinct episodic mania or hypomania, a hallmark of bipolar disorder.

In 2003, researcher Ellen Leibenluft and her colleagues identified a "broad phenotype" of mania in juveniles, characterized by chronic, nonepisodic irritability and symptoms consistent with hyperarousal.

Following these findings, the National Institute of Mental Health (NIMH) created a related research concept known as severe mood dysregulation. SMD was not a diagnosis in the DSM-IV, but was instead utilized to develop systematic studies of children whose chronic irritability had an otherwise dubious relationship with bipolar disorder.

Studies drawing upon longitudinal and family-history analysis produced a distinction between the concept of SMD and narrowly defined diagnostic criteria for bipolar disorder. Juveniles exhibiting chronic, episodic irritability were more likely to develop anxiety or depressive disorders as opposed to bipolar disorder. A pattern of episodic mania and a family history of bipolar disorder were more strongly associated with eventual diagnoses of pediatric bipolar disorder.

During the initial development of what was to become the DSM-V, the proposed diagnosis was labeled temper dysregulation disorder with dysphoria before being renamed to disruptive mood dysregulation disorder (DMDD).

The American Psychiatric Association added DMDD to the DSM-V in 2013, under the category of depressive disorders. The stated rationale for the addition was to address the concerns of overdiagnosis and overtreatment of bipolar disorder in children displaying persistent irritability as well a lack of control in episodes of severe behavior.

The diagnosis was controversial in its development. Professionals raised concerns of whether enough evidence was available from previous research efforts (mainly focused on SMD) to establish DMDD as a separate disorder. Critics also noted the diagnostic overlap between DMDD and ODD (oppositional defiant disorder) and other pediatric disorders.

With the release of the DSM-V, DMDD was integrated into clinical practice. A study of electronic health records from 2008 through 2018 found nearly 8,000 patients ages 10-17 diagnosed with DMDD. The study also concluded that the rate of new treatment episodes for DMDD was 54% higher than equivalent rates for pediatric bipolar disorder.

A separate study utilizing Kentucky Medicaid insurance claims found an increasing use of DMDD after 2013 and a concurrent decline in diagnoses of mood disorder not otherwise specified; although the authors cautioned that administrative insurance claims and geographic parameters of the data limited generalization to a larger population.
