= Irritability =

Tendency of organisms in response to environmental change

- Specialty: Psychiatry

Irritability is the excitatory ability that living organisms have to respond to changes in their environment. The term is used for both the physiological reaction to stimuli and for the pathological, abnormal or excessive sensitivity to stimuli.

When reflecting human emotion and behavior, it is commonly defined as the tendency to react to stimuli with negative affective states (especially anger) and temper outbursts, which can be aggressive. Distressing or impairing irritability is important from a mental health perspective as a common symptom of concern and predictor of clinical outcomes.

== Definition ==
Irritability is the intrinsic ability that living organisms have to respond to changes in their environment. The term is used for both the physiological reaction to stimuli and for the pathological, abnormal or excessive sensitivity to stimuli. Irritability can be demonstrated in behavioral responses to both physiological and behavioral stimuli, including environmental, situational, sociological, and emotional stimuli.

In humans, irritability may be a significant transdiagnostic symptom or disposition that occurs across or at any point during the lifespan. It is commonly defined as the tendency to react to stimuli with the experience of negative affective states (especially anger) and temper outbursts, which may or may not be aggressive. This definition is well known to have similarities with the definitions of anger and aggression. New hypotheses and data-driven research are focused on identifying what is unique to irritability, anger, and aggression. The definition is broad. It is also consistent with special definitions that are relevant to research and treatment. One definition is that irritability is a low threshold for experiencing frustration. This definition is helpful for experiments because researchers can induce frustration by blocking desired rewards or doling out unexpected punishments. However, it is not particularly specific to irritability, as frustration is its own construct with a number of emotional and behavioral associations. A second prominent special definition describes a group of behavioral issues often occurring in those diagnosed with an autism spectrum disorder. This deserves mention here because this version of irritability has been a commonly used in a number of clinical trials and defines the current US Food and Drug Administration irritability indication.

== Signs and symptoms ==
As an emotional and behavioral symptom in humans, someone is considered to be irritable when they have a short temper, become easily frustrated, or feel grouchy or grumpy. Caregivers may report tension in the household or fatigue. They may make accommodations to avoid provoking their dependents. Irritability is associated with a number of mental health conditions. It is a defining characteristic of any mood disorder, such as bipolar, depressive, and disruptive mood dysregulation disorders. It is also a major feature of a number of other disorders, including autism spectrum disorders, traumatic stress disorders, generalized anxiety disorder, etc. Finally, it is a notable characteristic of delirium, dementia, hormonal change, metabolic disturbance, chronic stress, pain, and substance/medication withdrawal.

Of course, given that irritability is not specific to any one condition, clinicians consider biological, social, psychological, and familial factors. Irritability may be an indicator of diagnosis, course of illness, or prognosis. For example, a major concern for clinicians is the time course of irritability. If a person presents as uncharacteristically irritable, then a clinician may become concerned a change or episodic illness, such as a neurologic insult or mood disorder. Understanding the time course of irritability is critical for establishing the diagnosis of pediatric bipolar disorder from disruptive mood dysregulation disorder. In another example, chronic, severe irritability in older children (not including young children, e.g. preschool age, where normative irritability may be severe) may predict later depression and anxiety and suicidality.

== Neurophysiology ==
Several major neural systems have been implicated across a number of studies for idiopathic, chronic irritability. These include the following:

1. prefrontal areas that underlying complex, goal directed behavior, especially inhibitory control and the regulation of emotions;
2. cortico-subcortical systems underlying reward processing, particularly in reaction to a frustrating stimulus; and
3. cortico-subcortical systems underlying threat and arousal processing, particularly in the context of social fairness or social threat.

== See also ==
- Aggression
- Annoyance
- Resentment
- Disruptive mood dysregulation disorder
- Oppositional defiant disorder
