= Operation Vigilant Eagle =

Operation Vigilant Eagle is an American law-enforcement effort headed by the FBI aimed at identifying and preventing violence from white supremacists and "militia/sovereign-citizen extremist groups". The operation was first mentioned in the Wall Street Journal in April 2009.

Operation Vigilant Eagle exists as part of a larger national security effort to target individuals associated with "Left Wing" and "Right Wing" extremist groups. Example include members of (Tea Party movements), citizen militia (Occupy movements), and other anti-government groups. In certain cases targets have been labeled as mentally ill with "oppositional-defiance disorder", and more cases show that veterans are being targeted since the beginning of Operation Vigilant Eagle and the cause could be as simple as posting controversial song lyrics and political views on Facebook.
