= Murder of Aaron Howard =

2018 shooting in Abilene, Texas

Shooting of Aaron Howard
- Aaron Howard, c. 2018
- Location: Abilene, Texas, U.S.
- Date: September 1, 2018; 8 years ago
- Attack type: Shooting
- Weapons: Smith & Wesson handgun Shotgun
- Deaths: 1
- Victim: Aaron Kristopher Howard
- Perpetrators: Johnnie Dee Allen Miller; Michael Theodore Miller
- Motive: Rivalry
- Verdict: Pleaded not guilty
- Convictions: First-degree murder
- Sentence: 14 years imprisonment with the possibility of parole after serving 7 years (Johnnie Miller); Not guilty (Michael Miller)
- Judge: Thomas Wheeler

On September 1, 2018, 37-year-old Aaron Kristopher Howard was fatally shot by 67-year-old Johnnie Dee Allen Miller and his son, 31-year-old Michael Theodore Miller in an alley outside his home in Abilene, Texas. The shooting occurred following a dispute over a dirty mattress.

Howard's wife, 34-year-old Kara Box (later Muntean), recorded the incident while attempting to report the Millers to the police. The footage went viral on the Internet, with many nicknaming Johnnie and Michael the "Dumpster Defenders". Some claimed Howard was murdered, while others claimed the Millers acted in self-defense.

On January 27, 2023, Johnnie was sentenced to fourteen years imprisonment with the possibility of parole after serving seven years. Michael was found not guilty.

== Background ==
Aaron Kristopher Howard was born c. 1980-1981. In 2017, he began dating Kara Box, and they had children. Howard had a series of mental health and anger issues due to his intermittent explosive disorder, which he took medication for. Howard had a lengthy criminal record prior to the incident, including 38 potential instances of assault, harassment, sexual assault, and threats; the earliest instance dating to June 30, 1998. On one occasion, Howard was reported to the police by numerous neighbors for fighting and choking a friend he lived with, Justin Campbell, in the front yard of their residence.

In May 2018, Howard was charged for threatening a public servant after he threatened to kill a code enforcement officer for trespassing on his property, when the officer was called to the house for complaints of health-code violations. Four days prior to the shooting, Howard verbally abused a mailman trying to deliver a package because he believed the mailman was trying to peek inside his daughter's window. The mailman then called supervisors and Howard threatened to kill him.

Howard reportedly never had any interactions with the Miller family prior to the shooting.

== Shooting ==
On September 1, 2018, Howard and his family were planning to unload items from a trailer so it could be used for another project. The items, said to include scrap metal, were placed in their backyard. The Millers and Howard resided in adjacent houses, with a shared trash container between them. While unloading, Howard noticed a dirty mattress that he previously placed in the container was removed and placed against their fence, which angered him. Howard then placed the mattress back inside the container, and began shouting at the Miller family across their backyard while they were inside their home, leading to an argument between Howard and Johnnie. Johnnie later stepped out of his house armed with a Smith & Wesson handgun, while Michael stepped out armed with a shotgun. Howard was armed with a baseball bat. Howard's children were allegedly watching from the windows of their residence, while some of his family members were allegedly watching from inside a nearby car. Campbell was also watching while standing next to Box, however he is not visible in the video of the incident.

Shortly after, Box began filming the dispute. Howard began to cuss the two men out, claiming; "You pulled a gun in front of my kids, over a fucking mattress! Fuck you!" Howard would consistently threaten to kill the two men, with Johnnie replying with; "Take a swing! Go ahead, take your swing!" The three proceeded to argue for about two minutes, before Johnnie fired two shots, both striking Howard in the chest. Howard would immediately throw the baseball bat at him, knocking him back. Michael would retaliate by shooting Howard once in the head. Box would rush to him screaming, before ending the recording. The Millers then held Box and Campbell hostage until police arrived. They ordered the two to drop their weapons and were arrested. Paramedics, with police assisting, treated Howard in the alley and he was taken to a local hospital by ambulance. He was later pronounced dead.

Both Millers were offered plea deals of 25 years, and neither accepted. In April 2019, the two were bailed out on a $25,000 bond. When police discovered the video of the incident, they were re-arrested and held on a $250,000 bond. That was later dropped to a $100,000 bond, and they were bailed out again.

== Trial ==
The trial was delayed multiple times due to the COVID-19 pandemic. The trial began at the Taylor County Courthouse on January 24, 2023. Johnnie's wife, Laurie Miller, was the first to testify in court. The Millers' defense team spoke to jurors after watching Muntean's (formerly Box) video of the incident, claiming that due to Johnnie's age, he would likely die in prison. The defense’s closing argument to the jurors was that the killing was in self defense. The video was also shown to the courtroom.

One of Howard's neighbors testified that she saw Howard drag Muntean by her hair and slam her onto the ground. The neighbor claimed he was a "threat." Justin Campbell testified calling Howard "aggressive" and "intimidating." Kara Muntean also testified, claiming he was "lovable, kind and funny." Muntean also claimed that she still has nightmares of the incident, and tends to wake up screaming. The prosecution team led by Erin Stamey said Howard was prone to outbursts but none before had resulted in physical harm. He had taken his medication the morning of the shooting.

On January 27, 2023, Johnnie was convicted of first-degree murder. Michael was found not guilty. Johnnie was sentenced to 14 years imprisonment with the possibility of parole after serving 7 years. His earliest possible release date is June 16, 2029, and his latest possible release date is June 16, 2036. He was given credit for time served in jail pre-trial.
