= Lee Anna Clark =

American psychologist

- Notable work: Schedule for Nonadaptive and Adaptive Personality (SNAP); Positive and Negative Affect Schedule (PANAS)
- Spouse: David Watson
- Scientific career
- Fields: Psychology

Lee Anna Clark (born 1951) is an American psychologist and the William J. and Dorothy K. O'Neill Professor of Psychology Emerita at the University of Notre Dame. She previously served as a professor and collegiate fellow at the University of Iowa, where she directed the clinical training program from 1996 to 1998 and again from 2006 to 2009, received the 2006 Regents' Award for Faculty Excellence, and also served as Associate Provost for Faculty from 1998 to 2005. Before her appointment at the University of Iowa, Clark was an assistant professor (1984–1990) and then associate professor (1990–1993) of psychology at Southern Methodist University in Dallas, Texas. Her research examines personality and temperament, dimensional models of personality pathology, clinical assessment, psychometrics, and the structure of psychopathology including mood, anxiety, and depression.

== Biography ==
Clark completed a Bachelor of Arts in psycholinguistics in the College Scholar Program at Cornell University in 1972. She taught English at Sapporo Medical College in Japan from 1972 to 1975 before returning to Cornell to earn a Master of Arts in Asian studies with a specialization in Japan in 1977. Clark obtained her PhD in clinical psychology from the University of Minnesota in 1982. From 1982 to 1984, she completed a postdoctoral research fellowship in the Department of Psychiatry at the Washington University School of Medicine. She is married to psychologist David Watson, with whom she has frequently collaborated.

Clark served as president of the Society for a Science of Clinical Psychology (SSCP) in 2008 and of the Society for Research in Psychopathology (SRP) in 2012, and served as Federation Vice-President of the International Society for the Study of Personality Disorders from 2020 to 2023. She was an executive board member for the Association for Research in Personality from 2005 to 2009. She served as a member of the Personality and Personality Disorders Workgroup for the DSM-5. In this role, Clark contributed directly to the development of the alternative DSM-5 model for personality disorders and continues to publish research evaluating its prevalence, convergence with the legacy model of personality disorder, and clinical utility. She also participated in the World Health Organization working group to develop the ICD-11 classification of personality disorders.

She authored the Schedule for Nonadaptive and Adaptive Personality (SNAP), an objective personality questionnaire used in psychological assessment. With David Watson, Clark developed the Positive and Negative Affect Schedule (PANAS) and the tripartite model of anxiety and depression, contributing to a shift toward dimensional models of psychopathology based on underlying mood and temperament traits. Clark also co-authored the paper that introduced the Hierarchical Taxonomy of Psychopathology (HiTOP), an alternative quantitative framework for classifying mental illness. She has also collaborated on large-scale analyses defining the structure of personality pathology through both general and specific diagnostic factors.

Clark has published over 300 peer-reviewed articles, books, and chapters. She has been identified as a highly cited researcher by the Institute for Scientific Information. Her research earned the Society for Personality and Social Psychology Jack Block Award for Distinguished Research in Personality in 2016. Clark received the Zubin Award for Lifetime Contributions to the Understanding of Psychopathology from the SRP in 2017. The International Society for the Study of Personality Disorder awarded her the John Gunderson Senior Researcher Award in 2019. In 2023, she received the Senior Investigator Award from the North American Society for the Study of Personality Disorder. In 2020, she was elected to the Heritage Wall of Fame of the Society for Personality and Social Psychology.

== Selected publications ==
- Clark, L. A. (2007). Assessment and diagnosis of personality disorder: Perennial issues and an emerging reconceptualization. Annual Review of Psychology, 58, 227–257.
- Clark, L. A. (2022). Evolving convictions through dogged pursuit of answers and large dollops of luck: My piece in the world of personality and psychopathology assessment. In Christopher Hopwood (Ed.), The evolution of personality assessment in the 21st century: Understanding the people who understand people (pp. 260-292). Philadelphia: Routledge.
- Clark, L. A., & Watson, D. (1991). Tripartite model of anxiety and depression: psychometric evidence and taxonomic implications. Journal of Abnormal Psychology, 100(3), 316-336.
- Clark, L. A., & Watson, D. (1995). Constructing validity: Basic issues in objective scale development. Psychological Assessment, 7(3), 309-319.
- Clark, L. A., & Watson, D. (2022). The trait model of the DSM–5 alternative model of personality disorder (AMPD): A structural review. Personality Disorders: Theory, Research, and Treatment, 13(4), 328-336.
- Clark, L. A., Watson, D., & Mineka, S. (1994). Temperament, personality, and the mood and anxiety disorders. Journal of Abnormal Psychology, 103(1), 103-116.
- Watson, D., & Clark, L. A. (1984). Negative affectivity: the disposition to experience aversive emotional states. Psychological Bulletin, 96(3), 465-490.
- Watson, D., Clark, L. A., & Tellegen, A. (1988). Development and validation of brief measures of positive and negative affect: the PANAS scales. Journal of Personality and Social Psychology, 54(6), 1063-1070.
