= Intermittent explosive disorder =

Mental disorder characterized by anger

- Other names: Episodic dyscontrol syndrome (EDS), dyscontrol
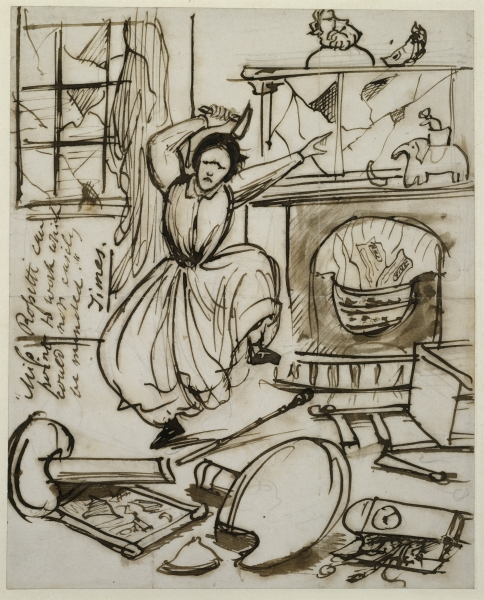
- Cartoon of Christina Rossetti in a fit of anger, drawn by her brother Dante (1862).
- Specialty: Psychiatry
- Symptoms: Explosive outbursts of anger or violence, often to the point of rage, that are disproportionate to the situation at hand
- Differential diagnosis: Alcoholism, post-traumatic stress disorder, bipolar disorder, antisocial personality disorder
- Treatment: Cognitive behavioral therapy, medication
- Frequency: 3%

Intermittent explosive disorder (IED), or episodic dyscontrol syndrome (EDS), is a mental disorder characterized by explosive outbursts of anger or violence, often to the point of rage, that are disproportionate to the situation (e.g., impulsive shouting, screaming, or excessive reprimanding triggered by relatively inconsequential events). Impulsive aggression is not premeditated, and is defined by a disproportionate reaction to any provocation, real or perceived, that would often be associated with a choleric temperament. Some individuals have reported affective changes prior to an outburst, such as tension, mood changes, and energy changes.

The disorder is currently categorized in the Diagnostic and Statistical Manual of Mental Disorders, Fifth Edition (DSM-5) under the "Disruptive, Impulse-Control, and Conduct Disorders" category and classified in ICD-11 under "impulse-control disorders". The disorder itself is not easily characterized and often exhibits comorbidity with other mood disorders, particularly bipolar disorder. Individuals diagnosed with IED report their outbursts as being brief (lasting less than an hour), with a variety of bodily symptoms (sweating, stuttering, chest tightness, twitching, palpitations) reported by a third of one sample. Aggressive acts are frequently reported to be accompanied by a sensation of substantial relief or euphoria, and, in some cases, pleasure, but often followed by later remorse. Individuals with IED can experience different challenges depending on the severity and type of personality traits they have.

== Pathophysiology ==
Impulsive behavior, and especially impulsive violence predisposition, have been correlated to a low brain serotonin turnover rate, indicated by a low concentration of 5-hydroxyindoleacetic acid (5-HIAA) in the cerebrospinal fluid (CSF). This substrate appears to act on the suprachiasmatic nucleus in the hypothalamus, which is the target for serotonergic output from the dorsal and median raphe nuclei playing a role in maintaining the circadian rhythm and regulation of blood sugar. A tendency towards low 5-HIAA may be hereditary. A putative hereditary component to low CSF 5-HIAA and concordantly possibly to impulsive violence has been proposed. Other traits that correlate with IED are low vagal tone and increased insulin secretion. A suggested explanation for IED is a polymorphism of the gene for tryptophan hydroxylase, which produces a serotonin precursor; this genotype is found more commonly in individuals with impulsive behavior.

IED may also be associated with damage or lesions in the prefrontal cortex, with damage to these areas, including the amygdala and hippocampus, increasing the incidences of impulsive and aggressive behavior and the inability to predict the outcomes of an individual's own actions. Lesions in these areas are also associated with improper blood sugar control, leading to decreased brain function in these areas, which are associated with planning and decision making. A national sample in the United States estimated that 16 million Americans may fit the criteria for IED.

EDS was associated with limbic system diseases, disorders of the temporal lobe, or abuse of alcohol or other psychoactive substances.

== Diagnosis ==
=== ICD-11 ===
With the ICD-11 coming into effect in 2022, Intermittent explosive disorder is listed as a separate disorder for the first time. It is classified under impulse-control disorders.

=== DSM-5 diagnosis ===
The current DSM-5 criteria for Intermittent Explosive Disorder include:

- Recurrent outbursts that demonstrate an inability to control impulses, including either of the following:
  - Verbal aggression (tantrums, verbal arguments, or fights) or physical aggression that occurs twice in a week-long period for at least three months and does not lead to the destruction of property or physical injury (Criterion A1)
  - Three outbursts that involve injury or destruction within a year-long period (Criterion A2)
- Aggressive behavior is grossly disproportionate to the magnitude of the psychosocial stressors (Criterion B)
- The outbursts are not premeditated and serve no premeditated purpose (Criterion C)
- The outbursts cause distress or impairment of functioning or lead to financial or legal consequences (Criterion D)
- The individual must be at least six years old (Criterion E)
- The recurrent outbursts cannot be explained by another mental disorder and are not the result of another medical disorder or substance use (Criterion F)

DSM-5 now includes two separate criteria for types of aggressive outbursts (A1 and A2) which have empirical support:

- Criterion A1: Episodes of verbal and/or non-damaging, nondestructive, or non-injurious physical assault that occur, on average, twice weekly for three months. These could include temper tantrums, tirades, verbal arguments/fights, or assault without damage. This criterion includes high frequency/low-intensity outbursts.
- Criterion A2: More severe destructive/assaultive episodes which are more infrequent and occur, on average, three times within a twelve-month period. These could be destroying an object without regard to value or assaulting an animal or individual. This criterion includes high-intensity/low-frequency outbursts.

=== DSM-IV diagnosis ===
The past DSM-IV criteria for IED were similar to the current criteria, however, verbal aggression was not considered as part of the diagnostic criteria. The DSM-IV diagnosis was characterized by the occurrence of discrete episodes of failure to resist aggressive impulses that result in violent assault or destruction of property. Additionally, the degree of aggressiveness expressed during an episode should be grossly disproportionate to provocation or precipitating psychosocial stressor, and, as previously stated, diagnosis is made when certain other mental disorders have been ruled out, e.g., a head injury, Alzheimer's disease, etc., or due to substance use or medication. Diagnosis is made using a psychiatric interview to affective and behavioral symptoms to the criteria listed in the DSM-IV.

The DSM-IV-TR was very specific in its definition of Intermittent Explosive Disorder which was defined, essentially, by the exclusion of other conditions. The diagnosis required:

1. several episodes of impulsive behavior that result in serious damage to either persons or property, wherein
2. the degree of the aggressiveness is grossly disproportionate to the circumstances or provocation, and
3. the episodic violence cannot be better accounted for by another mental or physical medical condition.

EDS was a category in the Diagnostic and Statistical Manual of Mental Disorders (DSM IV). EDS may affect children or adults. Children are often considered to have epilepsy or a mental health problem. The episodes consist of recurrent attacks of uncontrollable rage, usually after minimal provocation, and may last up to an hour. Following an episode, children are frequently exhausted, may sleep and will usually have no recall.

=== Differential diagnosis ===
Many psychiatric disorders and some substance use disorders are associated with increased aggression and are frequently comorbid with IED, often making differential diagnosis difficult. Individuals with IED are, on average, four times more likely to develop depression or anxiety disorders, and three times more likely to develop substance use disorders. Bipolar disorder has been linked to increased agitation and aggressive behavior in some individuals, but for these individuals, aggression is limited to manic or depressive episodes, whereas individuals with IED experience aggressive behavior even during periods with a neutral or positive mood.

In one clinical study, bipolar and IED disorders co-occurred 60% of the time. Patients report manic-like symptoms occurring just before outbursts and continuing throughout. According to a study, the average onset age of IED was around five years earlier than the onset age of bipolar disorder, indicating a possible correlation between the two.

Similarly, alcoholism and other substance use disorders may exhibit increased aggression, but unless it is experienced outside of periods of acute intoxication and withdrawal, no diagnosis of IED is given. Studies suggest that childhood abuse and alcohol use disorder are linked to increased aggression and IED. For chronic disorders, such as post-traumatic stress disorder (PTSD), it is important to assess whether the level of aggression met IED criteria before the development of another disorder. In antisocial personality disorder (ASPD), interpersonal aggression is usually instrumental in nature (i.e., motivated by tangible rewards), whereas IED is more of an impulsive, unpremeditated reaction to situational stress.

== Treatment ==
Although there is no cure, treatment is attempted through cognitive behavioral therapy and psychotropic medication regimens, though the pharmaceutical options have shown limited success. Therapy aids in helping the patient recognize the impulses in hopes of achieving a level of awareness and control of the outbursts, along with treating the emotional stress that accompanies these episodes. Multiple drug regimens are frequently indicated for IED patients. Cognitive Relaxation and Coping Skills Therapy (CRCST) has shown preliminary success in both group and individual settings compared to waitlist control groups. This therapy consists of 12 sessions, the first three focusing on relaxation training, then cognitive restructuring, then exposure therapy. The final sessions focus on resisting aggressive impulses and other preventative measures.

In France, antipsychotics such as cyamemazine, levomepromazine, and loxapine are sometimes used.

Tricyclic antidepressants and selective serotonin reuptake inhibitors (SSRIs, including fluoxetine, fluvoxamine, and sertraline) appear to alleviate some pathopsychological symptoms. Mood stabilizers and anticonvulsant drugs such as gabapentin, lithium, carbamazepine, and valproate seem to aid in controlling the incidence of outbursts. Anxiolytics help alleviate tension and may help reduce explosive outbursts by increasing the provocative stimulus tolerance threshold, and are especially indicated in patients with comorbid obsessive–compulsive disorder or other anxiety disorders.

=== Former treatments for EDS ===
Treatment for EDS usually involved treating the underlying causative factor(s). This may involve psychotherapy, or medical treatment for diseases.

EDS has been successfully controlled in clinical trials using prescribed medications, including carbamazepine, ethosuximide, and propranolol.

There have been few randomised controlled trials of treatment of EDS/IED. Antidepressants and mood stabilizers including lithium, valproate, and carbamazepine have been used in adults, and occasionally in children with oppositional defiant disorder or conduct disorder to reduce aggression. Cognitive behavioural therapy (CBT) is effective in the treatment of anger. A recent trial randomised adults with IED to 12 weeks of individual therapy, group therapy or waiting list (no therapy). Intervention resulted in an improvement in anger and aggression levels, with no difference between group and individual CBT. Adolescents and young adults may experience educational and social consequences, but also mental health problems if IED/EDS is undiagnosed in early childhood.

== Epidemiology ==
Two epidemiological studies of community samples approximated the lifetime prevalence of IED to be 4–6%, depending on the criteria set used. A Ukrainian study found comparable rates of lifetime IED (4.2%), suggesting that a lifetime prevalence of IED of 4–6% is not limited to American samples. One-month and one-year point prevalences of IED in these studies were reported as 2.0% and 2.7%, respectively. Extrapolating to the national level, 16.2 million Americans would have IED during their lifetimes and as many as 10.5 million in any year and 6 million in any month.

Among a clinical population, a 2005 study found the lifetime prevalence of IED to be 6.3%.

Prevalence appears to be higher in men than in women.

Of US subjects with IED, 67.8% had engaged in direct interpersonal aggression, 20.9% in threatened interpersonal aggression, and 11.4% in aggression against objects. Subjects reported engaging in 27.8 high-severity aggressive acts during their worst year, with 2–3 outbursts requiring medical attention. Across the lifespan, the mean value of property damage due to aggressive outbursts was $1603.

A study in the March 2016 Journal of Clinical Psychiatry suggests a relationship between infection with the parasite Toxoplasma gondii and psychiatric aggression such as IED.

== Legal implications ==
A diagnosis of EDS has been used as a defense in court for persons accused of committing violent crimes including murder.

== History ==
In the first edition of the American Psychiatric Association's Diagnostic and Statistical Manual of Mental Disorders (DSM-I), a disorder of impulsive aggression was referred to as a passive-aggressive personality type (aggressive type). This construct was characterized by a "persistent reaction to frustration are "generally excitable, aggressive, and over-responsive to environmental pressures" with "gross outbursts of rage or of verbal or physical aggressiveness different from their usual behavior".

In the third edition, the DSM-III, this was for the first time codified as intermittent explosive disorder and assigned clinical disorder status under Axis I. However, some researchers saw the criteria as poorly operationalized. About 80% of individuals who would now be diagnosed with the disorder would have been excluded.

In the DSM-IV, the criteria were improved but still lacked objective criteria for the intensity, frequency, and nature of aggressive acts to meet criteria for IED. This led some researchers to adopt alternate criteria set with which to conduct research, known as the IED-IR (Integrated Research). The severity and frequency of aggressive behavior required for the diagnosis were clearly operationalized, the aggressive acts were required to be impulsive in nature, subjective distress was required to precede the explosive outbursts, and the criteria allowed for comorbid diagnoses with borderline personality disorder and antisocial personality disorder.

In the current version, the DSM-5, the disorder appears under the "Disruptive, Impulse-Control, and Conduct Disorders" category. In the DSM-IV, physical aggression was required to meet the criteria for the disorder, but these criteria were modified in the DSM-5 to include verbal aggression and non-destructive/noninjurious physical aggression. The listing was also updated to specify frequency criteria. Further, aggressive outbursts are now required to be impulsive in nature and must cause marked distress, impairment, or negative consequences for the individual. Individuals must be at least six years old to receive the diagnosis. The text also clarified the disorder's relationship to other disorders such as attention deficit hyperactivity disorder (ADHD) and disruptive mood dysregulation disorder.

== See also ==
- Passive–aggressive personality disorder
