= Schedule for Nonadaptive and Adaptive Personality =

- Purpose: assess personality disorder

The Schedule for Nonadaptive and Adaptive Personality (SNAP) is a self-reporting questionnaire for assessment of personality disorders (Axis II of the Diagnostic and Statistical Manual of Mental Disorders) introduced in 1993 by Lee Anna Clark. It is not to be confused with SNAP-IV — the Swanson, Nolan, and Pelham Rating Scale, rev. 4.

Initially it was compiled from the DSM-III criteria. The questions are grouped into 15 scales. Twelve of them assess maladaptive personality: mistrust, self-harm, eccentric perceptions, aggression, manipulativeness, entitlement, detachment, exhibitionism, dependency, impulsivity, workaholism, propriety, and three assess rather broad traits: negative temperament, positive temperament, disinhibition, The convergence of SNAP with other independently developed tests, such as DAPP-BQ (Dimensional Assessment of Personality Pathology—Basic Questionnaire), are noted in literature.

One study provided some evidence for the test-retest reliability and predictive validity.
