= Boris Kotoff =

Profile
- Positions: Halfback, Fullback

Personal information
- Born: c. 1928; Hamilton, Ontario, Canada
- Listed height: 6 ft 0 in (1.83 m)
- Listed weight: 190 lb (86 kg)

Career history
- 1954–1957: Ottawa Rough Riders

Boris Kotoff (born c. 1928) is a Canadian former professional football player who played for the Ottawa Rough Riders. He previously played football in Hamilton, Ontario.

Kotoff was a fullback who played three years for Ottawa from 1954 to 1957. Kotoff was probably at training camp with Ottawa in 1957, but did not play in any regular season games. In 1958, Kotoff was in the Montreal training camp, but again did not play any regular season games. He ran for 132 yards in his career on 31 attempts, scoring 1 rushing touchdown. He also caught 7 passes for 106 yards.
