= Elena Kotova =

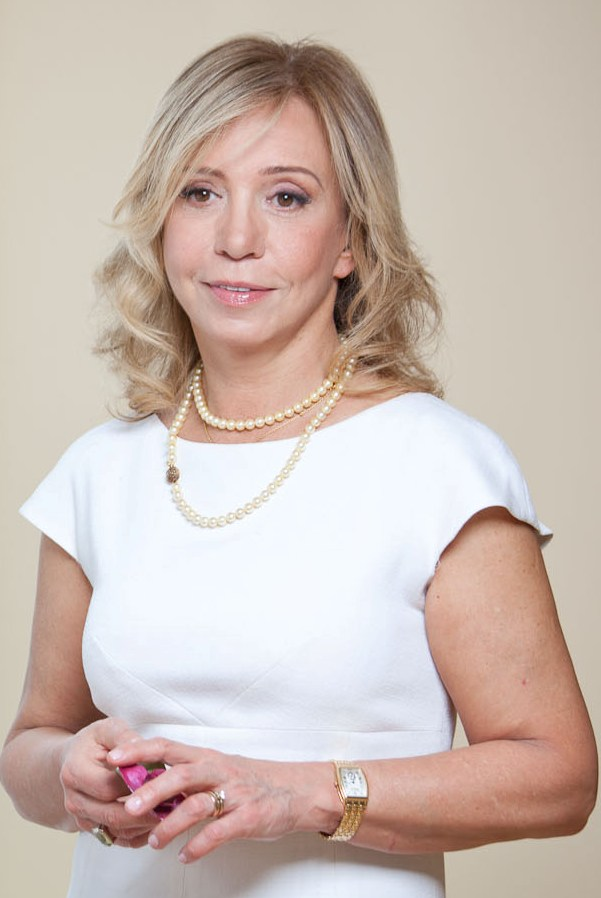
Elena Kotova (2011)

Elena Kotova (born November 21, 1956) is a Russian writer, interior architect, and private real estate developer. She worked as an international financer and held senior banking positions in Russia, USA, and Europe from 1994 to 2010. She was charged with soliciting a bribe in 2013 and given a suspended five-year jail sentence in 2014.

== Biography ==
Kotova was born on November 21, 1956, in Moscow. She is the daughter of Victor Kotov and Natalia Kotova. She studied at Moscow State University.

From 1982 to 1989, she worked as a researcher in the Institute of Oriental Studies, USSR Academy of Science, studying socio-economic problems of Asian countries and international finance. She authored 2 scientific monographs and over 50 articles on international financial issues.

In 1990, she became an elected public official in the first democratic elections in the country. She was named a deputy of the Moscow City Council and a Chairperson of the committee on economic policy.

From 1990 to 1992, she served as chairperson of the Moscow State Property Agency and privatization. From 1993 to 1997, she worked at the International Monetary Fund and the World Bank.

From 1998 to 2005, she held management positions in Russian commercial banks in Moscow, including Vnesheconombank, Most Bank, Moscow bank for reconstruction and development (MBRD), and Vneshtorgbank (VTB).

From 2005 to 2010, she was a government-appointed representative of the Russian Federation on the board of directors of the European Bank for Reconstruction and Development (EBRD).

In summer 2010, the bank placed her under internal investigation, "apparently for corruption." In November 2010, the report was finished. In December 2010, the EBRD referred Kotova's case to the City of London Police and to the Russian authorities.

In January 2013, Kotova was charged in Moscow with attempting to solicit a US$1.4 million bribe. Kotova denied any wrongdoing.

In March 2013, Kotova was involuntary committed by the Russian prosecution to a psychiatric hospital in Russia for testing.

In 2014, Kotova was given a suspended five-year jail sentence which was cancelled by a statutory Amnesty before the sentence had come in force, thus annulling the conviction.

Kotova lived in Moscow, Russia., She now lives in Berlin, Germany She is married to Nick Zimin; they wedded in 1985. She has one son. Her personal interests include skiing, swimming, and dance.

Kotova has written six novels.

On March 23, 2016, Kotova was ordered by the High Court to comply with a civil recovery order to surrender suspected criminal assets, which included a £1.5 million Mayfair apartment and £230,000 held in bank accounts seized by the National Crime Agency
