= David Watson (psychologist) =

American personality psychologist

- Education: Santa Clara University; University of Minnesota
- Spouse: Lee Anna Clark
- Scientific career
- Fields: Psychology
- Institutions: Southern Methodist University; University of Iowa; University of Notre Dame
- Thesis: A Cross-Cultural Study of the Structure of Mood (1982)
- Doctoral students: Roman Kotov

David Watson is an American personality psychologist who has been the Andrew J. McKenna Family Professor of Psychology at the University of Notre Dame since 2010. He previously served as a professor of psychology at the University of Iowa beginning in 1993, and taught at Southern Methodist University before then. He was the founding president of the Association for Research in Personality in 2001 and served as editor-in-chief of the Journal of Abnormal Psychology from 2006 to 2011. He is known for his research on personality assessment and psychopathology, including working with his wife Lee Anna Clark and Auke Tellegen to develop the Positive and Negative Affect Schedule in 1988. In 2015, Watson received the Jack Block Award for Distinguished Research in Personality from the Society for Personality and Social Psychology.
