= Pavel Kotov (disambiguation) =

Pavel Kotov (born 1998) is a Russian tennis player.

Pavel Kotov may also refer to:

- Pavel Kotov (footballer) (born 1995), Russian footballer
- Pavel Kotov (canoeist) (born 1998), Russian slalom canoeist
