= Kirill Kotov =

Russian footballer and official

Personal information
- Full name: Kirill Nikolayevich Kotov
- Date of birth: 9 February 1983 (age 43)
- Place of birth: Moscow, Russian SFSR
- Height: 1.88 m (6 ft 2 in)
- Position: Midfielder

Youth career
- FC Spartak Moscow

Senior career*
Years	Team	Apps	(Gls)
2001	FC Anzhi Makhachkala	0	(0)
2002	FC Dynamo Makhachkala	12	(1)
2003	FC Vityaz Podolsk	2	(0)
2003	FC Reutov	11	(4)
2004	FC Arsenal Tula	17	(0)
2005	FC Reutov	26	(4)
2006	FC Saturn Moscow Oblast	0	(0)
2007	FC Reutov	26	(3)
2008–2009	FC MVD Rossii Moscow	47	(7)
2009	FC Zhemchuzhina-Sochi	12	(0)
2010	FC Dynamo Saint Petersburg	2	(0)

Managerial career
- 2012: FC Lokomotiv Moscow (scout)
- 2012–2014: FC Lokomotiv Moscow (head scout)
- 2014–2016: FC Lokomotiv Moscow (director of sports)
- 2017–2018: FC Baltika Kaliningrad (director of sports)
- 2020–2026: FC Fakel Voronezh (director of sports)
- * Club domestic league appearances and goals

Kirill Nikolayevich Kotov (Russian: Кирилл Николаевич Котов; born 9 February 1983) is a Russian professional football official and a former player.

== Club career ==
He made his Russian Football National League debut for FC Arsenal Tula on 31 March 2004 in a game against FC Sokol Saratov. He played two more seasons in the FNL for FC MVD Rossii Moscow and FC Dynamo Saint Petersburg.
