= Ellen Leibenluft =

American psychiatrist

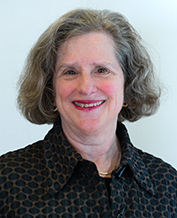
- Education: Yale College; Stanford University School of Medicine
- Scientific career
- Fields: Psychiatry, bipolar disorder, neuroscience
- Workplaces: Georgetown University Hospital; National Institute of Mental Health

Ellen Leibenluft is an American psychiatrist and physician-scientist researching the brain mechanisms mediating bipolar disorder and severe irritability in children and adolescents. She is a senior investigator and chief of the mood dysregulation and neuroscience section at the National Institute of Mental Health.

== Life ==
Leibenluft received a B.A. from Yale College, summa cum laude, and a M.D. from Stanford University School of Medicine. After completing residency training at Georgetown University Hospital, she served on the faculty there as director of the psychiatric inpatient unit and day hospital.

She came to the National Institute of Mental Health (NIMH) in 1989, and since that time has been conducting research on bipolar disorder. Leibenluft is a senior investigator and chief of the mood dysregulation and neuroscience section in the emotion and development branch at the NIMH intramural research program. Leibenluft's major research interests center on the brain mechanisms mediating bipolar disorder and severe irritability in children and adolescents. Her research focuses primarily on the brain mechanisms involved in bipolar disorder and severe irritability in children and adolescents. Her work involves the use of cognitive neuroscience techniques and neuroimaging modalities, primarily functional magnetic resonance imaging (MRI). She is also interested in novel treatment development for severe irritability, as well as the longitudinal course of both bipolar disorder and severe irritability in children. Leibenluft has won a number of honors, including the American Psychiatric Association Blanche F. Ittleson Award for Research in Child and Adolescent Psychiatry, the Litchfield Lecture at Oxford University, and the Michael Rutter Lecture of the Royal College of Psychiatrists. She is a deputy editor of the Journal of the American Academy of Child and Adolescent Psychiatry.

In 2018, Leibenluft was elected a member of the National Academy of Medicine for highlighting the need to carefully evaluate children who may have bipolar disorder; identifying chronic irritability, a new clinical problem which differs from pediatric bipolar disorder; and pioneering the use of cognitive neuroscience to address fundamental clinical questions on nosology and treatment of pediatric mental disorders.
