= Roman Kotov =

Clinical psychologist

- Education: Ohio State University; University of Iowa
- Known for: Psychiatric nosology
- Scientific career
- Fields: Clinical psychology
- Workplaces: Renaissance School of Medicine at Stony Brook University
- Thesis: Extension of the hierarchical model of anxiety and depression to the personality domain (2006)
- Doctoral advisor: David Watson

Roman I. Kotov is a clinical psychologist and professor in the Renaissance School of Medicine at Stony Brook University. His research focuses on the classification of mental disorders.

He is born in 1979 . He is known for his research on the classification and hierarchical structure of mental disorders and for his contributions to quantitative approaches in psychiatric nosology, including the development of the Hierarchical Taxonomy of Psychopathology (HiTOP). Kotov’s work spans longitudinal studies of psychopathology, the relationship between personality traits and psychiatric illnesses, and applications of advanced statistical and computational methods to mental health research. He has published extensively in leading psychiatric and psychological journals and serves as principal investigator on multiple major research projects funded by the National Institutes of Health and other agencies.
