= Sergei Kotov =

Sergei Kotov may refer to:

== People ==
- Sergey Kotov (counter admiral) (1912–1999), Russian admiral who gave his name to the Russian patrol ship Sergey Kotov
- Sergei Kotov (figure skater) (born 1985), Israeli former figure skater
- Sergei Kotov (footballer) (born 1982), Russian footballer

== Other uses ==
- Russian patrol ship Sergey Kotov, a ship sunk in March 2024
