= Conduct disorder =

Childhood behavioral disorder

- Other names: Conduct-dissocial disorder
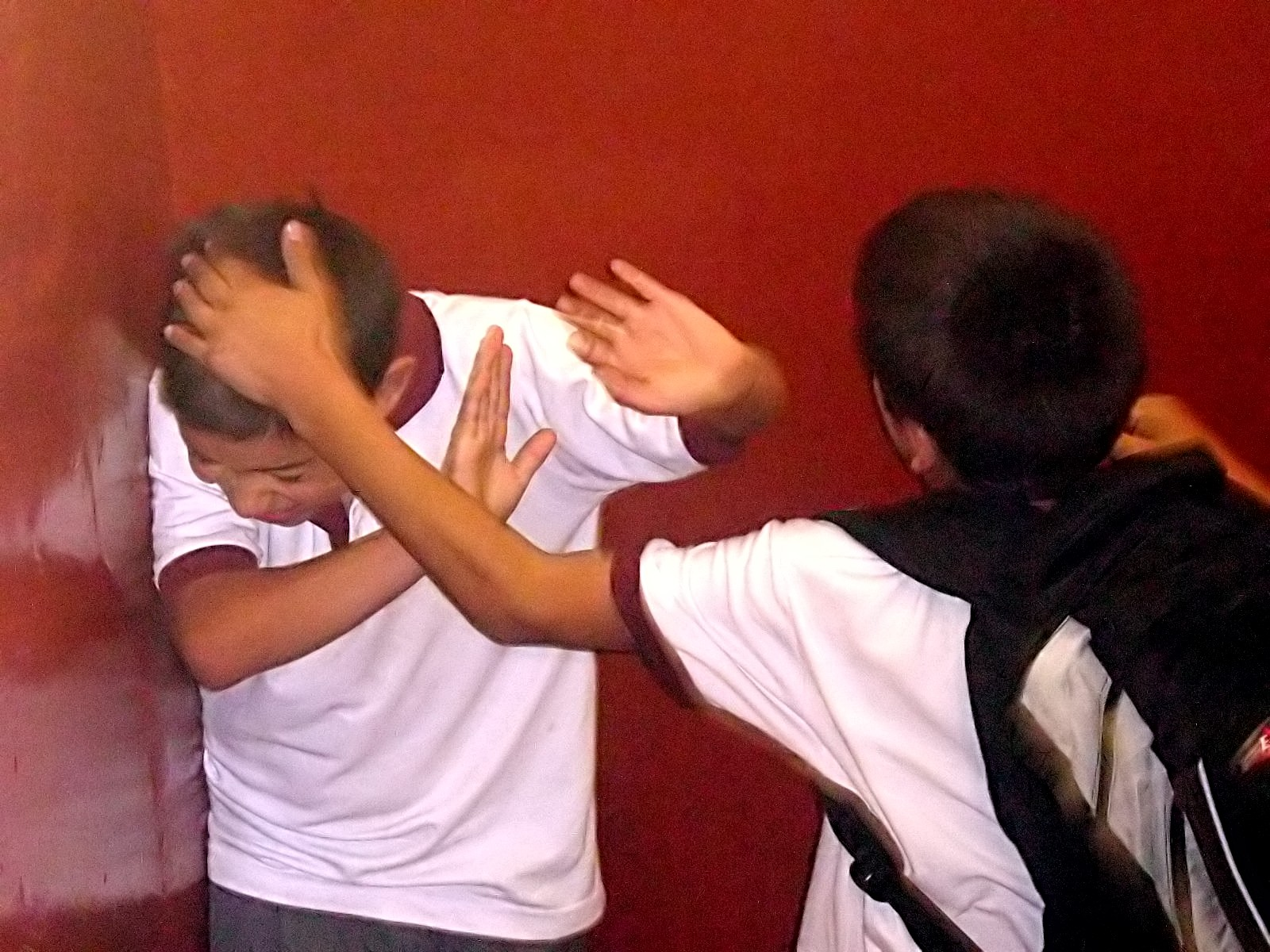
- Physical abuse and bullying, such as this boy attacking another boy, is a characteristic of a child with an established conduct disorder.
- Specialty: Psychiatry, pediatrics, clinical psychology
- Symptoms: Maliciousness, bullying, abuse, crime, delinquency, truancy, substance abuse, injury, impulsivity
- Complications: Sadomasochism, self-injury, crime, substance abuse, imprisonment, violence, antisocial personality disorder
- Risk factors: Attention deficit hyperactivity disorder, schizophrenia, substance abuse, fetal alcohol syndrome, child physical abuse, maternal smoking during pregnancy, domestic violence, sexual bullying, molestation
- Diagnostic method: Through a prolonged pattern of antisocial behaviour such as serious violation of laws, social norms, and rules in people younger than the age of 18

Conduct disorder (CD) is a mental disorder diagnosed in childhood or adolescence that is characterized by a repetitive and persistent pattern of antisocial behavior involving the violation of the basic rights of others or major age-appropriate norms. These behaviors may include theft, lying, physical violence, destruction, and rule-breaking. Conduct disorder is often seen as the precursor to antisocial personality disorder; however, the latter, by definition, cannot be diagnosed until the individual is 18 years old. Conduct disorder may result from parental rejection and neglect and in such cases can be treated with family therapy, as well as behavioral modifications and pharmacotherapy. It may also be caused by environmental lead exposure. Conduct disorder is estimated to affect 51.1 million people globally as of 2013.

== Signs and symptoms ==
One of the symptoms of conduct disorder is a lower level of fear. Research performed on the impact of toddlers exposed to fear and distress shows that negative emotionality (fear) predicts toddlers' empathy-related response to distress. The findings support that if a caregiver is able to respond to infant cues, the toddler has a better ability to respond to fear and distress. If a child does not learn how to handle fear or distress the child will be more likely to lash out at other children. If the caregiver is able to provide therapeutic intervention teaching children at risk better empathy skills, the child will have a lower incident level of conduct disorder.

The condition is also linked to a rise in violent and antisocial behaviour; examples may range from pushing, hitting and biting when the child is young, progressing towards beating and inflicted cruelty as the child becomes older. Additionally, self-harm has been observed in children with conduct disorder (CD). A predisposition towards impulsivity and lowered emotional intelligence have been cited as contributing factors to this phenomenon. However, in order to determine direct causal links further studies must be conducted.

Conduct disorder can present with limited prosocial emotions, lack of remorse or guilt, lack of empathy, lack of concern for performance, and shallow or deficient affect. Symptoms vary by individual, but the four main groups of symptoms according to the DSM-V are described below.

=== Aggression to people and animals ===
- Often bullies, threatens or intimidates others
- Often initiates physical fights
- Has used a weapon that can cause serious physical harm to others (e.g., a bat, brick, broken bottle, knife, gun)
- Has been physically cruel to people
- Has been physically cruel to animals
- Has stolen while confronting a victim (e.g., mugging, purse snatching, extortion, armed robbery)
- Feels no remorse or empathy towards the harm, fear, or pain they may have inflicted on others

=== Destruction of property ===
- Has deliberately engaged in fire setting with the intention of causing serious damage
- Has deliberately destroyed others' property (other than by fire setting)

=== Deceitfulness or theft ===
- Has broken into someone else's house, other building, car, other vehicle, etc
- Often lies to obtain goods or favors or to avoid obligations (i.e., "cons" others)
- Has stolen items of nontrivial value without confronting a victim (e.g., shoplifting, but without breaking and entering; forgery)

=== Serious violations of rules ===
- Often stays out at night despite parental prohibitions, beginning before age 13
- Has run away from home overnight at least twice while living in parental or parental surrogate home (or once without returning for a lengthy period)
- Is often truant from school, beginning before age 13

The lack of empathy these individuals have and the aggression that accompanies this carelessness for the consequences is dangerous, not only for the individual but for those around them.

=== Developmental course ===
Currently, two possible developmental courses are thought to lead to conduct disorder. The first is known as the "childhood-onset type" and occurs when conduct disorder symptoms are present before the age of 10 years. This course is often linked to a more persistent life course and more pervasive behaviors. Specifically, children in this group have greater levels of ADHD symptoms, neuropsychological deficits, more academic problems, increased family dysfunction and higher likelihood of aggression and violence.

There is debate among professionals regarding the validity and appropriateness of diagnosing young children with conduct disorder. The characteristics of the diagnosis are commonly seen in young children who are referred to mental health professionals. A premature diagnosis made in young children, and thus labeling and stigmatizing an individual, may be inappropriate. It is also argued that some children may not in fact have conduct disorder, but are engaging in developmentally appropriate disruptive behavior.

The second developmental course is known as the "adolescent-onset type" and occurs when conduct disorder symptoms are present after the age of 10 years. Individuals with adolescent-onset conduct disorder exhibit less impairment than those with the childhood-onset type and are not characterized by similar psychopathology. At times, these individuals will remit in their deviant patterns before adulthood. Research has shown that there is a greater number of children with adolescent-onset conduct disorder than those with childhood-onset, suggesting that adolescent-onset conduct disorder is an exaggeration of developmental behaviors that are typically seen in adolescence, such as rebellion against authority figures and rejection of conventional values. However, this argument is not established and empirical research suggests that these subgroups are not as valid as once thought.

In addition to these two courses that are recognized by the DSM-IV-TR, there appears to be a relationship among oppositional defiant disorder, conduct disorder, and antisocial personality disorder. Specifically, research has demonstrated continuity in the disorders such that conduct disorder is often diagnosed in children who have been previously diagnosed with oppositional defiant disorder, and most adults with antisocial personality disorder were previously diagnosed with conduct disorder. For example, some research has shown that 90% of children diagnosed with conduct disorder had a previous diagnosis of oppositional defiant disorder. Moreover, both disorders share relevant risk factors and disruptive behaviors, suggesting that oppositional defiant disorder is a developmental precursor and milder variant of conduct disorder. However, this is not to say that this trajectory occurs in all individuals. In fact, only about 25% of children with oppositional defiant disorder will receive a later diagnosis of conduct disorder. Correspondingly, there is an established link between conduct disorder and the diagnosis of antisocial personality disorder as an adult. In fact, the current diagnostic criteria for antisocial personality disorder require a conduct disorder diagnosis before the age of 15. However, again, only 25–40% of youths with conduct disorder will develop an antisocial personality disorder. Nonetheless, many of the individuals who do not meet full criteria for antisocial personality disorder still exhibit a pattern of social and personal impairments or antisocial behaviors. These developmental trajectories suggest the existence of antisocial pathways in certain individuals, which have important implications for both research and treatment.

=== Associated conditions ===
Children with conduct disorder have a high risk of developing other adjustment problems. Specifically, risk factors associated with conduct disorder and the effects of conduct disorder symptomatology on a child's psychosocial context have been linked to overlapping with other psychological disorders. In this way, there seems to be reciprocal effects of comorbidity with certain disorders, leading to increased overall risk for these youth.

==== Attention deficit hyperactivity disorder ====
ADHD is the condition most commonly associated with conduct disorders, with approximately 25–30% of boys and 50–55% of girls with conduct disorder having a comorbid ADHD diagnosis. While it is unlikely that ADHD alone is a risk factor for developing conduct disorder, children who exhibit hyperactivity and impulsivity along with aggression is associated with the early onset of conduct problems. Moreover, children with comorbid conduct disorder and ADHD show more severe aggression.

Oppositional defiant disorder

ODD is a mental disorder characterized by angry, argumentative, and resentful behavior. ODD and CD both fall under the umbrella of Disruptive Behavior Disorders (DBD). The main difference is in severity. While ODD is based on verbal hostility, CD is more severe in that it includes aggression and violence towards other people and animals, theft, deceit, and breaking of rules. ODD has also been found to be a precursor for CD. The chances of developing CD is four times higher in children who previously had ODD than in children who do not have a history of ODD.

==== Substance use disorders ====
Conduct disorder is also highly associated with both substance use and abuse. Children with conduct disorder have an earlier onset of substance use, as compared to their peers, and also tend to use multiple substances. Studies have shown that a diagnosis of conduct disorder during early adolescence (11–14 years old) was a significant predictor of substance abuse by the age of 18. However, substance use disorders themselves can directly or indirectly cause conduct disorder-like traits in about half of adolescents who have a substance use disorder. As mentioned above, it seems that there is a transactional relationship between substance use and conduct problems, such that aggressive behaviors increase substance use, which leads to increased aggressive behavior. Notably, while older studies may have failed to find a correlation between hyperactivity or impulsivity as a predictor of conduct disorder, more recent studies have found that even a single symptom of ADHD or conduct disorder is associated with increased risk of substance abuse.

Substance use in conduct disorder can lead to antisocial behavior in adulthood.

==== Schizophrenia ====
Conduct disorder is a precursor to schizophrenia in a minority of cases, with about 40% of men and 31% of women with schizophrenia meeting criteria for childhood conduct disorder.

== Cause ==
While the cause of conduct disorder is complicated by an intricate interplay of biological and environmental factors, identifying underlying mechanisms is crucial for obtaining accurate assessment and implementing effective treatment. These mechanisms serve as the fundamental building blocks on which evidence-based treatments are developed. Despite the complexities, several domains have been implicated in the development of conduct disorder including cognitive variables, neurological factors, intraindividual factors, familial and peer influences, and wider contextual factors. These factors may also vary based on the age of onset, with different variables related to early (e.g., neurodevelopmental basis) and adolescent (e.g., social/peer relationships) onset.

=== Risks ===
The development of conduct disorder is not immutable or predetermined. A number of interactive risk and protective factors exist that can influence and change outcomes, and in most cases conduct disorder develops due to an interaction and gradual accumulation of risk factors. In addition to the risk factors identified under cause, several other variables place youth at increased risk for developing the disorder, including child physical abuse, in-utero alcohol exposure, and maternal smoking during pregnancy. Protective factors have also been identified, and most notably include high IQ, being female, positive social orientations, good coping skills, and supportive family and community relationships.

However, a correlation between a particular risk factor and a later developmental outcome (such as conduct disorder) cannot be taken as definitive evidence for a causal link. Co-variation between two variables can arise, for instance, if they represent age-specific expressions of similar underlying genetic factors. There have been studies that found that, although smoking during pregnancy does contribute to increased levels of antisocial behaviour, in mother-fetus pairs that were not genetically related (by virtue of in-vitro fertilisation), no link between smoking during pregnancy and later conduct problems was found. Thus, the distinction between causality and correlation is an important consideration.

=== Learning disabilities ===
While language impairments are most common, approximately 20–25% of youth with conduct disorder have some type of learning disability. Although the relationship between the disorders is complex, it seems as if learning disabilities result from a combination of ADHD, a history of academic difficulty and failure, and long-standing socialization difficulties with family and peers. However, confounding variables, such as language deficits, SES disadvantage, or neurodevelopmental delay also need to be considered in this relationship, as they could help explain some of the association between conduct disorder and learning problems.

=== Cognitive factors ===
In terms of cognitive function, intelligence and cognitive deficits are common amongst youths with conduct disorder, particularly those with early-onset and have intelligence quotients (IQ) one standard deviation below the mean and severe deficits in verbal reasoning and executive function. Executive function difficulties may manifest in terms of one's ability to shift between tasks, plan as well as organize, and also inhibit a prepotent response. These findings hold true even after taking into account other variables such as socioeconomic status (SES), and education. However, IQ and executive function deficits are only one piece of the puzzle, and the magnitude of their influence is increased during transactional processes with environmental factors.

=== Brain differences ===
Beyond difficulties in executive function, neurological research on youth with conduct disorder also demonstrate differences in brain anatomy and function that reflect the behaviors and mental anomalies associated in conduct disorder. Compared to normal controls, youths with early and adolescent onset of conduct disorder displayed reduced responses in brain regions associated with social behavior (i.e., amygdala, ventromedial prefrontal cortex, insula, and orbitofrontal cortex). In addition, youths with conduct disorder also demonstrated less responsiveness in the orbitofrontal regions of the brain during a stimulus-reinforcement and reward task. This provides a neural explanation for why youths with conduct disorder may be more likely to repeat poor decision making patterns. Lastly, youths with conduct disorder display a reduction in grey matter volume in the amygdala, which may account for the fear conditioning deficits. This reduction has been linked to difficulty processing social emotional stimuli, regardless of the age of onset. Aside from the differences in neuroanatomy and activation patterns between youth with conduct disorder and controls, neurochemical profiles also vary between groups. Individuals with conduct disorder are characterized as having reduced serotonin and cortisol levels (e.g., reduced hypothalamic-pituitary-adrenal (HPA) axis), as well as reduced autonomic nervous system (ANS) functioning. These reductions are associated with the inability to regulate mood and impulsive behaviors, weakened signals of anxiety and fear, and decreased self-esteem. Taken together, these findings may account for some of the variance in the psychological and behavioral patterns of youth with conduct disorder.

=== Intra-individual factors ===
Aside from findings related to neurological and neurochemical profiles of youth with conduct disorder, intraindividual factors such as genetics may also be relevant. Having a sibling or parent with conduct disorder increases the likelihood of having the disorder, with a heritability rate of .53. There also tends to be a stronger genetic link for individuals with childhood-onset compared to adolescent onset. In addition, youth with conduct disorder also exhibit polymorphism in the monoamine oxidase A gene, low resting heart rates, and increased testosterone.

=== Family and peer influences ===
Elements of the family and social environment may also play a role in the development and maintenance of conduct disorder. For instance, antisocial behavior suggestive of conduct disorder is associated with single parent status, parental divorce, large family size, and the young age of mothers. However, these factors are difficult to tease apart from other demographic variables that are known to be linked with conduct disorder, including poverty and low socioeconomic status. Family functioning and parent–child interactions also play a substantial role in childhood aggression and conduct disorder, with low levels of parental involvement, inadequate supervision, and unpredictable discipline practices reinforcing youth's defiant behaviors. Moreover, maternal depression has a significant impact on conduct disordered children and can lead to negative reciprocal feedback between the mother and conduct disordered child. Peer influences have also been related to the development of antisocial behavior in youth, particularly peer rejection in childhood and association with deviant peers. Peer rejection is not only a marker of a number of externalizing disorders, but also a contributing factor for the continuity of the disorders over time. Hinshaw and Lee (2003) also explain that association with deviant peers has been thought to influence the development of conduct disorder in two ways: 1) a "selection" process whereby youth with aggressive characteristics choose deviant friends, and 2) a "facilitation" process whereby deviant peer networks bolster patterns of antisocial behavior. In a separate study by Bonin and colleagues, parenting programs were shown to positively affect child behavior and reduce costs to the public sector.

=== Wider contextual factors ===
In addition to the individual and social factors associated with conduct disorder, research has highlighted the importance of environment and context in youth with antisocial behavior. However, these are not static factors, but rather transactional in nature (e.g., individuals are influenced by and also influence their environment). For instance, neighborhood safety and exposure to violence have been studied in conjunction with conduct disorder, but it is not simply the case that youth with aggressive tendencies reside in violent neighborhoods. Transactional models propose that youth may resort to violence more often as a result of exposure to community violence, but their predisposition towards violence also contributes to neighborhood climate.

== Diagnosis ==
Conduct disorder is classified in the fourth edition of Diagnostic and Statistical Manual of Mental Disorders (DSM). It is diagnosed based on a prolonged pattern of antisocial behaviour such as serious violation of laws and social norms and rules in people younger than the age of 18. Similar criteria are used in those over the age of 18 for the diagnosis of antisocial personality disorder. No proposed revisions for the main criteria of conduct disorder exist in the DSM-5; there is a recommendation by the work group to add an additional specifier for callous and unemotional traits. According to DSM-5 criteria for conduct disorder, there are four categories that could be present in the child's behavior: aggression to people and animals, destruction of property, deceitfulness or theft, and serious violation of rules.

Almost all adolescents who have a substance use disorder have conduct disorder-like traits, but after successful treatment of the substance use disorder, about half of these adolescents no longer display conduct disorder-like symptoms. Therefore, it is important to exclude a substance-induced cause and instead address the substance use disorder prior to making a psychiatric diagnosis of conduct disorder.

== Treatment ==
First-line treatment is psychotherapy based on behavior modification and problem-solving skills. This treatment seeks to integrate individual, school, and family settings. Parent-management training can also be helpful. No medications have been FDA approved for conduct disorder, but the atypical antipsychotic risperidone has the most evidence to support its use for aggression in children who have not responded to behavioral and psychosocial interventions. Selective serotonin reuptake inhibitors (SSRIs) are also sometimes used to treat irritability in these patients.

A 2025 systematic review found that psychosocial interventions, particularly those involving both parent and child (multicomponent) or parent-only approaches, were more effective than standard care or no intervention in reducing disruptive behaviors among children with conduct problems. In cases where behavioral therapy was insufficient, stimulant medications or risperidone showed modest benefits; however, medication use was associated with an increased risk of adverse events. A 2026 meta-analysis found that younger children benefit more from these treatments than teenagers. Programs combining parent and child work showed larger effects in preschool children than in older kids. The study found limited evidence that these treatments help adolescents with conduct problems.

== Prognosis ==
About 25–40% of youths diagnosed with conduct disorder qualify for a diagnosis of antisocial personality disorder when they reach adulthood. For those that do not develop ASPD, most still exhibit social dysfunction in adult life.

== Epidemiology ==
Conduct disorder is estimated to affect 51.1 million people globally as of 2013. The percentage of children affected by conduct disorder is estimated to range from 1–10%. However, among incarcerated youth or youth in juvenile detention facilities, rates of conduct disorder are between 23% and 87%.

=== Sex differences ===
The majority of research on conduct disorder suggests that there are a significantly greater number of males than females with the diagnosis, with some reports demonstrating a threefold to fourfold difference in prevalence. However, this difference may be somewhat biased by the diagnostic criteria which focus on more overt behaviors, such as aggression and fighting, which are more often exhibited by males. Females are more likely to be characterized by covert behaviors, such as stealing or running away. Moreover, conduct disorder in females is linked to several negative outcomes, such as antisocial personality disorder and early pregnancy, suggesting that sex differences in disruptive behaviors need to be more fully understood.

Females are more responsive to peer pressure including feelings of guilt than males.

=== Racial differences ===
Research on racial or cultural differences on the prevalence or presentation of conduct disorder is limited. However, according to studies on American youth, it appears that black youths are more often diagnosed with conduct disorder, while Asian youths are about one-third as likely to be diagnosed with conduct disorder when compared to white youths. It has been widely theorized for decades that this disparity is due to unconscious bias in those who give the diagnosis, although an alternative explanation is the culture and values of the communities the individuals arise from.

== Anthropological approach to conduct disorder ==
=== Societal approach ===
Early societal perspectives on conduct disorder emerged in the mid-20th century, when researchers began linking disruptive behaviours to socioeconomic disadvantage, family instability, and community disorganisation. This shifted understanding away from solely individual pathology toward broader structural and environmental explanations.

A societal approach to conduct disorder (CD) emphasises the role of broader social systems, such as families, schools, neighbourhoods, and communities, in both the development and prevention of antisocial behaviours. Sociocultural contexts including poverty, social inequality, unstable neighbourhoods, and school environments rich in peer aggression are recognised as key risk factors for CD. In response, interventions have evolved from purely clinical models to systemic, community-integrated strategies. Programs like FAST Track, which combine family-based training, school curricula, mentoring, and home visits, have demonstrated effectiveness in reducing conduct problems and supporting social competence across multiple domains. Similarly, multi-systemic therapy (MST) targets the youth's interconnected systems, including individual, familial, peer, school, and neighbourhood factors, to promote behavioural change through intensive, personalised support. This societal approach underscores that addressing CD effectively requires coordinated, multi-sectoral efforts that acknowledge and transform the social environments influencing youth behaviour.

=== Mis/Pre diagnosing children with conduct disorders in a biomedical and biosocial sense ===
Mis-diagnoses and pre-diagnoses can occur due to the poor modelling surrounding Conduct Disorders. As noted by Frick, typical diagnoses, which rely heavily on 'patterns of covariation', can result in stigmatisation within Western societies. An example of an unreliable model for which someone may be diagnosed with Conduct Disorder, such as psychopathy, is antisocial behaviour. Frick claims this is not universally agreed upon as necessary for individuals with psychopathy to portray.

In attempts to make the diagnostic criteria more accurate and less harmful post-diagnosis, the DSM and ICD-11 added further symptoms that children and adults must meet to be diagnosed with Conduct Disorder, such as Oppositional Defiant Disorder.

Addressing the potential stigma that can occur to children once diagnosed with conduct disorders may be aided by diagnostic speech, referring to "callous-unemotional behaviours" instead of "callous-unemotional traits". Following this, the DSM refers to the 'specifier for Conduct Disorder' as "with Limited Prosocial Emotions", allowing for a more accurate label of a typical trait.

Emmott and Gibbon follow this means of improvement by again highlighting the impact of the diagnostic language, causing children generally to be viewed as developing positively or negatively, depending on whether they are becoming 'more advanced' or falling behind, respectively. Phelps and McClintocks biosocial approach gives understanding to traits found in children or adolescents, such as antisocial behaviour, which may be impacted by 'genetic transmission', or modelled 'deviant behaviour' by parental figures.

Combining these biomedical and biosocial approaches allows professionals to gain a greater understanding into the harms of diagnosing children with Conduct Disorders, and gives a foundation on how to further improve the diagnostic system.

=== Delinquency ===
Prior to conduct disorder as a diagnosis under the DSM, similar behaviour exhibited in children was often referred under the term delinquency.

Delinquency was ascribed to behaviour - often by children or adolescence deemed illegal/not acceptable and marked as a societal burden. Delinquency, however, despite its use as a prescriber of behaviour, is associated by factors of influence which increase the likelihood of exhibiting or acting it out.

Whether directly drawn from developmental such as child abuse or trauma, poor parental supervision, erratic or neglectful emotional contact, low-socio economic backgrounds; to further environmental factors such as high crime neighbourhoods, antisocial peer groups or lack of effective role models.

The causes and effects of antisocial behaviours, can be considerably different depending on age (e.g a preschooler versus a teenager), and function differently between genders.

The relationship between the individual, society and the cultural realm they inhabit have all shown to play a role in ascribing a person and/or their behaviour as delinquency.

Many such behaviours intersect with the criminal justice system, and despite being broadly deemed antisocial, not all exhibited behaviour in children and adolescence meet the diagnostic criteria for conduct disorder. More specifically, in assessment for conduct disorder, as for many personality disorders in adults, the focus of approach is not merely on the actions of a person but unemotional traits such as lack of empathy, extreme aggression, and lack of remorse.
