= Oppositional defiant disorder =

Mental disorder involving hostility and defiance

- Specialty: Pediatrics, psychiatry
- Symptoms: Recurrent patterns of negative, hostile, or defiant behavior towards authority figures
- Complications: Enforcement action
- Usual onset: Childhood or adolescence (can become evident before 8 years of age)
- Duration: Is diagnosed until 18 years of age
- Causes: Insufficient care for the affected child during early development
- Risk factors: ADHD
- Differential diagnosis: Conduct disorder, disruptive mood dysregulation disorder, attention deficit hyperactivity disorder, bipolar disorder, autism spectrum disorder, psychosis, borderline personality disorder, major depressive disorder, antisocial personality disorder
- Treatment: Medication, cognitive behavioral therapy, family therapy, intervention
- Medication: CNS stimulants (methylphenidate, amphetamine); Non-Stimulants (Atomoxetine, Viloxazine); alpha-2a agonists (guanfacine XR, clonidine XR)
- Prognosis: Poor unless professionally treated
- Frequency: ≈3%

Oppositional defiant disorder (ODD) is listed in the DSM-5 under Disruptive, impulse-control, and conduct disorders and defined as "a pattern of angry/irritable mood, argumentative/defiant behavior, or vindictiveness". This behavior is usually targeted toward peers, parents, teachers, and other authority figures, including law enforcement officials. Unlike conduct disorder (CD), those with ODD do not generally show patterns of aggression towards random people, violence against animals, destruction of property, theft, or deceit. One-half of children with ODD also fulfill the diagnostic criteria for ADHD.

Oppositional defiant disorder's validity as a diagnosis has been criticized since its inclusion in the DSM-III in 1980. Research has shown that African Americans and Latino Americans are more likely to be diagnosed with ODD, while white counterparts with the same symptoms are more likely to be diagnosed with ADHD. It has been compared to drapetomania, a pseudoscientific diagnosis which characterized slaves in the Antebellum South who repeatedly tried to escape as being mentally ill.

== Signs and symptoms ==
Defiant behaviors are mostly directed towards an authority figure such as a teacher or a parent. Although these behaviors can be typical among siblings, they must be observed with individuals other than siblings for an ODD diagnosis. Children with ODD can be verbally aggressive. However, they do not display physical aggressiveness, a behavior observed in conduct disorder. Furthermore, the behaviors must be perpetuated for longer than six months and must be considered beyond a normal child's age, gender and culture to fit the diagnosis. For children under five years of age, they must occur on most days over a period of six months. For children over five years of age, they must occur at least once a week for at least six months. If symptoms are confined to only one setting, most commonly home, it is considered mild in severity. If it is observed in two settings, it is characterized as moderate, and if the symptoms are observed in three or more settings, it is considered severe.

These patterns of behavior result in impairment at school or other social venues.

=== Etiology ===
There is no specific element that has yet been identified as directly causing ODD. Research looking precisely at the etiological factors linked with ODD is limited. The literature often examines common risk factors linked with all disruptive behaviors, rather than ODD specifically. Symptoms of ODD are also often believed to be the same as CD, even though the disorders have their own respective set of symptoms. When looking at disruptive behaviors such as ODD, research has shown that the causes of behaviors are multi-factorial. However, disruptive behaviors have been identified as being mostly due either to biological or environmental factors.

=== Genetic influences ===
Research indicates that parents pass on a tendency for externalizing disorders to their children that may be displayed in multiple ways, such as inattention, hyperactivity, or oppositional and conduct problems. Research has also shown that there is a genetic overlap between ODD and other externalizing disorders. Heritability can vary by age, age of onset, and other factors. Adoption and twin studies indicate that 50% or more of the variance causing antisocial behavior is attributable to heredity for both males and females. ODD also tends to occur in families with a history of ADHD, substance use disorders, or mood disorders, suggesting that a vulnerability to develop ODD may be inherited. A difficult temperament, impulsivity, and a tendency to seek rewards can also increase the risk of developing ODD. New studies into gene variants have also identified possible gene-environment (G x E) interactions, specifically in the development of conduct problems. A variant of the gene that encodes the neurotransmitter metabolizing enzyme monoamine oxidase-A (MAOA), which relates to neural systems involved in aggression, plays a key role in regulating behavior following threatening events. Brain imaging studies show patterns of arousal in areas of the brain that are associated with aggression in response to emotion-provoking stimuli.

=== Prenatal factors and birth complications ===
Many pregnancy and birth problems are related to the development of conduct problems. Malnutrition, specifically protein deficiency, lead poisoning or exposure to lead, and mother's use of alcohol or other substances during pregnancy may increase the risk of developing ODD. In numerous research, substance use prior to birth has also been associated with developing disruptive behaviors such as ODD. Although pregnancy and birth factors are correlated with ODD, strong evidence of direct biological causation is lacking.

=== Neurobiological factors ===
Deficits and injuries to certain areas of the brain can lead to serious behavioral problems in children. Brain imaging studies have suggested that children with ODD may have hypofunction in the part of the brain responsible for reasoning, judgment, and impulse control. Children with ODD are thought to have an overactive behavioral activation system (BAS), and an underactive behavioral inhibition system (BIS). The BAS stimulates behavior in response to signals of reward or non-punishment. The BIS produces anxiety and inhibits ongoing behavior in the presence of novel events, innate fear stimuli, and signals of non-reward or punishment. Neuroimaging studies have also identified structural and functional brain abnormalities in several brain regions in youths with conduct disorders. These brain regions are the amygdala, prefrontal cortex, anterior cingulate, and insula, as well as interconnected regions.

=== Social-cognitive factors ===
As many as 40 percent of boys and 25 percent of girls with persistent conduct problems display significant social-cognitive impairments. Some of these deficits include immature forms of thinking (such as egocentrism), failure to use verbal mediators to regulate their behavior, and cognitive distortions, such as interpreting a neutral event as an intentional hostile act. Children with ODD have difficulty controlling their emotions or behaviors. In fact, students with ODD have limited social knowledge that is based only on individual experiences, which shapes how they process information and solve problems cognitively. This information can be linked with the social information processing model (SIP) that describes how children process information to respond appropriately or inappropriately in social settings. This model explains that children will go through five stages before displaying behaviors: encoding, mental representations, response accessing, evaluation, and enactment. However, children with ODD have cognitive distortions and impaired cognitive processes. This will therefore directly impact their interactions and relationship negatively. It has been shown that social and cognitive impairments result in negative peer relationships, loss of friendship, and an interruption in socially engaging in activities. Children learn through observational learning and social learning. Therefore, observations of models have a direct impact and greatly influence children's behaviors and decision-making processes. Children often learn through modeling behavior. Modeling can act as a powerful tool to modify children's cognition and behaviors.

=== Environmental factors ===
Negative parenting practices and parent–child conflict may lead to antisocial behavior, but they may also be a reaction to the oppositional and aggressive behaviors of children. Factors such as a family history of mental illnesses or substance use disorders as well as a dysfunctional family and inconsistent discipline by a parent or guardian can lead to the development of behavior disorders. Parenting practices not providing adequate or appropriate adjustment to situations as well as a high ratio of conflicting events within a family are causal factors of risk for developing ODD.

Insecure parent–child attachments can also contribute to ODD. Often little internalization of parent and societal standards exists in children with conduct problems. These weak bonds with their parents may lead children to associate with delinquency and substance use. Family instability and stress can also contribute to the development of ODD. Although the association between family factors and conduct problems is well established, the nature of this association and the possible causal role of family factors continues to be debated.

School is also a significant environmental context besides family that strongly influences a child's maladaptive behaviors. Studies indicate that child and adolescent externalizing disorders like ODD are strongly linked to peer network and teacher response. Children with ODD present hostile and defiant behavior toward authority, including teachers, which makes teachers less tolerant toward deviant children. The way in which a teacher handles disruptive behavior has a significant influence on the behavior of children with ODD. Negative relationships from the socializing influences and support network of teachers and peers increases the risk of deviant behavior. This is because the child consequently gets affiliated with deviant peers that reinforce antisocial behavior and delinquency. Due to the significant influence of teachers in managing disruptive behaviors, teacher training is a recommended intervention to change the disruptive behavior of ODD children.

In a number of studies, low socioeconomic status has also been associated with disruptive behaviors such as ODD.

Other social factors such as neglect, abuse, parents that are not involved, and lack of supervision can also contribute to ODD.

Externalizing problems are reported to be more frequent among minority-status youth, a finding that is likely related to economic hardship, limited employment opportunities, and living in high-risk urban neighborhoods. Studies have also found that the state of being exposed to violence was a contribution factor for externalizing behaviors to occur.

== Diagnosis ==
For a child or adolescent to qualify for a diagnosis of ODD, behaviors must cause considerable distress for the family or interfere significantly with academic or social functioning. Such interference might manifest as challenges in learning at school, making friends, or placing the individual in harmful situations. These behaviors must also persist for at least six months. It is crucial to consider the bio-socio complexity in the expression and management of ODD. Biological factors such as genetics and neurodevelopmental variations interact with social factors like family dynamics, educational practices, and societal norms to influence the manifestation and recognition of ODD symptoms. The effects of ODD can be amplified by other disorders in comorbidity such as ADHD, depression, and substance use disorders. This intricate interplay between biological predispositions and social factors can lead to diverse clinical presentations, affecting the approaches to treatment and support.

=== Comorbidity ===
Oppositional defiant disorder can be described as a term or disorder with a variety of pathways in regard to comorbidity. High importance must be given to the representation of ODD as a distinct psychiatric disorder independent of conduct disorder.

In the context of oppositional defiant disorder and comorbidity with other disorders, researchers often conclude that ODD co-occurs with attention deficit hyperactivity disorder (ADHD), anxiety disorders, emotional disorders as well as mood disorders. Those mood disorders can be linked to major depression or bipolar disorder. Indirect consequences of ODD can also be related or associated with a later mental disorder. For instance, conduct disorder is often studied in connection with ODD. Strong comorbidity can be observed within those two disorders, but an even higher connection with ADHD in relation to ODD can be seen. For instance, children or adolescents who have ODD with coexisting ADHD will usually be more aggressive and have more of the negative behavioral symptoms of ODD, which can inhibit them from having a successful academic life. This will be reflected in their academic path as students.

Other conditions that can be predicted in children or people with ODD are learning disorders in which the person has significant impairments with academics and language disorders, in which problems can be observed related to language production or comprehension.

== Management ==
Approaches to the treatment of ODD include parent management training, individual psychotherapy, family therapy, cognitive behavioral therapy, and social skills training. According to the American Academy of Child and Adolescent Psychiatry, treatments for ODD are tailored specifically to the individual child, and different treatment techniques are applied for pre-schoolers and adolescents.

Children with oppositional defiant disorder tend to exhibit problematic behavior that can be very difficult to control. An occupational therapist can recommend family-based education, referred to as parent management training, in order to encourage positive parent and child relationships and reduce the child's tantrums and other disruptive behaviors. Since ODD is a neurological disorder that has biological correlates, an occupational therapist can also provide problem solving training to encourage positive coping skills when difficult situations arise, as well as offer cognitive behavioral therapy.

According to a 2025 systematic review commissioned by AHRQ and PCORI, parent-based and multicomponent psychosocial interventions significantly reduced oppositional and defiant behaviors in preschool and school-age children compared to usual care or no treatment. Evidence for child-only therapies was limited, particularly in younger children, and pharmacologic options were associated with more adverse effects and less consistent benefits. A 2026 meta-analysis found that these treatments work better for younger kids. For preschoolers, parent-only programs showed medium-sized improvements, while programs that work with both parents and children showed large improvements. For elementary school-aged children, the improvements were smaller but still helpful right after treatment, though the long-term results were mixed.

=== Psychopharmacological treatment ===
Psychopharmacological treatment is the use of prescribed medication in managing oppositional defiant disorder. Prescribed medications to control ODD include mood stabilizers, antipsychotics, and stimulants. In two controlled randomized trials, it was found that between administered lithium and the placebo group, administering lithium decreased aggression in children with conduct disorder in a safe manner. However, a third study found the treatment of lithium over a period of two weeks invalid. Other drugs seen in studies include haloperidol, thioridazine, and methylphenidate which also is effective in treating ADHD, as it is a common comorbidity.

The effectiveness of drug and medication treatment is not well established. Effects that can result from taking these medications include hypotension, extrapyramidal symptoms, tardive dyskinesia, obesity, and increase in weight. Psychopharmacological treatment is found to be most effective when paired with another treatment plan, such as individual intervention or multimodal intervention.

=== Individual interventions ===
Individual interventions are focused on child-specific individualized plans. These interventions include anger control/stress inoculation, assertiveness training, a child-focused problem-solving skills training program, and self-monitoring skills.

Anger control and stress inoculation help prepare the child for possible upsetting situations or events that may cause anger and stress. They include a process of steps the child may go through.

Assertiveness training educates individuals in keeping a balance between passivity and aggression. It aims to help the child respond in a controlled and fair manner.

A child-focused problem-solving skills training program aims to teach the child new skills and cognitive processes that teach how to deal with negative thoughts, feelings, and actions.

=== Parent and family treatment ===
According to randomized trials, evidence shows that parent management training is most effective. It has strong influences over a long period of time and in various environments.

Parent-child interaction training is intended to coach the parents while involving the child. This training has two phases; the first phase is child-directed interaction, where the focus is to teach the child non-directive play skills. The second phase is parent-directed interaction, where the parents are coached on aspects including clear instruction, praise for compliance, and time-out for noncompliance. The parent-child interaction training is best suited for elementary-aged children.

Parent and family treatment has a low financial cost, which can yield an increase in beneficial results.

=== Multimodal intervention ===
Multimodal intervention is an effective treatment that looks at different levels including family, peers, school, and neighborhood. It is an intervention that concentrates on multiple risk factors. The focus is on parent training, classroom social skills, and playground behavior programs. The intervention is intensive and addresses barriers to individuals' improvement such as parental substance use or parental marital conflict.

An impediment to treatment includes the nature of the disorder itself, whereby treatment is often not complied with and is not continued or adhered to for adequate periods of time.

== Epidemiology ==
ODD is a pattern of negative, defiant, disobedient, and hostile behavior, and it is one of the most prevalent disorders from preschool age to adulthood. This can include frequent temper tantrums, excessive arguing with adults, refusing to follow rules, purposefully upsetting others, getting easily irked, having an angry attitude, and vindictive acts. Children with ODD usually begin showing symptoms around age six to eight, although the disorder can emerge in younger children too. Symptoms can last throughout teenage years. The pooled prevalence is 3.6% up to age 18.

Oppositional defiant disorder has a prevalence of 1–11%. The average prevalence is approximately 3%. Gender and age play an important role in the rate of the disorder. ODD gradually develops and becomes apparent in preschool years, often before the age of eight years old. However, it is very unlikely to emerge following early adolescence.

There is a difference in prevalence between boys and girls, with a ratio of 1.4 to 1 before adolescence. Other research suggests a 2:1 ratio. Prevalence in girls tends to increase after puberty. Researchers have found that the general prevalence of ODD throughout cultures remains constant. However, the gendered disparities in diagnoses is only seen in Western cultures. It is unknown whether this reflects underlying differences in incidence or under-diagnosis of girls. Physical abuse at home is a significant predictor of diagnosis for girls only, and emotional responsiveness of parents is a significant predictor of diagnosis for boys only, which may have implications for how gendered socialization and received gender roles affect ODD symptoms and outcomes.

Children from lower-income backgrounds are more likely to be diagnosed with ODD. The correlative link between low income and ODD diagnosis is direct in boys, but in girls, the link is more complex; the diagnosis is associated with specific parental techniques such as corporal punishment, which are in turn linked to lower income households. This disparity may be linked to a more general tendency of boys and men to display more externalized psychiatric symptoms, and girls to display more internalized ones (such as self-harm or anorexia nervosa).

In the United States, African Americans and Latinos are more likely to receive diagnoses of ODD or other conduct disorders compared to non-Hispanic White youth with the same symptoms, who are more likely to be diagnosed with ADHD. This has wide-ranging implications about the role of racial bias in how certain behaviors are perceived and categorized as either defiant or inattentive/hyperactive.

Prevalence of ODD and conduct disorder are significantly higher among children in foster care. One survey in Norway found that 14 percent met the criteria, and other studies have found a prevalence of up to 17 or even 29 percent. Low parental attachment and parenting style are strong predictors of ODD symptoms.

Earlier conceptions of ODD had higher rates of diagnosis. When the disorder was first included in the DSM-III, the prevalence was 25% higher than when the DSM-IV revised the criteria of diagnosis. The DSM-5 made more changes to the criteria, grouping certain characteristics together in order to demonstrate that people with ODD display both emotional and behavioral symptoms. In addition, criteria were added to help guide clinicians in diagnosis because of the difficulty found in identifying whether the behaviors or other symptoms are directly related to the disorder or simply a phase in a child's life. Consequently, future studies may find that there was also a decline in prevalence between the DSM-IV and the DSM-5.

== History ==
Oppositional defiant disorder was first defined in the DSM-III (1980). Since the introduction of ODD as an independent disorder, the field trials to inform its definition have included predominantly male subjects. Some clinicians have debated whether the diagnostic criteria would be clinically relevant for use with women, and furthermore, some have questioned whether gender-specific criteria and thresholds should be included. Additionally, some clinicians have questioned the preclusion of ODD when conduct disorder is present. According to Dickstein, the DSM-5 attempts to:

redefine ODD by emphasizing a "persistent pattern of angry and irritable mood along with vindictive behavior," rather than DSM-IV's focus exclusively on "negativistic, hostile, and defiant behavior." Although DSM-IV implied, but did not mention, irritability, DSM-5 now includes three symptom clusters, one of which is "angry/irritable mood"—defined as "loses temper, is touchy/easily annoyed by others, and is angry/resentful." This suggests that the process of clinically relevant research driving nosology, and vice versa, has ensured that the future will bring greater understanding of ODD.

== Criticism ==
Oppositional defiant disorder's validity as a diagnosis has been criticized since its inclusion in the DSM-III in 1980. ODD was considered to produce minor impairment insufficient to qualify as a medical diagnosis, and was difficult to separate from conduct disorder, with some estimates that over 50% of those diagnosed with conduct disorder would also meet criteria for ODD. The diagnosis of ODD was also criticized for medicalizing normal developmental behavior. To address these problems, the DSM-III-R dropped the criterion of swearing and changed the cutoff from five of nine criteria, to four of eight. Most evidence indicated a dose–response relationship between the severity of symptoms and level of functional impairment, suggesting that the diagnostic threshold was arbitrary. Early field trials of ODD used subjects who were over 75% male.

Recent criticisms of ODD suggest that the use of ODD as a diagnosis exacerbates the stigma surrounding reactive behavior and frames normal reactions to trauma as personal issues of self-control. Anti-psychiatry scholars have extensively criticized this diagnosis through a Foucauldian framework, characterizing it as a tool of the psy apparatus which pathologizes resistance to injustice. Oppositional defiant disorder has been compared to drapetomania, a now-obsolete disorder proposed by Samuel A. Cartwright which characterized slaves in the Antebellum South who repeatedly tried to escape as being mentally ill.

=== Race and gender bias in the US ===
Research has shown that African Americans and Latino Americans are disproportionately likely to be diagnosed with ODD compared to White counterparts displaying the same symptoms, who are more likely to be diagnosed with ADHD. Assessment, diagnosis and treatment of ODD may not account for contextual problems experienced by the patient, and can be influenced by cultural and personal racial bias on the part of counselors and therapists. Many children diagnosed with ODD were, upon reassessment, found to better fit diagnoses of obsessive–compulsive disorder, bipolar disorder, attention deficit hyperactivity disorder, or anxiety disorder. Diagnoses of ODD or conduct disorder are not eligible for disability accommodation at school under the Individuals with Disabilities Education Act. When parents request accommodation for a diagnosed disorder which is eligible, such as ADHD, the request can be denied on the basis that such conditions are co-morbid with ODD. This bias in perception and diagnosis leads to defiant behaviors being medicalized and rehabilitated in White children, but criminalized for Latino and African American ones. Counselors working with children diagnosed with ODD reported that it was common for them to face stigma around the diagnosis in educational and justice systems, and that the diagnosis affected patients' self image. In one study over a quarter of children placed in the foster care system in the United States were found to have been diagnosed with ODD. Over half of children in the juvenile justice system have been diagnosed with ODD.

African American males are known to be more likely to be suspended or expelled from school, receive harsher sentences for the same offenses as defendants of different races, or be searched, assaulted or killed by police officers. The disproportionately high diagnosis of ODD in AA males may be used to rationalize these outcomes. In this manner, ODD diagnoses can serve as a mechanism of the school-to-prison pipeline. From this viewpoint, the ODD diagnosis frames expected reactions to injustice or trauma as defiant or criminal.

== See also ==
- Antisocial personality disorder
- Attachment disorder
- Attention deficit hyperactivity disorder (ADHD)
- Borderline personality disorder
- Conduct disorder
- Contrarianism
- Disruptive mood dysregulation disorder (DMDD)
- Oppositional culture
- Pathological demand avoidance
