= Lauretta Bender =

American neuropsychiatrist (1897–1987)

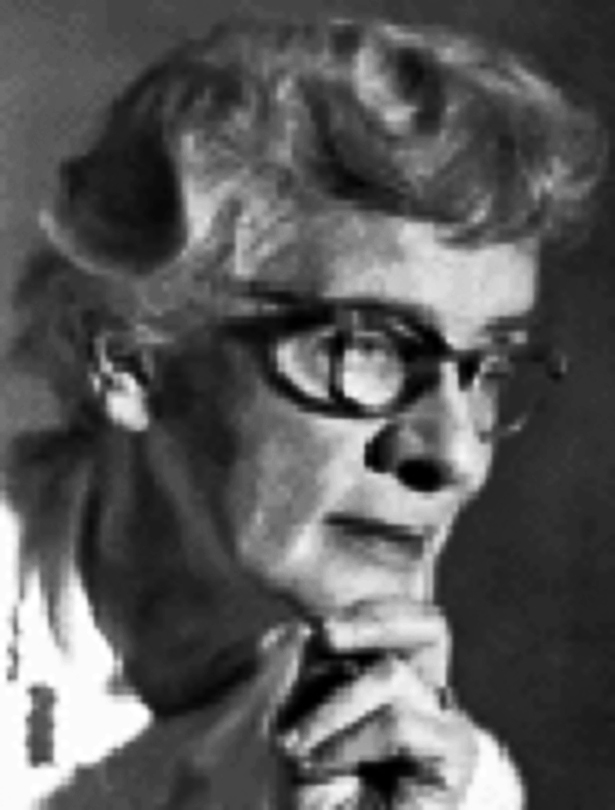
Lauretta Bender

Lauretta Bender (August 9, 1897 – January 4, 1987) was an American child neuropsychiatrist known for developing the Bender-Gestalt Test.

== Early life ==
Bender was born in Butte, Montana, to parents John Oscar and Katherine Irvine Bender. Bender had a difficult time in school when she was young and had to repeat the first grade three times. She often reversed her letters when reading and writing which led people to believe she had some form of intellectual disability. Her father helped her compensate for her dyslexia and she often credited him for making her a strong individual. Her family moved often and she attended high school in Los Angeles where she graduated as valedictorian of her high school class.

== Education ==
Bender earned a BA in 1922 and MA in 1923 from the University of Chicago. She completed her M.D. at State University of Iowa Medical School in 1926 (now the University of Iowa), and this is where she wrote her first scientific publication, Hematological studies on experimental tuberculosis of the guinea pig. After graduation, she spent some time studying overseas, completed an internship at the University of Chicago and conducted research at Henry Phipps Psychiatric Clinic of Johns Hopkins Hospital. Bender completed internships and residencies at Billings Hospital of the University of Chicago, the Boston Psychopathic Hospital, the University of Amsterdam, and the Johns Hopkins University Hospital, and held a Rockefeller Traveling Fellowship that took her to Holland. When she returned to the United States she worked at the Boston Psychopathic Hospital. Because she was not trained as a psychologist, but rather as a medical doctor and psychiatrist, most of her work focused on diagnosing mental disorders in children.

== Personal life ==
Bender met Paul Schilder M.D., PhD (1886–1940) at Johns Hopkins Hospital while writing a publication with him. Schilder was a psychoanalyst from Vienna at the same time as famous psychoanalyst Sigmund Freud. While working together, Bender and Schilder fell in love. Schilder was already married and eleven years older than Bender. In 1930 Bender moved to New York with Schilder. They were married in 1936 after Schilder was divorced. Bender and Schilder had three children together before Schilder was hit by a car and killed. After his death, Bender continued to translate and publish his work. Bender did not remarry until the age of 70 to Henry B. Parkes, PhD. Parkes was a history professor at New York University. He died in 1973, five years after their marriage.

== Career ==
Bender began working at Bellevue Hospital in 1930 after she relocated there with Schilder. She was awarded the position of senior psychiatrist at the Children's Psychiatric Division in 1934, and remained in the position for 21 years. Though her work is used in psychology today, Bender was a psychiatrist and neuropathologist. Most of her work was in diagnosing mental disorders in children. She occasionally worked with certain therapies and used these in her diagnoses. Most of her work involved abandoned children or children whose parents felt that there was something wrong with their child. During the Golden Age of comic books in the post-war period of the 1940s and 1950s, she worked as an advisor of National Comics (now DC Comics) earning $150 per month. In 1954, she testified on behalf of National Comics to defend the industry as a medical expert on children. She also served as the head of the children's psychiatric service at Bellevue Hospital for 21 years starting in 1934. In 1954, she testified at the Senate Subcommittee of Juvenile Delinquency hearings on the effects of crime and horror comic books as a medical expert for National Comics with a job as an advisor for the company.

== Bender and race ==
Unlike many other psychiatrists and psychologists at the time, Bender spent little time considering race as a factor for differences in mental abilities. It was a common belief that African American people were at a lower level of evolution than their Caucasian counterparts. Some of Bender's writings seem to contradict each other; some state that there were significant racial differences, and others state that there is little to no difference in race among children. It is believed, however, that the publications she released regarding the races being evolutionarily different were actually her late husband's work and that she left them unaltered as a form of respect. There is some evidence that even though she rarely wrote about race and racial differences, she may not have ruled out racial primitivity.

At the time, Bender was considered an expert in the psychology of African-American children because most of the children at Bellevue were African American. Although she documented race when conducting her research, she often divided the differences in race into two categories: functional (significant differences that influence behavior) and non-functional (differences have no significant impact on behavior). In short, she believed that there were differences in the races, and some made a difference while others did not. Bender used the word "primitive" to describe French Guinean natives and used the term "civilized" to refer to African Americans. Describing African Americans as "civilized" was not the norm at the time. Bender explained that "primitive" did not mean intellectually different, and that to her it described those who were not exposed to the same education and culture as those she considered "civilized". Though not a Gestaltist, Bender believed that all people are made up of a sum of their parts, and that race was only one factor in what made a person who they are.

== Experiments and therapies ==
While conducting her research, Bender implemented several experimental procedures and used many therapeutic methods. Some of these experiments and therapies, as well as her diagnoses, may be considered inaccurate and unethical by today's standards. However, the zeitgeist of the time was much different than that of today, and many of the procedures used by Bender were used by her contemporaries.

During the 1930s and the 1950s, when Bender was working at Bellevue Hospital, there was little knowledge in the realm of mental disorders. Many childhood psychiatric disorders were attributed to bad behavior or unsatisfactory upbringing. Bender was one of the first to propose that there was something neurologically impaired with these children. Bender diagnosed many children with "childhood schizophrenia", and sought to treat these patients. With more knowledge, clinicians today would likely diagnose these children with developmental or behavioral disorders.

In an attempt to treat those patients diagnosed with childhood schizophrenia, Bender employed electroconvulsive therapy (ECT) after finding that the practice was successful in other applications. ECT was used in an experiment in Paris on children and adolescents in 1940 and showed positive results. In 1947 Bender conducted ECT on 98 children diagnosed with childhood schizophrenia under the age of twelve years. Although only a few of the patients were considered to be in remission of schizophrenia, Bender considered the treatment overall beneficial to all but two or three of the other patients.

Bender considered art as an effective way to diagnose childhood disorders. She used this technique to better understand the psyche of the child. A child's art work was a medium in which a child could express their anxieties and aggression, and allowed the clinician to gain insight into the child's mind. This belief was supported by several case studies, one of which was a study on a six-year-old African American female who was abandoned by her parents, and later sent to Bellevue Hospital in 1943. The child expressed many feelings and past experiences in her artwork. Later it was revealed through her art that she had been sexually abused before she was abandoned. After extensive art, talk, and dream interpretation sessions the child was placed into a foster home and was considered to make an impressive recovery.

In another study, The Body Image of Schizophrenic Children Following Electroshock Therapy, Bender incorporated ECT and a child's self-image. This study used fifteen children with schizophrenia over the age of six. The children were asked to draw portraits of themselves before ECT, immediately after ECT, and fifteen minutes after ECT. The children were exposed to ECT every day, for a mean total of twenty treatments. After each treatment the patients completed the visual motor Gestalt performance test. Patients were followed up with after the treatments had ended. It was observed that the children became more anxious after the treatments had ended, and this was reflected in their drawing; which became more primitive after each ECT treatment. Verbal body image distortions also occurred well after the ECT treatment for that day.

In an attempt to alleviate the symptoms in children, Bender also used lysergic acid diethylamide (LSD 25). Numerous psychiatrists were using LSD treat schizophrenia, as there were no psychotropic medications as such. An example of another controversial treatment for schizophrenia was insulin shock therapy and metrazol treatments. Patients were given large amounts of insulin to induce insulin shock, then given metrazol to induce epileptic convulsions. The use of ECT in psychiatric treatment declined with the advent psychotropic medications, but remains in use for intractable cases of depression.

== The Bender-Gestalt test ==
This test began as being called the visual motor gestalt test and was published in 1938. The basis of this test is that the world as a whole, and what we perceive are made up of many smaller parts that are not immediately recognized when experiencing the whole. The test was developed by Bender to evaluate the maturation of children 4–11 years old and measured how the children responded to the stimuli as a whole. The principles measures in the test are;

(1) Vortical movement, biologically determined in the optic field, gives rise to the most primitive visually perceived forms, such as circles and loops.

(2) Movement, always present, is directional—"clockwise or counterclockwise—"or on a horizontal plane—"dextrad or sinistrad.

(3) By controlling or inhibiting this action-pattern, globes, circles, and arcs are constructed.

(4) This organizes the visual field into foreground and background.

(5) Boundaries between objects are delineated.

(6) Verticalization arises concurrent with body-image maturation as the postural model shifts in the infant from the prone to the upright position.

(7) Crossed lines, diagonal or slanting relations, and angle formations are a later level of maturation, usually occurring at about 6 to 8 years of age.

Bender believed that the lower aged or more primitive abilities were signs of childhood schizophrenia, brain damage, or learning disabilities.

== Other contributions to psychology ==
Bender was a forerunner in proposing that childhood disorders were not always due to poor upbringing. She helped develop the idea that children may have a mental diagnosis contributing to their symptoms. She also believed that there was no one answer to why a child is the way they are; multiple factors much be taken into consideration. Although she did not consider herself a Gestaltist, she made several contributions to the field.

Bender also conducted extensive research on autism. She believed that autism is a type of schizophrenia, and was often one of the first signs. The lack of ability to communicate one's experience of being autistic (due to age) would cause them to be quiet and withdraw, and this was one of the signs of early schizophrenia. Bender was one of the first to extensively observe and document the behaviors of autism, some of which we attribute to those with autism even today. Steve Silberman, the author of Neurotribes, is sharply critical of Bender's therapeutic approach to children with autism. In the 1950s and 1960s, he told an interviewer from The Sun magazine,

"autistic kids were often subjected to seclusion, restraint, and physical punishment by clinicians who did not understand their condition. The head of children's psychiatry at Bellevue Hospital in New York City, Lauretta Bender, administered electroconvulsive therapy to autistic patients and also insulin-shock therapy — administering overdoses of insulin to put them into a short-term coma. She gave them antipsychotic drugs like Thorazine. She also tried giving autistic kids LSD every day for nine months or more, but decided they were becoming 'more anxious.'"

Lauretta Bender also opposed Freudian views of childhood disorders. According to Freud and others, childhood anxiety stemmed from early hostility and aggression. Bender observed that childhood anxiety, aggression, and hostility was often caused by frustration or developmental issues, either physically or environmentally.
