= CAPA =

CAPA, Capa or capa may refer to:

== People ==
- Robert Capa (1913–1954), photographer, brother of Cornell Capa
- Cornell Capa (1918–2008), photographer, brother of Robert Capa
- Edson Carlos Santos Lima Junior (born 1988), Brazilian footballer
- Capa, sometimes used as a nickname for José Raúl Capablanca (1888–1942), the Cuban chess world champion

== Acronyms ==
- Canada Agricultural Products Act, Canadian federal legislation
- Canadian Association for Photographic Art, for photography clubs and individuals
- Canadian Association for Physical Anthropology, based at the University of Western Ontario
- Catholic Association of Performing Arts (UK) (CaAPA); formerly known as the British Catholic Stage Guild
- Certified Automotive Parts Association
- Choice And Partnership Approach, a model for clinical engagement in child psychiatry
- Coalition Against Police Abuse, a community organization in Los Angeles, California
- Columbus Association for the Performing Arts, an arts organization in Columbus, Ohio
- Confederation of Asian and Pacific Accountants
- Corrective and preventive action, a quality control concept used in pharmaceutical and other manufacturing
- Council of Australian Postgraduate Associations
- COVID-19 associated pulmonary aspergillosis, a type of aspergillosis, or fungal infection
- Creative and Performing Arts Program, a magnet program housed at Winston Churchill High School in Livonia, Michigan
- Agence CAPA, a French press agency and production company
- LON-CAPA, a LearningOnline Network with Computer-Assisted Personalized Approach
- Philadelphia High School for the Creative and Performing Arts
- Pittsburgh Creative and Performing Arts School, in downtown Pittsburgh

== Other uses ==
- Capa, South Dakota, a community in the United States
- Robert Capa, a fictional astrophysicist in the 2007 science-fiction film Sunshine
- Capá, a subdivision of Moca, Puerto Rico
- Jyā, koti-jyā and utkrama-jyā (Cāpa), a Sanskrit term for the arc of a circle
- CAPA, a brand name of polycaprolactone

== See also ==
- Capra (disambiguation)
