= Child Guidance =

Child Guidance was both an evolving 20th-century social construct, sometimes called the Child Guidance Movement, and an influential network of multidisciplinary clinics set up to address the problems of childhood and adolescence. It began in the United States and after World War I spread rapidly to Europe, especially to Austria and England, though not to Scotland. It was the first child-centred institutional response to meet perceived child and youth behavioural and mental disorders. It therefore predated the advent of child psychiatry as a medical specialism and of distinct child psychiatric departments as part of modern hospital settings.

Although people working in the child guidance movement were among the first to adopt child psychotherapy as a treatment method and generated a body of mainly psychoanalytic theory on child development based on observation and case studies, they were late in adopting the scientific method.

== History ==
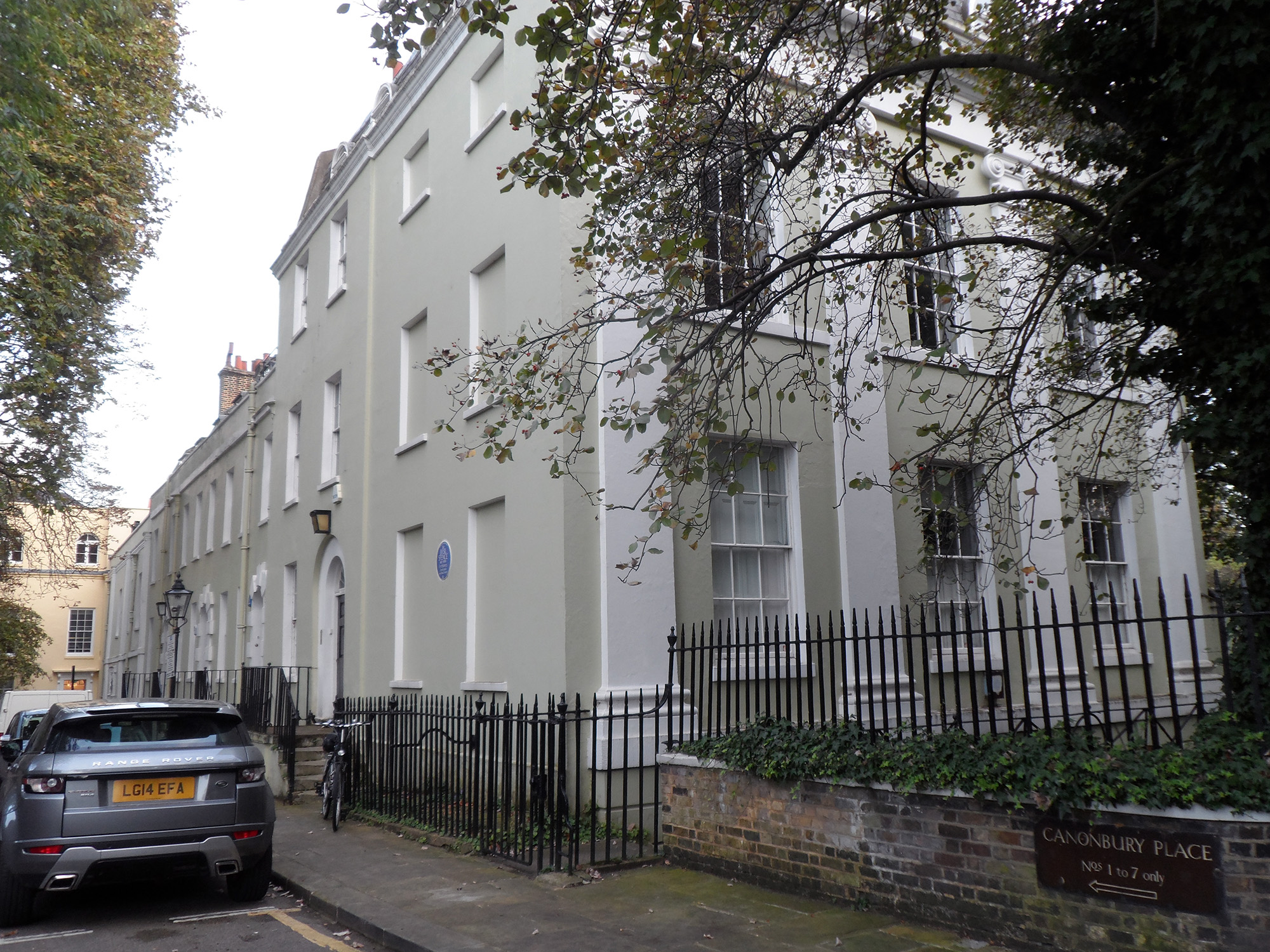
The London Child Guidance Clinic (1929) was originally at "Tudor Lodge" 1, Canonbury Place N1, London. It is now integrated in the Tavistock and Portman NHS Foundation Trust in Swiss Cottage

The movement can be dated to 1906 Chicago as a response to juvenile delinquency, when the city was at the forefront of progressive ideas about legislation and treatment. Striving towards civic advancement and supported by the city's interested professionals such as teachers, social workers, lawyers, academics, doctors, community leaders and politicians, the Juvenile Courts and correctional institutions ended the incarceration of children with adults. In 1921-22 using the Juvenile Psychopathic Institute and the Institute for Juvenile Research as models, the American Child Guidance Demonstration Clinics became established.

In 1919, Alfred Adler started the first child guidance clinic in Vienna. With the collapse of the Austro-Hungarian Empire, the Social Democratic Party of Austria came to power in the newly-formed Austrian Republic. The Social Democrats supported welfare programs with a particular focus on childhood educational reform. The resulting climate enabled Adler and his associates to establish 28 child guidance clinics, and Vienna became the first city in the world to provide schoolchildren with free educational therapy.

England's first child guidance clinic was "The East London Child Guidance Clinic" opened on 21 November 1927, under the direction of Dr Emanuel Miller, with assistance from Meyer Fortes. It was established by the Jewish Health Organisation, aided by the LCC, to help children deemed to have emotional, behavioural and educational difficulties. The Clinic was located in the former Jews Free School in Bell Lane, Spitalfields. A second clinic, the London Child Guidance Clinic, opened under Dr William Moodie in 1929 in Islington. It became the country's main centre for training in child guidance. The first child guidance clinic to open in a voluntary hospital was at Guy's Hospital, London in 1930.

The initial model adopted by child guidance clinics in England was to act as a child and adolescent assessment centre staffed by a lead physician, later a child psychiatrist, assisted by an educational psychologist, or sometimes a clinical psychologist and trained social workers. Referrals would come in the main from schools, nurseries, (juvenile) magistrates, police, general practitioners and parents. The process would be to despatch the social workers to find out the social circumstances of the family, diagnose the child, often predicated on maladjustment, prescribe either treatment in situ of the child by the psychologist or referral on to a specialist institution, such as a special school and advise parents (or a court) accordingly.

During World War II, the mass evacuation of children from cities and their families not only created a vast logistical challenge, but offered a unique opportunity to study the impacts on individuals. In 1944 there were 95 child guidance clinics across England. With the passing of the Education Act 1944, which recognised child guidance clinics as part of the support to mainstream education, that number rose to 300 clinics in 1955.

Just prior and after the war, there was a significant influx of refugee child care specialists to the UK from Europe, many of whom were psychoanalytically trained, and who in time exerted influence within child guidance clinics. Their accent on child development stages and new treatment methods put a strain on the Medical model and hierarchical structure of the clinics and led to inter-professional conflicts. With a changing social landscape in the country and new trends in sociology and culture as well as in criminology, followed by the introduction of Family therapy, the clinics struggled to adapt to new demands.

== Eclipse of the child guidance movement ==
In 1979, Robina Addis founded the Child Guidance Trust in order to pass on her social work knowledge. However, in the second half of the century in the United Kingdom, the movement financed mainly from local government education budgets and limited to an out-patient service, was rivalled by NHS hospital-based departments of child and family psychiatry, (CAMHS), a battle it ultimately lost largely for economic and ideological reasons, arguably to the detriment of children, their families and their communities. A recent commentator (2019) has stated that the lack of investment in contemporary youth mental health services, including in forensic psychiatry, in the UK has not filled the gap left by the absent child guidance clinics which, for all their shortcomings, were at least accessible and focused on children and their families.

== See also ==
- Jane Addams
- John Bowlby
- Anna Freud Centre
- Approved school
- Child and Adolescent Mental Health Services
- Children's Day Hospital
- Frieda Fordham
- Eva Frommer
- Inner London Education Authority
- Melanie Klein
- Hilda Marley
- Royal Hospital for Children, Glasgow
- Royal Hospital for Sick Children, Edinburgh
- Stratheden Hospital
- Tavistock and Portman NHS Foundation Trust
- Clare Winnicott
- Sula Wolff
