= Children's Day Hospital =

The Psychiatric Day Hospital for Children and their Families
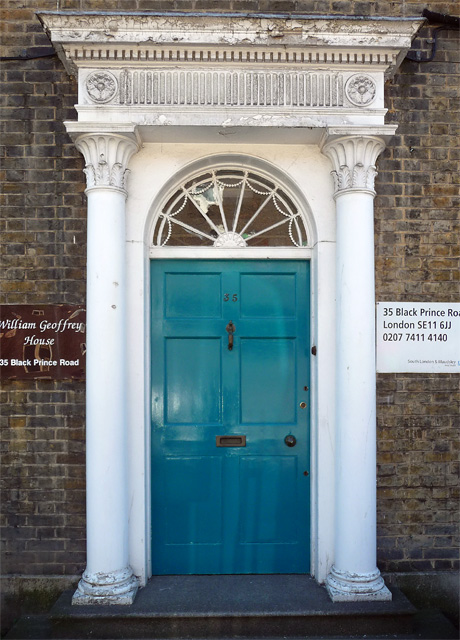
- Detail of 35 Black Prince Road

- Location within Lambeth

Geography
- Location: 35, Black Prince Road, Vauxhall, London, England
- Coordinates: 51.4901°N 0.1154°W

Organisation
- Care system: NHS England
- Affiliated university: St Thomas' Medical School and Nightingale School of Nursing

Services
- Emergency department: No

History
- Founded: 1916 as the Babies' Hostel, 1965 as day facility
- Closed: 1990

Links
- Lists: Hospitals in England

The Children's Day Hospital, or more properly, the Psychiatric Day Hospital for Children and their Families at 35 Black Prince Road, Vauxhall, London was a South London out-patient resource under the aegis of St Thomas' Hospital and the NHS between 1965 and 1990 when it closed. Coincidentally, its existence was co-terminous with that of the Inner London Education Authority, with whose 'Special Schools' service, based in nearby County Hall, there was occasional co-operation. The Day Hospital's distinction was to provide evidence-based treatment added to the Waldorf School system, combined with the prescription of newly developed antidepressant medication to children.

== History ==
=== Origins ===
In a Grade II listed neo-Georgian two-storey building designed in 1913 by Adshead and Ramsey on the Duchy of Cornwall estate in Kennington, a babies' hostel was opened in 1916. For a brief period at the end of World War I, it became the Maxillo-Facial Hospital for wounded soldiers. In 1919, it reverted to its original purpose as a children's nursery. In 1922 wards were opened for babies with feeding problems and the hostel became known as the 'Dietetic Hospital for Sick Babies and Mothers'. At the same time, a training school for nursery nurses was started.

In 1924 Mrs Elizabeth Mitchison passed the lease on the building to the nearby St. Thomas' Hospital in Waterloo in memory of her son, Lieutenant Anthony Mitchison. The hospital was then renamed 'St Thomas's Cornwall Babies' Hostel. It was renamed again in 1927 as the St Thomas's Babies Hospital, becoming affiliated to the Association of Nursery Training Colleges. The hospital offered in-patient treatment for children up to the age of three, diagnosed as premature, malnourished or dyspeptic.

In 1930 an out-patient department was opened where mothers could also be examined and treated. In 1931 33 mothers and 97 children were admitted of whom 22 cases were for the re-establishment of breast-feeding. There were almost 500 out-patient attendances. With the out-break of the Second World War, between 1939 and 1946 the hospital was evacuated first to Crickdale in Wiltshire then in 1942 to Hog's Back in Surrey. In 1962 the hospital began to offer a three-days a week service to disturbed children up to 5 years of age and their parents.

=== The Psychiatric Day Hospital for Children ===
In 1965, with the arrival at St Thomas' Hospital of innovative consultant child psychiatrist, Dr. Eva Frommer, the children's hospital was renamed again, this time as the 'Psychiatric Day Hospital for Children and their Families' and provided full-time out-patient treatment to primary-age children referred to the Department of Child Psychiatry at St. Thomas'. The Sister-in-Charge of the Day Hospital from then on until 1987, was Mrs Mary Reid SRN. The understanding of child development that guided treatment was inspired by Rudolf Steiner and as practised in Waldorf schools. In time, this unique combination attracted attention from across the country and internationally. Professor Kemal Çakmakli, MD has applied Day Hospital techniques in Turkey. The tradition of staff training continued for all disciplines, including: nursery nurses, primary-school teachers, speech therapists, art therapists, music therapists and eurythmy teachers. Other attending staff included, educational psychologists, psychiatric social workers and educational and local government social services staff, as well as senior registrars in child psychiatry on rotation. The Day hospital worked closely with the paediatric department at the main hospital.

The guiding principles were that all young children needed to acquire the skills of understanding and self-expression according to an age-appropriate adjustment to the outside world. The best way to achieve this was through the arts. If this failed, some children could become exceedingly frustrated or depressed. Dr. Frommer was one of the earliest practitioners in the field to identify childhood depression. Her treatment model consisted of exposing her patients to colour, sound, movement, story-telling and in a minority of cases, also to the prescription of antidepressants. This was a controversial approach that attracted both international interest and local criticism from some colleagues. However, Dr Frommer consulted with the children when they felt ready to come off their medication. The Day Hospital and its community activities became a much loved institution and oasis in the concrete jungle that had arisen around it in Lambeth after wartime bombing and the austerity that followed.

Its approach was in marked contrast to the then dominant influence of Kleinian Psychoanalysis in the Child Guidance Movement, as practised for instance, at the Tavistock Clinic, or the other contrasting approach practised at the Anna Freud Centre, both in North London. In the late 1980s the Day Hospital's influence began to wane as Dr. Frommer's energy became severely limited through her illness. She retired in 1989. A year later, the Day Hospital was closed. Although successors were appointed at the main hospital out-patient clinic, the anthroposophic inspiration was gone.

== Present Day Provision ==
After repeated restructuring in the NHS, the Black Prince Road building is now called 'William Geoffrey House' and is used by Lambeth Child and Adolescent Mental Health Service (CAMHS), managed by the South London and Maudsley NHS Foundation Trust.
