= Behavior imaging =

Assessment of behavioral disorders

Behavior imaging is a technique used in behavioral health to diagnose, treat and monitor behavioral disorders, most commonly autism. It involves capturing short video clips of problem behaviors in natural environments on smartphones or other devices.
