= Cynthia Chalk =

Canadian photographer (1913–2018)

Cynthia Chalk (née Jennings; December 9, 1913 – April 5, 2018) was a Canadian photographer.

She was born in Ottawa, Ontario. Chalk was a life member and fellow of the Montreal Camera Club; she co-edited the club's newsletter Cameragram and served as chair of the Nature division of the club. She served on the executives of the National Association for Photographic Arts, later the Canadian Association for Photographic Art, and the Photographic Society of America. Her work has appeared in Outdoors Canada and was included in the National Film Board of Canada exhibit "Photography 75" and in the National Collection of Nature Photographs.

Cynthia married Henry Chalk in 1936.

Cynthia was a Girl Guide Leader and a Founding Member of Montreal's first-ever motorcycle club for women.

Chalk turned 100 in 2013 and died in April 2018 at the age of 104.
