= Child and adolescent psychiatry =

Branch of psychiatry

Child and adolescent psychiatry (or pediatric psychiatry) is a branch of psychiatry that focuses on the diagnosis, treatment, and prevention of mental disorders in children, adolescents, and their families. It investigates the biopsychosocial factors that influence the development and course of psychiatric disorders and treatment responses to various interventions. Child and adolescent psychiatrists primarily use psychotherapy and/or medication to treat mental disorders in the pediatric population.

== Classification of disorders ==
There are many classifications of disorders. Developmental disorders include autism spectrum disorder and learning disorders, and some attention and behaviors disorders are attention deficit hyperactivity disorder, oppositional defiant disorder, and conduct disorder. Childhood schizophrenia is an example of a psychotic disorder. Major depressive disorder, bipolar disorder, persistent depressive disorder, and disruptive mood dysregulation disorder are under the classification of mood disorders.

A wide range of disorders that are classified as eating disorders include anorexia nervosa, bulimia nervosa, binge eating disorder, avoidant/restrictive food intake disorder (ARFID), and pica. Some anxiety disorders are panic disorder, phobias, and Generalized anxiety disorder. Lastly, substance use disorders can be specified to specific substances, such as alcohol use disorder or cannabis use disorder.

Disorders are often comorbid. For example, an adolescent can be diagnosed with both major depressive disorder and generalized anxiety disorder. The incidence of psychiatric comorbidities during adolescence may vary by race, ethnicity and socioeconomic status, among other variables.

== Clinical practice ==
=== Assessment ===
The psychiatric assessment of a child or adolescent starts with obtaining a psychiatric history by interviewing the young person and his/her parents or caregivers. The assessment includes a detailed exploration of the current concerns about the child's emotional or behavioral problems, the child's physical health and development, history of parental care (including possible abuse and neglect), family relationships and history of parental mental illness. It is regarded as desirable to obtain information from multiple sources (for example, both parents, or a parent and a grandparent), as informants may give differing accounts of the child's problems. Collateral information is usually obtained from the child's school with regard to academic performance, peer relationships, and behavior in the school environment.

Psychiatric assessment always includes a mental state examination of the child or adolescent which consists of a careful behavioral observation and a first-hand account of the young person's subjective experiences. This assessment also includes an observation of the interactions within the family, especially the interactions between the child and his/her parents.

The assessment may be supplemented by the use of behavior or symptom rating scales such as the Achenbach Child Behavior Checklist or CBCL, the Behavioral Assessment System for Children or BASC, Conners Comprehensive Behaviour Rating Scale (used for diagnosis of ADHD), Millon Adolescent Clinical Inventory or MACI, and the Strengths and Difficulties Questionnaire or SDQ. While these instruments bring a degree of objectivity and consistency to the clinical assessment, the diagnosis of ADHD requires confirmation by a clinician experienced in evaluating youth with and without ADHD, who supplements the findings with input from parents, teachers, and the youth themselves.

More specialized psychometric testing may be carried out by a psychologist, for example using the Wechsler Intelligence Scale for Children, to detect intellectual impairment or other cognitive problems which may be contributing to the child's difficulties.

=== Diagnosis and formulation ===
The child and adolescent psychiatrist makes a diagnosis based on the pattern of behavior and emotional symptoms, using a standardized set of diagnostic criteria such as the Diagnostic and Statistical Manual (DSM-V) or the International Classification of Diseases (ICD-11). While the DSM system is widely used, it may not adequately take into account social, cultural and contextual factors and it has been suggested that an individualized clinical formulation may be more useful. A case formulation is standard practice for child and adolescent psychiatrists and can be defined as a process of integrating and summarizing all the relevant factors implicated in the development of the patient's problem, including biological, psychological, social and cultural perspectives (the "biopsychosocial model"). The applicability of DSM diagnoses have also been questioned with regard to the assessment of very young children: it is argued that very young children are developing too rapidly to be adequately described by a fixed diagnosis, and furthermore that a diagnosis unhelpfully locates the problem within the child when the parent-child relationship is a more appropriate focus of assessment.

The child and adolescent psychiatrist then designs a treatment plan that considers all the components and discusses these recommendations with the child or adolescent and family.

=== Treatment ===
Treatment will usually involve one or more of the following elements: behavior therapy, cognitive-behavior therapy, problem-solving therapies, psychodynamic therapy, parent training programs, family therapy, and/or the use of medication. The intervention can also include consultation with pediatricians, primary care physicians or professionals from schools, juvenile courts, social agencies or other community organizations.

In a review of existing meta-analyses and disorders on the four most frequent childhood and adolescent psychiatric disorders (anxiety disorder, depression, ADHD, conduct disorder), only for ADHD was the use of medication (stimulants) considered to be the most efficacious treatment option available. For the remaining three disorders, psychotherapy is recommended as the most effective treatment of choice. A combination of psychological and pharmacological treatments is an important option in ADHD and depressive disorders. Treatments for ADHD and anxiety disorders produce higher effect-sizes than do interventions for depressive and conduct disorders.

A 2025 systematic review reinforced the effectiveness of psychosocial interventions for treating disruptive behaviors in youth, especially those involving parental participation. These approaches outperformed usual care in preschool and school-aged children. While medications such as stimulants and antipsychotics offered modest improvements in select cases, they carried a higher risk of side effects, and long-term comparative effectiveness remains unclear. A 2026 systematic review found that in children and adolescents diagnosed with anxiety or depression, mindfulness-based programs probably reduce depression symptoms slightly in the short term but do not appear to improve anxiety.

== Training ==
In the United States, Child and adolescent psychiatric training requires 4 years of medical school, at least 4 years of approved residency training in medicine, neurology, and general psychiatry with adults, and 2 years of additional specialized training in psychiatric work with children, adolescents, and their families in an accredited residency in child and adolescent psychiatry. Child and adolescent sub-speciality training is similar in other Western countries (such as the UK, New Zealand, and Australia), in that trainees must generally demonstrate competency in general adult psychiatry prior to commencing sub-speciality training.

=== Certification and continuing education ===
In the US, having completed the child and adolescent psychiatry residency, the child and adolescent psychiatrist is eligible to take the additional certification examination in the subspecialty of child and adolescent psychiatry from the American Board of Psychiatry and Neurology (ABPN) or the American Osteopathic Board of Neurology and Psychiatry (AOBNP). Although the ABPN and AOBNP examinations are not required for practice, they are a further assurance that the child and adolescent psychiatrist with these certifications can be expected to diagnose and treat all psychiatric conditions in patients of any age competently. Training requirements are listed on the web site of The American Academy of Child & Adolescent Psychiatry.

=== Shortage of child and adolescent psychiatrists in the United States ===
The demand for child and adolescent psychiatrists continues to far outstrip the supply worldwide. There is also a severe maldistribution of child and adolescent psychiatrists, especially in rural and poor, urban areas where access is significantly reduced. A report by the US Bureau of Health Professions (2000) projected a need by the year 2020 for 12,624 child and adolescent psychiatrists, but a supply of only 8,312. In its 1998 report, the Center for Mental Health Services estimated that 9-13% of 9- to 17-year-olds had serious emotional disturbances, and 5-9% had extreme functional impairments. In 1999, however, the Surgeon General reported that "there is a dearth of child psychiatrists." Only 20% of emotionally disturbed children and adolescents received any mental health treatment, a small percentage of which was performed by child and adolescent psychiatrists. Furthermore, the US Bureau of Health Professions projects that the demand for child and adolescent psychiatry services will increase by 100% between 1995 and 2020. More recent estimates from AACAP indicate that as of 2024 there are approximately 10,000 practicing child and adolescent psychiatrists in the United States against a demand that continues to exceed supply; the shortage is estimated at more than 8,000 practitioners needed to meet current mental health needs of children and adolescents.

=== Cross-cultural considerations ===
Steady growth in migration of immigrants to higher-income regions and countries has contributed to the growth and interest in cross-cultural psychiatry. Families of immigrants whose child has a psychiatric illness must come to understand the disorder while navigating an unfamiliar health care system.

== Criticisms ==
=== Subjective diagnoses ===
One criticism against psychiatry is that psychiatric diagnoses lack complete "objectivity," particularly when compared with diagnoses in other medical specialties. However, for several major psychiatric disorders interrater reliability, which shows the degree to which psychiatrists agree on the diagnosis, is generally similar to those in other medical specialties. In 2013, Allen Frances said that "psychiatric diagnosis still relies exclusively on fallible subjective judgments rather than objective biological tests."

Traditional deficit and disease models of child psychiatry have been criticized as rooted in the medical model which conceptualizes adjustment problems in terms of disease states. It is said by these critics that these normative models explicitly characterize problematic behavior as representing a disorder within the child or young person and these commentators assert that the role of environmental influences on behavior has become increasingly neglected, leading to a decrease in the popularity of, for example, family therapy. There are criticisms of the medical model approach from within and without the psychiatric profession (see references): it is said to neglect the role of environmental, family, and cultural influences, to discount the psychological meaning of behavior and symptoms, to promote a view of the "patient" as dependent and needing to be cured or cared for and therefore undermines a sense of personal responsibility for conduct and behavior, to promote a normative conception based on adaptation to the norms of society (the ill person must adapt to society), and to be based on the shaky foundations of reliance on a classificatory system that has been shown to have problems of validity and reliability (Boorse, 1976; Jensen, 2003; Sadler et al. 1994; Timimi, 2006).

=== Prescription of psychotropic medications ===
Since the late 1990s, use of psychiatric medication has become increasingly common for children and adolescents. In 2004 the U.S. Food and Drug Administration (FDA) issued the Black Box Warning on antidepressant prescriptions to alert patients of a research link between use of medication and apparent increased risk of suicidal thoughts, hostility, and agitation in pediatric patients. The most common diagnoses for which children receive psychiatric medication are ADHD, ODD, and conduct disorder.

Some research suggests that children and adolescents are sometimes given antipsychotic drugs as a first-line treatment for mental health problems or behavioral issues other than a psychotic disorder. In the United States, the usage of these drugs in young people has greatly increased since 2000, especially among children from low-income families. More research is needed to specifically assess the efficacy and tolerability of antipsychotic medications in pediatric populations. Because of the risk of metabolic syndrome and cardiovascular events with long-term antipsychotic use, use in pediatric populations is highly scrutinized and recommended in combination with psychotherapy and effective parent-training interventions.

=== Electroconvulsive therapy ===
In 1947, child neuropsychiatrist Lauretta Bender published a study on 98 children aged between four and eleven years old who had been treated in the previous five years with intensive courses of electroconvulsive therapy (ECT). These children received ECT daily for a typical course of approximately twenty treatments. This formed part of an experimental trend amongst a cadre of psychiatrists to explore the therapeutic impact of intensive regimes of ECT, which is also known as either regressive ECT or annihilation therapy. In the 1950s Bender abandoned ECT as a therapeutic practice for the treatment of children. In the same decade the results of her published work on the use of ECT in children was discredited after a study showing that the condition of the children so treated had either not improved or deteriorated. Commenting on his experience as part of Bender's therapeutic program, Ted Chabasinski said that, "It really made a mess of me ... I went from being a shy kid who read a lot to a terrified kid who cried all the time." Following his treatment, he spent ten years as an inmate of Rockland State Hospital, a psychiatric facility now known as the Rockland Psychiatric Center.

== History ==
When psychiatrists and pediatricians first began to recognize and discuss childhood psychiatric disorders in the 19th century, they were largely influenced by literary works of the Victorian era. Authors like the Brontë sisters, George Eliot, and Charles Dickens, introduced new ways of thinking about the child mind and the potential influence early childhood experiences could have on child development and the subsequent adult mind. When the Journal of Psychological Medicine and Mental Pathology, the first psychiatric journal in English, was published in 1848, child psychiatry didn't exist as its own field yet. However, some of the earliest works on the possibility of nervous disorders and "insanity" in children were published in the Journal and several medical writers directly referenced works such as Jane Eyre (1847), Wuthering Heights (1847), Dombey and Son (1848), and David Copperfield (1850), to illustrate this new conceptualization of the child mind. Until that time, it was generally accepted that children were free from nervous disorders and the "passions" that affected the adult mind.

As early as 1899, the term "child psychiatry" (in French) was used as a subtitle in Manheimer's monograph Les Troubles Mentaux de l'Enfance. However, the Swiss psychiatrist Moritz Tramer (1882–1963) was probably the first to define the parameters of child psychiatry in terms of diagnosis, treatment, and prognosis within the discipline of medicine, in 1933. In 1934, Tramer founded the Zeitschrift für Kinderpsychiatrie (Journal of Child Psychiatry), which later became Acta Paedopsychiatria. The first academic child psychiatry department in the world was founded in 1930 by Leo Kanner (1894–1981), an Austrian émigré and medical graduate of the University of Berlin, under the direction of Adolf Meyer at the Johns Hopkins Hospital in Baltimore. Kanner was the very first physician to be identified as a child psychiatrist in the US and his textbook, Child Psychiatry (1935), is credited with introducing both the specialty and the term to the anglophone academic community. In 1936, Kanner established the first formal elective course in child psychiatry at the Johns Hopkins Hospital. In 1944 he provided the first clinical description of early infantile autism, otherwise known as Kanner Syndrome.

Maria Montessori together with It:Giuseppe Ferruccio Montesano and Clodomiro Bonfigli, two distinguished child psychiatrists, created in 1901 in Italy the "Lega Nazionale per la Protezione del Fanciullo" (National League for the Protection of Children). She gradually developed her own pedagogic method, initially based on the "intuition that the question of the 'mentally deficient' was more pedagogic than medical". In 1909, Jane Addams and her female colleagues established the Juvenile Psychopathic Institute (JPI) in Chicago, later renamed as the Institute for Juvenile Research (IJR), the world's first child guidance clinic. Neurologist William Healy, M.D., its first director, was charged with not only studying the delinquent's biological aspects of brain functioning and IQ, but also the delinquent's social factors, attitudes, and motivations, thus it was the birthplace of American child psychiatry.

From its establishment in February 1923, the Maudsley Hospital, a South London-based postgraduate teaching and research psychiatric hospital, contained a small children's department. Similar overall early developments took place in many other countries during the late 1920s and 1930s. In the United States, child and adolescent psychiatry was established as a recognized medical speciality in 1953 with the founding of the American Academy of Child Psychiatry, but was not established as a legitimate, board-certifiable medical speciality until 1959.

The use of medication in the treatment of children also began in the 1930s, when Charles Bradley opened a neuropsychiatric unit and was the first to use amphetamine for brain-damaged and hyperactive children. But it was not until the 1960s that the first NIH grant to study paediatric psychopharmacology was awarded. It went to one of Kanner's students, Leon Eisenberg, the second director of the division.

The discipline has relatively flourished since the 1980s, in large part, because of contributions made in the 1970s, even if the outcomes for patients have been disappointing at times. It was a decade during which child psychiatry witnessed a major evolution as a result of the work carried out by, Eva Frommer, Douglas Haldane, Michael Rutter, Robin Skynner and Sula Wolff, among others. The first comprehensive population survey of 9- to 11-year-olds, carried out in London and the Isle of Wight, which appeared in 1970, addressed questions that have continued to be of importance for child psychiatry; for example, rates of psychiatric disorders, the role of intellectual development and physical impairment, and specific concern for potential social influences on children's adjustment. This work was influential, especially since the investigators demonstrated specific continuities of psychopathology over time, and the influence of social and contextual factors in children's mental health, in their subsequent re-evaluation of the original cohort of children. These studies described the prevalence of ADHD (relatively low as compared to the US), identified the onset and prevalence of depression in mid-adolescence and the frequent co-morbidity with conduct disorder, and explored the relationship between various mental disorders and scholastic achievement.

It was paralleled similarly by work on the epidemiology of autism that was to enormously increase the number of children diagnosed with autism in future years. Although attention had been given in the 1960s and '70s to the classification of childhood psychiatric disorders, and some issues had then been delineated, such as the distinction between neurotic and conduct disorders, the nomenclature did not parallel the growing clinical knowledge. It was claimed that this situation was altered in the late 1970s with the development of the DSM-III system of classification, although research has shown that this system of classification has problems of validity and reliability. Since then, the DSM-IV and DSM-IVR have altered some of the parsing of psychiatric disorders into "childhood" and "adult" disorders, on the basis that while many psychiatric disorders are not diagnosed until adulthood, they may present in childhood or adolescence (DSM-IV). The American Psychiatric Association's DSM is now on its fifth edition (DSM-5).

People in the field are sometimes referred to as "neurodevelopmentalists". As of 2005 there was debate in the field as to whether "neurodevelopmentalist" should be made a new speciality.

In terms of patient outcomes, there is evidence that, in the United Kingdom at least on the 70th anniversary of the NHS, mental health remains a medical "Cinderella" (low priority) and the more so Child and Adolescent Health services which have been through repeated reorganisations and underinvestment all of which leads to disruption and loss of adequate provision.

"Modern neuroscience, genetics, epigenetics, and public health research has presented the tantalizing possibility that it can now be said with relative certainty that much (certainly not all) is understood about why some children struggle and others soar. Although it is an oversimplification, it can now be suggested that it is possible to understand how environmental factors, both negative and positive, influence the genome or epigenome, which in turn influence the structure and function of the brain and thus human thoughts, actions, and behaviors."

== See also ==
- PTSD in children and adolescents
- Mental disorders diagnosed in childhood
- Child Guidance
- Child psychopathology
- Developmental disorders
- Controversy about ADHD
- Child and Adolescent Mental Health Services - NHS service provision in the United Kingdom
