= Hoppa =

Hoppa may refer to:

- Hoppá (film), 1993 Hungarian film
- Hoppa (London Buses), a defunct bus brand
- "Hoppa" (Funda song)
- hoppa (travel company), previously known as Resorthoppa, UK travel company
- Hotel Hoppa, the official transfer bus operation for most Heathrow hotels

People

- DJ Hoppa (born 1983 as Lee Gresh), U.S. music producer and DJ
- John Hopoate (born 1974), rugby league footballer
- Rob Hoppa, Canadian anthropologist
