= CAMH =

CAMH may stand for:

- Centre for Addiction and Mental Health, Toronto
- Child and Adolescent Mental Health Services in the United Kingdom
- Contemporary Arts Museum Houston
