= Child and Adolescent Mental Health Services =

British mental health services for children and adolescents

Child and Adolescent Mental Health Services (CAMHS) is the name for care provided by the NHS and other organisations in the United Kingdom for children, generally until school-leaving age, who have difficulties with their emotional well-being or are deemed to have persistent behavioural problems. The service is also known as Children and Young People's Mental Health Services (CYPMHS). CAMHS offer children, young people and their families access to support for mental health issues from third sector (charity) organisations, school-based counselling, primary care as well as specialist mental health services. The exact services provided may vary, reflecting commissioning and providing arrangements agreed at local level.

== Background ==
Worldwide in 2021, one in seven 10-19 year-olds have mental health problems, with approximately 14% of adolescents experiencing depression, anxiety, and behavioural disorders. In 2020, it was reported that one in six 5-16 year olds in England had a probable mental health difficulty. One in five children and young people aged 8-25 in England had a probable mental disorder in 2023. The restrictions as a response to the COVID-19 pandemic negatively impacted on the mental health of children and young people.

== Tiers framework ==
Since 1995, UK CAMHS have largely been organised around the four-tier framework:

Tier 1
mental health promotion, ill-health prevention work, and general advice and treatment for less severe problems by non-mental health specialists working in universal children's services, such as GPs, school nurses, social workers, and voluntary agencies.

Tier 2
usually CAMHS specialists working in community and primary care, such as mental health workers and counsellors working in clinics, schools and youth services and providing services for children and young people with 'common' mental health problems such as mild-moderate anxiety and depression.

Tier 3
usually a multi-disciplinary team or service working in a community mental health clinic providing a specialised service for more severe disorders, with team members including mental health nurses, psychiatrists, social workers, clinical psychologists, psychotherapists and other therapists.

Tier 4
highly specialist services for children and young people with serious problems, such as day units, specialised outpatient teams and in-patient units.

=== Specialist CAMHS – Tiers 2 to 4 ===
Tiers 2 to 4 are often known as specialist CAMHS. Generally, the higher the tier, the more difficult it is for children and young people, or their carers, to self-refer. Referrals to higher tiers can usually be made by a wide range of agencies and professionals, including GPs and school nurses.

The Health Advisory Service originally deemed that a specialist CAMHS team should include, at the minimum, a child psychiatrist, a child psychologist and a nurse with knowledge and skills in child and adolescent mental health. More developed teams, however, include members from other disciplines such as occupational therapy, psychotherapy, social work and nursery nursing. Most current services are psychiatrist-led, although other models exist and there is limited evidence of what system works best. It is suggested that there should be a consultant psychiatrist for a total population of 75,000, although in most of the UK this standard is not met.

The Tier 4 service includes hospital care or intensive home-based crisis care, with about 1,450 hospital beds provided in England for adolescents aged 13 to 18. Typical conditions that sometime require hospital care include severe emotional disorders (depression and anxiety disorders), psychoses, eating disorders and self-harm that is life threatening. Although hospitals fulfill an important role in overall systems of care, children and young people who are admitted can be at risk of losing touch with family, friends and education.

The service may, depending on locality, include:

- Art therapy
- Child psychiatry
- Clinical psychology
- Drama therapy
- Educational psychology
- Family therapy
- Music therapy
- Occupational therapy
- Peer support
- Play therapy
- Mental health nursing
- Social worker interface
- Speech therapy
- Child psychotherapy
- Forensic CAMHS, working with young offenders or those at risk of offending

== Alternatives to the tiers system ==
In response to the criticisms of the four-tier framework, there have been attempts to transform services using initiatives such as the Choice and Partnership Approach (CAPA), CYP-IAPT (an analogue of the adult Improving Access to Psychological Therapies initiative for children and young people) and 'THRIVE'.

CAPA, developed in the early 2000s, was an initiative designed to improve service effectiveness and the management of service demand and capacity.

CYP-IAPT was a government-supported initiative of the 2010s. Like its adult IAPT counterpart, CYP-IAPT aimed to improve the availability of, and access to, evidence-based psychological therapies. Unlike its adult counterpart, CYP-IAPT did not involve the recruitment and development of new types of workers; instead, it championed the training of existing staff in evidence-based therapies such as cognitive-behavioural therapy, parenting and interpersonal therapy.

THRIVE is a framework for creating coherent and resource-efficient 'communities' of mental health that focuses on clarity around need rather than structures or interventions to meet such needs. THRIVE has been mooted as an alternative to the tiers model with the four tiers being replaced by five (increasingly complex) levels of need: thriving, getting advice, getting help, getting risk support, and getting more help.

== Performance ==
As of December 2016, some young English people with eating disorders were being sent hundreds of miles away to Scotland because the services they required were not available locally. Not withstanding good care in Scotland it was said that being away from friends and family compromised their recovery. In response the government had adopted a policy of ending such arrangements by 2021, and had allocated a cumulative £150M to improve local availability of care. There are concerns that not enough is being done to support people at risk of taking their own lives. 1,039 children and adolescents in England were admitted to beds away from home in 2017–18, many had to travel over 100 miles (160 kilometres) from home. Many had complex mental health issues frequently involving a risk of self-harm or suicide, like severe depression, eating disorders, psychosis and personality disorders.

In 2017-18 at least 539 children assessed as needing Tier 3 child and adolescent mental health services care waited more than a year to start treatment, according to a Health Service Journal survey which elicited reports from 33 out of the 50 mental health trusts. In November 2023, there were 239,715 children and young people who had been referred and were waiting for a CAMHS assessment In England.

According to a collaboratively produced service design model, high-quality CAMHS require:

- rapid access and short waiting times
- teaching practical skills and strategies for self-care
- Individualised support with choice and flexibility
- clear and accessible information
- compassionate and competent staff
- aftercare planning for navigating out of or into other services
- respecting confidentiality and autonomy
- engagement and involvement of children and young people in activities, therapies and decision-making
- collaborative relationships: with children and young people, families and other disciplines and agencies
- a learning culture allowing the team to learn from each other and from those using the services

== Services for mental health crisis ==
Between 2016 and 2020 in Wales, almost 52,000 individual mental health crisis events involving ambulance attendance, A&E visits or emergency admission were recorded amongst 11-24 year olds.

The number of children and young people experiencing mental health crises is increasing but as a result of stretched services and increasing demand there are often lengthy waiting periods before being seen which in turn leads to rising numbers seeking help. Crisis care for children and young people has become a policy priority both in the UK and internationally.

Understanding the different kinds of crisis services and how young people and their families experience help in those situations is crucial for making care better. Many young people and their families have no knowledge about available mental health services or how to access them during times of crisis. As a result emergency departments are commonly used during moments of crisis. For mental health crisis care to be effective people need to know where to access services. Triage or assessment-only services, such as in emergency departments, schools, via phone, text or online, are also effective.

== History ==
In Europe and the United States child-centred mental health did not become a medical specialty until after World War I. In the United Kingdom children's and young people's mental health treatment was for decades the remit of the Child Guidance Movement increasingly working after World War II with local educational authorities and often influenced by psychoanalytic ideas. Provision in NHS hospitals was piecemeal across the country and disconnected from the youth justice system. However opposition to psychoanalysis with its pioneering research work into childhood and adolescence, which was poorly understood by proponents of the medical model, caused the service to be abandoned in favour of evidence-based medicine and evidence-based education. This led to the eclipse of the multidisciplinary child guidance approach in the 1990s and a public policy-motivated formal take-over by the NHS.

The development of CAMHS within a four-tiered framework started in 1995. In 1998, 24 CAMHS Innovation Projects started, and the Crime and Disorder Act 1998 established related youth offending teams. In 2000 the NHS Plan Implementation Programme required health and local authorities to jointly produce a local CAMHS strategy.

Despite the introduction of the four-tier framework in 1995, reports and reviews have consistently described UK children's mental health services as fragmented, uncoordinated, variable, inaccessible and lacking an evidence-base. These include:

- An Audit Commission report in 1999
- The 2008 independent CAMHS Review
- The 2012 annual report of England's Chief Medical Officer
- Future in Mind, a 2015 government review of children and young people's mental health and mental health services
- A 2016 Children's Commissioner for England lightning review
- A 2018 National Assembly for Wales report

From about 2013 onward major concerns have been expressed about reductions in CAMHS, and apparently increasing demand, and in 2014 the parliamentary Health Select Committee investigated and reported on provision. In 2015 the government published a review, and promised a funding increase of about £250 million per year. However the funds were not ring-fenced and as of 2016 only about half of England's clinical commissioning groups had increased local CAMHS funding. CAMHS funding remains a popular topic for political announcements of funding and the current aim is to increase funding to the level that 35% of young people with a disorder are able to receive a specialist service. Different models of service organisation are also advocated as part of this transformation.

In Scotland, between 2007 and 2016 the number of CAMHS psychologists had doubled, reflecting increased demand for the service. However in September 2020, 53.5% of CAMHS patients in Scotland had waited for an appointment longer than the 18 weeks target, and in Glasgow the average waiting time was 26 weeks.

Current policy in England is based on the Green Paper (2017) and the NHS Mental Health Implementation Plan (2019). It focuses on mental health promotion, mental ill-health prevention and early intervention, workforce expansion, community-based mental support teams (including school-based mental health workers), and 24/7 crisis services. Services are expected to cover the 0-25s (rather than 0-17s). The 2019 implementation plan has been disrupted by the COVID-19 pandemic which has led to increased demand for CAMHS and an impact on the availability of appropriately trained staff.

== See also ==
- Child Guidance
- Mental health in the United Kingdom
- Mental health trust
