= Hilda Marley =

British psychologist and educationist (1876–1951)

Hilda Marley OBE
- Sister Marie Hilda in the 1930s, from a 2012 publication.
- Born: Hilda Gertrude Marley; 13 October 1876; Bishop Auckland
- Died: 19 November 1951 (aged 75); Glasgow
- Other names: Sister Marie Hilda
- Occupation(s): Educator, psychologist, religious sister

Hilda Gertrude Marley OBE (13 October 1876 – 19 November 1951), known in her religious order as Sister Marie Hilda, was a British educator, psychologist and Roman Catholic religious sister.

== Early life and education ==
Hilda Marley was born in Bishop Auckland in 1876, the daughter of George Marley and Marie Anne Caroline Simonds. Her father was a miller. She moved with her family to Wynberg in 1879, and attended convent schools in South Africa and England. She trained as a teacher at the Notre Dame Training College for Teachers in Liverpool. In 1910 she earned a bachelor's degree in history from the University of London. She pursued further studies in psychology at Louvain University.

== Career ==
In 1901, Marley became a sister in the Roman Catholic teaching order of Notre Dame de Namur. Bailey (or Sister Marie Hilda, as she was known) taught psychology at the Notre Dame Training College in Dowanhill, Glasgow, from 1904 to 1941. In 1931, she co-founded and directed the Notre Dame Child Guidance Clinic with a colleague, Robert Robertson Rusk. It was the first child guidance clinic in Scotland. She published a textbook, and spoke internationally on child guidance. She was frequently called upon to defend her work in the context of her religious vocation, especially when she engaged with modern and secular psychological ideas.

Marley became a fellow of the British Psychological Society in 1942. She was vice president of the Guild of Catholic Social Workers in 1943. In 1944, she was vice president of the Scottish branch of the British Psychological Society, and was appointed to the Scottish Advisory Council on the Treatment and Rehabilitation of Juvenile Offenders. In 1947 the Archbishop of Glasgow presented Marley with the Cross Pro Ecclesia et Pontifice, and she became a fellow of the Educational Institute of Scotland. In 1951 she was vice president of the Catholic International Congress of Psychiatrists and Psychotherapists. She served on the executive board of the Scottish Association for Mental Hygiene.

== Personal life ==
Marley was deaf, and under 5 feet in height. She was named to the Order of the British Empire just before she died in 1951, aged 75 years, in Glasgow. Her clinic in Glasgow is now part of the Notre Dame Centre.
