= Choice and Partnership Approach =

Psychiatric model of engagement and clinical assessment

The Choice and Partnership Approach (CAPA) is a model of engagement and clinical assessment, principally used in child and adolescent psychiatric services. It aims to use collaborative ways of working with service users to enhance the effectiveness of services and user satisfaction with services.

== Origins ==
The CAPA model was developed in the early 2000s in two English NHS trust providers. Originally it was an initiative designed to improve service effectiveness and the management of service demand and capacity in UK Child and Adolescent Mental Health Services (CAMHS).

== Model ==
CAPA focuses on the experience of the service user. It is a collaborative model where the clinicians providing the assessment act as facilitators for the user and their family. Once a referral is accepted by the service, the user is contacted to arrange a convenient time for an appointment. This is the Choice Appointment. The possible outcomes of this appointment are that the client;

- Decides they do not need further service
- They are referred to another provider
- They receive further appointments and work with a clinician in the service

The appointment tries to be collaborative and strengths based. Once a user is accepted, they enter the Partnership phase. The clinician continues to act as a facilitator with expertise rather than an expert with power. The work is composed of aspects that are Core work and parts that are Specialist work.

== Principles underlying the model ==
The model is based on transparent collaboration, finding user strengths and developing a shared formulation. The original model refers to 11 key components, all of which should be implemented to work the best.

1. Management leadership
2. Language
3. Handle demand
4. Choice framework
5. Full booking to Partnership
6. Selecting Partnership clinician by skill
7. Extended clinical skills in core work
8. Job planning
9. Goal setting and care planning
10. Peer group supervision
11. Team away days

The work is also guided by the 7 Helpful Habits.

- Handle Demand
- Extend Capacity
- Let Go of Families
- Process Map
- Flow management
- Use Care Bundles
- Look After Staff
