= Epidemiology of child psychiatric disorders =

Study of child and adolescent psychiatric conditions

The epidemiology of child psychiatric disorders is the study of the incidence, prevalence, and distribution of conditions in child and adolescent psychiatry. Subfields of pediatric psychiatric epidemiology include developmental epidemiology, which focuses on the genetic and environmental causes of child psychiatric disorders. The field of pediatric psychiatric epidemiology finds widely varying rates of childhood psychiatric disorders, depending on study population, diagnostic method, and cultural setting.

== Prevalence of mental illness ==
A 2016 study conducted in the United States found that 17.4% of children between the ages of 2 and 8 have a mental, behavioral, or mental health disorder. Epidemiological research conducted in 2005 has shown that between 3% and 18% of children have a psychiatric disorder causing significant functional impairment (reasons for these widely divergent prevalence rates are discussed below) and a median prevalence estimate of 12% has been proposed. Using a different statistical method, a proposed prevalence rate for all mental disorders in children was 14.2%.

=== England ===
Between 2005 and 2017, the number of adolescents (12 to 17 years) who were prescribed antidepressants has doubled. On the other hand, antidepressant prescriptions for children aged 5-11 decreased between 1999 and 2017.

From April 2015, prescription increased for both age groups (for people aged 0 to 17) and peaked during the first COVID lockdown in March 2020.

Between 1998 and 2017, children and adolescents living in deprived areas were more often prescribed antidepressants while Black, Asian and minority ethnic (BAME) teenagers were less likely to receive prescriptions than their White peers.

== Developmental epidemiology ==
Developmental epidemiology seeks to "disentangle how the trajectories of symptoms, environment, and individual development intertwine to produce psychopathology".

=== Socio-economic influences ===
Mental illness in childhood and adolescence is associated with parental unemployment, low family income, being on family income assistance, lower parental educational level, and single-parent, blended or stepparent families.

== Methodological issues ==
Epidemiological research has produced widely divergent estimates, depending on the nature of the diagnostic method (e.g. structured clinical interview, unstructured clinical interview, self-report or parent-report questionnaire), but more recent studies using DSM-IV-based structured interviews produce more reliable estimates of clinical "caseness". Past research has also been limited by inconsistent definitions of clinical disorders, and differing upper and lower age limits of the study population. Changing definitions over time have given rise to spurious evidence of changing prevalence of disorders. Furthermore, almost all epidemiological surveys have been carried out in Europe, North America and Australia, and the cross-cultural validity of DSM criteria have been questioned, so it is not clear to what extent the published data can be generalized to developing countries.

== See also ==
- Epidemiology of autism

General:

- Prevalence of mental disorders
- Mental disorders diagnosed in childhood
- Child and adolescent psychiatry
