= Rob Hoppa =

Canadian physical anthropologist

Robert Hoppa is a Canadian physical anthropologist who held a Canada Research Chair in Skeletal Biology. A Professor at the University of Manitoba he conducts research on the health of past populations.

Robert Hoppa has served as president of the Canadian Association for Physical Anthropology.

== Education ==
- 1991 – 1996 Ph.D. (Physical Anthropology). Department of Anthropology, McMaster University.
- 1990 -1991 M.Sc.(Osteology, Palaeopathology and Funerary Archaeology). Department of Archaeology and Prehistory, University of Sheffield, and Department of Archaeological Sciences, University of Bradford.
- 1986 -1990 B.Sc. (Physical Anthropology) Department of Anthropology, University of Toronto.
