= Public Law 99-457 =

Public Law 99-457 is the result of amendments by the United States Congress, in 1986, to the Education of the Handicapped Act. Public Law 99-457 added preschool children to the Public Law 91-230 provisions.

Public Law 99-457 necessitates states to make available appropriate and free public education to children ages 3 through 5 who are disabled. The law makes a requirement for states that offer interdisciplinary educational services to disabled toddlers, infants, and their families to receive financial grants. These financial grants act as incentives for states to provide for children from birth to age 2 that have disabilities. Public Law 99-457 also stimulates the development and validation of infant development schedules and tests.
