= Henry Bamford Parkes =

British historian (1904–1972)

- Born: 13 November 1904; Sheffield, England
- Died: 7 January 1972 (aged 67)

Academic background
- Education: University of Michigan

Academic work
- Discipline: history
- Institutions: New York University

Henry Bamford Parkes (13 November 1904 – 7 January 1972) was a writer and professor of history at New York University. He was born in Sheffield, England.

== Education and career ==
After reading history at Oxford University, Parkes came to the United States to pursue his graduate studies at the University of Michigan. He received his Ph.D. from Michigan in 1929 and joined the history faculty of New York University in 1930. He had also lectured at Barnard College, the University of Wyoming, the New School for Social Research and the University of Washington. From 1956 to 1957, Parkes was a Fulbright Fellow, working at the University of Athens in Greece.

== Books ==
- Parkes, Henry Bamford (1930). Jonathan Edwards, the Fiery Puritan. New York: Minton, Balch & Company. p. 271 pp.
- Parkes, Henry Bamford (1938). A History of Mexico. Houghton Mifflin.
  Note: a third edition was published in 1960.
- Parkes, Henry Bamford (1939). Marxism: An Autopsy.
- Parkes, Henry Bamford (1942). The Pragmatic Test.
- Parkes, Henry Bamford (1942). Recent America.
- Parkes, Henry Bamford (1942). The World After War.
- Parkes, Henry Bamford (1947). The American Experience.
- Parkes, Henry Bamford (1953). The United States of America.
- Parkes, Henry Bamford (1959). Gods and Men: The Origins of Western Culture. New York: Vintage Books. p. 489 pp.
- Parkes, Henry Bamford (1969). The Divine Order: Western Culture in the Middle Ages and the Renaissance. New York: Knopf. p. 480 pp.
