= Eva Frommer =

Consultant child psychiatrist

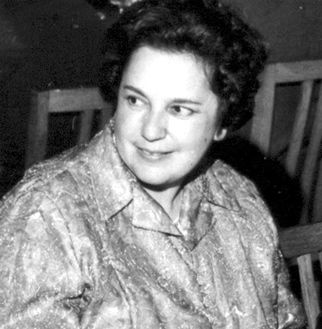
- Frommer c. 1965
- Born: 1927; Berlin, Germany
- Died: 8 August 2004 (aged 76−77); Forest Row, England
- Citizenship: British
- Education: Royal Free Hospital
- Known for: Attention to separation effects in parenting and pre-school children, prescribing antidepressants to children, "Diagnosis and Treatment in Clinical Child Psychiatry", hospital-based art therapies and Eurythmy
- Scientific career
- Fields: Child psychiatry, Anthroposophy, Art therapy
- Workplaces: Maudsley Hospital, St Thomas' Hospital, London

Eva Ann Frommer FRCPsych (6 September 1927 – 8 August 2004) was a German-born British consultant child psychiatrist, working at St Thomas' Hospital in South London. Her specialism was to apply the arts and eurythmy to the treatment of pre-school child patients, inspired by the work of the Austrian anthroposophist, Rudolf Steiner. Early in her career she attracted criticism through association with her senior colleague, the controversial psychiatrist William Sargant, whom she followed for a time in the application of sleep therapy and antidepressant prescription to children.

As a child, she became part of the Jewish exodus fleeing from persecution in Nazi Germany. Frommer was a great promoter of the arts for children and was modestly a philanthropist.

== Early life ==
Frommer was born in Berlin into a highly cultured German-Polish-Jewish family, the elder of two children. Her father, Leopold (1894–1943), was a research scientist and friend of the crystallographer and philosopher, Rudolf Steiner. He is the author of a standard textbook on chemical engineering still in use. Her mother, Jadwiga, was a professional violinist and came from the Polish Diamant family. It is possible that Frommer's date of birth was altered to make her two or three years younger, to facilitate the family's move to England in 1934, since she maintained she had sat on Steiner's knee as a baby and Steiner died in 1925. Once settled in London, she and her brother attended the Steiner-inspired New School in Streatham, South London, which later moved to Sussex and became known as Michael Hall. Both children had inherited their mother's musical talent, but Eva chose to study medicine, while her brother, Michael, dedicated himself to music.

== Career ==
After graduating from the Royal Free Hospital in 1952, she obtained a diploma in Child Health (DCH) with a view to becoming a paediatrician. However, she pursued a different specialism at the celebrated Maudsley Hospital gaining her DPM in 1962. After a spell working in Sutton in Surrey, she was appointed consultant child psychiatrist at St Thomas' Hospital in London where, for a time, she collaborated with the controversial psychiatrist, William Sargant, applying some of his treatments in modified form to child patients. She also contributed to one of his publications. This gained her a level of notoriety that she never quite lived down. She became a Foundation Member of the Royal College of Psychiatrists in 1972 and a Fellow in 1982.

At St Thomas' along with running the out-patient clinic for children, she conducted research and gathered around her a multidisciplinary group of practitioners. Frommer was one of the earliest in the field to identify childhood depression. Part of it she believed was due to parental experiences of separation from their own parents. When she was practising, many World War II evacuees had become parents and their children were displaying the disturbances Frommer had discovered. In some cases, she prescribed newly developed antidepressant medications in very small doses. This was a controversial approach that attracted both international interest and local criticism from some colleagues. Another innovation was to establish formal links with the burgeoning Art Therapy movement. Frommer offered internships in her department to art therapy students from the original St Alban's School of Art course, followed by students from other London courses.

As part of her repertoire of treatments, she developed the hospital's children's out-post in Black Prince Road, about half a mile from the main hospital, as a treatment centre, headed by a senior nurse, Mrs Mary Reid.

=== The Children's Day Hospital ===
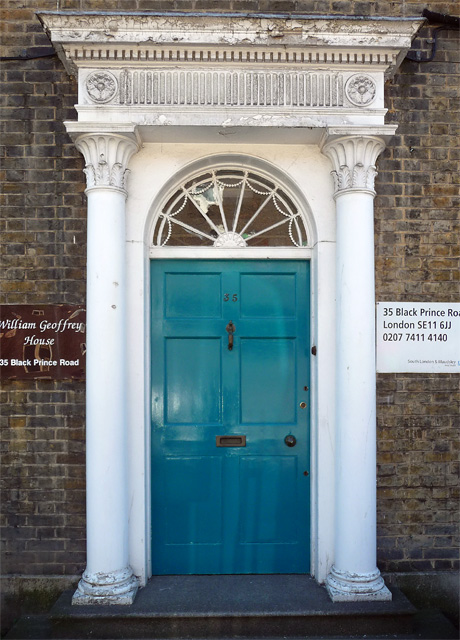
Entrance to 35 Black Prince Road, Lambeth, formerly The Children's Day Hospital

Frommer's view was that children needed to acquire the skills of understanding and self-expression according to an age-appropriate adjustment to the outside world, to stand a chance of avoiding depression or falling into antisocial behaviours. Her treatment model consisted of exposing her pre-school patients to colour, sound, eurythmy, story-telling and plays. The treatment was predicated on Rudolf Steiner's educational system. There was an emphasis on staff training and special retreat days with invited guest facilitators, such as the Royal Shakespeare Company's voice-coach, Cicely Berry, who was a friend of Frommer's. The institution attracted wide interest including from abroad. For instance, Professor Kemal Çakmakli, MD has applied Day Hospital techniques in Turkey.

== Later years ==
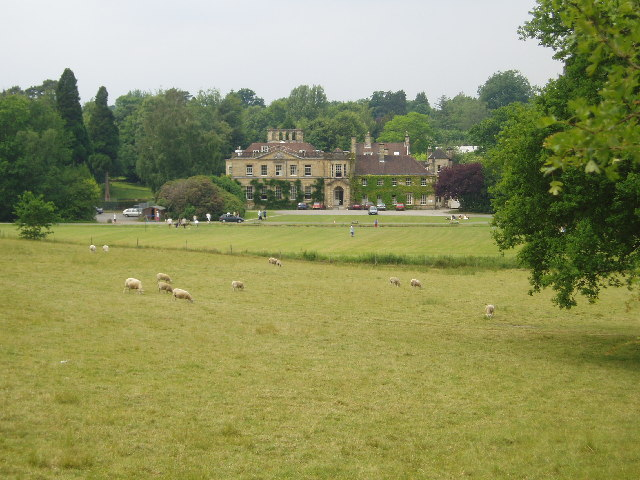
Michael Hall, the Steiner School in Forest Row, East Sussex

Frommer was an avid theatre-goer and lover and supporter of opera. She was a well-known figure at both of London's opera houses and was for many years a Friend of the Royal Opera House. She was active in the charity sector, making links with City Livery companies to benefit her patients. She became Chairman of the Cicely Northcote Trust for a number of years.

Frommer travelled widely and gave numerous papers at international conferences. She also travelled for pleasure. It was after the strain of a trip to China in the mid-1980s, that she returned to England, to face a diagnosis of non-kinetic Parkinson's disease and an auto-immune condition. In spite of these afflictions, she carried on with her clinics and Steiner Study groups until 1989, when she retired to Sussex, where her mother had had a home. The Children's Day Hospital was closed in 1990. Eva Frommer died, aged 77, at Michael Hall, a Steiner community and school in Forest Row, England.

== Legacy ==
Eva Frommer was one of the earliest practitioners to establish an out-patient therapeutic milieu for very young children and their parents, especially, but not only, those from deprived backgrounds. She not only afforded them exposure to the arts, but she invited students and members of the art establishment to contribute to that milieu. The arts in health settings have become commonplace. A successful businessman in antiquities has paid express tribute to her.

Outside the clinical field, Frommer intended that Steiner's writings become better known in English-speaking countries, and for that purpose she left a sum of money to Steiner Books to enable them to translate and publish all of his works, a task she had started but was prevented from completing in her lifetime.

== Publications ==
Her publications include:

- Voyage through Childhood into the Adult World – A Guide to Child Development, London: Pergamon. 1969. ISBN 978-1869890599
- Diagnosis and Treatment in Clinical Child Psychiatry, London: Heinemann Educational Books. 1972. ISBN 978-0433109105
- Frommer, Eva, and O'Shea, Gillian. 'The Importance of Childhood Experience in relation to Problems of Marriage and Family-Building', The British Journal of Psychiatry, Aug 1973, 123 (573) 157–160; doi:10.1192/bjp.123.2.157
