= Andersen healthcare utilization model =

Medical model

The Andersen healthcare utilization model is a conceptual model aimed at demonstrating the factors that lead to the use of health services. According to the model, the usage of health services (including inpatient care, physician visits, dental care etc.) is determined by three dynamics: predisposing factors, enabling factors, and need. Predisposing factors can be characteristics such as race, age, and health beliefs. For instance, an individual who believes health services are an effective treatment for an ailment is more likely to seek care. Examples of enabling factors could be family support, access to health insurance, one's community, etc. Need represents both perceived and actual need for health care services. The original model was developed by Ronald M. Andersen, a health services professor at UCLA, in 1968. The original model was expanded through numerous iterations, and its most recent form models past the use of services to end at health outcomes and includes feedback loops.

== Access and mutability ==
A major motivation for the development of the model was to offer measures of access. Andersen discusses four concepts within access that can be viewed through the conceptual framework. Potential access is the presence of enabling resources, allowing the individual to seek care if needed. Realized access is the actual use of care, shown as the outcome of interest in the earlier models. The Andersen framework also makes a distinction between equitable and inequitable access. Equitable access is driven by demographic characteristics and need, whereas inequitable access is a result of social structure, health beliefs, and enabling resources.

Andersen also introduces the concept of mutability of his factors. The idea here being that if a concept has a high degree of mutability (can be easily changed) perhaps policy would be justified in using its resources to do rather than a factor with low mutability. Characteristics that fall under demographics are quite difficult to change, however, enabling resources is assigned a high degree of mutability as the individual, community, or national policy can take steps to alter the level of enabling resources for an individual. For example, if the government decides to expand the Medicaid program, an individual may experience an increase in enabling resources, which in turn may beget an increase in health services usage. The RAND Health Insurance Experiment (HIE) changed a highly mutable factor, out-of-pocket costs, which greatly changed individual rates of health services usage.

== Earlier models ==
The initial behavior model was an attempt to study of why a family uses health services. However, due to the heterogeneity of family members, the model focused on the individual rather than the family as the unit of analysis. Andersen also states that the model functions both to predict and explain use of health services.

A second model was developed in the 1970s in conjunction with Aday and colleagues at the University of Chicago. This iteration includes systematic concepts of health care such as current policy, resources, and organization. The second generation model also extends the outcome of interest beyond utilization to consumer satisfaction.

The next generation of the model builds upon this idea by including health status (both perceived and evaluated) as outcomes alongside consumer satisfaction. Furthermore, this model includes personal health practices as an antecedent to outcomes, acknowledging that it not solely use of health services that drive health and satisfaction. This model emphasizes a more public health approach of prevention, as advocated by Evans and Stoddart wherein personal health practices (i.e., smoking, diet, exercise) are included as a driving force towards health outcomes.

== Current model ==
The 6th iteration of Andersen's conceptual framework focuses on the individual as the unit of analysis and goes beyond health care utilization, adopting health outcomes as the endpoint of interest. This model is further differentiated from its predecessors by using a feedback loop to illustrate that health outcomes may affect aspects such as health beliefs, and need. It added genetic susceptibility as a predisposing determinant and quality of life as an outcome. By using the framework's relationships, we can determine the directionality of the effect following a change in an individual's characteristics or environment. For example, if one experiences an increase in need as a result of an infection, the Andersen model predicts this will lead to an increased use of services (all else equal). One potential change for a future iteration of this model is to add genetic information under predisposing characteristics. As genetic information becomes more readily available, it seems likely this could impact health services usage, as well as health outcomes, beyond what is already accounted for in the current model.

== Criticisms and rebuttals ==
The model has been criticized for not paying enough attention to culture and social interaction, but Andersen argues this social structure is included in the predisposing characteristics component. Another criticism was the overemphasis of need and at the expense of health beliefs and social structure. However, Andersen argues need itself is a social construct. This is why need is split into perceived and evaluated. Where evaluated need represents a more measurable/objective need, perceived need is partly determined by health beliefs, such as whether people think their condition is serious enough to seek health services. Another limitation of the model is its emphasis on health care utilization or adopting health outcomes as a dichotomous factor, present or not present. Other help-seeking models also consider the type of help source, including informal sources. More recent work has taken help-seeking behaviors further, and more real-world, by including online and other non-face-to-face sources.
