= Canadian Association for Physical Anthropology =

Learned society based in Canada

The Canadian Association for Physical Anthropology / L'Association Canadienne D'Anthropologie Physique (CAPA/ACAP) is a learned society of international scholars and students of Physical Anthropology in Canada. The associations's mission is to promote and increase awareness and understanding of physical (biological) anthropology among its membership and to support institutions, agencies, and the public at large. The association is guided by a constitution and code of ethics, holds annual meetings, distributes biannual newsletters to its membership, and offers funding opportunities for student members. The current president in 2017 is Dr. Ian Colquhoun (University of Western Ontario).

== Mission statement ==
The mission statement of CAPA/ACAP, as listed on the website, is as follows: "The Canadian Association of Physical Anthropology / L'Association Canadienne D'Anthropologie Physique is a learned society of international scholars and students whose aim is to promote and increase awareness and understanding of physical (biological) anthropology among its membership, as well as to supporting institutions and agencies and the public at large. Physical anthropologists study adaptation, variability and evolution in a biocultural context. Our members recognize and celebrate the geographic and temporal diversity and complexity of ancient and modern humankind, our hominid forebears and our nonhuman primate cousins and their ancestors. As such, our discipline is inherently multidisciplinary, crossing the boundaries between the natural and social sciences, in order to provide a richer understanding of human diversity and complexity."

This statement is upheld by the CAPA-ACAP Constitution and Code of Ethics (2015).

== Founding of the association ==
The Canadian Association for Physical Anthropology/L'Association Canadienne d'Anthropologie Physique (CAPA-ACAP) was founded during the 1972 meeting of the American Association of Physical Anthropologists. Founding members Drs. Frank Auger (Université de Montréal/Deceased), Charles Eyman (University of Calgary/Deceased), Geoff Gaherty (McMaster University), Jamshed Mavalwala (University of Toronto), James Paterson (University of Calgary), and Christopher Meiklejohn (University of Winnipeg) felt Canadian physical anthropologists should not have to travel to the United States to meet each other professionally. The first annual meeting was held in Banff in February 1973, where Drs. Frank Auger, Braxton Alfred, and Chris Meiklejohn were elected president, secretary/treasurer, and newsletter editor, respectively.

== Executive officer positions ==
CAPA-ACAP initially had three executive officer positions: president, secretary-treasurer, and newsletter editor. In 2003, the position of student representative was added to provide student members with a more active voice within the association. With the launch of the first CAPA-ACAP website in 1997, the position of webmaster was created. In 2014, the new CAPA-ACAP website was launched, along with a change in the title of webmaster to website editor. More information regarding the roles and responsibilities of the executive officers, as well as a list of past officers, is available on the CAPA-ACAP website.

== Publications ==
The association began a newsletter in 1976 to keep the membership apprised of relevant events on a regular basis. In 1979, the newsletter was transformed into a journal, the Canadian Review of Physical Anthropology, which published four volumes. In 1983, 1985, and 1986, topics typically covered in the newsletter were incorporated into the Canadian Journal of Anthropology to reduce publication costs. Due to the cost involved in publishing a journal that had low circulation beyond the membership, the journal Canadian Review of Physical Anthropology was discontinued in 1985. Since then, the association continues to publish a biannual newsletter, including topics relevant for the membership, articles, minutes from the annual meeting, reports from the executive officers and so forth.

The association has also published three other volumes. First, papers presented at an international symposium in honor of Davidson Black, the Canadian anatomist who named Sinanthropus pekinensis in 1927, were published in a volume titled "Homo Erectus: Papers in Honor of Davidson Black" edited by Sigmon and Cybulski (1981). Second, CAPA-ACAP partially sponsored two symposia during the 1983 International Congress of Anthropological and Ethnological Sciences in Vancouver, which led to "Out of Asia: Peopling of the Americas and the Pacific" edited by Kirk and Szathmáry (1985). Finally, a symposium discussing the impact of opening of the Iron Curtain on academia during the 1991 CAPA-ACAP meeting in Hamilton resulted in the edited volume "Before the Wall Fell: The Science of Man in Socialist Europe" edited by Sigmon (1993).

== Annual meetings ==
CAPA-ACAP has held an annual meeting since its founding in 1973. A list of the location of the annual meetings and hosting institutions is provided below and more details are available on the CAPA-ACAP website.

#	Year	Location	Hosting institution
47	2019	Banff, AB	University of Calgary
46	2018	London, ON	The University of Western Ontarion
45	2017	Edmonton, AB	University of Alberta
44	2016	Peterborough, ON	Trent University
43	2015	Winnipeg, MB	University of Manitoba
42	2014	Fredericton, NB	University of New Brunswick
41	2013	Scarborough, ON	University of Toronto
40	2012	Victoria, BC	Universities of Victoria and Northern British Columbia
39	2011	Montréal, QC	Université de Montréal
38	2010	Saskatoon, SK	University of Saskatchewan
37	2009	Vancouver, BC	Simon Fraser University
36	2008	Hamilton, ON	McMaster University
35	2007	Banff, AB	University of Calgary
34	2006	Peterborough, ON	Trent University
33	2005	Winnipeg, MB	University of Manitoba
32	2004	London, ON	University of Western Ontario
31	2003	Edmonton, AB	University of Alberta
30	2002	Ottawa, ON	Canadian Museum of Civilization
29	2001	Winnipeg, MB	University of Manitoba
28	2000	Burlington, ON	McMaster University
27	1999	Fredericton, NB	University of New Brunswick
26	1998	Calgary, AB	University of Calgary
25	1997	London, ON	University of Western Ontario
24	1996	Kingston, ON	Queen's University
23	1995	Las Vegas, NV	University of Nevada
22	1994	Windsor, ON	University of Windsor
21	1993	St. John's, NL	Memorial University of Newfoundland
20	1992	Edmonton, AB	University of Alberta
19	1991	Hamilton, ON	McMaster University
18	1990	Banff, AB	University of Calgary
17	1989	Vancouver, BC	Simon Fraser University
16	1988	Peterborough, ON	Trent University
15	1987	Lake Simcoe, ON	University of Toronto
14	1986	Montréal, QC	Université de Montréal
13	1985	Thunder Bay, ON	Lakehead University
12	1984	Edmonton, AB	University of Alberta
11	1983	Montréal, QC	Université de Montréal
10	1982	Guelph, ON	University of Guelph
9	1981	Banff, AB	University of Calgary
8	1980	Ottawa, ON	Canadian Museum of Civilization
7	1979	Ste-Adèle, QC	Université de Montréal
6	1978	Niagara-on-the-Lake, ON	University of Toronto
5	1977	Banff, AB	University of Calgary
4	1976	Cedar Glen, ON	University of Toronto
3	1975	Winnipeg, MB	University of Manitoba
2	1974	Peterborough, ON	Trent University
1	1973	Banff, AB	University of Calgary
