= Medical model =

Set of procedures in which all doctors are trained

Medical model is the term coined by psychiatrist R. D. Laing in his The Politics of the Family and Other Essays (1971), for the "set of procedures in which all doctors are trained". It includes complaint, history, physical examination, ancillary tests if needed, diagnosis, treatment, and prognosis with and without treatment.

The medical model embodies basic assumptions about medicine that drive research and theorizing about physical or psychological difficulties on a basis of causation and remediation.

It can be contrasted with other models that make different basic assumptions. Examples include holistic model of the alternative health movement and the social model of the disability rights movement, as well as to biopsychosocial and recovery models of mental disorders. For example, Gregory Bateson's double bind theory of schizophrenia focuses on environmental rather than medical causes. These models are not mutually exclusive. A model is not a statement of absolute reality or a belief system but a tool for helping patients. Thus, utility is the main criterion, and the utility of a model depends on context.

== Other uses ==
=== In psychology ===
In psychology, the term medical model refers to the assumption that psychopathology is the result of one's biology, that is to say, a physical/organic problem in brain structures, neurotransmitters, genetics, the endocrine system, etc., as with traumatic brain injury, Alzheimer's disease, or Down's syndrome. The medical model is useful in these situations as a guide for diagnosis, prognosis, and research. However, for most mental disorders, exclusive reliance on the medical model leads to an incomplete understanding, and, frequently, to incomplete or ineffective treatment interventions. The current Diagnostic and Statistical Manual of Mental Disorders (DSM-5), addresses this point in part, stating,

However, in the absence of clear biological markers or clinically useful measurements of severity for many mental disorders, it has not been possible to completely separate normal and pathological symptom expressions contained in diagnostic criteria. This gap in information is particularly problematic in clinical situations in which the patient's symptom presentation by itself (particularly in mild forms) is not inherently pathological and may be encountered in individuals for whom a diagnosis of "mental disorder" would be inappropriate.

The Critical Psychiatry Network, a group of psychiatrists who critique the practice of psychiatry on many grounds, feel that the medical model for mental illness can result in poor treatment choices.

=== Germ theory of disease ===
The rise of modern scientific medicine during the 19th century has a great impact on the development of the medical model. Especially important was the development of the "germ theory" of disease by European medical researchers such as Louis Pasteur and Robert Koch. During the late 19th and early 20th centuries, the physical causes of a variety of diseases were uncovered, which, in turn, led to the development of effective forms of treatment.

== Concept of "disease" and "injury" ==
The concepts of "disease" and "injury" are central to the medical model. In general, "disease" or "injury" refer to some deviation from normal body functioning that has undesirable consequences for the affected individual. An important aspect of the medical model is that it regards signs (objective indicators such as an elevated temperature) and symptoms (subjective feelings of distress expressed by the patient) as indicative of an underlying physical abnormality (pathology) within the individual. According to the medical model, medical treatment, wherever possible, should be directed at the underlying pathology in an attempt to correct the abnormality and cure the disease. In regard to many mental illnesses, for example, the assumption is that the cause of the disorder lies in abnormalities within the affected individual's brain (especially their brain neurochemistry). That carries the implicit conclusion that disordered behaviors are not learned but are spontaneously generated by the disordered brain. According to the medical model, for treatment (such as drugs), to be effective, it should be directed as closely as possible at correcting the theorized chemical imbalance in the brain of the person with mental illness.

=== Importance of diagnosis ===
Proper diagnosis (that is, the categorization of illness signs and symptoms into meaning disease groupings) is essential to the medical model. Placing the patient's signs and symptoms into the correct diagnostic category can:

1. Provide the physician with clinically useful information about the course of the illness over time (its prognosis);
2. Point to (or at least suggest) a specific underlying cause or causes for the disorder; and
3. Direct the physician to specific treatment or treatments for the condition.

For example, if a patient presents to a primary care provider with symptoms of a given illness, by taking a thorough history, performing assessments (such as auscultation and palpation), and, in some cases, ordering diagnostic tests the primary care provider can make a reasonable conclusion about the cause of the symptoms. Based on clinical experience and available evidence, the healthcare professional can identify treatment options that are likely to be successful.

== Other important aspects ==
Finally, adherence to the medical model has a number of other consequences for the patient and society as a whole, both positive and negative:

1. In the medical model, the physician was traditionally seen as the expert, and patients were expected to comply with the advice. The physician assumes an authoritarian position in relation to the patient. Because of the specific expertise of the physician, according to the medical model, it is necessary and to be expected. However, in recent years, the move towards patient-centered care has resulted in greater patient involvement in many cases.
2. In the medical model, the physician may be viewed as the dominant health care professional, who is the professional trained in diagnosis and treatment.
3. An ill patient should not be held responsible for the condition. The patient should not be blamed or stigmatized for the illness.
4. Under the medical model, the disease condition of the patient is of major importance. Social, psychological, and other "external" factors, which may influence patient behavior, may be given less attention.

== See also ==
- Andersen healthcare utilization model
- Biomedical model
- Medical model of disability
- Reductionism
- Social constructionism
