= Canadian Association for Photographic Art =

Organization for camera clubs and individuals in Canada

- Formation: 1998
- Merger of: National Association for Photographic Art (NAPA), Colour Photographic Association of Canada (CPAC)
- Type: Nonprofit charitable organization
- Registration no.: 119051415 RR0001
- Purpose: To promote the art and science of photography throughout Canada and the world
- Headquarters: Salmon Arm, British Columbia
- Products: Canadian Camera magazine
- Website: capacanada.ca
- Formerly called: National Association for Photographic Art

The Canadian Association for Photographic Art (CAPA) is an organization of regional and other camera clubs, as well as individuals, in Canada and around the world. It was established in 1998 as a result of the merger of the National Association of Photographic Arts (NAPA) and the Colour Photographic Association of Canada (CPAC). Its major interest is to serve Canadian photographers. The association aims "to promote the art and science of photography in all its forms throughout Canada and the world". It is headquartered in Salmon Arm, British Columbia.

== History ==
The Colour Photographic Association of Canada (CPAC) was formed in May 1947 in Toronto. CPAC grew to sponsor conventions on colour photography beginning in 1953.

In 1967, the desire to promote all aspects of photography, including black and white imagery, was beyond the scope and interests of CPAC. This led to the formation of the National Association for Photographic Art (NAPA) in December 1967. NAPA sponsored conferences, exhibitions, and competitions.

In 1996, the boards of NAPA and CPAC agreed that a single organization would better serve the needs of Canadian photographers and photographic clubs. The two clubs worked together to merge, and established the Canadian Association for Photographic Art in 1998.

== Canadian Camera ==
NAPA began publishing Camera Canada. It later evolved into Fotoflash Journal, and finally became Canadian Camera, published quarterly.

== Regional organization ==
CAPA is organized into five regional zones:

Atlantic Zone
comprising 4 provinces: New Brunswick, Newfoundland and Labrador, Nova Scotia, and Prince Edward Island.
Quebec Zone
comprising 4 districts: Montreal, Montérégie, Laurentides, and Capitale-Nationale (Chaudière-Appalaches).
Ontario Zone
comprising 10 districts: Southwestern Ontario – Area 1, Southwestern Ontario – Area 2, Niagara Region, Toronto, Belleville – Bancroft, Kingston Region, Northwestern Ontario, Eastern Ontario Region, "The Sault" Region, and Western Ontario Region.
Prairie Zone
comprising 4 provinces: Alberta, Saskatchewan, Manitoba, and the Northwest Territories.
Pacific Zone
comprising British Columbia and Yukon.
