= Mental disorders diagnosed in childhood =

- Specialty: Psychiatry

Mental disorders diagnosed in childhood are a classification of mental illnesses or disorders that negatively impact the emotional, social, and developmental wellbeing of a child. These disorders can be characterized as emotional (mood disorders), behavioral, or neurodevelopmental and frequently persist into adulthood. Children with mental disorders require support from their families and schools, often in the form of an individualized education program (IEP) or other classroom accommodations. Symptoms that arise as a result of childhood mental health disorders are usually first recognized in infancy, childhood, or early adolescence, as laid out in the DSM-5-TR and in the ICD-11.

== Intellectual disability ==
=== DSM-5-TR ===
The diagnostic criteria necessary in order to diagnose intellectual disability (ID) consists of:

A. Deficits in intellectual functions, such as reasoning, problem solving, planning, abstract thinking, and learning from experience. These deficits are confirmed through clinical assessments and individualized standardized tests.
B. Deficits in adaptive functioning that cause failure to perform sociocultural and developmental standards for independence and social responsibility. Without support, these deficits can lead to limited functioning in areas of daily life, such as in communication and independent living.
C. These symptoms must have onset during the developmental period.

Intellectual disability is specified by severity, with the varying severities being mild, moderate, severe, and profound. These severity levels are determined by how well one is able to function intellectually, socially, and independently.

=== Cause ===
Intellectual disability in children can be caused by genetic or environmental factors. The individual could have a natural brain malformation or pre or postnatal damage done to the brain caused by drowning or a traumatic brain injury, for example. Nearly 30 to 50% of individuals with intellectual disability will never know the cause of their diagnosis even after thorough investigation.

Prenatal causes of intellectual disability include:

- Congenital infections such as cytomegalovirus, toxoplasmosis, herpes, syphilis, rubella and human immunodeficiency virus
- Prolonged maternal fever in the first trimester
- Exposure to anticonvulsants or alcohol
- Untreated maternal phenylketonuria (PKU)
- Complications of prematurity, especially in extremely low-birth-weight infants
- Postnatal exposure to lead

Single-gene disorders that result in intellectual disability include:

- Fragile X syndrome
- Neurofibromatosis
- Tuberous sclerosis
- Noonan's syndrome
- Cornelia de Lange's syndrome

These single-gene disorders are usually associated with atypical physical characteristics. About 1/4 of individuals with intellectual disability have a detectable chromosomal abnormality. Others may have small amounts of deletion or duplication of chromosomes, which may go unnoticed and therefore, undetermined.

=== Symptoms ===
As an infant, the individual with intellectual disability might sit up, crawl, or walk later than what is developmentally appropriate. They may have trouble talking or learn to talk late. The infants with intellectual disability will probably have trouble learning to potty train, feeding themselves, remembering things, with problem-solving, and may have recurrent explosive tantrums.

Some symptoms that a child with intellectual disability might show are continued infant-like behavior, a lack of curiosity, the inability to meet educational demands, learning ability that is below average, and the failure to meet developmentally appropriate intellectual goals. Some children with severe intellectual disability may have seizures, mobility problems, vision problem, or hearing problems.

=== Treatment ===
Intellectual disability generally has no cure, but clinical treatments and additional support services can help children gain new skills and improve daily functioning. In the United States, early intervention professionals work with families to develop an Individualized Family Service Plan (IFSP) for eligible infants and toddlers, documenting the child's needs and the services to address them.

Speech therapy, physical therapy, and occupational therapy may be offered according to individual needs. Children with ID can receive special education through the public school system, where school staff and parents develop an Individualized Education Program (IEP). This program outlines the educational services and support the child will receive.

== Learning disorders ==
=== DSM-5 ===
The DSM-5 has the diagnosis of Specific Learning Disorder, which is a disorder where one has difficulties in being able to learn and use academic skills. Specific learning disorder has specifiers for the areas that one faces difficulties in, with those specifiers being impairment in reading, impairment in writing, and impairment in mathematics.

=== Cause ===
Learning disorders are believed to be caused by a nervous system abnormality. The abnormality could either be in the structure of the brain or in the functioning of chemicals in the brain. Because of this, individual has problems receiving, processing or communicating information normally. Some causes of the nervous system abnormality include problems during pregnancy, birth or early infancy, brain trauma at a young age, exposure to toxins, and prematurity.

=== Symptoms ===
Children with a learning disorder may display the following traits:

- Difficulties reading words, such as reading slowly, having difficulty sounding out words, and reading words incorrectly.
- Difficulty understanding what they have read.
- Difficulties with accurately spelling words.
- Difficulties with writing, such as grammatical errors and issues with origination and clarity of writing.
- Difficulties with number sense, number facts, calculations, or mathematical reasoning.

=== Treatment ===
There is no treatment that can cure a learning disorder, but intervention and accommodations can help those with learning disorders cope with the difficulties they may face. Special education programs in schools are able to give children with learning disorders an environment that is more appropriate for them and minimizes the issues they may face in a standard classroom. Individual education programs (IEPs) are also used in order to give children specific accommodations for their personal difficulties.

== Motor disorders ==
=== DSM-5 ===
The motor disorders described in the DSM-5 are Developmental Coordination Disorder and Stereotypic Movement Disorder. Developmental Coordination Disorder is a disorder where one's acquisition and ability to perform motor skills is below the level that is normal for someone their age. These difficulties with motor skills may include clumsiness, slowness, or inability to correctly perform motor tasks. Stereotypic Movement Disorder is characterized by repetitive motions that are seemingly driven and purposeless. These repetitive movements lead to disruptions in daily life, and may possibly be self-injurious.

=== Cause ===
The cause behind motor disorders is not exact, but the cause is usually genetic or environmental. Motor skills disorders are often associated with physiological or developmental abnormalities including ADHD, learning disorders, developmental disabilities and prematurity.

=== Symptoms ===
In infants, some babies may be hypotonia, a loose and floppy baby, or hypertonia, a stiff and rigid baby. Toddlers may have trouble feeding themselves or may stand, sit or walk later than what is developmentally normal. Other signs of motor skills disorders may be children that are clumsy or have excessive accidents, such as knocking things over. Children who have trouble with complex physical activities such as dancing, swimming, catching or throwing a ball, or drawing may avoid these activities completely.

=== Treatment ===
Different therapies are offered to children with motor skills disorders to help them improve their motor effectiveness. Many children work with an occupational and physical therapist, as well as educational professionals. This helpful combination is beneficial to the child. Cognitive therapy, sensory integration therapy, and kinesthetic training are often favorable treatment for the child.

== Communication disorders ==
=== DSM-5 ===
Communication disorders inhibit one's abilities in various areas of communication, such as language, speech, and non-verbal communication. Those with language disorder have deficits in using language, whether it be verbally, written, or signed. These deficits include a limited vocabulary, struggles with sentence structure and forming sentences, and limited ability to be able to describe topics or hold a conversation. Speech sound disorder is a disorder that impairs one's ability to produce sounds correctly and leads to limited speech intelligibility. Childhood-onset fluency disorder, more commonly known as stuttering, disturbs the normal flow and timing of speech. These disturbances may be sound and syllable repetitions, sound prolongations, pauses in the middle of words or speech, excess physical tension when pronouncing words, or the repetitions of one syllable words. Social Communication Disorder is marked by difficulties in being able to communicate appropriately, following rules for conversation (such as taking turns talking), understanding things that are not explicitly said, and understanding non-literal language. All of these disorders disturb one's ability to communicate with others significantly and can interfere with social participation, relationships, or the ability to meet academic and occupational standards.

=== Cause ===
The cause of communication disorders in children are usually biological, developmental or environmental. These causes include abnormalities in brain development, exposure to certain toxins during pregnancy, or genetic factors.

=== Treatment ===
Speech and language therapists are often very reliable for helping children with communication disorders. Remedial techniques are often used to help the child communicate more and work on their existing problems. Another technique is to help push the child to work on their strengths to improve their communication skills.

== Pervasive developmental disorders ==
=== DSM-IV-TR ===
- 299.00 Autistic disorder
- 299.80 Rett's disorder
- 299.10 Childhood disintegrative disorder
- 299.80 Asperger syndrome
- 299.80 Pervasive developmental disorder NOS

=== Cause ===
Pervasive developmental disorders have no known cause yet, but researchers are interested in finding a connection between the disorders and problems in the nervous system. Studies are being done on the brain and spinal cord in children with PDDs to try to find a link.

=== Symptoms ===
Children with pervasive developmental disorders may exhibit the following symptoms:

- Have trouble expressing or understanding ideas
- Have trouble understanding nonverbal communication
- Difficulty in social interactions
- Temper tantrums
- Aggressive behavior
- May play differently with toys than other children
- May have difficulty adjusting to new places or people
- Anxious behavior

=== Treatment ===
A specific treatment plan is usually laid out for the child because of the wide range of behaviors and abilities in each child. Treatment often involves promoting better communication and socializing, and reducing behaviors that can be disruptive. Children with pervasive developmental disorders may be placed in special education classes, receive behavior modification training, speech, physical or occupational therapy, or medication.

== Attention-deficit and disruptive behavior disorders ==
=== DSM-IV-TR ===
- Attention deficit hyperactivity disorder (ADHD)
  - 314.01 Combined subtype: If both Criteria A1 and A2 are met for the past 6 months.
  - 314.01 Predominantly hyperactive-impulsive subtype
  - 314.00 Predominantly inattentive subtype
  - 314.9 Attention-Deficit Hyperactivity Disorder NOS: This category is used for individuals that have pronounced symptoms of inattention or hyperactivity-impulsivity, yet do not meet the criteria for Attention-Deficit/Hyperactivity Disorder. These individuals may include:

1. Individuals who meet the criteria for ADHD, Predominantly Inattentive Type, but their age of onset is later than 7 years old.
2. Individuals who present inattentive symptoms and meet the full criteria for the disorder but also have a behavioral pattern that is defined by having low energy, daydreaming, and laziness.

- Conduct disorder
  - 312.81 Childhood onset: At least one of the Diagnostic Criteria needs to be met for Conduct Disorder before age 10.
  - 312.82 Adolescent onset: The absence of any criteria characteristic of Conduct Disorder before the age of 10.
  - 312.89 Unspecified onset: The age of onset is unknown.
  - 313.81 Oppositional Defiant Disorder
  - 312.9 Disruptive Behavior Disorder NOS: This category includes disorders similar to conduct or oppositional defiant behaviors but do not meet the diagnostic criteria for either disorder, yet the impairment is clinically significant and causes significant impairment in the individual's life.

=== Cause ===
With ADHD being one of the most common disorders diagnosed in childhood, the causes are often studied, yet still inconclusive. Many researchers say ADHD is caused by genetic factors, yet other studies are being done to expand on the cause. One research study showed that children who carry a certain gene associated with ADHD had a thinner layer of tissue in the areas of the brain associated with attention. As the children grew older, the brain tissue thickened and their ADHD symptoms improved. Environmental factors, such as the mother smoking or drinking during pregnancy is connected to children with ADHD. Children exposed to lead at a young age will also have an increased chance of developing ADHD. Brain injuries could cause ADHD, yet only a small number of children diagnosed fit into this category. Researchers have looked into sugar intake as the cause of ADHD, but have found little to support that theory.

=== Symptoms ===
Children with attention deficit and disruptive behavior disorders may show the following symptoms:

- Impulsivity or distractibility
- Difficulty socializing
- Aggressive behavior
- Difficulty following rules or directions or completing a task
- Problems at school
- Frustration
- Alcohol or drug use

=== Treatment ===
Medication is often used to treat children with attention-deficit and disruptive behavior disorders. Individualized programs are available for children with these disorders in order to help them function in and complete school. It is the common belief that many of these disorders will disappear as the children get older, but recent research shows that it can carry on into adulthood.

== Feeding and eating disorders of infancy or early childhood ==
=== DSM-5-TR ===
Eating disorders that may be diagnosed in childhood include Pica, which is the persistent eating of nonfood substances that is severe enough to require clinical attention, and Rumination Disorder, which is the repeated regurgitation of food.

=== Cause ===
There are a number of factors that could potentially contribute to the development of feeding and eating disorders of infancy or early childhood. These factors include:

- Physiological – a chemical imbalance effecting the child's appetite could cause a feeding or eating disorder.
- Developmental – developmental abnormalities in oral-sensory, oral-motor, and swallowing can impact the child's eating ability and elicit a feeding or eating disorder.
- Environmental – simple issues such as inconsistent meal times can cause a feeding or eating disorder. Giving the child food that they are not developmentally acquired for can also cause these disorders. Family dysfunction and sociocultural issues could also play a role in feeding or eating disorders.
- Relational – when the child is not securely attached to the mother, it can cause feeding interactions to become disturbed or unnatural. Other factors, such as parental emotional unavailability and parental eating disorders, can cause feeding and eating disorders in their children.
- Psychological and behavioral – these factors include one involving the child's temperament. Characteristics such as being anxious, impulsive, distracted, or strong-willed personality types are ones that could affect the child's eating and cause a disorder. The individual could have learned to reject food due to a traumatic experience such as choking or being force fed.

=== Symptoms ===
Physical and emotional changes are often the most indicative symptoms of feeding and eating disorders of infancy or early childhood. The child's growth and development may be delayed due to the lack of necessary nutrients. The child will usually weigh much less than other children. Withdrawal and irritability are often associated with children that are malnourished.

=== Treatment ===
Since feeding and eating disorders in children can cause dangerous risks to the child, it is important to seek treatment as soon as possible. Cognitive behavioral therapy can be incredibly beneficial to children with feeding or eating disorders. Family therapy is usually encouraged in order to keep all members involved in nourishing the child.

== Tic disorders ==
=== DSM-IV-TR ===
- 307.23 Tourette's disorder
- 307.22 Chronic motor or vocal tic disorder
- 307.21 Transient tic disorder: Must meet the following criteria in order to be diagnosed:

A. Either one or multiple motor and/or vocal tics, for example, motor or vocal noises that are rapid, repeated, sudden, and nonrhythmic.
B. The tics happen multiple times over the course of the day, almost every day for at least 4 weeks, but do not occur continually for any longer than 1 year.
C. Symptoms are present before the age of 18.
D. The tics are not a result of any effects due to drug use, or any other medical condition, for example, Huntington's disease.
E. The individual does not have symptoms that meet the criteria for Tourette's Disorder or Chronic Motor or Vocal Tic Disorder.

- 307.20 Tic disorder NOS: This category is for disorders characterized by tics but do not meet the diagnostic criteria of the DSM-IV-TR.

=== Cause ===
No definitive cause of tic disorders has been declared, but for the most part, the cause lies within biological, chemical, or environmental factors. Studies have shown that abnormal neurotransmitters, such as dopamine and serotonin, which are active in chemical messages in the brain, can serve as a cause of tic disorders. Researchers have also found abnormal changes in certain parts of the brain that cause strain on the blood flow within the brain, which is likely a contributor of tic disorders. 75% of tic disorders have a genetic component. It appears that tic disorders can be caused or worsened by recreational or prescription drug use. Tics can form simply if a person repeats sounds or words they hear over the course of a normal day.

=== Symptoms ===
Children with a tic disorder may exhibit the following symptoms:

- Overwhelming urge to make movement
- Jerking of arms
- Clenching of fists
- Excessive eye blinking
- Shrugging of shoulders
- Kicking
- Raising eyebrows
- Flaring of nostrils
- Production of repetitive noises such as grunting, clicking, moaning, snorting, squealing, or throat clearing

=== Treatment ===
As part of the treatment, family members and friends are advised not to call attention to the tics when the child is performing them. If they do, the child may develop more tics more frequently. Behavioral therapy and medication are often the choices of treatment for tic disorders in children.

== Elimination disorders ==
=== DSM-IV-TR ===
- 307.6 Enuresis (not due to a general medical condition)
- 307.7 Encopresis, without constipation and overflow incontinence
- 787.6 Encopresis, with constipation and overflow incontinence

=== Cause ===
Encopresis: The most common cause of encopresis is constipation. When a child becomes constipated, feces build up in and stretch the rectum. This stretching causes the nerve endings to become dull. The child may not feel when they need to eliminate the feces or if the waste is coming out. Inside the rectum, the feces could become too large or solid to eliminate without feeling pain. While the mass of feces is stuck in the child's rectum, liquid feces could leak from around the mass and out of the child's body. The main causes of constipation are diet, lack of sufficient amounts of water, stress, not enough exercise, and inconsistent bathroom routines.

Enuresis: The cause of enuresis is thought to be unclear and usually is attributed to many factors.

  - Genetic – there is a genetic component within enuresis and it tends to run in families.
  - Inability to feel that the bladder is full and be aroused from sleep.
  - Insufficient size of bladder – the child's bladder is too small to contain the amount of urine produced.
  - Psychological factors – these are not main factors that contribute to enuresis, but stress may be a cause.
  - Maturational delay – the child's recognition that the bladder is full and they need to go to the bathroom is a developmental issue. Many children with enuresis will develop this skill as they grow older.

=== Symptoms ===
The majority of children with enuresis show no other symptoms besides wetting the bed at night. If other symptoms are present, such as blood stains in their underwear or unusual pain, the child is likely to have a more serious medical problem. Children with encopresis are likely to exhibit symptoms such as; loss of appetite, loose or watery stools, abdominal pain, scratching or itching of anal area because of irritation, withdrawal from friends, or secretive attitude associated with bowel movements.

=== Treatment ===
Children usually "grow out" of their elimination disorders by the time they reach their teens. If treatment is necessary, the most effective choice for enuresis is behavior modification, which involves a special pad that the child sleeps on at night. If the pad gets wet, an alarm goes off and the child is directed to go to the bathroom. Stool softeners or laxatives are the choice of treatment for encopresis.

== Other disorders of infancy, childhood, or adolescence ==
=== DSM-IV-TR ===
- 309.21 Separation anxiety disorder
- 313.23 Selective mutism
- 313.89 Reactive attachment disorder of infancy or early childhood
- 307.3 Stereotypic movement disorder
- 313.9 Disorder of infancy, childhood, or adolescence NOS: This category is a residual category for disorders with onset in infancy, childhood, or adolescence that do not meet criteria for any specific disorder in the classification.

=== Cause ===
There are multiple factors that contribute to the cause of other disorders of infancy, childhood, or adolescence. The majority of the factors are going to be physical or environmental. Some of the disorders could be caused by parental influence, such as their inability to properly take care of their child. Most of the other disorders diagnosed in infancy, childhood, or adolescence involve anxiety. If the child is continually put in anxiety producing situations, they could show symptoms of these disorders. Usually, the symptoms will be mild and the child will not get help, which may cause the symptoms to become worse.

=== Symptoms ===
Separation anxiety disorder

- Excessive stress when separated from home or family
- Fear of being alone
- Refusal to sleep alone
- Clinginess
- Excessive worry about safety and getting lost
- Frequent medical complaints with no cause
- Refusal to go to school

Selective mutism

- Unable to speak in certain social situations, even though they are comfortable speaking at home or with friends
- Difficulty maintaining eye contact
- May have blank facial expressions
- Stiff body movements
- May have a worrisome personality
- May be incredibly sensitive to sound
- Difficulty with verbal and nonverbal expression
- May appear shy, when in reality, they have a fear of people.

Reactive attachment disorder of infancy or early childhood

- Withdrawing from others
- Aggressive attitude towards peers
- Awkwardness or discomfort
- Watching others but not engaging in social interaction

Stereotypic movement disorder

- Head banging
- Nail biting
- Hitting or biting oneself
- Hand waving or shaking
- Rocking back and forth

=== Treatment ===
- Separation anxiety disorder

Cognitive behavioral therapy is often used to treat separation anxiety disorder. Family therapy may also be helpful to get to the core of the issue. Systemic desensitization techniques are usually used to help the child get used to being comfortable away from home.

- Selective mutism

It is important not to "enable" the child with selective mutism by allowing them to remain silent in the social settings that they are uncomfortable in. Both parents and teachers need to be involved in the treatment of selective mutism. The most important factor to remember is that the child does not have a speech disorder; it is an anxiety disorder.

- Reactive attachment disorder of infancy or early childhood

Treatment almost always involves the child and their parents or caregivers parents may need to take parenting skills classes and attend family therapy with the child. Individual therapy with the child and therapist is effective. Another technique is keeping close physical contact between the child and their parents.

- Stereotypic movement disorder

Behavioral techniques and psychotherapy are the most effective treatment for children with this disorder. It is important to change the child's environment so that they are unable to harm themselves. Medication is also effective.

== Behavioural and emotional disorders with onset usually occurring in childhood and adolescence (ICD-10) ==
=== Hyperkinetic disorders ===
- (F90.0) Disturbance of activity and attention
  - Attention-deficit hyperactivity disorder
  - Attention deficit syndrome with hyperactivity
- (F90.1) Hyperkinetic conduct disorder
- (F90.8) Other hyperkinetic disorders
- (F90.9) Hyperkinetic disorder, unspecified

=== Conduct disorders ===
- (F91.0) Conduct disorder confined to the family context
- (F91.1) Unsocialized conduct disorder
- (F91.2) Socialized conduct disorder
- (F91.3) Oppositional defiant disorder
- (F91.8) Other conduct disorders
- (F91.9) Conduct disorder, unspecified

=== Mixed disorders of conduct and emotions ===
- (F92.0) Depressive conduct disorder
- (F92.8) Other mixed disorders of conduct and emotions
- (F92.9) Mixed disorder of conduct and emotions, unspecified

=== Emotional disorders with onset specific to childhood ===
- (F93.0) Separation anxiety disorder of childhood
- (F93.1) Phobic anxiety disorder of childhood
- (F93.2) Social anxiety disorder of childhood
- (F93.3) Sibling rivalry disorder
- (F93.8) Other childhood emotional disorders
  - Identity disorder
  - Overanxious disorder
- (F93.9) Childhood emotional disorder, unspecified

=== Disorders of social functioning with onset specific to childhood and adolescence ===
- (F94.0) Elective mutism
- (F94.1) Reactive attachment disorder of childhood
- (F94.2) Disinhibited attachment disorder of childhood
- (F94.8) Other childhood disorders of social functioning
- (F94.9) Childhood disorder of social functioning, unspecified

=== Tic disorders ===
- (F95.0) Transient tic disorder
- (F95.1) Chronic motor or vocal tic disorder
- (F95.2) Combined vocal and multiple motor tic disorder (de la Tourette)
- (F95.8) Other tic disorders
- (F95.9) Tic disorder, unspecified

=== Other behavioural and emotional disorders with onset usually occurring in childhood and adolescence ===
- (F98.0) Nonorganic enuresis
- (F98.1) Nonorganic encopresis
- (F98.2) Feeding disorder of infancy and childhood
- (F98.3) Pica of infancy and childhood
- (F98.4) Stereotyped movement disorders
- (F98.5) Stuttering (stammering)
- (F98.6) Cluttering
- (F98.8) Other specified behavioural and emotional disorders with onset usually occurring in childhood and adolescence
  - Attention deficit disorder without hyperactivity
  - Excessive masturbation
  - Nail biting
  - Nose picking
  - Thumb sucking
- (F98.9) Unspecified behavioural and emotional disorders with onset usually occurring in childhood and adolescence

== Perception ==
=== Stigma ===
It is not uncommon for children with mental health disorders to be faced with stigma. Stigma against those with mental health disorders can be seen through stereotyping, prejudice, and discrimination. This stigma can come from the public (those without the disorder) and by oneself (those with the disorder). Both public and self-stigma can diminish the self-esteem of those with mental health disorders; especially children.

Typically, children with mental health disorders are first exposed to stigma within their family unit before later being exposed to it in the school setting and the public. While some may view stigma as a minor problem when looking at the other obstacles children with mental illness may face, others view it as a major problem because of the negative impact it can have on a child's treatment and self perception.

Stigma within the family can cause a delay in the diagnosis of mental health disorders, delaying treatment. It can also cause children to be hesitant in seeking treatment, even when they are experiencing clear mental health symptoms. This is especially true for boys who are more likely than girls to avoid seeking out treatment because of the fear of experiencing stigma.

== Controversy and alternatives ==
There are people such as Thomas Szasz and Peter Breggin who say child psychiatry should be made illegal because behaviours are not diseases. They believe psychiatric drugging is a form of child abuse. Psychotropic medication has been used at an increasing rate over a few decades, and while having limited information on the effects on a child's development, they are used as a first choice for treatment. Comparatively, alternatives such as general, complementary, and need-based therapy aren't utilized as much. A brain in development has different needs in order to function how it is intended, and psychiatric medicine can disrupt and alter that development and lead to more issues or complications. Psychiatric medication has a vast quantity of side effects including but not limited to : Drowsiness, fatigue, weight gain, changes in appetite, sleep disturbances, and disinterest in activities. Alternative treatments are more effective person by person and can be incorporated into regular treatments or to slowly wean off of medication.
