= Emotional and behavioral disorders =

Educational term used primarily in the US

Emotional and behavioral disorders (EBD), also known as behavioral and emotional disorders, is a term used primarily in the United States that refers to a disability classification used in educational settings that allows educational institutions to provide special education and related services to students who have displayed poor social and/or academic progress.

The classification is often given to students after conducting a Functional Behavior Analysis. These students need individualized behavior supports such as a Behavior Intervention Plan, to receive a free and appropriate public education. Students with EBD may be eligible for an Individualized Education Plan (IEP) and/or accommodations in the classroom through a 504 Plan.

== History ==
=== Early history ===
Before any studies were done on the subject, mental illnesses were often thought to be a form of demonic possession or witchcraft. Since much was unknown, there was little to no distinction between the different types of mental illness and developmental disorders that we refer to today. Most often, they were dealt with by performing an exorcism on the person exhibiting signs of any mental illness. In the early to mid-1800s, asylums were introduced to America and Europe. There, patients were treated cruelly and often referred to as lunatics by doctors in the professional fields. The main focus of asylums were to shun people with mental illnesses from the public. In 1963, the Community Mental Health Centers Construction Act (Public Law 88–164), was passed by Congress and signed by John F. Kennedy, which provided federal funding to community mental health centers. This legislation changed the way that mental health services were handled and also led to the closure of many large asylums. Many laws soon followed assisting more and more people with EBDs. 1978 came with the passing of Public Law 94- 142 which required free and public education to all disabled children including those with EBDs. An extension of PL 94–142, PL 99-457, was put into act which would provide services to all disabled children from the ages of 3-5 by the 1990–91 school year. PL 94-142 has since been renamed to the Individuals with Disabilities Education Act (IDEA).

=== Use and development of the term ===
Various terms have been used to describe irregular emotional and behavioral disorders. Many of the terms such as mental illness and psychopathology were used to describe adults with such conditions. Mental illness was a label for most people with any type of disorder and it was common for people with emotional and behavioral disorders to be labeled with a mental illness. However, those terms were avoided when describing children as it seemed too stigmatizing. In the late 1900s the term "behaviorally disordered" appeared. Some professionals in the field of special education accepted the term while others felt it ignored emotional issues. In order to make a more uniformed terminology, the National Mental Health and Special Education Coalition, which consists of over thirty professional and advocacy groups, coined the term "emotional and behavioral disorders" in 1988.

== Criteria ==
According to the Individuals with Disabilities Education Act an EBD classification is required if one or more of the following characteristics is excessively observed in a student over a significant amount of time:

- Learning challenges that cannot be explained by intellectual, sensory, or health factors.
- Trouble keeping up or building satisfactory relationships with peers and teachers.
- Inappropriate behavior (against self or others) or emotions (shares the need to harm others or self, low self-worth) in normal conditions.
- An overall attitude of unhappiness or depression.
- A tendency to develop physical symptoms or fears related with individual or school issues.

The term "EBD" includes students diagnosed with schizophrenia. However, it does not have any significant bearing on students who are socially maladjusted unless they also meet the above criteria.

=== Criticisms ===
Providing or failing to provide an EBD classification to a student may be controversial, as the IDEA does not clarify which children would be considered "socially maladjusted". Students with a psychiatric diagnosis of conduct disorder are not guaranteed to receive additional educational services under an EBD classification. Students with an EBD classification who meet the diagnostic criteria for various disruptive behavior disorders, including attention-deficit hyperactivity disorder (ADHD), oppositional defiant disorder (ODD), or conduct disorder (CD) do not have an automatic eligibility to receive an IEP or 504 Plan. Students considered "socially maladjusted", but ineligible for an EBD classification (i.e., students diagnosed with conduct disorder), often receive better educational services in special education classrooms or alternative schools with high structure, clear rules, and consistent consequences.

== Student characteristics ==
Students with EBD are a diverse population with a wide range of intellectual and academic abilities. Males, African-Americans, and economically disadvantaged students are over-represented in the EBD population, and students with EBD are more likely to live in single-parent homes, foster homes, or other non-traditional living situations. These students also tend to have low rates of positive social interactions with peers in educational contexts. Students with EBD are often categorized as "internalizers" (e.g., have poor self-esteem, or are diagnosed with an anxiety disorder or mood disorder) or "externalizers" (e.g., disrupt classroom instruction, or are diagnosed with disruptive behavior disorders such as oppositional defiant disorder and conduct disorder). Male students may be over-represented in the EBD population because they appear to be more likely to exhibit disruptive externalizing behavior that interferes with classroom instruction. Female students may be more likely to exhibit internalizing behavior that does not interfere with classroom instruction, though to what extent this perception is due to social expectations of differences in male and female behavior is unclear. Both internalizing and externalizing behaviour can and do occur in either sex; Students with EBD are also at an increased risk for learning disabilities, school dropout, substance abuse, and juvenile delinquency.

== Internalizing and externalizing behavior ==
A person with EBD with "internalizing" behavior may have poor self-esteem, have depression, experience loss of interest in social, academic, and other life activities, and may exhibit non-suicidal self-injury or substance abuse. Students with internalizing behavior may also have a diagnosis of separation anxiety or another anxiety disorder, post-traumatic stress disorder (PTSD), specific or social phobia, obsessive–compulsive disorder (OCD), panic disorder, and/or an eating disorder. Teachers are more likely to write referrals for students that are overly disruptive. Screening tools used to detect students with high levels of "internalizing" behavior are not sensitive and are rarely used in practice. Students with EBD with "externalizing" behavior may be aggressive, non-compliant, extroverted, or disruptive.

Students with EBD that show externalizing behavior are often diagnosed with attention deficit hyperactivity disorder (ADHD), oppositional defiant disorder (ODD), conduct disorder, autism spectrum disorder and/or bipolar disorder; however, this population can also include typically developing children that have learned to exhibit externalizing behavior for various reasons (e.g., escape from academic demands or access to attention). These students often have difficulty inhibiting emotional responses resulting from anger, frustration, and disappointment. Students who "externalize" exhibit behaviors such as insulting, provoking, threatening, bullying, cursing, and fighting, along with other forms of aggression. Male students with EBD exhibit externalizing behavior more often than their female counterparts.

Children and adolescents with ADD or ADHD may display different types of externalizing behavior and should be either medicated or going through behavioral treatment for their diagnosis. Adolescents with severe ADHD would likely benefit most from both medication and behavioral treatment. Younger children should go through behavioral treatment before being treated with medication. Another recommended form of treatment for children and adolescents diagnosed with ADHD would be counseling from a mental health professional. Treatment options will improve performance of children and adolescents on emotion recognition tasks, specifically response time as there is no difficulty recognizing human emotions. The degree of required treatments vary depending on the degree of ADD or ADHD the individual has.

Treatment for these types of behaviors should include the parents as it is evident that their parenting skills impact on how their child deals with their symptoms, especially when at a younger age. Parents going through a parenting skills training program were reported a decrease in internalizing and externalizing behavior in their children post-training program. The program included learning how to give positive attention, increase good behavior with small frequent rewards and specific praise as well as learning how to decrease attention when the child behaved poorly.

== Effect in cognition ==
In recent years, many researchers have been interested in exploring the relationship between emotional disorders and cognition. Evidence has revealed that there is a relationship between the two. Strauman (1989) investigated how emotional disorders shape a person's cognitive structure, that is, the mental processes people utilize to make sense of the world around them. He recruited three groups of individuals: those with social phobias, those with depression, and controls with no emotional disorder diagnosis. He wanted to determine whether these groups had a cognitive structure showing an actual/ideal (AI) discrepancy (referring to an individual not believing that they have achieved their personal desires) or actual/own/other (AOO) discrepancy (referring to an individual's actions not living up to what their significant other believes that they need to be). He found that depressed individuals had the highest AI discrepancy and social phobics had the greatest AOO discrepancy, while the controls were lower or in between the two for both discrepancies.

Specific cognitive processes (e.g., attention) may be different in those with emotional disorders. MacLeod, Mathews, and Tata (1986) tested the reaction times of 32 participants, some of whom were diagnosed with Generalized Anxiety disorder, when presented with threatening words. They found that when threatening words were presented, people with greater anxiety tended to have increased selective attention, meaning that they reacted quicker to a stimulus in an area where a threatening word was just presented (32-59ms faster). When in the control group, subjects reacted slower when there was a threatening word proceeding the stimulus (16-32ms slower).

Emotional disorders can also alter the way people regulate their emotions. Joormann and Gotlib (2010) conducted a study with depressed, or previously depressed, individuals to test this. They found that, when compared to individuals who have never had a depressive episode, previously and currently depressed individuals tended to use maladaptive emotion regulation strategies (such as rumination or brooding) more. They also found that when depressed individuals displayed cognitive inhibition (slowing of response to a variable that had been previously ignored) when asked to describe a negative word (ignored variable was a positive word), they were less likely to ruminate or brood. When they displayed cognitive inhibition when asked to describe a positive word (ignored variable was a negative word), they were more likely to reflect.
