= Patrick de Maré =

British psychotherapist

Patrick Baltzar de Maré (also De Mare, de Mare, /də ˈmɛər/)(27 January 1916 – 17 February 2008) was a British psychiatrist and consultant psychotherapist with a special interest in group psychotherapy.

After qualifying in 1941, de Mare enlisted, in 1942, in the Royal Army Medical Corps and trained in Army psychiatry. He ran an Exhaustion Centre during the Second World War. Near the end of war, he returned to Northfield Hospital, where he carried out a series of experiments with Sigmund Foulkes and Tom Main on dealing with war trauma. After the war, de Maré became a consultant psychotherapist and expanded his practice into large group therapy. In 1972, he published Perspectives in Group Psychotherapy and, in 1974, and he published Introduction to Group Treatment in Psychiatry with Lionel Kreeger. De Maré died from pneumonia in 2008 at the age of 92.

== Early life and education ==
Maré was born in London, the third son of Bror Eric August de Maré, a timber broker of Swedish origin, and his wife Ellen Ingrid (née Tellander). His elder brother was the photographer and writer Eric de Maré. He was educated at St Cyprian's School, Wellington College, and Peterhouse, Cambridge. He trained for a medical career at St George's Hospital and qualified as a doctor in 1941. He enlisted in the Royal Army Medical Corps in 1942, and was trained for Army psychiatry by Rickman and Wilfred Bion at Northfield Hospital.

== Career ==
It was an interesting time to work as a psychiatrist: the First World War had seen ground-breaking work in diagnosing and treating trauma, and with battle casualties arriving home, Patrick de Maré had plenty of patients to look after and study. He ran an Exhaustion Centre throughout the European campaign, at the end of which he returned to Northfield Hospital, where he joined S. H. Foulkes and Tom Main in the Northfield experiment. Northfield became the centre of a series of experiments led by these eminent physicians, which studied how to deal with trauma caused by war.

After the Second World War, Maré became a Consultant Psychotherapist at St George's Hospital. In 1952, he set up the Group Analytic Society with Foulkes, and later he participated in setting up the Institute of Group Analysis and the Group Analytic Practice. He also worked with Benaim and Lionel Kreeger at Halliwick Hospital, the short-lived therapeutic community.

Maré devoted his skills to the practice of group psychotherapy, starting in the traditional small group psychotherapeutic setting, but progressing towards the experience and application of large groups, and later still developing his main interest of the median group.

In 1960, Wilfred Foulkes and Patrick de Maré established a private clinic, the Group-Analytic Practice. From this work sprung the Group Analytic Society and then, in 1971, the Institute of Group Analysis.

In 1972, he published Perspectives in Group Psychotherapy and in 1974 Lionel Kreeger and he published Introduction to Group Treatment in Psychiatry, which was dedicated to the patients and staff at Halliwick Hospital.

In 1975, he started a large group under the auspices of the Institute of Group Analysis; in 1976 he was joined by Robin Piper. That 'large' group settled down to a steady membership of about twenty members and became a 'median' group. In 1984 he launched a weekly seminar on large groups that, in 1986, became part of a recognised large group section of the Group Analytic Society. He worked for many years at the Group Analytic Practice in London.

== Influence ==
David Bohm underwent psychotherapy with Maré and was heavily influenced by his work.

== Personal life and death ==
Patrick de Maré was an accomplished player of the accordion, banjo and ukulele. He would play his accordion at bars and cafés in Hampstead. He also had a love of opera, and would play music at his practice in Baker Street.

After a long and debilitating illness resulting from a street accident he eventually died from pneumonia at the age of 92, survived by his wife, two daughters, and numerous grandchildren and great-grandchildren.

== Publications ==
- Perspectives in Group Psychotherapy, Allen & Unwin 1972
- Introduction to Group Treatment in Psychiatry, Butterworth 1974 — with Lionel Kreeger
- La historia del grupo grande y sus fenómenos en relación a la psicoterapia de grupo analítica / The History of Large Group phenomena in relation to group analytic psychotherapy, Spanish and English. Two columns side by side. Grup d'Anàlis Barcelona, 1988, 40 pgs & Bibliogr.
- Koinonia: From Hate through Dialogue to Culture in the Larger Group, Karnac Books 1991
- '"A Case for Mind", Group Analysis, Vol 37; NUMB 3, September 2003 — with Roberto Schollberger
