= Gabrielle Rifkind =

British mediator (born 1953)

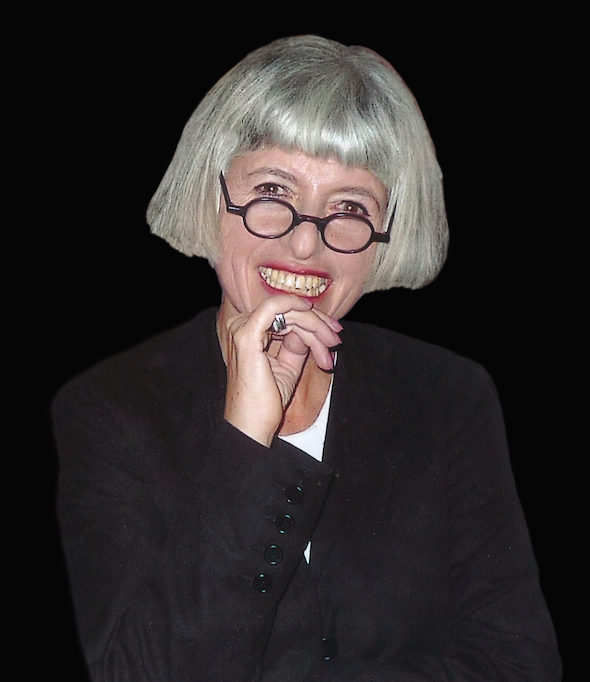
- Gabrielle Rifkind
- Born: 1953 (age 72–73)
- Education: University of Manchester; University of Edinburgh; University of London
- Occupations: Mediator, group analyst, psychotherapist
- Known for: Collaboration, conflict resolution

Gabrielle Rifkind is a British mediator who has specialised in international conflict resolution working through non-governmental organisations, (NGOs) in the Middle East and United Kingdom. She is the Director of Oxford Process. She is known as a commentator on international peacemaking and related themes and author of several titles. Her work considers the role of human relationships in managing parties with "radical disagreements" with the goal of establishing areas of potential mutual self-interest.

== Early life ==
Rifkind is a graduate of the University of Manchester and the University of Edinburgh. After working for the Probation Service, she trained at the Institute of Group Analysis and became a group analyst and a psychotherapist.

== Later career ==
Rifkind joined the Oxford Research Group in the late 1990s to explore peacemaking in the Israeli–Palestinian conflict. She became head of the Israel/Palestine programme. She next turned her attention to Iran and the wider Middle East.

In 2016 she founded Oxford Process, which works in conflict situations to build relationships with conflicted parties to identify opportunities to reduce tensions or prevent further escalation of violence. Rifkind's theory of conflict resolution focuses on the non-violent management of radical differences between groups, rather than searching for an elusive common ground. Her work is currently focused on the Middle East and the war between Russia and Ukraine.

Rifkind has frequently appeared on broadcast media in the UK has given public lectures on peacemaking and contributed to a colloquium at Princeton University. She has twice debated at the Oxford Union. She has been one of the conflict mediators for four series of BBC Radio 4's Across the Red Line, presented by British political journalist Anne McElvoy. Rifkind was a featured speaker at the TED2024 conference in Vancouver.

She is the co-author, with peace activist Scilla Elworthy of Making Terrorism History (2005) and, with former senior UN diplomat Giandomenico Picco, of The Fog of Peace: The Human Face of Conflict Resolution, and author of The Psychology of Political Extremism: What would Sigmund Freud have thought about Islamic State.

== Publications ==
=== Books ===
- Co-author with Tessa Dalley and Kim Terry. Three Voices of Art Therapy: Image, Client, Therapist. United Kingdom: Routledge, 1993 and 2014. ISBN 9780415077965
- Co-author with Scilla Elworthy. Hearts and Minds: Human Security Approaches to Political Violence. United Kingdom: Demos, 2005. ISBN 9781841801483
- Co-author with Scilla Elworthy. Making Terrorism History. London: Penguin/Random House, 2006. ISBN 9781846040474
- Co-Author with Giandomenico Picco. The Fog of Peace: How to Prevent War, Bloomsbury/I.B. Tauris, 2017. ISBN 9781780768977
- The Psychology of Political Extremism: What would Sigmund Freud have thought about Islamic State, 2018. ISBN 9-781-78220-663-7
- Contributor, "When Empathy Fails: Managing Radical Differences" in Encounters: The Art of Interfaith Dialogue 2018.

=== Articles ===
Her contributions to journals include:

- Rifkind, Gabrielle (1 June 1995). "Containing the Containers: The Staff Consultation Group". Group Analysis. 28 (2): 209–222. doi:10.1177/0533316495282010. S2CID 144883427.
- Rifkind, Gabrielle (1 September 1995). "The Creative Process of the Artist and Group Analyst". Group Analysis. 28 (3): 331–337. doi:10.1177/0533316495283009. S2CID 143697955.
- "Language of war, language of peace and its application to the Palestinian/Israeli conflict". Psychotherapy and Politics International. 2 (2). June 2004.
- "Separating aspirations from realities". The Jerusalem Post. 1 May 2006.
- Rifkind, Gabrielle (13 February 2007). "Want to ease tensions with Iran? Just try talking". The Independent.
- "From crisis to opportunity". The Jerusalem Post. 20 February 2007.
- Rifkind, Gabrielle (28 October 2007). "This dialogue of the deaf is making war more likely". The Independent.
- Rifkind, Gabrielle (25 January 2009). "The man to sell peace to the Middle East". The Independent.
- "A route to resolution for Syria and Israel | Gabrielle Rifkind". The Guardian. 26 February 2010.
- Rifkind, Gabrielle (28 September 2010). "Solving the West Bank settler problem". The Guardian.
- "Iran nuclear talks: signs of cautious optimism emerge | Gabrielle Rifkind". The Guardian. 22 May 2012.
- Picco, Giandomenico; Rifkind, Gabrielle (2013). "To help Syria, talk first to Iran and Saudi Arabia". The Guardian.
- "A New Levant: a possible way through in the Syrian crisis". openDemocracy.
- Rifkind, Gabrielle (7 September 2013). "One signature by Assad could help to avert the bombing". The Times.
- "Chilcot tells us what we already knew – how do we implement?". openDemocracy. 6 July 2016.
- "Chilcot: all peaceful options were not exhausted". openDemocracy. 15 July 2016.
- Let's try to understand North Korea's actions: it sees the world as its enemy, The Guardian, July 2017.
- Gaza regeneration: we all need dreams for the future, OpenDemocracy, June 2018.
- National Dialogue: Post-Brexit, We Need a UK-Wide Coming Together, OpenDemocracy, January 2019.
- Rifkind, Gabrielle (15 February 2019). "Afghanistan's fragile future shows the paradoxical nature of peacebuilding". Prospect.
- "Preparing the Psychological Space for Peacemaking", with Nita Yawanarajah, The New England Journal of Public Policy, May 2019.
- "Ancient Hospitality", with John Harris, New Humanist, July 2019.
- Rifkind, Gabrielle (3 December 2019). "We need a path towards reconciliation for Labour and British Jews". The Times.
- "The Deal of the century: any chance of an honest broker?", Open Democracy, March 2020.
- Rifkind, Gabrielle (9 February 2022). "I'm a conflict mediator. This is a way out of the Ukraine crisis". The Guardian.
- Rifkind, Gabrielle (26 January 2023). "How to talk peace while waging war". Prospect.
- Rifkind, Gabrielle (25 November 2023). "A better future can be built for Gaza". Prospect.
- Rifkind, Gabrielle (11 January 2024). "Israelis and Palestinians by Jonathan Glover review – the psychology of conflict". The Guardian.

== Broadcast appearances ==
- BBC Radio 4: The Middle East Conundrum, July 2018.
- BBC Radio 4: Across the Red Line (series 1–4), 2018 and 2019
- BBC Radio 3: Being Diplomatic, April 2019.
