= Minnie Abercrombie =

British zoologist, educationalist and psychologist

Minnie Louie (Jane) Abercrombie
- Born: Minnie Johnson; 14 November 1909; Birmingham, UK
- Died: 25 November 1984 (aged 75)
- Other names: M. L. Johnson; M. L. J. Abercrombie; Jane Abercrombie
- Education: University of Birmingham
- Known for: Dictionary of Biology; New Biology (1945 - 1976); The Anatomy of Judgement (1960)
- Spouse: Michael Abercrombie
- Scientific career
- Fields: Psychology; Zoology
- Workplaces: University of Birmingham, UK; University College London, UK
- Thesis: Topic: chemical control of respiratory movements in invertebrates (1932)

Minnie Abercrombie (14 November 1909 – 25 November 1984), also known as M. L. J. Abercrombie, was a British zoologist, educationalist and psychologist. She was known for her work on invertebrates and her work in the publishing industry, conducted with her husband, Michael Abercrombie. She also contributed to the theory and practice of education through her teaching, research, lecturing and writing. In particular, she carried out pioneer psychological research into the use of groups in learning with medical, architectural and education students, and she shared with diverse audiences in many countries her extensive knowledge and expertise as a teacher who used the methods and principles of group analytic psychotherapy.

== Early life and education ==
Minnie Louie Johnson was born on 14 November 1909. She attended Waverley Road Secondary School in Birmingham, where she completed the higher school certificate in chemistry, zoology, botany, and history. Influenced by her biology teacher she stayed in education and went to university. She was awarded her B.Sc. (Zoology, First Class) and Ph.D from the University of Birmingham in 1930 and 1932, respectively, for studying respiration control in invertebrates.

== Career ==
In 1932, she was appointed as a lecturer in the Zoology Department at University of Birmingham, and during World War II was promoted to acting head. She married Michael Abercrombie 17 July 1939 and collaborated with him extensively on both scientific and outreach work. In 1947 she moved with her husband to University College, London. Among her work to popularise science was the New Biology journal aimed at young people published by Penguin Books from 1945 until 1960. It was highly popular, selling hundreds of thousands of copies. It was co-edited by Abercrombie, using her name M. L. Johnson, and she also wrote some of the earlier articles. She also collaborated with Michael Abercrombie and C. J. Hickman on the Penguin Dictionary of Biology.

She worked on the selection and pre-clinical training of medical students, based in the Anatomy Department. This prompted her interest in group discussion, perception and reasoning so students learned from their peers as well as teachers, a precursor to problem-based learning later adopted in medical education. She also spent 5 years working at Guy's Hospital on a project about cerebral palsy. Abercrombie then was appointed as Reader in Architectural Education at the Bartlett School in University College and able to take full control of her research and teaching.

After her formal retirement, she continued to work and research on small-group education, first with a grant-funded research project about medical education in the Radiology Department at Addenbrooke's Hospital in Cambridge where she was then living, followed by a project at the Cambridge Institute of Education with a group of primary school headteachers and Cambridge Group Work, a regional branch of the Institute of Group Analysis based in London. She was also involved with the University of the Third Age. As a consequence, she was considered an authority on medical education and continuing education of school teachers. She published several books. She was among the founders of the Group Analytic Society and its president from 1980 - 1983.

Abercrombie was a visiting professor at universities in Australia and at McMaster University, Ontario in Canada because of her expertise with small groups.

== Research into education methods ==
Abercrombie investigated and developed improved methods of small-group teaching in higher education. Examples were why medical students, who were able to solve problems when presented in a familiar format, were unable to do so when the same problems were presented in a slightly different way. She brought out that most people rarely reflect upon their initial judgements, which were embedded in their own personality. Abercrombie found that group discussion helped these students solve such problems and, in particular, improved the ability of the students to discriminate between facts and opinions, to resist false conclusions and to bring fresh strategies to their attempts to solve new problems without being adversely influenced by past failure. The ideas she put forward about the development of small group interactive learning pedagogies in the 1960s in the UK had an almost immediate impact on the primary and tertiary education. Her Anatomy of Judgement: an investigation into the process of perception and reasoning resulted from ten years of research on the selection and training of medical students at University College London. This research suggested that the art of medical judgement, diagnosis and other key elements of medical practice, were better learned in small groups of students arriving at a diagnosis collaboratively than by students working individually. Her finding was that group discussion, properly directed, could do much to eliminate faults in the teacher and to make the student think instead of learning. Concepts of problem-based learning used in many medical schools in the late twentieth and twenty-first centuries are based on these ideas.

There was a clear line of development in her work that was always underpinned by her interest in educational work. She progressively developed her research and thinking from her early years as a zoology teacher through her growing involvement in Group Analysis and its application in education. Throughout her work, three themes – the selective and projective nature of perception and reasoning; the difficulty that human beings experience in changing; the subtlety and complexity of communication – continually interact with and enrich one another. She increasingly concentrated on group analysis and its relevance to and use in higher education involving "free" or "associative" group discussion as she used it in her own work with students.

The book The Anatomy of Judgement is an edited selection from her educational writings and is her best known book. It is essentially an analysis of the process of learning as a summation of judgements when information is presented, showing how emotion and preconceptions influence this judgement. The extracts are arranged in four parts. The first gives an overview of the development of her research and thinking from her early years as a zoology teacher to her growing involvement in group analysis and its application in education. The second part illustrates the way in which, throughout her work, three themes interact: the selective and projective nature of perception and reasoning; the difficulty that human beings experience in changing; the subtlety and complexity of communication. The third part focuses in greater detail upon group analysis, its relevance to and use in higher education.

== Group learning ==
She carried out pioneer research into the use of groups in learning with medical, architectural and education students, and she shared with diverse audiences in many countries her extensive knowledge and expertise as a teacher who used the methods and principles of group analytic psychotherapy. Abercrombie came to these views through her contact with the psychoanalyst and group analyst S. H. Foulkes and in 1952 she was a founder member of the Group Analytic Society, and president of the society in 1981. This society still awards a prize in her name, the Jane Abercrombie Prize, in recognition of the importance of her ideas.

…what is being perceived depends not only on what is being looked at but on the state of the perceiver. (Abercrombie, 1960:27)

We tend to think of ourselves as passively receiving information from the outside world, but this is far from the case; in the process of receiving information we interpret and judge, (ibid.: 29)

Free group discussion is to thinking (ideas and abstractions) as handling things is to perception. (Abercrombie, 1960)

Our methods of formal education are still governed by a notion that children's little heads are empty, or at least emptier than they should be, whereas the truth is that it is because they are too full of what we do not understand that they are difficult to teach. (Abercrombie, 1960)

When the thing we look at is sufficiently like the thing we expect to see, and easily fits our scheme, our experience helps us to see. It is only when what we expect to see is not there that our schemata lead us astray, (ibid.: 33)

How to tell students what to look for without telling them what to see is the dilemma of teaching. (Abercrombie, 1960)

We never come to an act of perception with an entirely blank mind, but are always in a state of preparedness or expectancy, because of our past experience, (ibid.: 63)

== Later life ==
When her husband got a job at University of Cambridge, she moved with him to live in Cambridge but commuted to continue to work in London. They had one son, Nicholas. She died suddenly on 25 November 1984.

== Selected publications ==
- Johnson, ML and RJ Whitney (1939) Colorimetric method for estimation of dissolved oxygen in the field. J. Experimental Biology 16 (1) 56 - 59.
- Johnson, ML (1942) The respiratory function of the haemoglobin of the earthworm. J. Experimental Biology 18 (3) 266 - 277.
- Abercrombie, M. L. (1960) The Anatomy of Judgement: An Investigation into the Processes of Perception and Reasoning, London: Hutchinson. Reprinted 1989, Free Association Books.
- Abercrombie, M. L. (1970) Aims and Techniques of Group Teaching, Society for Research into Higher Education (SRHE working party on teaching methods, Publication 2), University of Surrey, Guildford.
- Abercrombie, M. L. (1979). Uses and Abuses of Boundaries – Perception: The Structure of Space and the Group Process. Group Analysis, 12(1), 30.
- Abercrombie, M. L. J. (1981) Beyond d Hawkins|D. Hawkins]] and M.L.J. Abercrombie (1982) Roads to Radiology: An Imaging Guide to Medicine and Surgery. Berlin Heidelberg; Springer-Verlag. ISBN 978-3-540-11801-5 146ppthe Unconscious: Group Analysis Applied (5th Foulkes Lecture). Group Analysis, 14(2), suppt.
