= James Anthony (psychoanalyst) =

British psychoanalyst and psychiatrist (1916–2014)

Elwyn James Anthony
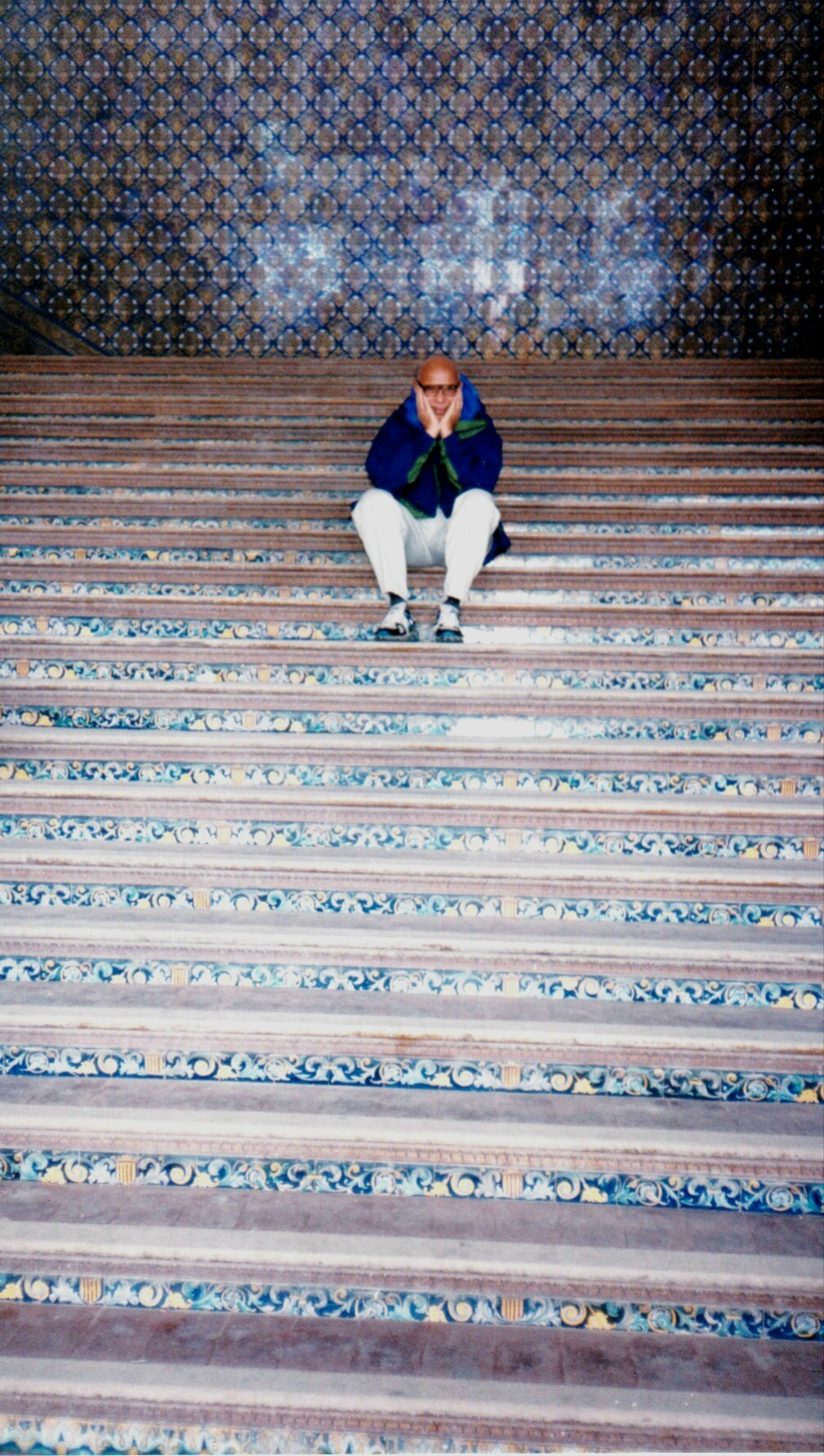
- Born: 21 January 1916; Calcutta, British India
- Died: December 10, 2014 (aged 98)
- Occupations: Psychoanalyst, psychiatrist
- Known for: Research on psychological resilience and childhood risk factors
- Board member of: American Academy of Child and Adolescent Psychiatry
- Spouse(s): Ethel Frances (d. 1983); Virginia Quinn
- Children: 4

Academic background
- Education: King's College London

Academic work
- Institutions: London School of Economics; Maudsley Hospital; Washington University in St. Louis

Elwyn James Anthony (21 January 1916 – 10 December 2014) was a British psychoanalyst and psychiatrist known for his pioneering research on psychological resilience and vulnerability in children, especially those whose parents suffer from mental illness. His work contributed significantly to the understanding of how environmental, familial, and individual factors influence child development in the context of risk.

Anthony held academic and clinical positions in both the United Kingdom and the United States of America. He worked at the Maudsley Hospital in London and later at Washington University in St. Louis, where he played a central role in advancing child psychiatry and developmental psychology. He also served on the board of the American Academy of Child and Adolescent Psychiatry.

== Early life and education ==
Anthony was born in Calcutta, India. He was educated by Jesuits in Darjeeling, India, from the age of four, before immigrating to England for medical training. Early in his career, Jean Piaget, Anna Freud, Erik Erikson, John Bowlby, and Sir Aubrey Lewis collaborated with him, exposing him to international and cultural aspects of child development. Anthony attended medical school at King's College London during the Second World War and delivered babies during the bombings in London.

== Military service ==
Anthony's first assignment as an officer was at Northfield Military Hospital with S. H. Foulkes, treating shell-shocked soldiers, where they initiated rudimentary group psychotherapy. Later, he was transferred to Hong Kong as chief medical officer for Southeast Asia, where he was charged with setting up day-care centers for Japanese children who survived the atomic bombings of Hiroshima and Nagasaki.

== Postwar training and early career ==
When Anthony returned home from the war, he continued his psychiatric and child psychiatric training at the Maudsley Hospital and received the Gold Medal award from the University of London. He was later a member of the Royal College of Psychiatrists. His multiple lectureships included a standing appointment at the London School of Economics.

Anthony studied in London, beginning his career as a psychotherapist and psychiatrist. He studied child development under Jean Piaget and, after leaving the Maudsley Hospital, occupied the Ittleson Chair of Child Psychiatry at Washington University School of Medicine in St. Louis. He later became director of psychotherapy at Chestnut Lodge, where he developed a group psychotherapy program for adolescent inpatients. Anthony and S. H. Foulkes are credited as founders in the field of group psychotherapy.

He authored 320 research articles and 18 books, many of which were translated into multiple languages.

== Professional leadership ==
Anthony served as president of the American Academy of Child and Adolescent Psychiatry, the International Association for Child and Adolescent Psychiatry and Allied Professions, the Association for Child Analysis, and the World Association of Infant Psychiatry. During his presidency of the International Association of Child and Adolescent Psychiatry and Allied Professions, Anthony organized study groups comprising colleagues from diverse cultural backgrounds to explore child development and childhood disorders. As president of AACAP, he facilitated international collaboration, including a joint meeting in Mexico, and led two large groups to China as it opened to the West. As a result of this trip, the USSR sent eight of its researchers to participate in the AACAP’s annual meeting. Anthony also formed a study group to mentor and support young researchers. He was responsible for the first presidential interview at the AACAP Annual Meeting when he interviewed Joan and Erik Erikson. His appointment to the Work Group on Consumer Issues led to the development of AACAP’s Facts for Families, which have been translated into multiple languages. Also, during Anthony's AACAP presidency, an offer was made to purchase the organization's current headquarters.

== Research and academic positions ==
Anthony was recruited from England to hold the Blanche F. Littleton Professorship at Washington University in St. Louis in 1958, making this the first endowed chair in child psychiatry. This was where he conducted most of his longitudinal research. His work at the Edison Child Study Center in St. Louis received funding from numerous grants from foundations and the NIMH. His collaboration with S. H. Foulkes, who became his training analyst, began at Northfield Military Hospital. Furthermore, in the 1950s Anthony became a member of the Group Analytic Society, which was founded by S.H. Foulkes in 1952.

He was a senior lecturer at the Hampstead Clinic and received a Nuffield Fellowship to study with Jean Piaget, whilst collaborating with Foulkes on the topic of Groups, leading to their co-authorship of "Group Psychotherapy: the Psychoanalytic Approach".

== Private practice and memberships ==
Anthony maintained a private practice until the age of 90 and was a member of the British, St. Louis, Chicago, and Washington DC Psychoanalytic Societies.

== Personal life ==
Anthony's first wife, Ethel Frances, died in 1983. They had four children, eleven grandchildren, and ten great-grandchildren. Later, he married Virginia Quinn Anthony, former executive director of AACAP, and lived with her for 30 years until his death on December 10, 2014, aged 98.

== See also ==
- Psychological resilience
- Child development
- Psychoanalysis
