= Group Analytic Society =

UK-based scientific learned society

The Group Analytic Society International was founded in London in 1952 by S. H. Foulkes, Minnie (Jane) Abercrombie and Norbert Elias as a learned society to study and promote the development of Group Analysis in both its clinical and applied aspects. The first regular weekly seminars were given by Foulkes in 1952. Members of the Society come from different countries and from many fields and disciplines, including psychology, sociology, medicine, nursing, social work, counselling, education, industry, architecture, anthropology and theology.

The following individuals were Founder Members: Dr. James Anthony, Dr Patrick De Mare, the Hon. W. H. R. Iliffe and S. H. Foulkes. They were joined from the beginning by Minnie Abercrombie, Dr Norbert Elias and Miss E. T. Marx. The Society, which has charitable status, is a learned society and a non-profit organization. It holds regular scientific meetings and organizes various workshops, including an annual one in January. A triennial European symposium is held at various European locations. An annual S. H. Foulkes lecture for a wider public has been held in London since 1977; the lectures are published in the journal Group Analysis.

== Background ==
After the Second World War, and after the experiments in treating soldiers by group methods at Northfield Hospital near Birmingham, a circle of colleagues interested in furthering their understanding of groups and how to apply group psychotherapy met regularly with Foulkes.

"The small group of friends and interested people who met every week at my house...was in fact the forerunner of the Group Analytic Society. The same group, reinforced by distinguished international visitors, S. R. Slavson being one of them, also functioned as one of the official groups at the International Congress of Mental Health held in London in 1948 when the World Federation of Mental Health was founded."

— Foulkes S. H., 1964, Therapeutic Group Analysis, Allen & Unwin

In 1971, leading members of the Society set up the Institute of Group Analysis, which became responsible for training, including an intensive qualifying course that leads to membership of the institute. Training activities now take place at various British centres as well as on the Continent of Europe, with strong informal links with the London Institute.

The Society publishes a journal, Group Analysis, published by SAGE. Foulkes was the first editor, and he continued to devote much energy to it until 1975, when he handed over the editorial role to Patrick de Maré. Under Foulkes and de Maré it remained a very informal publication, with a large correspondence section. It has since developed into a more formal academic publication.

A newsletter, Group Analytic Contexts, is directly descended from "Group Analysis International Panel and Correspondence" (GAIPAC) that was first edited by Foulkes in 1967 in order to establish dialogue between a wide international network. It then became the Bulletin of the Group Analytic Society and was edited by Elizabeth Foulkes, the widow of S. H. Foulkes, after his death. She passed on the editorship to Ronald A. Sandison in 1988. In 1993 Anne Harrow and Sheila Thomson took over the editorship of the society newsletter, now called Group Analytic Contexts. The newsletter provides a forum for shorter and more informal communications between Group Analytic Society members from across the world and is increasingly integrated with the closed e-mail Forum for Society members. Contexts reports on the activities of GAS and the work and opinions of members.

The Society works through a number of sub-committees and provides:

- The Journal: Group Analysis, containing papers, book reviews and international correspondence.
- The International Newsletter: Group Analytic Contexts, with news, theoretical and clinical articles, reports and correspondence. Past issues are available for download from the link given below.
- An International Directory of Members: with a contact person for each country.
- A List of Members’ Publications Worldwide
- Library Facilities
- Scientific Meetings: held in London.
- The Annual Winter Workshop and Summer Workshop: a four- to five-day international event.
- The Annual S.H. Foulkes Lecture
- Spring Weekend Meeting – Study Day
- International Activities: a symposium and workshop every three years.
- Affiliation to EGATIN, to the European Association for Transcultural Group Analysis, to the International Association of Group Psychotherapy and to the American Group Psychotherapy Association.
- A variety of workshops
