= Beyond Terror =

2007 book by Abbott, Rogers, and Sloboda

- Author: Chris Abbott, Paul Rogers, John Sloboda
- Publisher: Random House
- Publication date: April 2007
- Media type: Paperback
- Pages: 120

Beyond Terror: The Truth About the Real Threats to Our World is a book by Chris Abbott, Paul Rogers and John Sloboda of Oxford Research Group, a UK-based think tank. It is a 120-page paperback published by the Rider imprint of Random House in April 2007.
