= Marjorie Franklin (psychoanalyst) =

British psychiatrist (1887–1975)

Marjorie Ellen Franklin (17 December 1887 – 1975) was a British psychiatrist and psychoanalyst. After she studied medicine, Franklin specialized in psychiatry under Adolf Meyer. Like other British psychoanalysts, she was a client of Sandor Ferenczi and was analysed by him for a period of two years. He advocated for her acceptance as a member of the British Psychoanalytical Society. Ernest Jones, the president of the society, disliked Franklin but he was urged by Ferenczi to be collegial. In the end, Franklin became a full member in 1931, after having been an associate member for a few years. In the same year, Franklin co-founded the Institute for the Scientific Study and Treatment of Delinquency (now called the Centre for Crime and Justice Studies). The aim of the institute was to promote the use of science in dealing with criminal behaviour. Throughout her life, Franklin worked at various health institutions and as a private psychoanalyst.

== Planned environment therapy ==
Franklin's main interest was the relationship between a patient's environment and mental illness. She developed planned environmental therapy to treat this relationship. She theorised that focusing on the well-functioning parts of a patient’s personality could help them to behave better in a social environment. Planned environmental therapy is seen as a forerunner of the therapeutic community movement.

To put her theory to work, she set up Q-camps, the first of which was founded in 1936 at Hawkspur. The Q-camps were therapeutic communities for criminal and difficult men. Franklin was appointed as the committee's honorary secretary, and other committee members included Donald Winnicott, David Wills and Arthur Barron. From the beginning, the project struggled to get enough funding and eventually had to be shut down.

Even though the Q-camp project was not successful, Franklin did not abandon her planned environmental therapy. In 1966, she founded the Planned Environmental Therapy Trust (PETT) to promote research, discussion and training about the PET approach. The PETT closed in 2018 and its holdings were given over to the Mulberry Bush Organisation.
