= Diana Ivanova =

Bulgarian journalist

- Диана Иванова
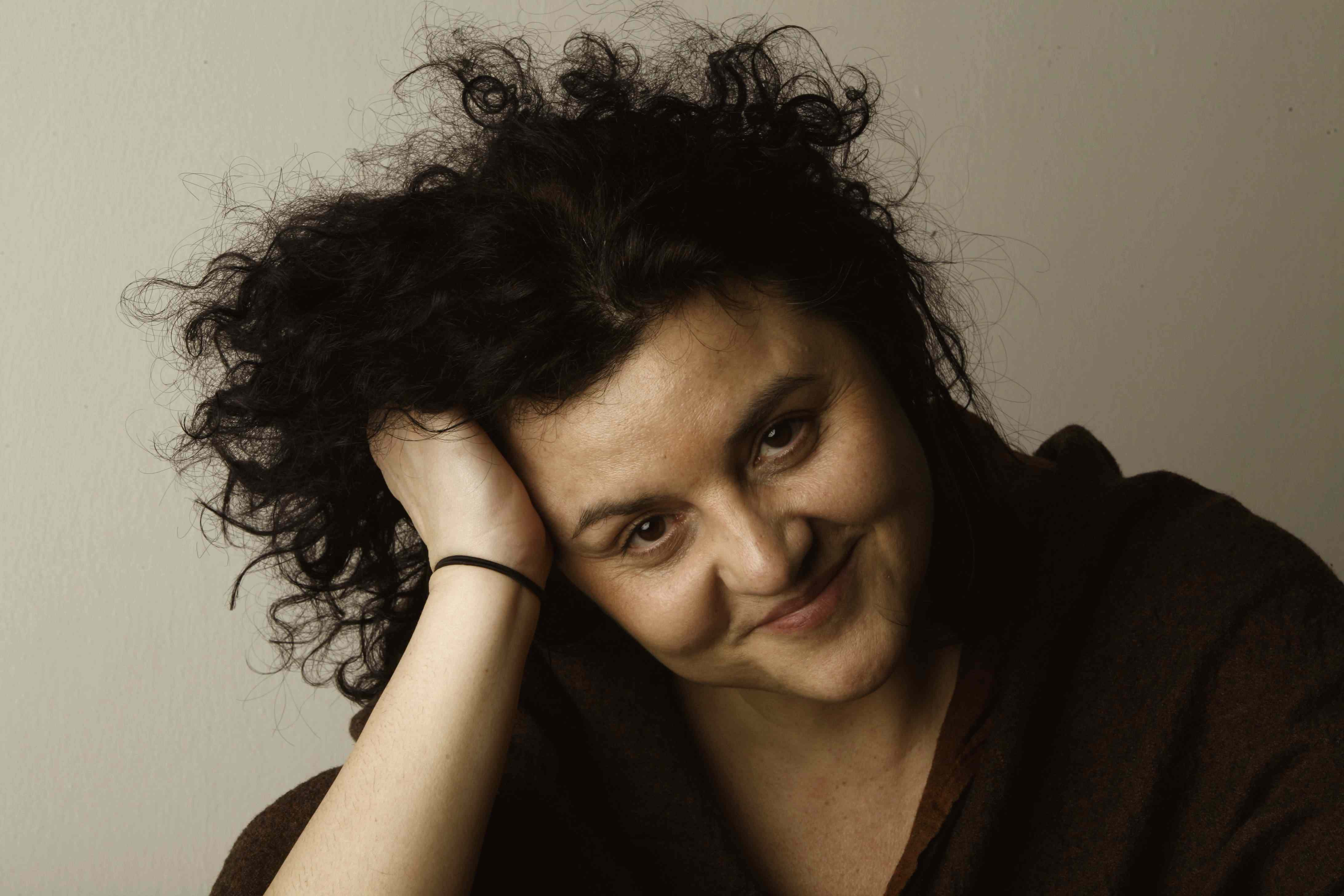
- Born: Montana, People's Republic of Bulgaria
- Education: University of Sofia
- Occupations: Journalist; Author; Documentary filmmaker

Diana Ivanova (Bulgarian Диана Иванова; born in Montana, Bulgaria) is a Bulgarian journalist, author and documentary filmmaker. In her professional work she is interested in intercultural dialogue between people in Bulgaria and other countries, preferably Germany. As cultural manager and curator, she is committed to international understanding and cultural exchange and organizes every year in northwestern Bulgaria an international cultural festival. As a group analyst in Sofia and Bonn she deals with traumas that have been suffered due to the political situation in both countries in the time before the political change in Europe - in Germany primarily by citizens of the GDR.

== Professional background ==
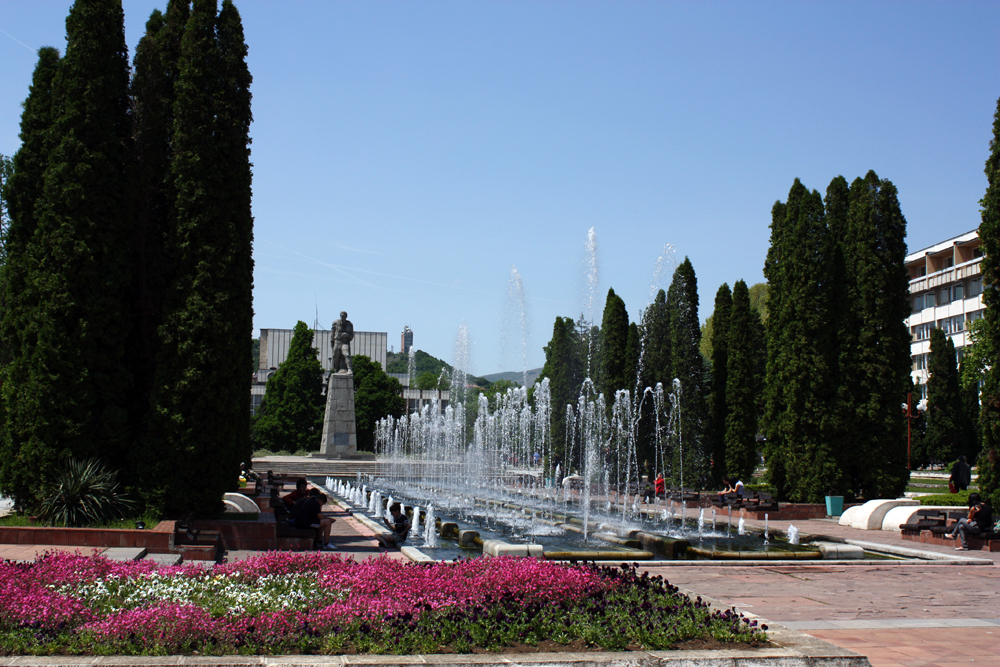
Montana central square

When Diana Ivanova went to school her birthplace still was wearing the name Mihajlovgrad. It was given up in 1993 in favor of the original name Montana. On the local German school, which maintained friendly relations with the Thuringian school in Schmalkalden as part of a twinning, she passed the Abitur. She lives and works in Bonn and Sofia.

Ivanova studied Cultural anthropology and Mass communication at the University of Sofia, where she 1991 obtained a Master in Journalism. After that she worked as a journalist until 1995, including as reporter and moderator at Bulgarian National Television. She then until 2003 was Radio journalist at Radio Free Europe in Prague. That same year she completed her training as a cultural manager on International Centre for Culture and Management (ICCM) at Prof. Herwig Poeschl in Salzburg. In 2005, she was Milena Jesenská scholarship holder at the Institute of Human Sciences. 2014 she completed her training as a group analyst at the International Association for Group Analysis (IAG) in Altaussee. Her dissertation focuses on the relationship between elderly Italians and Bulgarian women who had to leave their villages in regions with hopeless labor market situation to make money with the care of the elderly in Italy, but by that lost contact with their homeland. Since 2003 she is a freelance journalist, among others, for n-ost, Dnevnik, Capital (Bulgaria), Abitare and Foreign Policy. She is also manager of the New Culture Foundation and researched the film heritage of the Bulgarian secret services in Sofia, Berlin and Munich.

== Work ==
Ivanova emphasizes “slow journalism”, as she calls it. Authenticity for her is essential. Journalism of this kind needs time and she is willing to take time. Against this background she is shaping her articles, her films and projects. Contentual focus of her work are the individual and collective traumas of the people in Bulgaria and Germany having been suffered by political circumstances. With her understanding of the trauma phrase she leans on the social psychologist Angela Kühner and the sociologist Kai Erikson, who understands a collective trauma as a “violation of the social tissue and the connections between people”. Cultural exchange and encounter groups are the chosen devices, by which she meets the traumas to prepare the ground for a better future. At the beginning of every project her look goes back to the past, which gives her information about the historical roots of the present and the actual experiences of the people. After her cycle Hello Melancholy was published in Capital weekly, she was awarded on 16 August 2005 by the Austria Press Agency in Vienna with the prize Writing for Central and Eastern Europe (CEE) – for her text Mrs. Bulgarian, Ivan Milev and Gustav Klimt. In December 2013 Ivanova was for the second time invited on a scholarship for one month in the Künstlerhaus Villa Waldberta in Feldafing. Among other things, she there showed the Films of the Bulgarian Ministry of State Security, which were presented in the Brotfabrik in Berlin too.

== Projects (Choice) ==
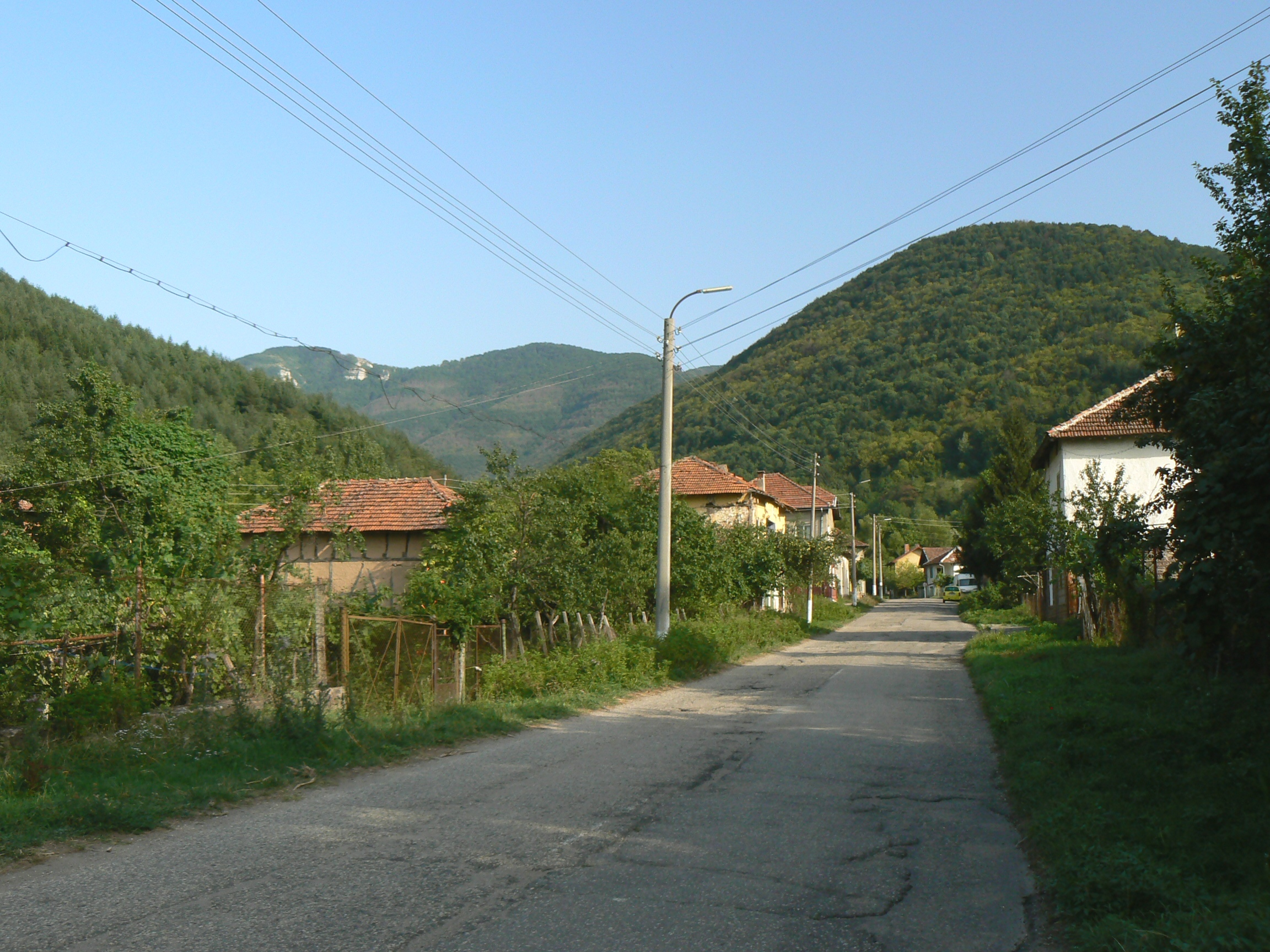
Gorna Bela Rechka in Bulgaria

=== GOATMILK ===
Goat Milk is the name of an international cultural festival, Ivanova, together with the team of the New Culture Foundation organizes every year since 2004 in May as Festival of memories in the village of Gorna Bela Rechka in northwestern Bulgaria. Involved are the almost one hundred more than seventy-years-old residents of the village and artists from different nations – people who otherwise would not meet. In this way, Bela Rechka becomes a place of encounter, where the participants in joint designing the festival share stories, experiences and memories. The project is based on the question whether the cultural differences do separate people fundamentally or whether commonality and understanding are possible. For the inhabitants of the village and the participating guests and artists of the Goatmilk Festival this question already found an answer. At the same time it comes through the festival to a revitalization of this by poverty and loneliness embossed region of the country.

Every year the Goat Milk Festival is dedicated to a theme. 2008 was marked by the replacement of the bell. Although Bela Rechka never had a church, there was a bell in the village. And that was very important for the residents until it was stolen in the 1990s. The Goatmilk Festival paved by help of many artists the way for its replacement. Supported by the Goethe-Institut in Sofia, Bela Rechka 2009 received a new bell. The bell of Bela Rechka was realized within the European program Culture 2000 by the New Culture Foundation in collaboration with the Borderland Foundation (Poland) and the Laundry Association (Birmingham, England). There were also donations and the participation of numerous volunteers.

=== I lived Socialism ===
From 2004 to 2006 Ivanova worked with the poet and writer Georgi Gospodinov and the psychiatrist Rumen Petrov. The focus of their joint project was the question of which traces socialism had left in the souls of men and what influence had these marks on their lifestyle and identity. 171 stories of Bulgarians of different ages were collected. The website on which they were presented, no longer exists; yet they are preserved in a book bearing – in Bulgarian – the title of the project. An online article of The Sofia Echo provides some of the shortened stories.

=== My street ===
The project My street began with the waste crisis 2005 in Bulgaria. It was an opportunity to reflect on the importance of the road, in which people live and feel strange or at home. So Ivanova started initially in Bulgaria and later in Cuba bringing people together who wrote down their story with their street, took photos and then in personal encounter shared with each other. Although many at first did not know what to do with the offer, they developed step by step while participating in the project a new relationship with an environment in which they have always lived but previously had paid little attention.

==== My street Bulgaria ====
Ivanova was invited along with Boris Deliradev by the British Council in Bulgaria, to develop a concept for workshops with young people on the topic The EU and ME. From the desire to avoid general and superficial conversations on the subject, and under the influence of the then current waste crisis the idea for the project My street took shape. After My street Bulgaria having been successful, the project later in Cuba found its continuation.

==== My street Cuban Stories ====
Since 1997 Ivanova traveled to Cuba. 2009 she gathered together with the Iranian-Canadian photographer Babak Salari stories and photos of people and their streets. As in all projects the identity of the people were in the focus and the question of how it is influenced by environment and experience. The result was 2010 a first book and 2012 a second one.

=== Traumas and Miracles ===
Together with Babak Salari Ivanova in 2008 began her research on the project Traumas and Miracles - Portraits from the Northwest of Bulgaria in one of the economically weakest and poorest regions of the country. Inspired by the conviction of the French sociologist and philosopher Maurice Halbwachs, “that all of us unconsciously are ‘an echo’ of events that happened before our time”, the aim of the project was a documentation of the oldest inhabitants of the region and their often traumatic stories. With the intention to create a space “for words, phrases, images, faces that convey a sense of the area”, a “collection of fragments” emerged with portraits and stories of 50 inhabitants in eight villages. 2010 the project was presented to the public with an exhibition at the Institut für die Wissenschaften vom Menschen (IWM) in Vienna and in the National Art Gallery in Sofia. Other presentations followed, from 2016 also in Germany.

=== Filmprojects ===
Ivanova participated in various film projects. For the 2009 released film The Town of Badante Women by Stephan Komandarev she wrote the script. Idea and interviews she contributed to the 2012 released film Father by Ivan Bogdanov, a Bulgarian-, Croat, German co-production. Moreover, she published several short documentaries.

On 14 November 2014, after four years of preparation, her 76-minute documentary Listen premiered in Sofia. It reports about Radio Free Europe (RFE), which broadcast from Munich from 1949 to 1995 but was banned in Bulgaria before the change in Europe. From 1995 to 2003 Ivanova had worked there. In Germany the film found his audience, for example, on 11 June 2015, at the America House (Munich). Here, two former employees from Radio Free Europe (RFE) were invited: Luben Mutafoff, formerly journalist there, and Richard H. Cummings, former head of security – both after the film in an interview with the director. Also in June 2015, the movie was shown at Giessen University that thereafter provided an opportunity for discussion with Ivanova. Also in the naTo in Leipzig and in the Brotfabrik in Berlin the film was shown, as well as in the Filmmuseum Potsdam, in Werkstattkino Munich and in Film Club 813 in Cologne. Outside Germany, the film was presented in Kosovo and Luxembourg. The film historian Claus Löser wrote about the film: “Diana Ivanova succeeds in her debut documentary ‘Listen’ a small miracle. She manages retrospectively to soften the entrenched positions of the European postwar order, without playing down the historical and current conflicts.” In the year of its formation Ivanova was awarded with the Best Director Award for LISTEN as best first film. The film was developed with the support of the Bulgarian National Film Center. After completing this film works, Ivanova turned researching the film archive of the Bulgarian State Security to what she received a grant from the Federal Foundation for the Reappraisal of the SED Dictatorship.

=== Self-Awareness-Groups ===
Since 2012 Ivanova organizes and since 2013 she conducts self-awareness-groups in Bonn and Sofia. As method she applies the technique of group analysis. Her interest in this context is it, to give a place to the suffering of people inflicted due to political circumstances on which it could be heard and may be alleviated.

== Publications ==
- Ivanova, Diana (2010). How to make a bell. Plovdiv/Bulgaria: Janet 45. ISBN 978-954-491-544-5.
- Salari, Babak (Photos); Ivanova, Diana (Text) (2010). My Street. Cuban Stories. Plovdiv/Bulgaria: Janet 45. ISBN 978-954-491-603-9.
- Dietrich, Martin (Photos); Ivanova, Diana (Text) (2012). Behind doors. Plovdiv/Bulgaria: Janet 45. ISBN 978-954-491-798-2.
- Ivanova, Diana (2013). Basma and Gabardine. Poems [Басма и габардин] (in Bulgarian). Plovdiv/Bulgaria: Janet 45. ISBN 978-954-491-944-3.
- Salari, Babak (Photos); Ivanova, Diana (Text) (2016). Trauma und Wunder. Porträts aus dem Nordwesten Bulgariens (in German). Plovdiv/Bulgaria: Janet 45. ISBN 978-619-186-221-4. (Bulgarian and English Edition 2016)

== Filmography ==
- 2014: LISTEN (76 Min.)
- 2012: The Abandoned Northwest (22 Min.)
- 2010: My Street Cuba (28 Min.)
- 2010: Between Havana and Sofia (16 Min.)

== Awards ==
- 2014: HostwriterPrize Collaboration in Journalism (together with Dagmar Gester)
- 2014: Prize for the best debut-film Golden Rhyton Festival Award
- 2007: Robert Schumann Journalist Award
- 2005: Journalistprize Writing for Central and Eastern Europe (CEE)
- 1993: National Award for the best short TV news presentation
