= The Voice of a Woman =

Platform for women creatives and leaders

Voice of a Woman
- Founded: 2009; 17 years ago
- Founder: Maureen A. Bryan
- Major events: Platform for the works of women filmmakers, artists and thought leaders internationally
- Website: thevoiceofawoman.com

The Voice of a Woman (VOW) & Voices In Art (VIA), is an organization founded by Maureen A. Bryan in 2009 to exhibit the works of artists in film, contemporary art and music. THE VOICE OF A WOMAN FESTIVAL | VOW FEST has been presented each year in London, New York, Cannes and Jamaica.

== History ==
Maureen A. Bryan, founder and chief executive officer of VOW & VIA, earned a master's degree in directing theatre from The Actors Studio in New York (1994) under its President (actor) Paul Newman and later the director Arthur Penn and actors Ellen Burstyn, Al Pacino, Harvey Keitel.

Sponsored by HBO THE VOICE OF A WOMAN FESTIVAL has featured a curated program of film screenings and talks, live music performances, and contemporary art exhibitions, while amplifying issues related to women and girls and the works of international NGO’s such as Amnesty International, Human Rights Watch and others.

Since 2016, VOW has held its annual film festival in New York City sponsored by HBO.

In November 2018, THE VOICE OF A WOMAN FESTIVAL, sponsored by Miu Miu, HBO and Kodak, was held at the Museum of Modern Art (MoMA) in New York City, featuring the work of such artists and filmmakers as Agnès Varda, Ava DuVernay, So Yong Kim, Elizabeth Columba, Crystal Moselle, Zoe Cassavetes, Chloë Sevigny, Naomi Kawase, Haifaa Al Mansour, Dakota Fanning, Hiam Abbass, Miranda July, Massy Tadjedin, Giada Colagrande, Lucrecia Martel, Alice Rohrwacher, Ming Smith, Lynn Hershman Leeson, and Adepero Oduye. In the same year THE VOICE OF A WOMAN FESTIVAL JAMAICA was launched featuring Grace Jones in Kingston and Ochio Rios as part of a campaign to End Violence Against Women and Girls.

== The Voice of a Woman Awards ==
In 2012 The Voice of a Woman Awards were launched in London at the National Portrait Gallery.

Recipients in the UK, US and France have included: Ming Smith, Shirin Neshat, Grace Jones, Dr. Scilla Elworthy, Deeyah Khan, Bethanne Hardison, Zoë Wanamaker CBE, Sylvia Syms OBE, Alison Owen, Kim Longinotto, Darnell Martin, Shola Lynch, So Yong Kim, Chloe Sevigny, and others.

== VOW Talks ==
As part of an international traveling series VOW has featured live talk events, which have featured: Nina Menkes, Shirin Neshat, Kim Longinotto, Germaine Greer, Darnell Martin, Grace Jones, Ming Smith, Elizabeth Columba, Deeyah Khan, Dr. Scilla Elworthy PhD, and others.

== International Projects ==
VOW also engages in projects that deliver mentoring and training internationally. Over the years VOW has collaborated with UNICEF, UN WOMEN, Amnesty International, Human Rights Watch, and other NGOs on international projects. VOW has also worked with grassroots organizations, schools, universities and communities in South Africa, Tanzania, Uganda, Jamaica, the UK and the US.
