= Babak Salari =

Iranian photographer (born 1959)

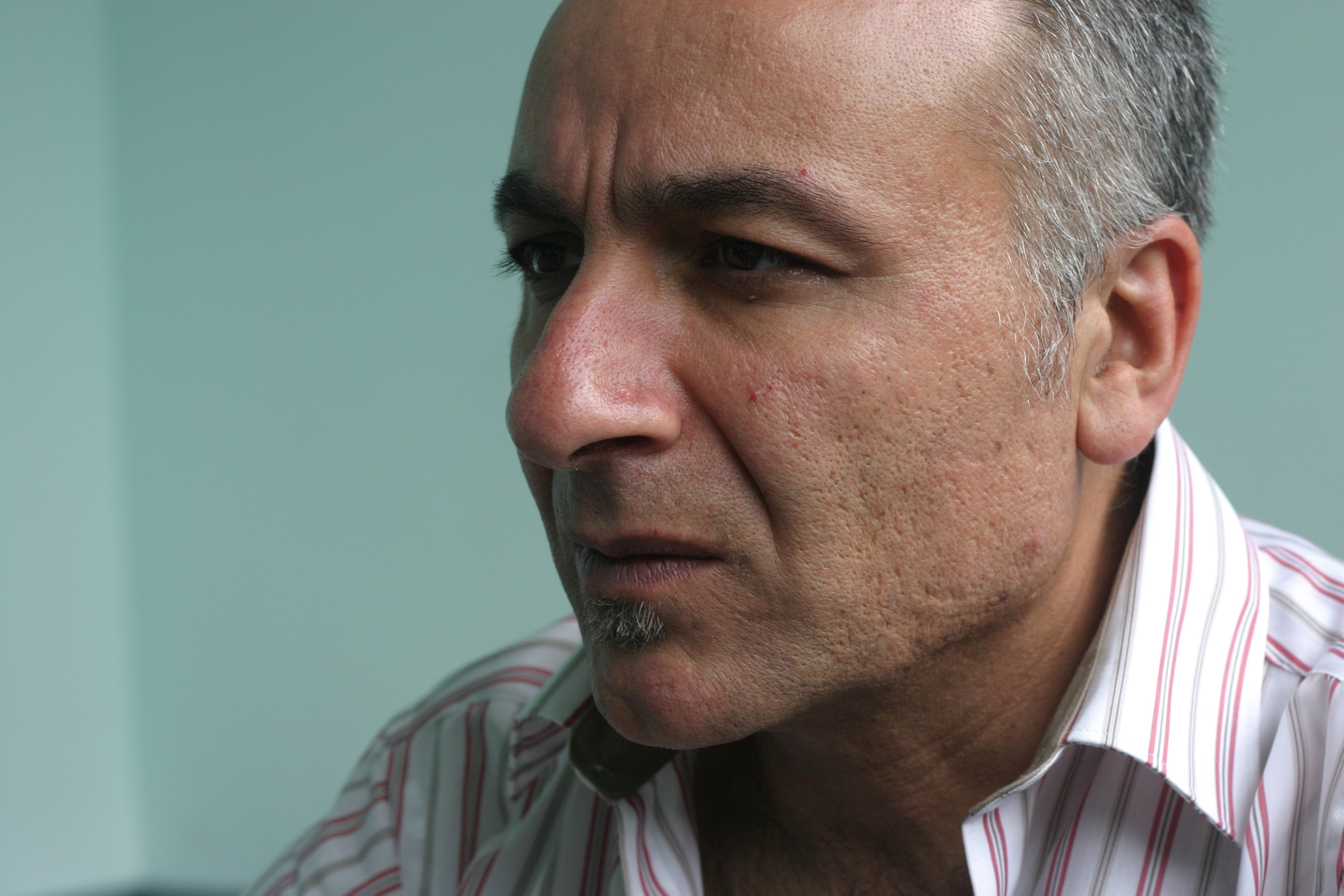

Babak Salari (born March 21, 1959) is an Iranian-Canadian freelance photographer, based in Montreal, educated at Concordia University and Dawson College and specialized in black and white documentary photography.

Born in Shiraz, Iran, Salari's interest in photography began as a teenager in his native Iran where he contributed to various publications. Salari has been documenting the life of common people in Afghanistan, Jordan, Iraq, Kurdistan, Palestine, Israel, Mexico, Cuba, Bulgaria. He has received many awards, including a Gold Addy from the American Ad Federation in 2004 for his work Locating Afghanistan.

== Publications ==
Four of his projects have been published by publishing house Janet 45:

- Traumas and Miracles: Portraits of Northwestern Bulgaria(2010, in collaboration with Diana Ivanova)
- My Street: Cuban Stories (2010, in collaboration with Diana Ivanova)
- Remembering the People of Afghanistan (2009)
- Faces, Bodies, Personas: Tracing Cuban Stories (2008).
