= Michael Abercrombie =

British cell biologist and embryologist (1912–1979)

Michael Abercrombie FRS
- Born: 14 August 1912; Dymock, Gloucestershire, UK
- Died: 28 May 1979 (aged 66); Little Shelford, Cambridge, UK
- Education: University of Oxford
- Spouse: Minnie Louie (Jane) Johnson
- Children: Nicholas Abercrombie
- Father: Lascelles Abercrombie
- Scientific career
- Fields: developmental and cell biology
- Workplaces: University of Cambridge, UK; University of Birmingham, UK; University College London, UK; University of Oxford, UK

Michael Abercrombie FRS (14 August 1912 – 28 May 1979) was a British cell biologist and embryologist. He was one of four children of the poet Lascelles Abercrombie.

== Early life ==
Michael was born at Ryton near Dymock in Gloucestershire on 14 August 1912, the third son of Lascelles Abercrombie, poet and critic, and his wife, Catherine, daughter of Owen Gwatkin, a surgeon at Grange-over-Sands. His uncle was the famed British town planner, Patrick Abercrombie.

Abercrombie went to school at Liverpool College and then Leeds Grammar School. In 1931 he entered Queen's College, University of Oxford, to study Zoology under Professor Gavin de Beer, supported by a Hastings scholarship. He was awarded a first class BSc in 1934.

== Later life ==
He moved to the Strangeways Research Laboratory at the University of Cambridge to undertake doctoral research. In 1938 was employed at University of Birmingham as a lecturer, while also holding a research fellowship at Queen's College, University of Oxford. At Birmingham he met another lecturer, Minnie Johnson, whom he married on 17 July 1939. He was classified as unfit for military service in the Second World War and moved to University of Oxford to work on wound healing and nerve regeneration until 1943, then returned to Birmingham.

In 1947 he and his wife moved to the anatomy and zoology departments at University College London. He was elected a Fellow of the Royal Society in 1958. He finally became director of the Strangeways Research Laboratory at Cambridge from 1970 until his death. Here Abercrombie studied cell population growth and behaviour.

He notably discovered that animal cells moving through tissue culture will halt when they come into contact with another cell of the same type, with the important exception of cancer cells. This discovery led to new interest and research into the dynamics and growth of cancer cells.

He was also involved in popularising science. Particularly successful projects were the co-authored Penguin Dictionary of Biology in 1951 (with co-author C. J. Hickman and others, reaching 11th edition in 2004) and the Penguin New Biology series (1945 - 1960), co-edited with his wife (writing as M. L. Johnson), and from 1953 with botanist Gordon Elliott Fogg. They also wrote articles for New Biology.

He died at home in Cambridge on 28 May 1979.

== Family ==
He married Minnie Louie ("Jane") Johnson in 1939. Together they had one son, Nicholas Abercrombie who became a noted sociologist.

== Selected publications ==
- Abercrombie, M. (1950). Dictionary of Biology.
- Abercrombie, M.; Heaysman, J. E. M. (1953). "Observations on the social behaviour of cells in tissue culture. I. Speed of movement of chick heart fibroblasts in relation to their mutual contacts". Exp. Cell Res. 5 (1): 111–131. doi:10.1016/0014-4827(53)90098-6. PMID 13083622.
- Abercrombie, M.; Heaysman, J. E. M. (1954). "Observations on the social behaviour of cells in tissue culture. II. 'Monolayering' of fibroblasts". Exp. Cell Res. 6 (2): 293–306. doi:10.1016/0014-4827(54)90176-7. PMID 13173482.
- Abercrombie, M.; Ambrose, E. J. (1958). "Interference microscope studies of cell contacts in tissue culture". Exp. Cell Res. 15 (2): 322–345. doi:10.1016/0014-4827(58)90034-X. PMID 13597891.
- Abercrombie is also known for editing and co-founding the Penguin New Biology textbook. He was one of the founders and first editor (1953–62) of Journal of Embryology and Experimental Morphology (renamed Development in 1987).
