= Q Camp =

Experimental communities in Hawkspur Green, Essex, England

The Q Camps (Q for query or quest) were two experimental communities set up at Hawkspur Green in England. They were based on Planned Environment Therapy developed by Marjorie Franklin. This therapy focuses on well-functioning parts of a patient’s personality to help them to behave better in a social environment. The goal was to create a self-governing community of delinquent boys and young adults. Later, they included children who could not be included in the evacuation programme because of their behavioural problems.

The first Q camp opened in 1936 and was open to young adults who were labelled as maladjusted. Marjorie Franklin was the driving force behind the project and later functioned as honorary secretary on the board. Quaker David Wills led the camp until it closed when the Second World War broke out. By that time the Q camp committee took over the charge of a hostel in Bicester meant for evacuated boys who could not be placed elsewhere. This was not without trouble. The building was in poor condition, there was not enough funding and continuous clashes between the younger and older groups led to the older inhabitants being placed elsewhere. In 1940 Franklin got Donald Winnicott involved in the project as the medical psychologist. When in 1941 the project was disbanded he took over the oversight of the smaller hostels that came in its place.

The second Q camp opened in 1944 and was now aimed at younger boys that were involved in criminal behaviour. For example, children that could not be placed under the British Government's Evacuation Scheme were placed here. Arthur Barron took over as camp chief. He thought children could learn discipline by taking on shared responsibilities but should not be forced to do so. Some funders and parents raised concerns about the welfare of the children, who continued in their antisocial behaviour by setting fires and destroying property, and rejected any of the responsibilities required for running and maintaining the camp. The camp was eventually shut down in 1946 after a fire broke out.

The Q camps were part of a living-and-learning-community movement, an antecedent to the later therapeutic communities. They all shared the principles of shared responsibility and decision-making, and participation.
