= Group Analysis (journal) =

Academic psychotherapy journal

- Discipline: Group Studies
- Language: English
- Edited by: Dieter Nitzgen

Publication details
- History: 1967 -present
- Publisher: SAGE Publications
- Frequency: Quarterly
- Impact factor: (2010)

Standard abbreviations
- ISO 4: Group Anal.

Indexing
- ISSN: 0533-3164
- LCCN: 70009541
- OCLC no.: 223639603

Links
- Journal homepage; Online access; Online archive

Group Analysis is a peer-reviewed academic journal that publishes papers four times a year in the field of group analytic psychotherapy. The journal's editor is Dieter Nitzgen. It has been in publication since 1967 and is currently published by SAGE Publications on behalf of Group Analytic Society International. The Society also publishes a newsletter, Group Analytic Contexts edited by Peter Zelaskowski. Past issues are available for download from the link below.

== Scope ==
Group Analysis aims to explore the theory, practice and experience of analytical group dynamics. The journal covers areas such as psychoanalytic psychology, social psychology and anthropology, providing an interdisciplinary forum for discussion among practitioners, theoreticians and researchers.

== Abstracting and indexing ==
Group Analysis is abstracted and indexed in the following databases:

- Academic Premier
- Business Source Premier
- British Education Index
- Current Contents: Social and Behavioral Sciences
- Educational Research Abstracts Online
- SciVal
- SCOPUS
- Social Sciences Citation Index (Impact Factor pending)
