= Thomas Main =

English psychiatrist and psychoanalogist

Thomas Forrest Main
- Born: 25 February 1911; Johannesburg, South Africa
- Died: 29 May 1990 (aged 78–79); Barnes, London, England
- Resting place: England
- Known for: developing the Cassel Hospital, and The Ailment The Institute of Psychosexual Medicine, co-editor of the British Journal of Medical Psychology
- Spouse: Agnes Mary (Molly) McHaffie MD
- Children: 4 children
- Scientific career
- Fields: Medicine, Psychiatry, Psychoanalysis
- Workplaces: British Army Medical Services, Gateshead Mental Hospital, Northfield Army Hospital, Cassel Hospital, British Psychoanalytic Society

Thomas Forrest Main (1911–1990) was a South African-British psychiatrist and psychoanalyst who coined the term 'therapeutic community'. He is particularly remembered for his often cited paper, The Ailment (1957).

== Life ==
Thomas Main was born on 25 February 1911 in Johannesburg, where his father was a mine manager who had emigrated there from England. At the start of World War I, his mother returned to England with Thomas and his two sisters Isabella and Mary, while his father joined the South African Army. Main was educated at the Royal Grammar School, Newcastle-upon-Tyne before studying medicine at Durham University, graduating in 1933 and becoming a doctor in 1938. Specializing in psychiatry, he gained a Diploma in Psychological Medicine from Dublin in 1936. In 1937 he married Agnes Mary (Molly) McHaffie who also graduated in medicine at Durham University and who also became a psychoanalyst. They had three daughters and a son, Jennifer (Johns), Deborah (Hutchinson), Ursula (Kretzschmar) and Andrew.

Main worked as superintendent at Gateshead Mental Hospital. During the Second World War, he joined the Royal Army Medical Corps as an adviser in psychiatry, attaining the rank of lieutenant colonel and working at the Northfield Army Hospital for the treatment of war neuroses. The work conducted at Northfield is considered by many psychiatrists to have been the first example of an intentional therapeutic community. The principles developed at Northfield were also developed and adapted at Civil Resettlement Units established at the end of the war to help returning prisoners of war to adapt back to civilian society and for civilians to adapt to having these men back amongst them.

The term "therapeutic community" was coined by Lt. Col. Main in his 1946 paper, "The hospital as a therapeutic institution", and subsequently developed by others including Maxwell Jones, R. D. Laing at the Philadelphia Association, David Cooper, and by Joshua Bierer.

After the war, Main joined the Cassel Hospital, as medical director in 1946 and continued working there for the next thirty years.

Training as a psychoanalyst under Michael Balint, he was supervised by Anna Freud, Melanie Klein and Paula Heimann. In 1974, he co-founded with Michael Balint the charitable Institute of Psychosexual Medicine in London. He served as its Life President. He also served as vice-president of the Royal College of Psychiatrists, and was a co-editor of the British Journal of Medical Psychology. He died in Barnes, London on 29 May 1990, aged 79.

His papers are held in the Archive of the British Psychoanalytic Society, whose member he was for many years.

== Works ==
- The hospital as a therapeutic institution
- The Ailment and other Psycho-Analytical Essays, ed. Jennifer Johns, London: Free Association Books, 1989. ISBN 1-85343-105-2. The noted essay, The Ailment, is a report of Main's detailed study of the feelings aroused in a team of nurses caring for a group of psychiatric patients with low potential for recovery. He found that a sedative would be used in the management of a patient "only at the moment when the nurse had reached the limit of her human resources and was no longer able to stand the patient's problems without anxiety, impatience, guilt, anger or despair".
- Mothers with children on a psychiatric unit
- A fragment on mothering
- Meanings of madness : psychiatry comes of age
