= Hawkspur Green =

Hamlet in Essex, England

Coordinates: 51.9625°N 0.4105°E

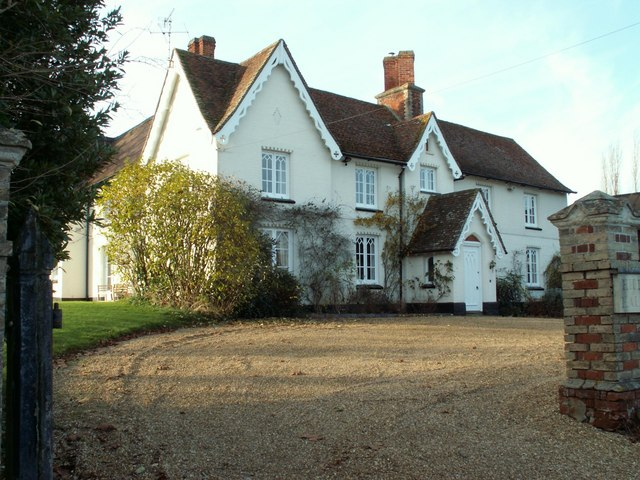
- Hill Hall

- Location within Essex
- Civil parish: Little Bardfield
- District: Uttlesford
- Shire county: Essex
- Region: East
- Country: England
- Sovereign state: United Kingdom
- Police: Essex
- Fire: Essex
- Ambulance: East of England

Hawkspur Green is a hamlet in the civil parish of Little Bardfield, in the Uttlesford district, in the county of Essex, England. It is located near the villages of Great Bardfield and Finchingfield. Hawkspur Green contains one listed building called Moor Hall (grade II listed). From 1936 to 1940, it was the site of the Q Camp, an experimental community.
