= Peace Direct =

London-based international charity

Peace Direct is a charity based in London, England, which supports grassroots peacebuilders in areas of conflict. Peace Direct focuses on supporting grassroots peacebuilders who are local to the conflict and have a clear vision of what needs to be achieved. Peace Direct funds this work, promotes it and learns from it. The current CEO of Peace Direct is Dylan Mathews.

== Origins ==
Peace Direct was founded by Scilla Elworthy and Carolyn Hayman OBE in 2003. Elworthy previously founded the Oxford Research Group and Hayman was Chief Executive at the Foyer Federation.

== Projects ==
Peace Direct believes that local people have the power to find their own solutions to conflict. Peace Direct's mission is to help them to make this happen.

Local people are the key to preventing, resolving and healing conflicts. They are the best way to break recurrent cycles of violence and make peace last. Increasingly they want to move away from depending on outside help and towards building their own futures. Peace Direct helps this strategic shift, and adds value to their efforts on the ground. Firstly, by raising funds for their programmes and offering management support and advice. Secondly, by building recognition for their work and putting them in touch with those in the wider world who can assist with funds and influence. And thirdly, through promoting the concept of locally led peacebuilding to the international community so that others will adopt this approach too.

Peace Direct funds projects in the Democratic Republic of Congo, Burundi, Sudan and South Sudan, Zimbabwe, Sri Lanka, Pakistan, Philippines, Nigeria, Somalia, Israel/Palestine, and Syria. The projects Peace Direct funds in these countries must demonstrate a commitment to non-violence, have a track record, strategic ambition, a desire to communicate and carry out work that fits with Peace Direct's charitable aims.

Peace Direct is also responsible for the pioneering web-based project Insight on Conflict an online database of local peacebuilding organisations in areas of conflict.

== Patrons ==
- Emma Kirkby
- Helena Kennedy
- Mark Rylance
- Prince Hassan bin Talal
