= Eric de Maré =

British photographer (1910–2002)

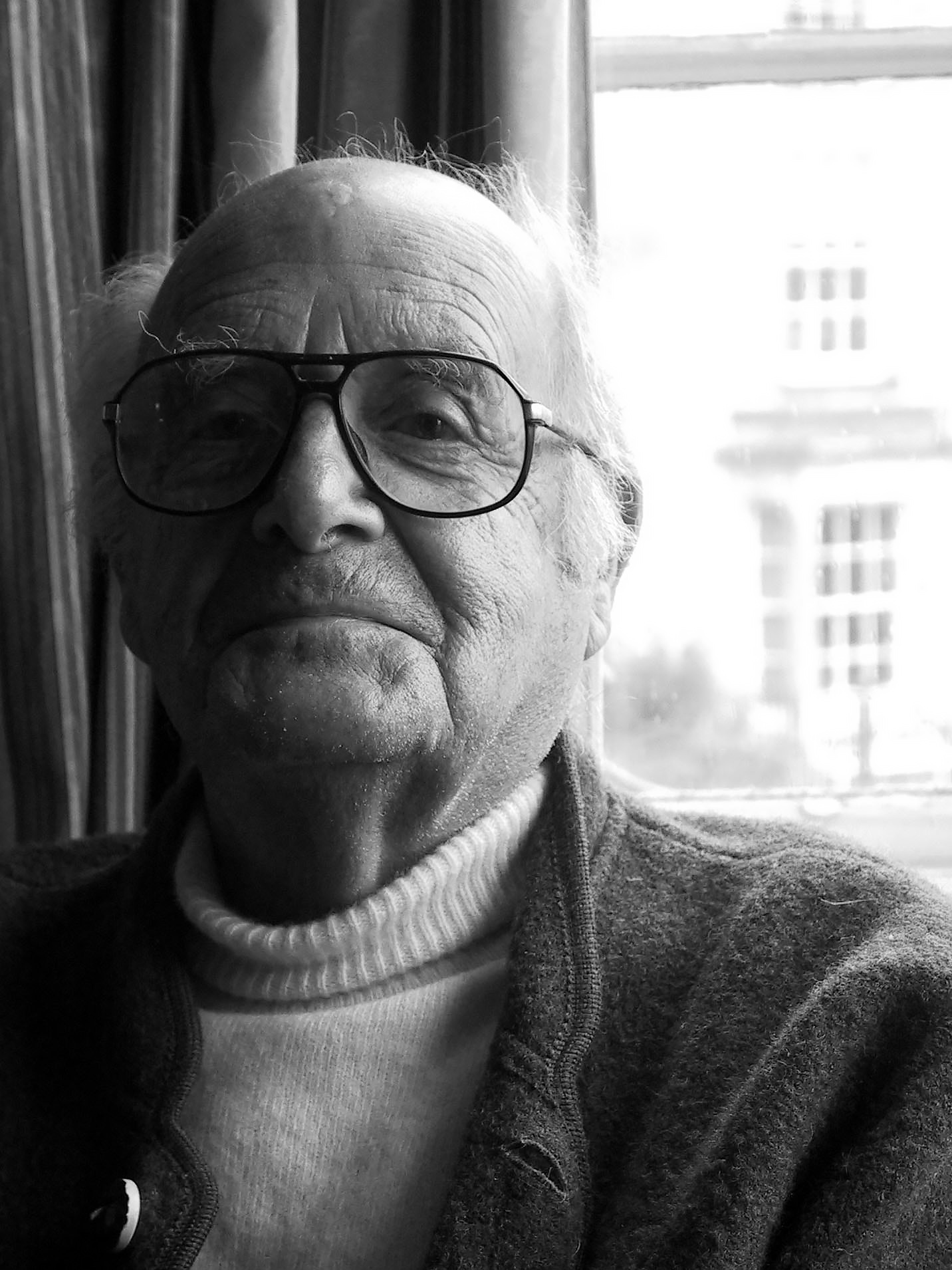
- Born: 10 September 1910; London
- Died: 22 January 2002 (aged 91); Painswick, Gloucestershire
- Occupations: Architectural photographer, Author
- Years active: 1933–2002

Eric de Maré (1910 – 2002) was a British photographer and author, described as one of the greatest British architectural photographers.

== Biography ==
Eric Samuel de Maré was born in London on the 10 September 1910, the second son of Swedish parents, Bror Edward August de Maré (a timber broker) and his wife Ellen Ingrid (née Tellander). His younger brother was the psychotherapist Patrick de Maré. He was educated at St Paul's School in London before becoming a student of the Architectural Association in 1928. Following graduation in 1933, he went to Scandinavia to travel and work. A number of his later publications focus on Sweden. He was a supporter of the Social Credit movement.

He married firstly in London in 1936 Marjorie Vanessa (née Vallance) and secondly in Henley in 1974 Enid, née Hill, designer and colour theorist, widow of Terence Verity.

== Working life ==
On his return to England from Sweden, de Maré joined the Architectural Press and became the acting editor of Architects' Journal, in 1943. In 1942, de Maré had published his first book, titled Britain Rebuilt. The subsequent years saw the publication of further books and articles within the architectural press. Many of the subjects covered in these works are represented within the collection held by the public English Heritage Archive.

He asserted that photography and, more importantly the photographer, was key to a critical appreciation of architecture. In Gerald Woods' 1972 book 'Art without Boundaries' de Maré wrote: "The photographer is perhaps the best architectural critic, for, by felicitous framing and selection, he can communicate direct and powerful comments both in praise and protest: he can also discover and reveal architecture where none was intended."

In that vein, in 1948, he started his documentation of the canals and waterways in which he explored the "vernacular (and) the anonymous architecture" which made up much of the landscape of the country. In that year he boated a dozen of the English canals during a 600-mile tour, photographing the landscapes, buildings and people he encountered. The record of this journey resulted in a special issue of Architectural Review in 1949. The following year saw the publication of The Canals of England. The book provided a historical and technical description of inland waterways graced with de Maré's photography.

As a result of his work on canals, he was commissioned in 1950 to travel throughout England to photograph early industrial sites and buildings by the then editor of the Architectural Review, A. R. Richards. The resulting images were combined with J.M. Richard's text in The Functional Tradition in Early Industrial Buildings, which was published by the Architectural Press in 1958. The Functional Tradition within architecture had received little attention from contemporary architects until this study which promoted an increased interest in the qualities of early industrial structures.

De Maré's work in the 1960s reflected the other end of the industrial spectrum, focussing on modern power generation plants, to which his photographs frequently conferred a sculptural quality.

== Legacy ==
In 1990 and in recognition of de Maré's 80th birthday, Michael Hopkins and Partners presented to the Architects' Association Foundation a large collection of de Maré's photographic negatives. The Architects' Association then honoured de Maré with a retrospective exhibition of his photographs in 1990.

De Maré died on 22 January 2002, aged 91. The death was registered in Stroud, Gloucestershire. The Guardian said that to most architects and architectural historians he was the finest architectural photographer of the mid-20th century. The Daily Telegraph described him as one of the most notable photographers of his time, as well as a prolific author.

A number of photographs attributed to de Maré appear in the Conway Library at the Courtauld Institute of Arts, London. The collection consists mainly of architectural images and is in the process of being digitised as part of the Courtauld Connects project.

== Selected publications ==
- Eric de Maré, The Canals of England (1950, 1987, ISBN 978-1-84868-160-6, ISBN 0-86299-418-7)
- Eric de Maré, Bridges of Britain (1954, 1975, 1987, ISBN 0-7134-2925-9)
- Eric de Maré, London's Riverside (1958)
- James Maude Richards; Photographs by Eric de Maré, The Functional Tradition in Early Industrial Buildings (1958)
- Eric de Maré, City of Westminster; Heart of London (1968)
- Eric de Maré, Photography (1957) Penguin books
- Eric de Maré, Photography and Architecture (1961) Penguin Books
- Eric de Maré, Architectural Photography (1975) Penguin Books
- Eric de Maré, Wren's London (1975) ISBN 0-7181-1586-4
- Eric de Maré, A Matter of Life or Debt (1983) ISBN 0-949667-83-8
- Higgott, Andrew, Eric de Maré: Photographer, Builder with Light. London: AA Publications, 1990. ISBN 1-870890-28-0
- Elwall, Robert, Eric de Mare. London: RIBA Publishing, 2000. ISBN 978-1-85946-083-2
- Eric de Maré, Your book of Paper Folding Fun. Faber and Faber, 1968. ISBN 057108446X
- Eric de Mare, Colour Photography. Penguin Books, 1968
