= John Sloboda =

John Anthony Sloboda OBE FBA (born 13 June 1950) is Emeritus Professor at the Guildhall School of Music and Drama where he led research on the Social Impact of Making Music. He is also one of the founders of the Iraq Body Count project.

== Biography ==
Sloboda was educated at St Benedict's School, Ealing. He studied at Queen’s College, Oxford and University College, London, where he took his PhD.

His academic work has mainly been in music psychology, a subdiscipline which draws together psychologists, neuroscientists and academic musicians. His research interests have focused on the psychological aspects of the study of music performance, the emotional response to music, the functions of music in everyday life, learning and skill acquisition in music, and audience-performer relations in the live concert. He was Professor of Psychology at Keele University until 2008, where he now has emeritus status. From 2005-2009 he was Executive Director of the Oxford Research Group, an NGO that sought to develop non-violent approaches to national and international security issues. Until 2020 he was co-director of Every Casualty Worldwide, which works towards ensuring that all lives lost to armed conflict, anywhere in the world, are properly recorded. In 2004 he was elected a Fellow of the British Academy to dual membership of both the Psychology and History of Music sections. In 2017 he became founding president of simm-platform.eu an international scholarly body for the study of the Social Impact of Making Music, and is editor of the book series Classic European Music Science Monographs. In 2018 he was awarded the OBE for services to Music and Psychology.

From 1975 to 1995 he was the founding director of the Keele Bach Choir, a "town and gown" choir based on the Keele University campus. He is also patron of Spode Music Week, an annual residential music school that places particular emphasis on the music of the Roman Catholic liturgy. He currently collaborates with the singer Rafael Montero, founder of the early music group El Parnaso Hyspano.

== Books ==
- Acquisition of Symbolic Skills (Proceedings of a NATO Human Factors Programme Conference, Keele, July 1982). New York: Plenum Press, 1983. pp 623. (ed. with Don Rogers)
- The Musical Mind: The Cognitive Psychology of Music. Oxford University Press, 1985. pp 291.
- Cognitive Processes in Mathematics. (selected and edited papers from the first International Keele Cognition Seminar, March 1985.) Oxford University Press, 1987. (ed. with Don Rogers)
- Generative Processes in Music: The Psychology of Composition, Performance, and Improvisation. London: Oxford University Press, 1988. (ed.)
- Cognition and Social Worlds. (selected and edited papers from the second International Keele Cognition Seminar, March 1987) London: Oxford University Press, 1989. (ed. with Angus Gellatly and Don Rogers)
- Musical Perceptions. New York: Oxford University Press, 1994. pp 290 (with Rita Aiello)
- The Origins and Development of Musical Competence. London: Oxford University Press/ Paris: Presses Universitaires de France, 1995. (ed. with Irène Deliège)
- Perception and Cognition of Music. Psychologists Press, 1997. (ed. with Irène Deliège)
- Music and Emotion: Theory and Research. Oxford: Oxford University Press, 2001. pp 487. (ed. with Patrik N. Juslin)
- Exploring the Musical Mind: Cognition, Emotion, Ability, Function. Oxford: Oxford University Press, 2005.
- Beyond Terror: The Truth About the Real Threats to Our World. London: Rider. (with Chris Abbott and Paul Rogers)
- Psychology for Practicing Musicians: Understanding and Acquiring the Skills. New York: Oxford University Press, 2007. (with Andreas C. Lehmann and Robert H. Woody)
- Handbook of Music and Emotion: Theory, Research, Applications. Oxford: Oxford University Press, 2009. pp. 975. (ed. with Patrik N. Juslin)
