= Little Bardfield =

Village in Essex, England

Coordinates: 51.950613°N 0.414047°E

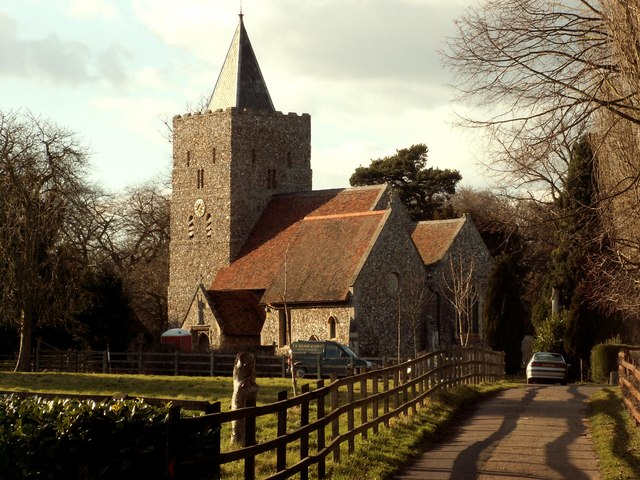
- St. Katherine's church, Little Bardfield

- Location within Essex
- Population: 256 (Parish, 2021)
- OS grid reference: TL655305
- District: Uttlesford
- Shire county: Essex
- Region: East
- Country: England
- Sovereign state: United Kingdom
- Post town: Braintree
- Postcode district: CM7
- Dialling code: 01371
- Police: Essex
- Fire: Essex
- Ambulance: East of England
- UK Parliament: Saffron Walden

Little Bardfield is a village and civil parish in the Uttlesford district of northwest Essex, England. Little Bardfield is a small scattered village on the southwest side of the vale of the River Pant. A minor road (Bardfield Road) runs through the village and connects Thaxted 3 miles (5 km) to the west, to Great Bardfield 1 mile (1.6 km) to the east. The parish comprises the village of Little Bardfield and two hamlets: Hawkspur Green and Oxen End, which are all surrounded by farmland. At the 2021 census the parish had a population of 256.

Little Bardfield's church is dedicated to St Katharine, and contains an Anglo-Saxon tower. In 1774 Sarah Bernard, widow of the Rev Thomas Bernard, by will directed her executors to cut down all the timber in Halsted Grove. With the proceeds of this, they erected a school and five terraced almshouses.

The nave and tower of St Katharine's Church date from circa 1040AD, with a fourteenth century chancel and porch. The interior was entirely restored in 2006 when the integrated decorative scheme devised for the church by G.F. Bodley in 1866 was reinstated. Between 1910 and 1940 the Brotherhood of St Paul, an Anglo-Catholic theological college which trained around three hundred priests for service overseas, was located in the parish.

== See also ==
The Hundred Parishes
