= Psychology and Psychotherapy =

- Discipline: Psychotherapy
- Language: English
- Edited by: John Fox, Marc Williams

Publication details
- Former name(s): The British Journal of Medical Psychology
- History: 1920–present
- Publisher: Wiley-Blackwell on behalf of the British Psychological Society (United Kingdom)
- Frequency: Quarterly
- Impact factor: 2.244 (2018)

Standard abbreviations
- ISO 4: Psychol. Psychother.

Indexing
- ISSN: 1476-0835 (print); 2044-8341 (web)
- LCCN: 2002252214
- OCLC no.: 231934243

Links
- Journal homepage; Online access; Online archive

Psychology and Psychotherapy: Theory, Research and Practice ("PAPTRAP") is a quarterly peer-reviewed medical journal covering research, assessment and treatment of psychopathologies. It is published by Wiley-Blackwell on behalf of the British Psychological Society and the editors-in-chief are John Fox (University of Sheffield) and Marc Williams (Cardiff University). It was established in 1920 as The British Journal of Medical Psychology.

== Abstracting and indexing ==
The journal is abstracted and indexed in:

- CINAHL
- Current Contents/Clinical Medicine
- Current Contents/Social & Behavioral Sciences
- EBSCO databases
- Embase
- Index Medicus/MEDLINE/PubMed
- PASCAL
- Philosopher's Index
- ProQuest databases
- PsycINFO
- Science Citation Index
- Scopus
- Social Sciences Citation Index
- VINITI Database RAS

According to the Journal Citation Reports, the journal has a 2018 impact factor of 2.244.
