= Oxford Research Group =

UK charity and think tank

Oxford Research Group (ORG) was a London-based charity and think tank in Cambridge Heath, London, UK working on peace, security and justice issues. Its research and dialogue activities were mainly focused on the Middle East, North and West Africa, as well as influencing UK and international security policy.

== History ==
ORG was founded in 1982 by Scilla Elworthy and a group of academics and activists with an interest in the psychological dimensions of international security decision-making. While established in sympathy with Quaker values of peace and social justice, ORG is an independent, secular group without affiliation to any religious or political group. ORG is not a pacifist group in that it recognises that there are legitimate roles and uses for armed forces. Rather, it defines its mission as to enlarge the space for non-military alternatives to prevent and manage conflict. It was registered as a charity in England and Wales in 1988.

Initially, the Group focused on dialogue between British nuclear decision-makers and nuclear disarmament activists, widening its activities to incorporate the other P5 nuclear weapons states, India and Pakistan. For this work, ORG and Elworthy were nominated for the Nobel Peace Prize in 1988, 1989 and 1991. In the 1990s, ORG fostered security dialogue between the UK and China on a broader range of issues.

In 2006 ORG relocated from Oxfordshire to London. Since 2001, it has focused particularly on analysing the causes, consequences and character of the war on terror, promoting more sustainable approaches to international security policy, investigating the changing nature and technologies of warfare, mediating track II dialogues around conflicts in the Middle East, and recording the casualties of armed conflict.

In 2020 ORG announced that due to funding issues it would cease operations at the end of the year. It would re-home some of its programmes elsewhere.

== Work ==
ORG had three thematic programmes and has served as host or incubator for several other projects.

=== Programmes ===
The Sustainable Security Programme aimed to highlight the limitations of orthodox security policy that seeks to contain the symptoms of deeper conflict and to develop policy alternatives that address such underlying drivers as marginalisation, militarisation, climate change and resource scarcity.

The Strategic Peacebuilding Programme was ORG’s conflict resolution programme. It deployed a unique methodology to build the capacity of local partners to engage in strategic dialogue towards lasting political settlements. Formerly the Middle East Programme, it has brokered a series of Track II dialogues in Israel, Palestine and Egypt and between Iran, Saudi Arabia, Syria and other states. The programme uses a strategic thinking methodology based in ‘radical disagreement’ theory to develop strategies for alternative routes to peaceful co-existence.

The Remote Warfare Programme was established in January 2018, based around the Remote Control project of the Network for Social Change, which had been hosted by ORG since 2013. It analyses shifts in military engagements, focusing on Western states’ increasing focus on working through local and regional partner militaries in places such as the Middle East and Africa. As part of this, they examine current developments in military technology and doctrine such as cyber-warfare, unmanned weapons systems (such as unmanned aerial vehicles), private military and security contractors, and special operations forces.

=== Incubation ===
Peace Direct was developed within ORG in 2002 as a project developing links to local peacebuilding organisations in a number of fragile or conflict-affected states, and became a separate organisation in the following year.

Every Casualty Worldwide was developed as a programme of ORG between 2007 and 2014. It aimed to enhance the technical, legal and institutional capacity, as well as the political will, for every single casualty of armed conflict throughout the world to be recorded. It became a separate NGO in October 2014.

The Oxford Process was established in early 2017 to focus on the discreet high-level dialogues that ORG had facilitated over the previous 15 years under Gabrielle Rifkind. It describes its approach as preventive diplomacy to manage radical differences.

== Honours and awards ==
ORG’s founder, Scilla Elworthy, was awarded the Niwano Peace Prize in 2003 for ORG's work on the promotion of disarmament and non-violent methods for resolving conflict.

== Notable current and former staff and associates ==
- Lord John Alderdice
- Prof Frank Barnaby
- Major General Patrick Cordingley
- Hamit Dardagan (co-founder of Iraq Body Count)
- Dr Scilla Elworthy (founder)
- Paul Hilder
- Prof Khaled Hroub
- Paul Ingram
- Tim Livesey
- General David Ramsbotham
- Prof Oliver Ramsbotham
- Gabrielle Rifkind
- Dr Nick Ritchie
- Prof Paul Rogers
- Salman Shaikh (Director of Brookings Doha Center)
- Prof John Sloboda (co-founder of Iraq Body Count)

== Patrons ==
- Dr Hans Blix
- Dr Scilla Elworthy
- Archbishop Desmond Tutu
- Baroness Shirley Williams
