= Scilla Elworthy =

British anti-war activist (born 1943)

- Born: 3 June 1943 (age 83); Galashiels, Scotland
- Education: University of Bradford; Trinity College Dublin
- Occupation: Anti-war activist
- Known for: Founder of the Oxford Research Group

Priscilla "Scilla" Elworthy (born 3 June 1943) is a peace builder, and the founder of the Oxford Research Group, a non-governmental organisation she set up in 1982 to develop effective dialogue between nuclear weapons policy-makers worldwide and their critics, for which she was nominated three times for the Nobel Peace Prize. She served as its executive director from 1982 until 2003, when she left that role to set up Peace Direct, a charity supporting local peace-builders in conflict areas. In 2003 she was awarded the Niwano Peace Prize. From 2005 she was adviser to Peter Gabriel, Desmond Tutu and Richard Branson in setting up The Elders. She is a member of the World Future Council and, in 2012, co-founded Rising Women Rising World, a community of women on all continents who take responsibility for building a world that works for all.

In 2017, she wrote The Business Plan for Peace: Building a World Without War (Peace Direct, 2017) and now leads an organisation of the same name which provides people and organisations with the skills and support to transform conflict.

== Early life and education ==
Born in Galashiels, Scotland, Elworthy attended Berkhamsted School for Girls on a Herts County Scholarship, before moving to Ireland in 1962 to study social sciences at Trinity College, Dublin. During her vacations, she worked in refugee camps in France and Algiers. After graduating, she travelled round West Africa to South Africa and between 1966 and 1969 became involved in marketing for various boutiques, most notably introducing the Mary Quant range. In 1993, she gained her PhD in political science from Bradford University.

== Personal life ==
In 1970, she married Murray McLean, a South African entrepreneur. She is the mother of Polly Jess McLean (born 1974), step-mother of Leigh, Jay, Shirley, Sophie and Pippa, and grandmother of Pearl Mai Mary, Wolfetone and Rainer Jay.

In 2019, Elworthy re-connected to the love of her life, John Hamwee. In 2021 they were married in the Quaker meeting house in Colthouse, Cumbria, and now live very happily in Sherborne village, west of Oxford.

== Career ==
From 1970 to 1976, Elworthy chaired Kupugani, a South African nutrition education organisation, where she set up an initiative that involved the sale of nutritious Christmas hampers to industrial employees, thereby providing annual self-financing for the charity of R6million.

In 1976, she helped organise the building and launch of the Market Theatre, South Africa's first multiracial theatre. Then in 1977, she established the Minority Rights Group in France and in 1978 she researched and delivered their report on female genital mutilation, leading to the World Health Organization campaign to eradicate the practice. From 1979 to 1981 she became a consultant on women's issues to UNESCO and it was during this time that she researched and wrote UNESCO's contribution to the 1980 United Nations Mid-decade Conference on Women: "The role of women in peace research, peace education and the improvement of relations between nations".

In 1982, she founded the Oxford Research Group (ORG), an NGO that independently researched decision-making on security in the five major nuclear nations during and after the Cold War and brought together policy-makers, academics, the military and civil society to engage in dialogue with their critics. For this work, she was nominated three times for the Nobel Peace Prize, and in 2003 was awarded the Niwano Peace Prize. She remained the executive director of ORG until 2003.

In 2003, Elworthy stepped down as executive director of ORG to found a new charity, Peace Direct, which supports local peace-builders in conflict areas. Peace Direct was named "Best New Charity" at the London Charity Awards 2005 and, although she is not involved in the day-to-day running, Elworthy remains an Ambassador for Peace Direct.

In 2002, she launched a production at the Royal Opera House theatre in London entitled Transforming 11 September. In 2004, she provided the basic material for Max Stafford-Clark's production of Talking to Terrorists at the Royal Court Theatre in London; and in 2007 her case study on the siege of Fallujah in Iraq was used as the basis for Jonathan Holmes' production of Fallujah at the Old Truman Brewery in Brick Lane.

Her work for the World Peace Festival in 2011 included building seven achievable goals for the Global Peace Building Strategy, adopted by the World Peace Partnership. Dr Elworthy designed the programme for an international two-day conference on peacebuilding, the first day entitled "Peace is your business!" followed by a conference on the "Global Peace Building Strategy" including a morning of workshops entitled "Self Knowledge and Global Responsibility" featuring Dr Deepak Chopra. She and colleagues produced a booklet for the Festival entitled "Tools for Peace", with an accompanying video produced by TalkWorks in association with Different Films Ltd, presenting a seven-step process anyone can use to resolve conflict in the family, workplace or community.

In autumn 2007, Elworthy joined the EastWest Institute's International Task Force on Preventive Diplomacy; in 2009 was featured in the project Soldiers of Peace – Stories from 14 countries around the world – a documentary film narrated by Michael Douglas.

== The Elders ==
Although she has lectured extensively around the world and appeared on television and radio throughout the last 20 years, her work was less in the public eye from 2005 to 2009 as she was advising Richard Branson, Desmond Tutu and Peter Gabriel on the creation of The Elders, "an independent group of eminent global leaders, brought together by Nelson Mandela, who offer their collective influence and experience to support peace building, help address major causes of human suffering and promote the shared interests of humanity."

== 2011 to 2023 ==
Since the autumn of 2011, Dr Elworthy has been working on a course in consciousness and conflict transformation for mid career professionals, in association with Thomas Hübl in Berlin, Germany. She is patron of The GREAT Initiative Gender Rights and Equality Action Trust and a member of the International Advisory Council of the Institute for Economics and Peace; Voice of a Woman; Oxford Research Group; adviser to MasterPeace – an international bottom-up peace initiative – and a member of the steering Committee of PAX, a service to help prevent wars and genocides, and since the early 1990s, a member of the Society of Friends.

In 2012, Elworthy co-founded Rising Women Rising World, a community of women on all continents. The group consists of professionals from fields including economics, business, governance, security, health, ecology, media, culture and the arts, education, spirituality, and indigenous wisdom. The organization aims to develop future systems.

In 2013–14, Elworthy worked with a group of young social entrepreneurs at the DO School in Hamburg to raise awareness of the work of peace-builders worldwide. She remains involved with The DO School and its international development through her position as a board member.

In 2014, Elworthy published Pioneering the Possible: Awakened Leadership for a World that Works (North Atlantic Books, 2014).

In September 2017, she published The Business Plan for Peace: Building a World Without War (Peace Direct, 2017). The Business Plan for Peace demonstrates how 25 tried and tested strategies for preventing war could be scaled up and extended over 10 years, with the aim of preventing armed violence worldwide. The total cost came to as little as two billion dollars, when the cost of militarization worldwide now exceeds US$1,686 billion. The book further demonstrates how people in any country can learn the skills to prevent conflict and apply them in their own communities, schools, workplace and families. In 2020, she wrote The Mighty Heart: How to transform conflict which outlines the skills and techniques of conflict transformation. These skills were developed into an online course and in 2022, she wrote The Mighty Heart in Action which shows how they help people build a better world. Through Business Plan for Peace she advises the leadership of selected international corporations on investing in and strengthening their respective roles in preventing violent conflict, and teaches young social entrepreneurs.

Her TED Talk on non-violence has over 1.3 million views.

In 2023, she was awarded the GOI Peace Award in recognition of her lifelong dedication to prevent and transform conflicts and build sustainable peace throughout the world.

== Publications ==
Elworthy has written, edited and contributed to myriad reports, articles and books, including:

- 1986: Editor: How Nuclear Weapons Decisions Are Made (Macmillan, London)
- 1987: Author: Who Decides? Accountability and Nuclear Weapons Decision-Making in Britain, (Oxford Research Group).
- 1988: Producer: The Nuclear Weapons World: Who How and Where, (Pinter Publishers, London).
- 1989: Author: Parliament, the Public and NATO's Nuclear Weapons (Oxford Research Group).
- 1990: Co-author: New Threats and New Responses: proposals for future security decision-making in Europe, (Oxford Research Group).
- 1991: Co-author: Defence and Security in the New Europe: Who will decide? (Oxford Research Group).
- 1992: Editor: International control of the Arms Trade (Oxford Research Group).
- 1996 Editor and contributor: Re-thinking Defence and Foreign Policy (Spokesman Press, London).
- 1996: Author: Power & Sex (Element Books)
- 1997: Editor: Proposals for a Nuclear Weapon-Free World – a meeting between China and the West (Oxford Research Group).
- 2001: Co-author: The United States, Europe and the Majority World after 11 September (Oxford Research Group).
- 2001: Producer: War Prevention Works: 51 case studies of people resolving conflict (Oxford Research Group, Oxford).
- 2002 Co-author: A Never-Ending War? Consequences of 11 September (Oxford Research Group).
- 2002: Co-author: The 'War on Terrorism': 12-month audit and future strategy options (Oxford Research Group).
- 2001: Co-author: 9/11: What Should We Do Now? (Open Democracy).
- 2001: Author: Widening Atlantic (Open Democracy).
- 2002: Author: The Road Not Taken (Open Democracy).
- 2003: Author: The crisis over Iraq: the non-military solution (Open Democracy).
- 2003: Author: Waiting For The Dawn: A Bagdad Diary (Open Democracy).
- 2003: Author: Iraq: A Way Out? (Open Democracy).
- 2004: Author: Cutting the Costs of War: non-military prevention and resolution of conflict (Oxford Research Group).
- 2004: Author: Peacemaking At The Sharp End: Iraq Before & After War (Open Democracy).
- 2005: Author: Learning from Fallujah's Agony (Open Democracy).
- 2005: Author: Tackling Terror By Winning Hearts & Minds (Open Democracy).
- 2005: Co-author: Hearts and Minds: human security approaches to political violence (Demos, London).
- 2006: Author: If Diplomacy Fails (Open Democracy).
- 2006: Co-author: Making Terrorism History (Random House, London).
- 2009: Co-author: Soul Power (BookSurge).
- 2010: Tools For Peace (World Peace Partnership)
- 2010: "Is it time for a worldwide strategy for the building of peace?" (Open Democracy)
- 2011: "Peace can be planned. Just like health" (Open Democracy)
- 2011: Feast with your enemies – Dekha Ibrahim Abdi (Open Democracy)
- 2014: Pioneering the Possible: Awakened Leadership for a World That Works (North Atlantic Books)
- 2017: The Business Plan for Peace – Building a World Without War (Peace Direct)
- 2020: The Mighty Heart – How to transform conflict
- 2022: The Mighty Heart in Action

The reports produced by the Oxford Research Group are available from their website or, for the older reports, by contacting them directly.
