= Therapeutic community =

Group-based approach to therapy

Therapeutic community is a participative, group-based approach to long-term mental illness, personality disorders and drug addiction. The approach was usually residential, with the clients and therapists living together, but increasingly residential units have been superseded by day units. It is based on milieu therapy principles, and includes group psychotherapy as well as practical activities.

Therapeutic communities have gained some reputation for success in rehabilitation and patient satisfaction in Britain and other countries. In Britain, 'democratic analytic' therapeutic communities have tended to specialise in the treatment of moderate to severe personality disorders and complex emotional and interpersonal problems. The evolution of therapeutic communities in the United States has followed a different path with hierarchically arranged communities (or concept houses) specialising in the treatment of drug and alcohol dependence.

== History ==
=== Antecedents ===
There are several antecedents to the therapeutic community movement. One of the earliest is the change in treatment of institutionalised patients in the late 18th century, continuing throughout the 19th century. A major contributor to this change is Philippe Pinel, a French physician who advocated for a more humane treatment of psychiatric patients. In Britain William Tuke founded the Retreat where patients were treated according to humanitarian principles, called moral treatment. Tuke based the treatment of mentally ill people partly on the Quaker ideology. The influence of Quaker principles continues throughout the development of the therapeutic community.

Moral treatment focused on a more humane treatment of patients and a stimulating environment that engages them in healthy behaviour. An important distinction between the later therapeutic community is the strong hierarchy in moral treatment facilities. The superintendent had authority over and responsibility of the patients. The patients followed a strict schedule to promote obedience and self-control.

After the First World War, multiple varieties of living-and-learning communities for young adults were established. Examples are the Little Commonwealth school run by Homer Lane, the Q camps initiated by Marjorie Franklin, and Finchden Manor, founded by George Lyward. The Q camps were based on Planned Environmental Therapy, which focused on normally functioning parts of a patient's personality and use them to deal with difficult social situations. Lyward's work at Finchden Manor and its predecessor, provided from 1930 to 1973 what he called a 'type of hospitality' for emotionally troubled boys and young men of high intelligence. Finchden Manor operated without rules and sanctions, but there were traditions and expectations, backed up by what Lyward called 'stern love'. These projects all emphasized shared responsibility and decision-making and participation in the community. What influenced the establishment of these projects were, among others, the developments in psychoanalytic theory in Great-Britain.

=== United Kingdom ===
The work conducted by pioneering NZ plastic surgeon Arcihibald McIndoe at Queen Victoria Hospital and others at Northfield Military Hospital during World War II is considered by many psychiatrists to have been the first example of an intentional therapeutic community. But this story is prone to adopt a origin myth approach. The principles developed at Northfield were also developed and adapted at Civil Resettlement Units established at the end of the war to help returning prisoners of war to adapt back to civilian society and for civilians to adapt to having these men back amongst them.

The term was coined by Thomas Main in his 1946 paper, "The hospital as a therapeutic institution", and subsequently developed by others including Maxwell Jones, R. D. Laing at the Philadelphia Association, David Cooper at Villa 21, and Joshua Bierer.

Under the influence of Maxwell Jones, Main, Wilmer and others (Caudill 1958; Rapoport 1960), combined with the publications of critiques of the existing mental health system (Greenblatt et al. 1957, Stanton and Schwartz 1954) and the sociopolitical influences that permeated the psychiatric world towards the end of and following the Second World War, the concept of the therapeutic community and its attenuated form – the therapeutic milieu – caught on and dominated the field of inpatient psychiatry throughout the 1960s.

The first development of therapeutic community in a large institution took place at Claybury Hospital under the guidance of Denis Martin and John Pippard. Beginning in 1955 it involved over 2,000 patients and hundreds of staff. The aim of therapeutic communities was a more democratic, user-led form of therapeutic environment, avoiding the authoritarian and demeaning practices of many psychiatric establishments of the time. The central philosophy is that clients are active participants in their own and each other's mental health treatment and that responsibility for the daily running of the community is shared among the clients and the staff. One phrase commonly used to summarise this treatment philosophy is 'the Community as Doctor'. 'TC's have sometimes eschewed or limited medication in favor of group-based therapies.

The Henderson Hospital first established in 1947 by Maxwell Jones and named after David Henderson evolved the specific concept of Democratic Therapeutic Community (DTC). Admission to and early discharge from the one year of residential treatment was by majority vote and residents of the DTC always held the majority in these votes. No psychotropic medication or one to one therapy sessions were available and so all the work of the DTC was pursued, on the one hand, in small or larger therapy groups or work groups and community meetings, which could be called (by the residents) day or night; and on the other hand, in the unstructured time in between these more formal spaces, in which belonging in and membership of a living community could become in itself a healing experience. The Henderson Hospital DTC became an international centre of excellence for the care of survivors of severe trauma who did not fall under conventional psychiatric classifications and towards the end of the twentieth century it was funded to replicate the treatment model in two other DTCs: Main House in Birmingham and Webb House in Crewe.

The availability of the treatment on the National Health Service in the United Kingdom came under threat because of changes in funding systems. Researchers at the University of Oxford and King's College London studied one of these national Democratic Therapeutic Community services over four years and found external policy 'steering' by officials eroded the community's democratic model of care, which in turn destabilised its well established approach to clinical risk management (this had been jointly developed by clients and staff). Fischer (2012), who studied this community's development at first hand, described how an 'intractable conflict' between embedded and externally imposed management models led to escalating organizational 'turbulence', producing an interorganizational crisis which led to the unit's forced closure. The three 'Henderson' DTCs had all closed their doors by 2008.

However, development of 'mini' therapeutic communities, meeting for three or fewer days each week and supported out of hours by various forms of 'service user led informal networks of care' (for example telephone, texting and physical support), now offers a more resource and cost effective alternative to traditional inpatient therapeutic communities. The most recent exponent, the North Cumbria model, uses a dedicated out of hours website moderated by service users according to therapeutic community principles. This extends the community beyond the face to face 'therapeutic days'. The website guarantees a safe group-based response not always possible with other systems. The use of 'starter' groups as a preparation for entry into therapeutic communities has lowered attrition rates and they now represent a cost-effective model still aimed at producing durable personal and intergenerational effects; this is at odds with the current trend towards the defensive needs of service providers, rather than service users, for less intensive treatments and management of pathways to control risk.

=== United States ===
In the late 1960s within the US correctional system, the Asklepion Foundation initiated therapeutic communities in the Marion Federal Penitentiary and other institutions that included clinical intervention based upon Transactional Analysis, the Synanon Game, internal twelve-step programs and other therapeutic modalities. Some of these programs lasted into the mid-1980s, such as the House of Thought in the Virginia Correctional system, and were able to demonstrate a reduction of 17% in recidivism in a matched-pair study of drug-abusing felons and sex offenders who participated in the program for one year or more.

Modified therapeutic communities are currently used for substance abuse treatment in correctional facilities of several U.S. states including Pennsylvania, Washington, Colorado, Texas, Delaware, and New York. In New York City, a program for men is located in the Arthur Kill Correctional Facility on Staten Island and the women's program is part of the Bayview Correctional Facility in Manhattan.

== Main ideas ==
The therapeutic community approach aims to help patients deal with social situations and to change perceptions they have about themselves. Difficult situations are re-enacted and experienced and patients are encouraged to examine and try to learn from them with the help of group and individual therapy. The communities function as a living-and-learning situations, where every interaction can serve as a learning moment.

There is no encompassing definition of what a therapeutic community should be. Some have therefore also argued that it follows a family resemblance. A common conception of therapeutic community is a group of people living together in a non-hierarchical, democratic way that brings psychological awareness of individual as well as group processes. Furthermore, the community has clear boundaries of place, time and roles of the participants. They are democratic because the patients are involved in decision-making to encourage a sense of responsibility. This is fostered by the non-hierarchical structure that tries to minimise dependency on the staff.

A key principle is the creation of a culture of enquiry. Everyone within the community is encouraged to reflect and ask question about themselves and others. In this way the participants are supported by continuous feedback to create better self-awareness.

The therapeutic community approach is informed by systems theory, organisation theory and psychoanalytic practice.

== Effectiveness ==
As an intervention model for drug-using offenders with co-occurring mental health disorders, therapeutic communities may help people reduce drug use and subsequent criminal activity. Research evidence for the effectiveness of therapeutic community treatment is substantial and a demonstration of the cost efficacy of a year of residential therapeutic community treatment was instrumental in funding being granted in the late 1990s for the replication of the Henderson Hospital DTC.

== In popular culture ==
- The Alfred Hitchcock film Spellbound takes place within a therapeutic community called Green Manors.
- Leonard Cohen and his touring band The Army gave an impromptu concert at the Henderson Hospital DTC in August 1970, just before the Isle of Wight Festival, after being invited by one of the residents.
