= Group analysis =

Method of group psychotherapy

Group analysis (or group analytic psychotherapy) is a method of group psychotherapy originated by S. H. Foulkes in the 1940s. Group psychotherapy was pioneered by S. H. Foulkes with his psychoanalytic patients and later with soldiers in the Northfield experiments at Hollymoor Hospital. Group analysis combines psychoanalytic insights with an understanding of social and interpersonal functioning. There is an interest, in group analysis, on the relationship between the individual group member and the rest of the group resulting in a strengthening of both, and a better integration of the individual with his or her community, family and social network.

Deriving from psychoanalysis, Group Analysis also draws on a range of other psychotherapeutic traditions and approaches: systems theory psychotherapies, developmental psychology and social psychology. Group analysis also has applications in organisational consultancy, and in teaching and training. Group analysts work in a wide range of contexts with a wide range of difficulties and problems.

== Method ==
Group analysis is based on the view that deep lasting change can occur within a carefully formed group whose combined membership reflects the wider norms of society. Group analysis is a way of understanding group processes in small, median or, large groups. It is concerned with the relationship between a person and the network of activity in the many groups of which he or she might belong. Through these group processes we can explore what bearing the public and private aspects of a person’s life have on one another, and the dialectic between group and personal development. Group members are supported, through shared experience and joint exploration within the group, in coming to a healthier understanding of their situation. Problems are seen at the level of group, organisation or institutional system; not solely in the individual sufferer, as they do in prevailing medical models. Problems within are recast as obstacles without. The way in which the group functions is central to this. Democracy and co-operation are the pillars through which group-mediated solutions to problems can flow in ways that are enduring. It is based on the principles developed by S.H. Foulkes in the 1940s and is rooted in psychoanalysis and the social sciences.

Group analysis is the dominant psychodynamic approach outside the United States and Canada. It is an approach that views the group as an organic entity and insists that the therapist take a less intrusive role, so as to become the group's conductor (as in music) rather than its director. The group is seen as not merely a dynamic entity of its own, but functions within a sociocultural context that influences its processes. In group analytic technique, the therapist weans the members from excessive and inappropriate dependency towards becoming their own therapists – both to themselves and to the other group members.

The Group Analytic Society and the Institute of Group Analysis were organisations established by Foulkes and others to promote Group Analysis and to train practitioners.
