= S. H. Foulkes =

German-British psychiatrist and psychoanalyst

Sigmund Henry Foulkes
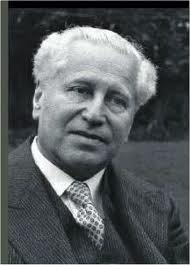
- Born: Siegmund Heinrich Fuchs; 3 September 1898; Karlsruhe, German Empire
- Died: 8 July 1976 (aged 77); London, England
- Other name: Michael
- Education: Heidelberg University, Ludwig-Maximilians-Universität München, Goethe University Frankfurt, Vienna Psychoanalytic Society
- Occupations: Medical practitioner, psychoanalyst, group analyst, trainer
- Employer: St Bartholomew's Hospital
- Known for: Pioneer in Group psychology and Group analysis
- Spouse(s): Erna Foulkes (née Stavenhagen) (1923–1937), Kilmeny (Kim) Foulkes (née Graham) (1938–1959), Elizabeth Therese Fanny Foulkes (née Marx) (1960)
- Children: 3

S. H. Foulkes (/fʊks/ FUUKS; born Siegmund Heinrich Fuchs; 3 September 1898 – 8 July 1976) was a German-British psychiatrist and psychoanalyst. He developed a theory of group behaviour that led to his founding of group analysis, a variant of group therapy. He initiated the Group Analytic Society, and the Institute of Group Analysis (IGA) in London. In 1933, owing to his Jewish and Welsh descent, Foulkes immigrated to England. In 1938, he was granted British citizenship and changed his name to S. H. Foulkes.

== Background ==
Foulkes was born in Karlsruhe. He studied medicine at Heidelberg University, the Ludwig-Maximilians-Universität München and Goethe University Frankfurt, where he graduated in 1923. He undertook further studies in psychiatry with Otto Pötzl in Vienna and in neurology with Kurt Goldstein, whose assistant he was for two years. During that time he first encountered Gestalt psychology which influenced his later work with groups. His interest in psychological problems led him to Freud's writings and ultimately to a training analysis in Vienna with Helene Deutsch. His training supervisor was Hermann Nunberg. As part of his schooling he attended seminars led by Wilhelm Reich. In 1930, he joined the newly formed Frankfurt Psychoanalytic Institute, where he was appointed the director of the Clinic. He shared the building with the famous Institute for Social Research with whose members he came into contact and who at that time included, Max Horkheimer, Theodor W. Adorno, Erich Fromm and Herbert Marcuse. He was, besides, a personal friend of the sociologist, Norbert Elias, and their collaboration would later become a profound influence on his therapeutic concepts. Among others, he drew from him basic concepts like the primary socialisation of the individual, his need to belong to a group and his attachment to a transpersonal and cultural matrix.

After Hitler came to power, it was at the invitation of Ernest Jones that he travelled to London via Paris and settled in England in 1933 as a refugee with his wife Erna and their three children and continued to work, becoming a training analyst. To do this he had to obtain a British medical qualification and membership of the British Psycho-Analytical Society. In this he was helped by Ernest Jones.

== Group analysis ==
He moved to Exeter in 1939 where he became a psychoanalyst in a large psychiatric practice and conducted his first group-analytic psychotherapy group. He was called up in autumn 1940 and at the same time hit upon the idea of asking patients gathered in the waiting room to free-associate. He was posted in the rank of major to the Military Neurosis Centre at Northfield in 1942 where he took part in developing a range of innovative treatments, many of them group based, and pioneered both group analytic and therapeutic community methods.

After the War he resumed his psychoanalytic practice and analytic groups in his private practice. Once recognised as a training analyst by the Freudian B Group at the London Institute he was appointed to St Bartholomew's Hospital where he worked until his retirement in 1963 alongside his practice in individual psychoanalysis and group analysis. He continued in private practice after his retirement.

Foulkes had interests in neurology, psychiatry, sociology, and psychology. His work with groups at Northfield Hospital (UK) contributed to his founding of the Group Analytic Society (GAS) in 1952 in London and attracting an international membership. He was later instrumental in starting the Institute of Group Analysis (IGA) in 1971 for training practitioners. Both the GAS and the IGA have spawned numerous related professional associations and training bodies in the UK and several other countries. There are now trainings in Scandinavia, Germany, Italy, Greece, Ireland, Poland, Portugal and Russia as well as a number of training centres in the UK.

Foulkes regarded groups as basic to human existence, all individuals being born into social groups (families, cultures, societies) that shape the lifespan continuously in conscious and less conscious ways. As a form of psychotherapy, Group analysis, values communication and relationship, dialogue and exchange. It privileges the analysis of current relationships and dynamics within the group as the focus of psychotherapeutic work. For friends and family he used the nickname 'Michael'. S. H. Foulkes died suddenly, during a seminar, from a coronary thrombosis in 1976, aged 77.

== Legacy ==
In his practice Foulkes combined psychoanalytic models with sociological concepts about human groups. He trained hundreds of psychiatrists as Group therapists and had a much broader influence through his numerous publications.

== Selected publications ==
- Foulkes, S. H. and Parkin, Alan (1957). Out-Patient Psychotherapy : a Contribution Towards a New Approach. International Journal of Social Psychiatry, 3: 44 - 48.
- Foulkes, S. H. (1964). Therapeutic group analysis. Reprinted 1984. London: Karnac Books.
- Foulkes, S. H. (1968). On interpretation in group analysis. International J. Group Psychotherapy, 18, 432–434.
- Foulkes, S. H. and Ledbetter, V. (1969) A Note On Transference in Groups. Group Analysis, 135–146.
- Foulkes, S. H. (1971) Access To Unconscious Processes in the Group Analytic Group. Group Analysis, 4; vol. 4: pp. 4 – 14.
- Foulkes, S. H. (1972). Oedipus conflict and regression. International J. Group Psychotherapy, 22, 3–15.
- Foulkes, S. H. (1975). Qualification as a Psychoanalyst as an Asset as Well as a Hindrance for the Future Group Analyst. Group Analysis, 10, vol. 8: pp. 180 – 182.
- Foulkes, S. H. (1975). A Short Outline of the Therapeutic Processes in Group-Analytic Psychotherapy. Group Analysis, 2; vol. 8: pp. 60 – 63.
- Foulkes, S. H. (1975). Some personal observations. International J. Group Psychotherapy, 25, 169–172.
- Foulkes, S. H. (1983). Introduction to Group-Analytic Psychotherapy: Studies in the Social Integration of Individuals and Groups. Maresfield Reprints.
- Foulkes, S. H. (1990). Selected Papers of S.H. Foulkes: Psychoanalysis and Group Analysis. Edited by Elizabeth Foulkes. Karnac Books.
