= Hollymoor Hospital =

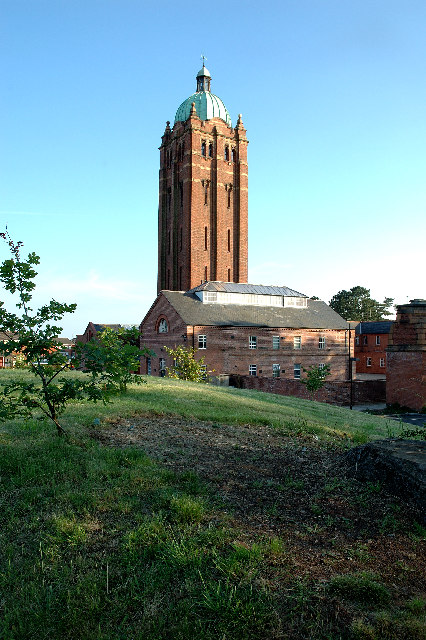
- The Water Tower, Hollymoor Hospital, Northfield, Birmingham

- Location within West Midlands

Geography
- Location: Northfield, West Midlands, England, United Kingdom
- Coordinates: 52.4044°N 1.9968°W

Organisation
- Care system: NHS England
- Type: Mental health

History
- Founded: 1905
- Closed: 1994

Links
- Lists: Hospitals in England

Hollymoor Hospital was a psychiatric hospital located at Tessall Lane, Northfield in Birmingham, England, and is famous primarily for the work on group psychotherapy that took place there in the years of the Second World War. It closed in 1994.

== History ==
=== Construction and expansion ===
The hospital, which was designed by William Martin and Frederick Martin using a Compact Arrow layout, was built as an annexe to Rubery Lunatic Asylum by Birmingham Corporation and opened 6 May 1905. During the First World War, Hollymoor was commandeered and became known as the 2nd Birmingham War Hospital.

=== The Northfield experiments ===
During the Second World War, the hospital was again converted to a military hospital in 1940. In April 1942 it became a military psychiatric hospital and became known as Northfield Military Hospital. In 1942, while Northfield was serving as a military hospital, psychoanalysts Wilfred Bion and John Rickman set up the first Northfield experiment. Bion and Rickman were in charge of the training and rehabilitation wing of Northfield, and ran the unit along the principles of group dynamics. Their aim was to improve morale by creating a "good group spirit" (esprit de corps). Though he sounded like a traditional army officer Bion's means were very unconventional. He was in charge of around one hundred men. He told them that they had to do an hour's exercise every day and that each had to join a group: "handicrafts, Army courses, carpentry, map-reading, sand-tabling etc.... or form a fresh group if he wanted to do so". While this may have looked like traditional occupational therapy, the real therapy was the struggle to manage the interpersonal strain of organising things together, rather than simply weaving baskets. Those unable to join a group would have to go to the rest-room, where a nursing orderly would supervise a quiet regime of "reading, writing or games such as draughts... any men who felt unfit for any activity whatever could lie down". The focus of every day was a meeting of all the men, referred to as a parade.

".. a parade would be held every day at 12.10 p.m. for making announcements and conducting other business of the training wing. Unknown to the patients, it was intended that this meeting, strictly limited to 30 minutes, should provide an occasion for the men to step outside their framework and look upon its working with the detachment of spectators. In short it was intended to be the first step towards the elaboration of therapeutic seminars. For the first few days little happened; but it was evident that amongst patients a great deal of discussion and thinking was taking place"

The experiment had to close after six weeks as the military authorities did not approve of it and ordered the transfer of Bion and Rickman (who were members of the Royal Army Medical Corps). The second Northfield experiment, which was based on the ideas of Bion and Rickman and used group psychotherapy, was started the following year by Siegmund Foulkes, who was more successful at gaining the support of the military authorities. One of the military psychiatrists involved in the project was Lt. Col. T.F. Main, who coined the term therapeutic community, and saw the potential of the experiments in the development of future therapeutic communities.

Northfield Military Hospital was the setting for Sheila Llewellyn's novel Walking Wounded, published in 2018.

=== Decline and closure ===
Poet Vernon Scannell was a patient at the hospital in 1947. By 1949 Hollymoor Hospital was recognisably distinct from Rubery Hill Hospital. It held 590 patients, falling slowly to 490 by 1984, and then dropping rapidly to 139 by 1994. After the introduction of Care in the Community in the early 1980s, the hospital went into a period of decline and closed in July 1994. It was subsequently largely demolished.
