= Agazarian =

Agazarian is a surname. Notable people with the surname include:

- Francine Agazarian (1913–1999), French Resistance member
- Jack Agazarian (1915–1945), British spy
- Monique Agazarian (1920–1993), English pilot
- Noel Agazarian (1916–1941), British World War II flying ace
- Yvonne Agazarian (1929–2017), British-American psychologist
