= Spotniz =

Spotniz is a surname. Notable people with the surname include:

- Frank Spotnitz (born 1960), American television writer and producer
- Henry Spotnitz, American surgeon
- Hyman Spotnitz (1908–2008), American psychoanalyst and psychiatrist
- William D. Spotnitz, American surgeon and medical researcher
