= Louis Ormont =

American psychologist

- Born: 1918
- Died: November 15, 2008 (aged 89–90)
- Education: National Psychological Association for Psychoanalysis
- Alma mater: Temple University (BA); Yale School of Drama (MFA); Columbia University (PhD)
- Known for: Pioneer of modern group psychotherapy based on a psychoanalytic model
- Scientific career
- Fields: Psychology, group psychotherapy, psychoanalysis
- Workplaces: Adelphi University, Center for Modern Psychoanalytic Studies, Center for Group Studies

Louis Ormont (1918 – November 15, 2008) was an American psychologist and one of the earliest practitioners of group psychotherapy based on a psychoanalytic model.

== Education ==
Ormont earned a BA from Temple University, an MFA from the Yale School of Drama, and a PhD from the Columbia University clinical psychology program. He also received training at the National Psychological Association for Psychoanalysis.

== Career and life's work ==
At the beginning of his career in 1942 there were fewer than 20 people who identified themselves as group therapists. Ormont studied group psychotherapy with Alexander Wolf, Asya Kadis, Fritz Perls, and Hyman Spotnitz, with whom he worked for more than 45 years. In 1960, he switched to an all-group private practice, the first psychotherapist to do so. In 1964, he and two co-authors Morton M. Hunt and Rena Corman published the book “The Talking Cure: A Concise and Practical Guide to Psychoanalysis Today” which aimed to educate readers about psychoanalysis, explaining not only technical terms but presenting the material in a panel format with four composite characters representing clients interacting with a fictional psychotherapist.

In 1974, he was appointed clinical professor of psychology at Adelphi University’s Gordon Werner Institute of Advanced Psychological Studies and was the founder of the Center for Modern Psychoanalytic Studies. In 1989, Ormont and colleagues who had benefited from his work founded the Center for Group Studies (CGS). CGS is an independent educational institution in New York City focused on teaching group leadership skills to both therapists and non-therapists.

He was also a prolific playwright who produced more than fifty manuscripts for the stage, television, and films.

== Group therapy expertise ==
Ormont's group therapy expertise lay in navigating complex interpersonal dynamics of his group members and supporting them as they faced resistance to their feelings, without forcing them to confront them directly. His ability to help individuals find the right words to unlock this resistance played a key role in helping them foster deeper understanding and insight. Ormont believed that if people could tune into their own feelings they would more skillfully navigate their interactions with others and themselves rather than heading on a negative track. He noted the advantages of group therapy included that groups created the conditions for people to act out and become aware of unhealthy behaviors and see how others responded to them. It also allowed for people to try out new behaviors.

In his 1992 book “The Group Therapy Experience: From Theory to Practice” he published a comprehensive guide to how group therapy is practiced. He shared his theoretical understanding of group therapy and provided a more concrete explanation of its major concepts which was noted to be understandable by both laypersons as well as therapists. He discussed the concepts of resistance, transference, and countertransference, with resistances noted as subtle yet desirable. When resistances manifest in a group setting, the therapist can help the client understand and change their behavior. He proposed a three-part standard to ensure productive group therapy sessions and to help the therapist effectively assess the group's progress. This standard enabled the therapist to recognize when the group was on track or when something was going wrong and required intervention. The standard consists of three key points: (1) members must verbalize their emotions, (2) their expressed feelings should be directed toward one another, and (3) the communication must be progressive, revealing new emotions. Any deviation from this is seen as resistance.

== Awards and recognition ==
- Group Psychologist of the Year award from the American Psychological Association (1998)
- Distinguished Fellow of the American Group Psychotherapy Association (AGPA) (2000)

== Bibliography ==
Ormont actively published papers from 1958 through 2004 in the American Journal of Psychotherapy, The British Journal of Medical Psychology, Marriage and Family Living, The Psychoanalytic Review, American Journal of Psychiatry, other journals, and the following books:

- Hunt, Morton M.; Corman, Rena; Ormont, Louis R. (1964). The Talking Cure: A Concise and Practical Guide to Psychoanalysis Today. New York: Harper & Row.
- Ormont, Louis R.; Strean, Herbert S. (1978). The Practice of Conjoint Therapy: Combining individual and Group Treatment. Human Sciences Press. ISBN 978-0877053552.
- Ormont, Louis R. (1992). The Group Therapy Experience: From Theory to Practice. New York: St. Martin’s Press. ISBN 978-0312070366.
- Ormont, Louis R. (2001). Furgeri, Lena Blanco (ed.). The Technique of Group Treatment: The Collected Papers of Louis R. Ormont. Madison, Connecticut: Psychosocial Press. ISBN 978-1887841351.
