= Samuel Slavson =

American engineer and journalist (1890–1981)

Samuel Richard Slavson (December 25, 1890 – August 5, 1981) was an American engineer, journalist and teacher, who began to engage in group analysis in 1919. He is considered one of the pioneers of group psychotherapy for his contributions to its recognition as a scientific discipline. Slavson wrote over 20 books and served as the founding president of the American Group Psychotherapy Association (AGPA). He also established children's group therapy and developed a specific small group model.

== Life and work ==
Slavson, born Amstislavski, came to New York in 1903 after escaping the Ukrainian pogroms. Early on, he became involved in self-culture clubs for children and young people. While studying to become a civil engineer, he developed youth support programs, because he believed there was inherent creative potential in every human being. He sympathized with the ideas of progressive education and Freud's theories, as well as the child guidance movement. He was also a part of the Jewish Board of Guardians in New York, a care centre for girls and boys with developmental disabilities, where he worked from 1934 to 1956. In 1934, he was able to start proving the efficacy of group work with emotional disorders.

In 1943, Slavson published An introduction to Group Therapy, the first and fundamental work on the use of group psychotherapy with children and youth. This work gained wide recognition and was for instance ranked by the Menninger Foundation among the 10 Classics of Psychotherapy. He was a founding member and the first President of the AGPA, which was keen to be well-recognized by psychiatrists; all of the 12 direct successors of the non-medical practitioner Slavson were in fact psychiatrists. Moreover, Slavson - who still exerted substantial influence in the organization after the end of his presidency in 1940 - strictly ensured that the institution remained classically Freudian, orthodox and in a clear defensive position to Neo-Freudians, existentialists and transactional analysts. Slavson worked as a teacher, supervisor and de facto editor of the International Journal of Group Psychology, at both the national and international level. His was involved in a decades-long controversy and rivalry with Jacob L. Moreno, the founder of psychodrama.

According to Stumm et al. (1992), "Slavson justified the recognition of group psychotherapy as a scientific discipline, provided fundamental theoretical contributions to this end and established a professional organization in the United States, which laid out binding guidelines for qualified training for the first time."

== Children's group psychotherapy ==
Slavson is considered the founder of children's group psychotherapy. He saw games as methods of therapy and used modelling clay, puppet theaters and building blocks. He believed that by these means, children would develop their social skills and strengthen their community spirit. He said that children can change their behavior while in a group of peers, believing that an otherwise quiet child becomes more open and bold and that a loud child becomes more reserved. He believed children would be able to relate to each other's problems. Through the group, according to Slavson, a feeling of unity can be created and a sense of identity can become strengthened. Developmentally, he thought this is particularly important for children aged 6 to 7 years.

== Small group model ==
After decades of work with children and young people, in the late 1940s Slavson started working with adults as well. His small group model is designed for a maximum of 8 participants and is based on groups homogeneous in terms of age, sex and symptoms. Slavson developed several disorder-specific models, with exact descriptions for clinical use. Distinctions were made between counseling, guidance and psychotherapy. His parent groups around child welfare were particularly well known as well as vita-erg therapy with psychotic women.

In 1964, Slavson put forward a summary of his theoretical developments and practical experience in the volume A Textbook in Analytic Group Psychotherapy. He combined Freud's theory of psychosexual development with terms from the field of sociology and recognized the human search for relationships and acceptance as a primary need. He saw the group as an "I (ego) therapy" within a collective "we-superego", which opens up a path out of selfishness and psychological isolation. He is credited for synthesizing the principles of the founding generation of psychoanalytical theory with the requirements of American psychiatry.

== Awards ==
- 1969 Award from the American Academy of Psychotherapists
- 1972 Father of group psychotherapy

== In the media ==
- A. Klein: He lets them grow. Survey 85 (1949): 75-80
- Hyman Spotnitz: In tribute to S.R.Slavson. Intern' Journal of Group Psychotherapy 21 (1971): 402-405
- Scheidlinger/Schamess: Fifty years of AGPA 1942–1992: An overview. Intern' Journal of Group Psychotherapy 42 (1992): 1-22
