= John Beeley =

Recipient of the Victoria Cross

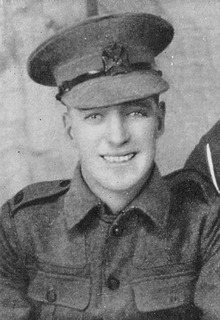
- Born: 8 February 1918; Manchester, England
- Died: 21 November 1941 (aged 23); Sidi Rezegh, Italian Libya
- Burial place: Knightsbridge War Cemetery, Acroma
- Military career
- Allegiance: United Kingdom
- Branch: British Army
- Service years: 1938−1941
- Rank: Rifleman
- Service number: 6846197
- Units: King's Royal Rifle Corps
- Conflicts: Second World War: North African campaign; Western Desert campaign; Operation Crusader; Battle of Sidi Rezegh †
- Awards: Victoria Cross

Rifleman John Beeley VC (8 February 1918 – 21 November 1941) was a British Army soldier and an English recipient of the Victoria Cross (VC), the highest and most prestigious award for gallantry in the face of the enemy that can be awarded to British and Commonwealth forces.

Beeley was 23 years old, and a rifleman in the 1st Battalion, King's Royal Rifle Corps, British Army during Operation Crusader in the Second World War when the following deed took place for which he was awarded the VC.

On 21 November 1941 at Sidi Rezegh, Libya, at an airfield being attacked by Rifleman Beeley's company, progress was held up by short range fire. All the officers of the company were wounded so, on his own initiative the rifleman ran forward over open ground, firing his Bren gun and at 20 yards range put an anti-tank gun and two machine-guns out of action. He was killed but his bravery inspired his comrades to further efforts to reach their objective, which was eventually captured, together with 700 prisoners.

He is buried in the Knightsbridge War Cemetery, Acroma, Libya. His Victoria Cross is displayed at the Royal Green Jackets (Rifles) Museum in Winchester, England. A street in Openshaw, Manchester, has been named John Beeley Avenue in his honour.
