= Centre for Group Studies =

American nonprofit organization

The Center for Group Studies was founded in 1989 to provide group leadership for professionals in the fields of mental health, business, education, religion and the arts. The programs are designed around the principles and techniques of Louis Ormont, Ph.D., an international leader in modern analytic group therapy.
