= George Salvidge =

English footballer

Personal information
- Full name: George Brown Salvidge
- Date of birth: December 1919
- Place of birth: Bridlington, England
- Date of death: 23 November 1941 (aged 21)
- Place of death: Tobruk, Libya
- Position: Winger

Senior career*
Years	Team	Apps	(Gls)
1934	Southcoates Lane Old Boys		
1935	Beverley White Star		
1936–1939	Hull City	4	(1)
1939	Burton Town		
- * Club domestic league appearances and goals

George Brown Salvidge (December 1919 – 23 November 1941) was an English professional footballer who played as a winger in the Football League for Hull City.

== Personal life ==
Salvidge served as a lance corporal in the York and Lancaster Regiment during the Second World War. He was killed at Tobruk on 23 November 1941 and was buried at the Knightsbridge War Cemetery, Acroma.

== Career statistics ==
Appearances and goals by club, season and competition
Club	Season	Division	League		FA Cup		Total	
Club	Season	Division	Apps	Goals	Apps	Goals	Apps	Goals
Hull City	1938–39	Third Division North	4	1	0	0	4	1
Career total			4	1	0	0	4	1
