= Yvonne Agazarian =

American psychologist (1929-2017)

- Born: February 17, 1929; London, UK
- Died: October 9, 2017 (aged 88); Philadelphia, USA
- Education: Temple University
- Known for: systems-centered therapy
- Partner: Berj Philibossian
- Relatives: Noel Agazarian (brother); Monique Agazarian (sister); Jack Agazarian (brother); Francine Agazarian (sister-in-law)
- Scientific career
- Fields: psychotherapy, group therapy
- Workplaces: American Group Psychotherapy Association

Yvonne M. Agazarian (February 17, 1929 - October 9, 2017) was the principal architect of systems-centered therapy, based on a theory of Living Human Systems that she also developed. Agazarian taught, trained, and supervised systems-centered therapists internationally, was the founder of the Systems-Centered Training & Research Institute, and practiced in Philadelphia, Pennsylvania.

== Life ==
Agazarian was born in London to a French mother and Armenian father, the youngest of six children. She attended a Jesuit boarding school, the Convent of the Sacred Heart in Roehampton, from the ages of 7–17. After the end of the Second World War, she moved to Canada to study English and philosophy, supporting herself through work as a nurse in a mental hospital, and as a cook in a logging camp. It was there she became pregnant with her first son, Jack. After separating with her Canadian husband, she returned first to England, then in 1960 moved to Philadelphia, in order to better support her son, who was born blind.

While in Philadelphia, Agazarian completed a PhD in the field of group dynamics at Temple University, entitled A Theory of Verbal Behaviour and Information Transfer. It was at Temple where she first developed an interest in bridging the lack of common language between group dynamics and psychoanalysis. She qualified as a therapist at the Psychoanalytic Studies Institute in Philadelphia.

In 1995, she founded the Systems-Centered Training and Research Institute, based in Philadelphia, which continues to develop systems-centered therapy, and with whom she worked until her death in 2017.

== Theoretical Orientation ==
Agazarian had from the sixties been interested in the paradigm clash presented by her training in individual psychotherapy and in group therapy, and in the possibility of overcoming it: from the eighties onwards, she explored the possibility of resolving it through general systems theory.

It was, however, the challenge presented in the following decade by health maintenance organizations and their stress on short-term therapy, that propelled her into devising systems-centered therapy, in order (she stated) to discover "how to think about short-term therapy in a way that maintained the integrity and values of our work".

The influences she credited on her work range from W. R. Bion and John Bowlby to Erwin Schrödinger and Ludwig von Bertalanffy, reflecting both her intellectual range and the trajectory of her movement from psychoanalysis through whole-group therapy to systems-centered therapy.

== Awards and achievements ==
In 1997, the American Psychological Association awarded her Group Psychologist of the Year "for her involvement in research, publication, teaching and training. She exemplifies the finest in scholarship in the discipline of psychology. As a group psychologist, she has contributed to expanding our knowledge of the boundaries between clinical and social psychology with the investigation of living human systems and systems-centered group and individual therapy. Her considerable body of work illustrates the highest blend of creativity and learning".

== Selected works ==
- The Visible and Invisible Group, with Richard Peters, 1981
- Systems-Centered Therapy for Groups, 1997
- Systems-centered practice: Selected papers on group psychotherapy, 2006

== See also ==
- Intensive short-term dynamic psychotherapy
- Group psychotherapy
