= James Smith (RAF officer) =

Canadian flying ace of WWII

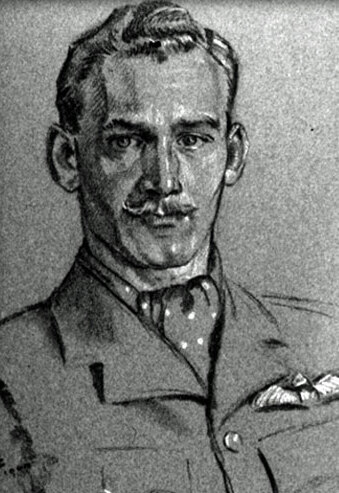
- Portrait of Smith, made by the war artist Cuthbert Orde in 1940
- Born: 17 March 1914; Winnipeg, Canada
- Died: 14 April 1941 (aged 27) †; Tobruk, Libya
- Military career
- Allegiance: Canada
- Branch: Royal Canadian Air Force (1934–1937); Royal Air Force (1937–1941)
- Rank: Flight Lieutenant
- Nickname: 'Smudger'
- Commands: No. 87 Squadron; No. 73 Squadron
- Conflicts: Second World War: Phoney War; Battle of France; Battle of Britain; Siege of Tobruk
- Awards: Mention in Dispatches

James Smith (17 March 1914 – 14 April 1941) was a Canadian flying ace who served in the Royal Air Force (RAF) during the Second World War. He is credited with having destroyed eight aircraft.

From Winnipeg, Smith served in the Royal Canadian Air Force from 1934 to 1937 before he joined the RAF on a short service commission. Posted to No. 87 Squadron in July 1938, he was with the unit when it was sent to France following the outbreak of the Second World War. Shortly after the invasion of France in May 1940, he was posted to No. 73 Squadron and claimed his first aerial victory in early June. More success followed during the Battle of Britain. In late 1940 the squadron was sent to the Middle East. On 14 April 1941, while flying a sortie during the Siege of Tobruk, Smith was killed in action. He received a posthumous Mention in Dispatches in the 1942 New Year Honours.

== Early life ==
James Duncan Smith was born in Winnipeg, Canada, on 17 March 1914 to Scottish immigrants. He was educated locally before going onto St. John's Technical College. Once he completed his schooling in 1930, he worked as a labourer but served part-time in the Canadian Militia with the Winnipeg Light Infantry. In 1934 he joined the Royal Canadian Air Force (RCAF) as an apprentice. However, in September 1937, Smith, who was nicknamed 'Smudger', left the RCAF to join the Royal Air Force on a short service commission.

After his initial training was completed, in late November Smith was granted his commission as an acting pilot officer on probation. He proceeded to No. 10 Flying Training School at Tern Hill the following month. In July 1938 Smith was posted to No. 87 Squadron. This was based at Debden and in the process of converting to the Hawker Hurricane fighter. Smith was confirmed in his rank as pilot officer in September.

== Second World War ==
On the outbreak of the Second World War, No. 87 Squadron was sent to France as part of the Air Component of the British Expeditionary Force. It saw little action during the Phoney War. Smith, newly promoted to flying officer, returned to the United Kingdom in early May 1940 to briefly attend No. 6 Operational Training Unit, and towards the end of the month was posted to No. 73 Squadron. This unit, equipped with Hurricanes, was in France and heavily engaged in the fighting there following the 10 May invasion of the country. As the campaign progressed, the squadron withdrew into the south west of France. On 5 June Smith was one of three pilots to combine in the shooting down of a Dornier Do 17 medium bomber. No. 73 Squadron was withdrawn to the United Kingdom later in the month.

=== Battle of Britain ===
After a period of rebuilding at Church Fenton, No. 73 Squadron returned to operational flying as a night fighter unit in July. On 11 September Smith destroyed one Messerschmitt Bf 110 heavy fighter, and damaged a second, to the north of Herne Bay. Four days later, on what became Battle of Britain Day, the squadron was scrambled to intercept a large incoming Luftwaffe raid. In the resulting engagement, Smith shot down a Messerschmitt Bf 109 fighter in the vicinity of Eastchurch. Later in the month, the squadron relocated to Castle Camps from where it operated as part of the night defences of London. It soon began preparing for a move overseas to the Middle East and departed the United Kingdom in mid-November.

=== North Africa ===
Transported to Sekondi-Takoradi in West Africa aboard the aircraft carrier HMS Furious, the squadron's pilots made a cross-country flight with their Hurricanes to Egypt at the end of November. Smith was briefly attached to No. 274 while his own unit prepared to become operational. On 14 December he destroyed a Savoia-Marchetti SM.79 medium bomber over Bardia. Two days later he shot down another SM79 and also probably destroyed a Fiat CR.42 biplane fighter, both in the vicinity of Bardia. Smith achieved the destruction of a reconnaissance variant of the SM79 near Gambut on 18 December. At the start of 1941, No. 73 Squadron became operational and was engaged in patrol duties over Bardia. From March, it was based in Tobruk and became engaged in the aerial defence of the city. On 14 April Smith became engaged in a dogfight with several Fiat G.50 fighters over Tobruk. After destroying two of them, and damaging a third, he was shot down and killed.

Smith, who was an acting flight lieutenant at the time of his death, received a posthumous Mention in Dispatches in the 1942 New Year Honours. He is buried at the Commonwealth War Graves Commission's Knightsbridge War Cemetery at Acroma in Libya.

Smith is credited with the destruction of eight aircraft, one of which was shared with two other pilots, and two damaged. He is also credited with the probable destruction of one aircraft.
