= David Coke =

British RAF aviator and officer

The Honourable David Coke DFC
- Born: 4 December 1915; Norfolk, England
- Died: 9 December 1941 (aged 26); Acroma, Libya
- Burial place: Knightsbridge War Cemetery, Acroma
- Military career
- Allegiance: United Kingdom
- Branch: Royal Air Force
- Service years: 1939–1941
- Rank: Flight lieutenant
- Conflicts: Second World War: Battle of Britain; Balkans campaign; Syria–Lebanon campaign; Battle of Athens †
- Awards: Distinguished Flying Cross

Flight Lieutenant David Arthur Coke (/ˈkʊk/ KUUK; (Note: The family name was pronounced in the same way as the name "Cook".) 4 December 1915 – 9 December 1941) was a British aristocrat who served in the Royal Air Force Volunteer Reserve during the Second World War, and is credited with two destroyed, two probables, and two damaged aircraft during his service. He is known in popular culture for his friendship with the author Roald Dahl while serving in the Royal Air Force.

== Early life and family ==
The second son of Thomas Coke, 4th Earl of Leicester, and Marion Gertrude (née Trefusis), Coke was godson of King Edward VIII of the United Kingdom. He was a graduate of Trinity College, Cambridge.

== Second World War ==
Coke joined the Royal Air Force Volunteer Reserve (RAFVR) in June 1939, the summer before war broke out, and attended No. 5 Operational Training Unit in April 1940. He was promoted to the rank of acting pilot officer on 3 September 1940. By August 1940 he flew a Hawker Hurricane with No. 257 Squadron RAF during the Battle of Britain as a pilot officer. On 12 August 1940, his Hurricane (P3776) was badly shot up over the English Channel off Portsmouth. His finger was amputated and the aircraft was repaired. Posted to 46 Squadron in December 1940, Coke was then promoted to flying officer.

He went on to fight in the Balkans campaign with No. 33 Squadron and the Syria–Lebanon campaign with No. 80 Squadron RAF. During this period with No. 80 squadron, he became friends with famed author Roald Dahl, as detailed in Dahl's autobiography Going Solo. Dahl described Coke (pronounced "Cook", he said) as:

. . . warm-hearted and brave and generous, and over the next few weeks we were to become close friends.

When Dahl first arrived as a replacement pilot and met Coke, Coke told him the RAF's situation was "absolutely hopeless." He told Dahl:

'I was in the Battle of Britain before I came here. That was bad enough, but it was peanuts compared to this crazy place. We have no radar here at all . . . The Greeks are our radar. We have a Greek peasant sitting on the top of every mountain for miles around, and when he spots a bunch of German planes he calls up the Ops Room here on a field telephone. That’s our radar." ‘Does it work?’ ‘Now and again it does,’ he said.’

While serving in Libya, Coke was awarded the Distinguished Flying Cross for his work in an attack on enemy transport and for his leadership as a flight lieutenant. The citation read:

Flight Lieutenant The Hon. David Arthur COKE (73042), Royal Air Force Volunteer Reserve, No. 80 Squadron (since missing).
This officer participated in an attack on enemy transport on the El-Adem-Acroma road one day in November 1941, in which a large number of vehicles, tanks and mechanised transport were bombed and machine-gunned. The damage inflicted played a very large part in the blocking of the road. By his skill and leadership, Flight Lieutenant Coke contributed materially to the success achieved. In addition to the low flying machine-gunning operations which have been carried out, Flight Lieutenant Coke has led the squadron with great success in air combat. During an engagement 2 days later, the squadron shared in the destruction of 5 Messerschmitt 109's.

Coke was killed in action by enemy Bf 109s in Acroma, Cyrenaica, Africa, on Tuesday, 9 December 1941, five days after his twenty-sixth birthday, and buried at Knightsbridge War Cemetery, Acroma, Libya (Ref. B.A. 3. B. 18). He also taught Roald Dahl how to fly a Hurricane.
