= Modern psychoanalysis =

Psychoanalytic technique

Modern psychoanalysis is the term used by Hyman Spotnitz to describe the techniques he developed for the treatment of narcissistic (also called preverbal or preoedipal) disorders.

== Theory ==
Narcissism is understood (by Spotnitz) as a state in which unexpressed aggression and hostility are trapped within the psychic apparatus with corrosive effects on mind and body. The bottled up aggression is turned against the self by a weak and undeveloped ego that is not capable of handling the stress of hateful feelings. The techniques of modern psychoanalysis are aimed at allowing the ego to direct aggression outward in productive ways and at protecting a fragile ego against the self-attack seen in cases ranging from schizophrenia, depression, and somatization to neurotic forms of self-sabotage. This is accomplished by helping the patient to "say everything."

The ego is protected by what is called "object oriented questions." These are questions directed toward the motives of other people rather than the patient, i.e., "What makes her do that?" or, "Why did I do that?” To guide the quality and number of such interventions modern analysts follow the "contact function," the efforts made by the patient to establish some discourse with the analyst. Questions asked by the patient indicate what the patient is ready to talk about and are explored to help the patient say more. Meadow describes the contact function as responding, "’in kind,’ thus replacing subjectively determined timing as used in traditional insight-oriented interpretation with what might be called ‘demand feeding’.

In the interest of helping patients to say everything while functioning at an optimum level, the analyst refrains from interpreting defenses and instead "joins the resistance.” In joining, the analyst conveys acceptance of the patient's thoughts and feelings, stated or unstated, conscious or unconscious. Joining reduces the need for a particular defense by making the patient less defensive.

Although modern analysis forgoes interpretation as the main form of intervention, it retains the classical psychoanalytic focus on transference, countertransference, and resistance. The transference is usually a narcissistic one in which feelings and patterns of defense from the first years of life are revived. The "narcissistic transference" is not so much a projection of figures from the past onto the analyst, as an externalization of parts of the patient's self. Often a benign feeling of oneness with the analyst prevails at the beginning of treatment. Such patients may make little or no contact with the analyst.

Modern analysts find that narcissistic transference develops in all patients, and to facilitate its full expression they recommend that the analyst not attempt to correct the patient's perceptions which would emphasize the differences between patient and analyst, undermining their narcissistic connection. Since patients who are struggling with bottled-up rage often hate themselves, they are apt to hate the analyst as well. The transference, which binds them to the therapist, permits the expression of feelings patients cannot own. In the negative narcissistic transference, they hate the analyst as they hate themselves. When the analyst is seen as an extension of the self, aggression may be more freely and safely expressed, lessening patients’ self-hatred and allowing them to slowly emerge from their narcissistic state.

Patients are encouraged to have and express all their feelings toward their analysts, including the most hostile and negative ones. Analysts are expected to have, but not necessarily express, all possible feelings for their patients. Eventually the analyst's emotional responses (objective countertransference) will be used for therapeutic purposes but not until patients are able to hear them without narcissistic injury. In The Edinburgh International Encyclopedia of Psychoanalysis, an entry describing modern psychoanalysis reads in part: "The analyst was advised to use induced countertransference emotions as the basis for responses to the patient rather than cognitive explanations….The modern talking cure emphasizes experiences lived and spoken in the analytic room: de-emphasizing reconstruction of the past."

An outcome study by Meadow explored the relative effectiveness of two types of interventions: interpretation and reflection. In the presence of a transference resistance she randomly offered either an interpretation of unconscious motives or a joining of the defense. However, this type of quantitative statistical study is unusual in the psychoanalytic community. The qualitative research method recommended by modern analytic institutes is described in an issue of the journal Modern Psychoanalysis. Candidates conduct single case studies in which the psychoanalytic sessions are used as laboratories to investigate the unconscious motives of specific transference resistances. Other modern analytic writings consider such topics as a comparison of the work of Kernberg, Kohut and Spotnitz; the interactions of the psyche and soma; the application of modern techniques in schools; in analytic training; in groups; and gender studies.

Spotnitz's repeated advice to clinicians he trained was to "just get the patient to say everything." A book Just Say Everything has contributions by those who were analyzed or supervised by Spotnitz who "say everything" about Spotnitz and themselves.

== See also ==
- Analytical psychology
- Hyman Spotnitz
- Psychoanalysis
