= George Goodman (RAF officer) =

WWII British flying ace

George Ernest Goodman DFC
- Born: 8 October 1920; Haifa, British Military Administered Palestine
- Died: 14 June 1941 (aged 20) near Kambut, Italian Libya
- Burial place: Knightsbridge War Cemetery, Acroma, Libya
- Military career
- Allegiance: United Kingdom
- Branch: Royal Air Force
- Service years: 1939–1941
- Rank: Flying Officer
- Nicknames: Randy (No. 1 Squadron); Benny (No. 73 Squadron)
- Units: 1 Squadron; 73 Squadron
- Conflicts: World War II: Battle of France; Battle of Britain; North African Campaign; Western Desert Campaign †
- Awards: Distinguished Flying Cross

Flying Officer George Ernest Goodman DFC (8 October 1920 – 14 June 1941), nicknamed Randy and Benny, was a Royal Air Force flying ace of the Second World War and one of the Few who flew in the Battle of Britain, credited with ten individual kills and six shared.

== Early life ==
Goodman was born in Haifa on 8 October 1920 to a British father, Sidney Charles Goodman, and a Jewish mother, Bida Lerner. His father was an engineer for Palestine Railways. His mother was born in Zikhron Ya'akov to one of the settlement's founding families. He had two sisters, Winifred and Ellen. His parents were married in St Luke's Church in Haifa, circa 1920. Goodman was sent to the United Kingdom to be educated at Highgate School in London. He was a member of the Officer Training Corps whilst at school. His parents left Haifa in 1939 when his father was transferred to Lagos, Nigeria as a British civil servant with the Nigerian Railway.

== Royal Air Force ==
Goodman joined the Royal Air Force in 1939 and was granted a short service (six-year) commission on 2 September 1939 with the rank of Acting Pilot Officer.

He undertook Elementary & Reserve Flying Training and then attended Flying Training School, where he converted to the Hawker Hurricane. On 27 February 1940, he was assigned to No. 11 Group Pool 11 and then went to an Operational Training Unit.

=== Battle of France ===
On 1 May 1940, Goodman was assigned to No. 1 Squadron RAF and joined the squadron in the Battle of France.

He was credited with his first kill on 13 May 1940, a Heinkel He 111; he shared a Messerschmitt Bf 110 the same day. He also shared in the destruction of an He 111 on 14 May 1940 and was credited with one final kill, an He 111, on 17 June 1940 before No. 1 Squadron left France.

He was confirmed as a Pilot Officer on 10 July 1940. On 25 July, he was attacked by four Messerschmitt Bf 109s off the Isle of Portland. He did not fire his guns but one of the Me 109s spun into the sea after a violent breakaway. He shared in the destruction of an Bf 109 off Cherbourg on 11 August and destroyed a He 111 on 16 August. On 18 August, he destroyed an Me 110, shared in the destruction of a Dornier Do 17, and was attacked by an Bf 109 which chased him back to the English coast and riddled his aircraft with bullets and cannon shells. Goodman managed to land his Hurricane but the aircraft was written off.

=== Battle of Britain ===
Compared to many who flew during the Battle of Britain, Goodman was a relatively experienced pilot because he had flown combat in the Battle of France.

He was credited with a Messerschmitt Bf 109 of III./JG 27 on 25 July 1940, believed to be Oberstleutenant Kirschstein, who was killed. On 11 August, he shared a Bf 110 destroyed. He was credited with a KG 55 He 111 on 16 August, a Bf 110 of ZG 26 and shared a Dornier Do 17 of KG 76 on 18 August. On 6 September, he was credited with a Bf 110 and shot down during this action, injuring his shoulder while bailing. His plane crashed at Brownings Farm, Chiddingstone Causeway.

He returned to operations shortly afterward, and on 8 October 1940, he shared a Junkers Ju 88 damaged and was credited with a Do 17 shared damaged on 27 October.

=== Distinguished Flying Cross ===
Goodman was awarded the Distinguished Flying Cross for meritorious service during the Battle of Britain, which was gazetted on 26 November 1940. The citation reads:

Pilot Officer George Ernest Goodman (42598) — No. 1 Squadron.
"This officer has performed outstanding work in all his engagements against the enemy. In October, 1940, he assisted in the destruction of an enemy bomber which was attacking an aerodrome in the failing light at dusk. His courage and resourcefulness have enabled him to destroy at least six enemy aircraft."

=== Western Desert ===
In November 1940, Goodman was deployed to take part in the Western Desert campaign with No. 73 Squadron RAF. He embarked for North Africa with his squadron on the aircraft carrier HMS Furious. In December, while en route to North Africa, he stopped in Lagos and saw his mother for what was to be the last time. He missed a reunion with his father, who was with an economic mission in the Belgian Congo at the time. As the squadron flew out, they performed a barrel roll over the Goodman home in Ebute Metta.

On 4 February 1941, Goodman was credited with shooting down a German Bf 110 of III./ZG 26 at Tobruk and a Fiat CR.42 on Barca. The pilot of the Italian fighter – who was killed – was Capitano Guglielmo Chiarini, an ace from 366ª Squadriglia, 151º Gruppo, 53º Stormo Caccia Terrestre, who flew Savoia-Marchetti S.79 bombers in Spanish Civil War, and had been decorated several times by Italy and Spain. Goodman was promoted to Flying Officer on 28 February 1941.

On 9 April 1941, he shot down an Bf 110 near Tobruk and was shot down in turn during this engagement, either by ground fire or the Bf 110 of 7./ZG 26 piloted by Oblt. Georg Christl. Luckily, he crashed behind British lines.

On 14 April, Goodman shared in the destruction of a Henschel Hs 126, and on 21 April, destroyed a Junkers Ju 87 and shared another. In late April 1941, he was granted a period of leave and visited his sisters in Haifa.

== Death ==
Goodman was shot down and killed by flak while strafing Gazala airfield on 14 June 1941. His aircraft crashed at Kambut. His body lies in the Knightsbridge War Cemetery, Acroma, a British war cemetery in Libya (grave 10.C.21).

== Nationality ==
In the 1969 film Battle of Britain, Goodman is credited as a pilot from Israel, although the State of Israel was not proclaimed until 1948. He was a British subject because he was born during the British administration of Palestine, and his father was British.

In an article in Jewish Historical Studies, citing the work of Battle of Britain historian Kenneth G. Wynn and Royal Air Force Museum researcher John Edwards, historian Martin Sugarman concluded that Goodman was Jewish and "was in fact an Israeli 'sabra' and the only Israeli in the Battle of Britain".In 1997, the Israel Air Force Bulletin described him as "our first Ace, born in Israel".

Goodman was described as Palestinian by R. T. Bickers, an RAF veteran of the war, in a 50th anniversary publication commemorating the Battle of Britain, and by Richard Hough and Denis Richards in The Battle of Britain (London 1965).
