= Systems-centered therapy =

Type of group therapy

Systems-centered therapy (SCT) is a particular form of group therapy based on the Theory of Living Human Systems developed by Yvonne Agazarian. The theory postulates that living human systems survive, develop, and transform from simple to complex through discriminating and integrating information. Corresponding to the small and rigorously defined set of concepts, SCT defines a set of methods, techniques and instruments. SCT practitioners use these with individuals, couples and groups to explore the experience of their differences and work with these to integrate them. Using the method of functional subgrouping, these living human systems increase their ability to see both sides of their issues and resolve them productively. The theory was first developed in Agazarian's 1997 book, Systems-Centered Therapy for Groups, and grew out of her earlier work in group psychotherapy under the influence of such figures as W. R. Bion and John Bowlby through the further input of the general systems theory of Ludwig von Bertalanffy.

Systems-centered theory explains how living human systems contain their energy within functional boundaries and direct it towards their goals: the primary goals of survival and development and the secondary goals of environmental mastery. In SCT training groups, all members work in functional subgroups rather than work alone. Subgroups work both sides of every issue in the group-as-a-whole. This practice strengthens both the therapeutic capacity of the training group and allows individual members to choose which side of the conflict has therapeutic salience for their own personal work.

== Theory of Living Human Systems: an introduction ==
Systems-centered therapy and consultation developed by Yvonne Agazarian is based on the Theory of Living Human Systems, a theory that can be applied to any living human system as small as one individual or a large group and couples, families, classrooms, committees, businesses or even nations. Thus the theory offers a set of ideas for thinking about how living human systems work that can be applied at any level.

The theory defines "a hierarchy of isomorphic systems that are energy-organizing, self-correcting and goal directed" – working on the assumption that psychic patterns will be repeated in the same form (isomorphy)at every nested level of interaction. Each of these constructs is then operationally defined with methods developed that test the hypothesis of the theory. In this way, it offers a comprehensive systems theory and methodology of practice that can be applied in clinical, organizational and educational settings. Most importantly, Agazarian's theory of living human systems introduces the hypothesis that the single essential process by which living human systems survive, develop and transform is by discriminating and integrating differences.

== Working with differences ==
Differences are challenging for people, whether they are differences in opinions, beliefs, ideas, wishes, or feelings. Differences are challenging even when we find them inside of ourselves. Groups often respond to differences that are "too different" by ignoring the differences, avoiding the differences, trying to change or convert the differences or blaming, judging or scapegoating the differences. Groups that respond in these ways to differences can survive unchanged for a long time since anything that challenges the status quo does not become incorporated into the group or is rejected by the group.

Because of this tendency, Systems-centered therapists or consultants pay a lot of attention to communication within the system. They are particularly looking to reduce the defensive "noise" within the communication. Noise is defined as contradictions, (Simon and Agazarian), ambiguities and redundancies (Shannon and Weaver). This concept of noise was developed from work by Shannon and Weaver who formulated observations about the inverse relationship between noise and information transfer. By highlighting and reducing contradiction, ambiguities, and redundancies, i.e. "noise", communication is more effective in transferring information and the system has a better chance of discriminating and integrating its differences.

According to the theory of living human systems, groups that are able to take in and use differences are able to not only survive but also develop and transform. This kind of development enables groups to use their differences as resources to find solutions to problems that are more comprehensive and responsive to the complexity of the problem. They are able to move with less difficulty toward their goals.

=== Functional subgrouping ===
In systems-centered therapy, members are taught to manage differences and resolve conflicts by a technique called functional subgrouping. Rather than individual members working alone, functional subgrouping requires that all members of a system that are similar work together to deeply explore their similarity. When that subgroup finishes its exploration, the subgroup holding a difference begins its work, exploring their similarities with one another. Inevitably, as the members of a subgroup talk with each other, they discover differences (i.e., differences within the apparently similar) within their subgroup and also, find similarities with the other subgroup (similarities in the apparently different). By using functional subgrouping, the whole group has a better chance of integrating its differences rather than rejecting differences. When a group can make use of its differences it becomes more complex and interesting akin to the way music is enriched by harmonies or interwoven themes. The group moves from the survival of the status quo to development and transformation.

SCT clients learn through experience. By exploring one's experience rather than explaining it, members learn to tell the difference between comprehensive understanding (words first, experience second) and apprehensive understanding (experience first, words second). Clients learn to restore the connection between their comprehensive, thinking self and their emotional, intuitive self. Learning this skill leads to "containing" the energy and gaining the knowledge that frustrations and conflicts arouse, rather than discharging, binding or constricting it in defensive symptoms. Energy in SCT is understood as the ability of the group or individual to work towards its goals.

== Working with perspectives ==
Another important part of the theory of living human systems is that groups function more effectively when there is the capacity to shift perspective from the perspective of the individual to the perspective of the whole group. Being able to shift perspective from seeing things from the perspective of a person in a group (or couple or family or business, etc.) to the perspective of a member of the group creates a climate of mutual work toward a common goal. Individuals who are able to make the shift from the perspective of an individual to the perspective of a member or systems-centered perspective are less likely to take personally the inevitable challenges that arise as a human system moves toward its goal. When we take things less personally, we are less likely to get bogged down in frustration, hurt feelings and unproductive arguments. When we understand ourselves in the context of the systems that we belong to and co-create - our families, schools, businesses, labor unions, political parties, churches, sports clubs - we not only participate in their tasks, we are also involved in their development: establishing the distribution of authority and the degree of trust that help these systems survive and grow. Doing this, we contribute to the system balance between innovation and continuity, and at the same time strike a balance between our own desire to learn and our want for security.

== Phases of development ==
The systems-centered methods which developed from the theory of living human systems offers a map of predictable phases for the development of human systems. In the first phase of development, a system comes to terms with the issues of giving and taking authority and with the authority that resides in the members. Successful management of this phase leads to cooperation between members and between members and leaders. Unsuccessful management of this phase results in members behaving defiantly or compliantly which inevitably undermines the group's development.

In the second phase, called the intimacy phase, the group wrestles with the challenges of closeness and distance from fellow members. This is the phase of team building for workgroups and the phase in which the issues related to separation and individuation are explored in therapy groups. As the group works in this phase it explores the pull to becoming enchanted with itself or becoming disenchanted and falling into despair with no energy to do its work. Successful management of this phase allows members to gain greater access and intimacy with themselves and also to work together with others in a climate of tested and mutual trust.

In the third phase of development, the group has the opportunity to develop a greater access to its emotional and rational intelligence and develops the capacity to use that information effectively in the service of the group's goals. The group works more efficiently as it is more able to accept the reality of the role each member plays in the group, and stays more connected to the goal of the group and the reality of the environment in which the group is working.

Successfully managing the challenges of these phases of development means that the system is capable of developing an effective distribution of authority, establishing a climate of trust, and developing the capacity for system adaptation and learning. Wheelan (2005) has shown that work groups that are more developed in their phases have increased productivity.

== As psychotherapy ==
The theory of living human systems has been applied to psychotherapy as well as to business, organizational and educational consultation. In its application to psychotherapy, a unique aspect of this theory is that it is equally applicable to both individual and couples psychotherapy and to group psychotherapy. SCT posits that much of a person's suffering is related to viewing oneself only from the perspective of the individual self, a person-centered view. By developing a capacity to see oneself from the perspective of the system one is a part of, a systems-centered perspective, the psychotherapy client is able to more consciously influence their own development and the development of the systems they are a part of.

A SCT therapist uses the phases of development described in the theory of living human systems to systemically train a client to recognize states of mind that interfere with reaching the client's goal. These interfering states of mind are referred to as defenses. Two of the most common defenses that bring people to psychotherapy are anxiety and depression; these are addressed in the first phase of treatment. Clients are taught how to recognize and reduce these defenses so that they are freed to traverse life less painfully and more smoothly. SCT work is a partnership in which the therapist governs the structure of the therapy and clients make a series of manageable choices at different "forks in the road". Each fork is a choice a person makes between familiar defenses and experiencing the emotion, conflict or impulses that triggered the defense. The Systems-Centered therapist teaches the client to systematically weaken the defense, such as anxiety or tension, in a structured sequence that matches the client's ability to choose. As each defense is undone, the client can choose to take the fork in the road away from the symptoms generated by their defensive responses, and towards discovering the conflicts, between their emotions or impulses and the fears of their emotions or impulses, that were being defended against. As SCT psychotherapy proceeds, the client acquires skills that increase their ability to undo their own defenses. Through this process, clients regain their ability to use their common sense, (and existential humor!) to manage the every day conflicts between themselves and reality. Clear outcome criteria for each step are in the sequence of defense modification locates the client in the SCT treatment plan. Because each defense modification addresses a specific symptom, therapy can be delivered either continuously or chunked into modules. SCT can therefore be applied to the goals of both short-term and long-term therapy.

== Criticism ==
Irvin D. Yalom has seen the formation of subgroups as a negative indicator in the context of group therapy.

== See also ==
- Family therapy
- Intensive short-term dynamic psychotherapy
- Liminality
- Role suction
