= Knightsbridge War Cemetery =

WWII CWGC cemetery in Libya

Coordinates: 32°05′45″N 23°43′12″E

Knightsbridge War Cemetery is a war cemetery located in Acroma, Libya, located 750 metres south of the main road from Benghazi to Tobruk, 25 km (16 mi) west of Tobruk. The cemetery is situated in open country, the Cross of Sacrifice is set high above the level of the cemetery and is easily seen from the road. The cemetery is reached from a track branching off the main road.

Knightsbridge was the name given to a static base or "box" established around a junction of tracks some 20 km west of Tobruk and 16 km south of Acroma. This box commanded all the supplies which went to the allied front lines, as well as the fuelling stations and airfields at Acroma, El Adem, El Duda, Sidi Rezegh and Gambut. Knightsbridge was therefore a key position and the heavy armoured battles which started in late May 1942 pivoted on this position, with fierce fighting throughout this area. A battlefield cemetery was created in all of these area to bury the Commonwealth troops killed in these actions.

It is the resting place of 3,651 Commonwealth servicemen who were killed or died during the fighting in the area during World War II, 2,676 of whom have been identified. Many had been buried in temporary battlefield cemeteries or individual graves and their remains were relocated to Knightsbridge while those who lie without graves are commemorated at the Alamein Memorial. There are also 18 non-Commonwealth burials at Knightsbridge including one Polish soldier and one non-combatant.

== Notable burials ==
- John Beeley, Victoria Cross recipient
- Noel Agazarian, flying ace
- George Goodman, flying ace
- George Salvidge, footballer
- George Gardiner
- James Smith, flying ace
- David Coke, flying ace
- Geoffrey Warren, cricketer

== See also ==
- Siege of Tobruk
- Commonwealth War Graves Commission
