= Multiple impact therapy =

Psychotherapy technique

Multiple impact therapy (MIT) is a group psychotherapy technique most often used with families in extreme crisis. It was one of the first group therapy programs developed in the United States. In multiple impact therapy (MIT), families are seen concurrently by a number of multi-disciplinary medical professionals. The duration of the therapy is short, typically ranging from one to two full treatment days. The focus of treatment is to find and evaluate structural patterns within the family, evaluate those patterns to see if they are the source of the problem, then modify the structure to alleviate the problem. It can also be used as a screening technique to discover whether individuals should be admitted for further treatment.

== Origins ==
MIT as a therapy technique was developed at the University of Texas Medical Branch in the 1950s. At the time, Texas had very few psychoanalysts and those that were available were unaffordable to most families. Because treatment was scarce, there were few specialized programs for adolescents, many were admitted as patients to psychiatric hospitals. Beginning in 1957, parents began bringing their troubled kids to the University of Texas Medical Branch for treatment.

Dr. Robert MacGregor, the lead researcher of group psychotherapy at the University of Texas Medical Branch, began developing MIT by interviewing entire families together in a single session. MacGregor and his team established their main goal as highlighting and emphasizing the parent's concern to the disturbed child. Between 1957 and 1958, the team saw 12 families as the procedures were being developed. The initial sessions showed that therapy with individual members, together with group sessions, produced the most effective results. The individual sessions gave members the opportunity to voice their personal resentments while the group sessions gave therapists the opportunity to repair poor communication between family members. The therapy's short, intensive time frame was originally due to life constraints involving time and travel; however, researchers kept the structure because the momentum created in the two day meetings reduced the overall number of sessions needed for the family to improve.

== Outcomes ==
Multiple Impact therapy aims to identify and modify patterns of behavior within a family structure, alter inappropriate roles of family members and improve communication between family members.

The use of an interdisciplinary team allows the parents, the child and the group as a whole to be seen from multiple viewpoints and through the lens of professionals with different experience and expertise. A typical interdisciplinary team as used in Macgregor's studies at the University of Texas consisted of a psychologist, an associate therapist, a social worker, a nurse, and a member of the family's community or inpatient clinic, however, other researchers have used up to 9 therapists in a single session. By including the community or inpatient staff member in MIT, trust and respect with the child's parents increases.

Fifty-five additional families were seen between 1958 and 1962 when MacGregor first published his findings on MIT. Within the fifty-five families, only seven were considered unsuccessful cases. Despite the apparent success of MIT, two major drawbacks, the relative efficiency of the program and conflict between the interdisciplinary team, were noted.

== Procedure ==
MIT may be prescribed to families as a treatment option for a number of reasons: when conventional therapy fails to show results, as an alternative to hospitalization, as a final course of action before hospitalization, or for families who were already in group therapy but were seeing few results.

Treatment occurs in approximately seven steps over a two-day period. It begins with a planning and briefing session to inform participants and gain an understanding of the family situation. Parents and children are separated, with therapists meeting parents to investigate the source of the child's delinquency and an interview with the child to match family patterns with a child's behavior. A multiple therapist session is then held, with therapists meeting with any member or any number of members together as they see fit. Family members then reconvene to share their progress and improved attitudes towards one another.

On the second day, families forge ahead with the positive attitude fostered during the first day. Day one often illuminates many of the breakdowns the family has experienced while day two focuses on retention of improved attitudes and application to the family's unique situation. On day two, logistical considerations are often discussed such as: should the child remain hospitalized, continue schooling, or consider a different method of treatment. A two-month and six month follow up appointment is typically scheduled.
