= Geoffrey Warren (cricketer) =

English cricketer and British Indian Army officer

Personal information
- Full name: Geoffrey Martin Warren
- Born: 2 March 1908; Alresford, Hampshire, England
- Died: 21 November 1941 (aged 33); Sidi Razegh, Cyrenaica, Italian Libya
- Batting: Unknown
- Role: Wicket-keeper

Career statistics
Competition	First-class
Matches	1
Runs scored	4
Batting average	4.00
100s/50s	–/–
Top score	3
Catches/stumpings	1/1
- Source: ESPNcricinfo, 17 December 2021

Geoffrey Martin Warren (2 March 1908 – 21 November 1941) was an English first-class cricketer and British Army officer.

== Early life and education ==
The son of Lieutenant Colonel Percy Bliss Warren and his wife, Margaret, he was born at Alresford in March 1908. Warren was educated at Wellington College, where he decided to pursue a career in the British Army. He graduated from the Royal Military College at Sandhurst into the Royal Tank Corps as a second lieutenant in February 1928.

== Career ==
Warren was posted to British India in 1930, receiving his promotion to lieutenant while there in February 1931. Warren played first-class cricket in India for the Roshanara Club, making a single appearance against a Viceroy's XI at Delhi in February 1933. Playing as a wicket-keeper he took a single catch and made stumping, in addition to batting in both of the Roshanara Club's innings'. He batted at number eleven in their first innings, ending it unbeaten having scored a single run. In their second innings he was promoted to open the batting, scoring three runs before being dismissed by Eustace Hill. He departed India in 1935.

Warren returned to England, where he took up the post of instructor at Lulworth Camp in 1937, with promotion to captain following in October of the same year. He remained at Lulworth throughout the first year of the Second World War, before being sent to the Middle East as a squadron commander in November 1940. He served in Greece during the Italian invasion, where he was second in command of the 6th Royal Tank Regiment. Following the German intervention and subsequent Allied defeat in Greece, Warren saw action in the North African campaign and led the advance into Italian Libya in November 1941.

== Personal life ==
Warren was fatally wounded during the action at Sidi Rezegh and was captured by German forces. He was buried at the Knightsbridge War Cemetery in Libya and was survived by his wife, Margaret, and their son Brian.
