= Noel Agazarian =

British World War II fighter ace (1916-1941)

Noël le Chevalier Agazarian
- Noel Agazarian, photographed at RAF Warmwell, August 1940
- Born: 26 December 1916; London, England
- Died: 16 May 1941 (aged 24) near Kambut, Italian Libya
- Burial place: Knightsbridge War Cemetery, Acroma
- Relatives: Jack Agazarian (brother); Monique Agazarian (sister); Yvonne Agazarian (sister); Francine Agazarian (sister-in-law)
- Military career
- Allegiance: United Kingdom
- Branch: Royal Air Force
- Service years: 1939–1941
- Rank: Flying Officer
- Nickname: Aggy
- Units: No. 609 Squadron; No. 274 Squadron
- Conflicts: World War II; Battle of Britain; North African campaign †

Noël le Chevalier Agazarian (26 December 1916 – 16 May 1941) was a British World War II fighter ace with seven victories. He was the brother of Special Operations Executive agent Jack Agazarian, who was executed by the Germans in 1945, and Monique Agazarian, pilot, author and businesswoman.

== Early life ==
Noël Agazarian's father was Berge Agazarian (died 1944), an Armenian who arrived in the United Kingdom in 1911 as a teenager with little money. However he eventually prospered, owning a successful electrical engineering company. He married Frenchwoman Jacqueline Marie-Louise le Chevalier. They had six children, four boys (three of whom later joined the Royal Air Force) and two girls, one of whom, Monique Agazarian, later served as a pilot in the Air Transport Auxiliary. The four siblings' interest in aviation may have been sparked by their mother, who bought a World War I surplus Sopwith Pup fighter for £5 at a Croydon auction, and parked it in the back garden of the family house for use as a plaything by her children.

Noël Agazarian was schooled at Dulwich College, where he was a member of the first XV Rugby union team, captained both the swimming and boxing teams and was awarded the Victor Ludorum for sporting achievement. He then went on to Wadham College, Oxford in 1935. An earlier application to Trinity College, Oxford was rejected, allegedly because the Trinity College President, Herbert Blakiston, objected to Agazarian's ethnicity. (Note: Agazarian later said that Blakiston wrote to his school headmaster, stating that the college could not accept him as, "in 1911, when the last coloured gentleman had been at Trinity, it had really proved most unfortunate.". While not unique at Oxford University for disfavouring applications from non-white candidates, Blakiston had developed a particular notoriety for this. Notably, he stubbornly resisted pressure from the India Office to admit undergraduates from British India, something that government department was attempting to promote.) At Oxford, Agazarian began his flying career with the Oxford University Air Squadron. He achieved a blue in boxing and became friends with Richard Hillary, who became well known some years later for his autobiography The Last Enemy about his time as a fighter pilot.

Hillary later wrote this description of Agazarian:

Noël, with his pleasantly ugly face, had been sent down (Note: Sent down, expelled.) from Oxford over a slight matter of breaking up his college and intended reading for the Bar. With an Armenian father and a French mother he was by nature cosmopolitan, intelligent, and a brilliant linguist, but an English education had discovered that he was an athlete, and his University triumphs had been of brawn rather than brain. Of this he was very well aware and somewhat bewildered by it. These warring elements in his make-up made him a most amusing companion and a very good friend.

— Richard Hillary

== RAF service ==
Noël Agazarian joined the Royal Air Force as a Volunteer Reservist and was commissioned as a pilot officer on 14 February 1939. He completed his initial flying training at the same time as Richard Hillary, at Lossiemouth, after which both were assigned to Old Sarum, to train as army co-operation pilots. (Note: The job of army co–operation pilots included tasks such as reconnaissance, aerial photography and aerial artillery spotting) They flew Westland Lysander liaison aircraft and Hawker Hector biplanes; during the training, Agazarian crashed a Hector but was unscathed. By the time his course ended in June 1940, France had fallen, the Dunkirk evacuation had taken place and a German invasion of Britain was thought to be imminent. Because of this crisis, Hillary and Agazarian were both amongst the majority of pilots from the graduating Army co-operation class who were immediately reassigned as fighter pilots, something that pleased Agazarian immensely.

After a few weeks of fighter training, Agazarian joined No. 609 Squadron, a fighter squadron flying Supermarine Spitfires and based at Warmwell in Dorset. His first victory was on 11 August, when he shot down a Messerschmitt Bf 110 heavy fighter around 15 miles (24 km) south of the Isle of Portland. It appears his victim was Gruppenkommandeur (Group Commander) Major Ernst Ott of Zerstörergeschwader 2. Ott was killed along with his gunner/radio operator. On 12 August, he shot down two Messerschmitt Bf 109 fighters and damaged a Bf 110 around five miles (8 km) south of Portsmouth. This occurred during a large battle, when a formation of German bombers and their fighter escorts were intercepted by three RAF fighter squadrons after they bombed Portsmouth and its dockyards.

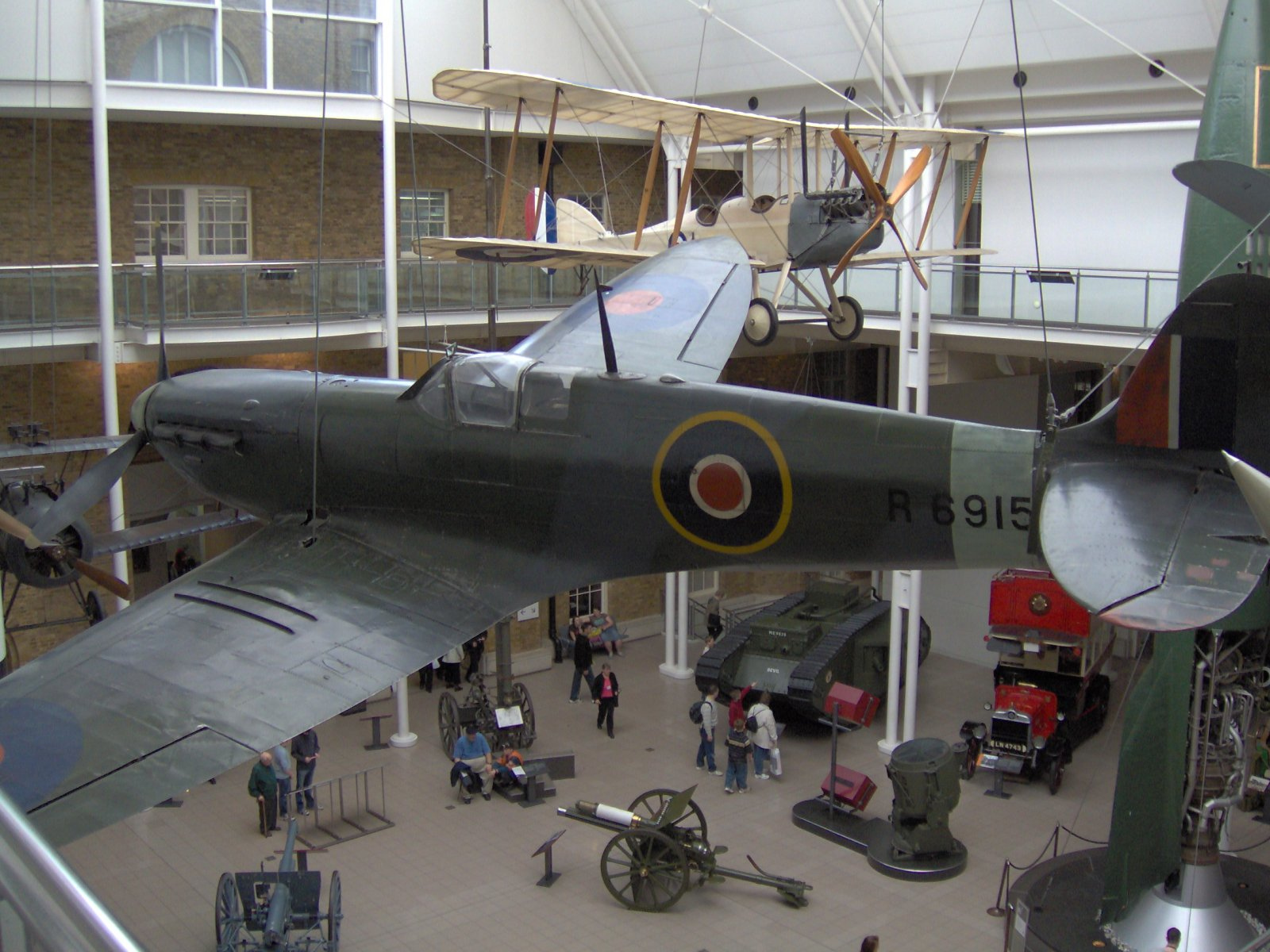
Spitfire R6915, Imperial War Museum (2005)

Agazarian was promoted from pilot officer to flying officer on 14 August and continued to fly throughout the Battle of Britain. His last victory with No. 609 Squadron was on 2 December, when he shared in the destruction of a Dornier Do 17 bomber with Polish pilot Tadeusz Nowierski (in Polish). By this time he had shot down six aircraft, damaged four and shared in the destruction of three. One of the aircraft he flew during the battle, Supermarine Spitfire number R6915, still exists and is preserved in the Imperial War Museum in London. He twice made forced landings in it because of battle damage, but used it to shoot down four German aircraft and damage another.

In January 1941, Agazarian received a requested transfer to No. 274 Squadron in North Africa, a fighter squadron equipped with Hawker Hurricanes. On 1 May 1941, he destroyed a Bf 109 over Tobruk, Libya. However, on 16 May, he was shot down and killed by Fw. Franz Elles in a Bf 109 of 2./JG 27 near Gambut (Kambut), during the Commonwealth offensive known as Operation Brevity. He is buried in the Knightsbridge War Cemetery, Acroma, Libya.
