= Asya Kadis =

Asya L. Kadis (May 5, 1902 - February 3, 1971) was a 20th-century internationally recognized group therapy expert and psychiatrist. She was a leader in using psychoanalytic principles with groups, families, and in classrooms.

Born Asya L. Kadish in Riga, Latvia, she attended the University of Vienna and trained with Alfred Adler. She came to the United States in 1940. From 1957 until her death, she was director of the Group Therapy Clinic at the Postgraduate Center for Mental Health and an assistant professor in the psychiatry department at SUNY Downstate Medical Center.

She died at age 68 at her home on Park Avenue in New York City on February 3, 1971. Her husband Max Kadis predeceased her. She was survived by a daughter and two grandchildren.
