= Jack Agazarian =

English espionage agent (1915–1945)

- Born: 27 August 1915; London
- Died: 29 March 1945 (aged 29); Flossenbürg concentration camp
- Education: Dulwich College
- Spouse: Francine Agazarian
- Parents: Berge Rupen Agazarian (father); Jacqueline Marie-Louise Le Chevalier (mother)
- Relatives: Noel Agazarian (brother); Monique Agazarian (sister); Yvonne Agazarian (sister)
- Military career
- Allegiance: United Kingdom, France
- Branch: RAFVR, Special Operations Executive, French Resistance
- Service years: 1940-1945
- Rank: Honorary Flight Lieutenant, SOE Field agent
- Units: F Section, SOE
- Commands: Prosper
- Conflicts: World War II
- Awards: Legion of Honour – (1946)

Jack Charles Stanmore Agazarian (27 August 1915 – 29 March 1945), code name Marcel, was an agent for the United Kingdom's clandestine Special Operations Executive (SOE) organization in France during World War II. The purpose of SOE was to conduct espionage, sabotage, and reconnaissance in countries occupied by Nazi Germany and other Axis powers. SOE agents allied themselves with French Resistance groups and supplied them with weapons and equipment parachuted in from England. Agazarian was a wireless operator with the Prosper network based in Paris.

Agazarian was captured by the Germans on 30 July 1943 when he showed up for a scheduled meeting with a fellow agent. The Germans had captured the other agent and were trying to lure the deputy leader of SOE's French Section, Nicolas Bodington, to the meeting, but Agazarian attended instead. He was later executed. Agazarian's wife Francine was also a SOE agent.

== Early life ==
Agazarian was born in London, to an Armenian father, Berge Rupen Agazarian, and French mother, Jacqueline Marie-Louise Le Chevalier, the second of six children. He was educated in both France and England at Dulwich College. After completing his education he worked with his father in the family business. He joined the Royal Air Force in 1940 soon after the outbreak of World War II and the SOE's French Section on 30 May 1942 and was trained as a wireless operator. His younger brother, Noel Agazarian, also joined the Royal Air Force, but as a Spitfire pilot; he went on to be a flying ace in the Battle of Britain before being killed in action on 16 May 1941. His sister Monique Agazarian flew for the Air Transport Auxiliary during the same conflict.

Agazarian received an honorary commission as a pilot officer in the RAFVR on 10 September 1942. He was promoted to honorary flying officer on 12 January 1943.

== Special Operations Executive ==
During his training Agazarian was well-liked by the instructors at SOE who described him as "intelligent, witty, brilliant, and clever." M.R.D. Foot, the official historian of the SOE, described Agazarian as "handsome and dashing."

On 29 December 1942 Agazarian parachuted into France near Étrépagny and made his way to Paris to join the newly created Prosper network headed by Francis Suttill. He was the second of Prosper's two radio operators. Gilbert Norman was Prosper's other wireless operator and Andrée Borrel was the network's courier. In January 1943, the three were joined by Henri Déricourt, air operations officer, who arranged for clandestine air flights between England and northern France to transport agents and supplies. Prosper was SOE's most important network in France. The task of Suttill and his associates was to create and assist a resistance movement that would harass and weaken the German occupiers of France and contribute to the success of an allied invasion of France in 1943. (The plans for a 1943 invasion were later abandoned, and the invasion did not take place until 6 June 1944.) Prosper had early and rapid success, setting up or reviving more than 60 resistance networks (or circuits) in northern France and managing and supplying a large number of SOE agents and French operatives. Agazarian's wife, Francine Agazarian, joined him in Paris in March 1943 as a second courier for Prosper.

Competent wireless operators were scarce and Agazarian and Norman were busy transmitting and receiving messages with SOE headquarters in London. Agazarian reported that he sent and received messages for more than 20 SOE agents. That was worrisome from a security standpoint as each SOE network was supposed to have its own wireless operator with little or no contact between networks or even among the members of the same network. The size and scope of Prosper was also a security problem. Agents congregated in the same apartments and met each other in the same cafes. Norman, Borrel, and Agazarian and his wife met frequently to play poker at a Paris cafe.

=== The Dutch Affair ===
In May 1943, Hermann Giskes, head of German Abwehr intelligence in the Netherlands, sent two Dutch agents posing as SOE agents to Paris. The Abwehr agents learned from double agents how to find Agazarian and other Prosper agents and met them at the cafe they frequented. The Dutch agents said they needed to return to England. Agazarian accepted the two Dutch men as authentic SOE agents and took on the task of arranging a flight for them to England with Déricourt, the air operations officer. As it turned out, the objective of the Dutch agents was to infiltrate and gather information about the Prosper network. On 9 June, in a curious affair perhaps indicating competition and lack of coordination between the German Abwehr and the Gestapo, the Gestapo staged a raid on the cafe and arrested or pretended to arrest one of the two Dutch agents. Agazarian escaped and continued to work with the other Dutch agent.

Suttill was disturbed by the incident, regarding Agazarian as careless and too ambitious to have his own SOE network rather than working for Suttill as a wireless operator. He sent Agazarian and his wife back to England on a clandestine flight the night of 16/17 June. At SOE headquarters in London, Agazarian defended himself against the charges by Suttill and also reported that Déricourt was a security risk.

=== Prosper destroyed ===
Acting on the information collected by the Dutch infiltrators and other sources, on 23 June the Germans began arresting members of Prosper including Norman, Borrel, and Suttill. Over the next three months, thirty SOE agents and hundreds of local agents associated with Prosper were arrested, of whom 167 are known to have been deported to Germany where about one-half were executed, killed, or died in concentration camps. The Germans also captured Norman's wireless and sent or forced Norman to send messages to SOE in London to project an air of normalcy in Paris. The SOE F Section chief, Maurice Buckmaster ignored clear indications in the text of the messages that they were not authentic. A newly arrived wireless operator, Noor Inayat Khan, initially escaped arrest and informed SOE headquarters of the arrests although the situation in Paris was unclear. The SOE believed that Gilbert Norman was still free because of the messages sent from his machine.

=== The Bodington mission ===
Many decorations have been conferred on less deserving colleagues, and much ink has been expended in efforts to make some of the least worthy of them appear as heroes; while Agazarian's truly heroic conduct has remained, officially, or unofficially, practically unnoticed.

Agazarian returned to France via airplane on the night of 22–23 July 1943 with F Section Deputy Nicolas Bodington in a mission to determine the status of the Prosper network. They were met by Déricourt, who had not been arrested and was under suspicion of being a German double agent, but was Bodington's friend. Through an exchange of radio messages between Agazarian and "Gilbert Norman" (actually the Germans) a meeting was arranged with "Norman" on 30 July at an address in the rue de Rome near Gare St-Lazare. Bodington and Agazarian were suspicious. According to M.R.D. Foot, they tossed a coin to see who would attend the meeting and Agazarian lost. However, an eye-witness said that Bodington ordered Agazarian to attend the meeting. Agazarian was arrested by the Germans when he arrived at the meeting site. Bodington later returned safely to England to report that the Prosper network had indeed been destroyed by the Germans.

According to Foot, Agazarian was tortured but revealed nothing about Prosper during his imprisonment at Fresnes prison near Paris. He was later moved to Flossenbürg concentration camp in Germany and was executed on 29 March 1945. Just prior to his execution Agazarian tapped out in Morse code on the wall of his cell a message to his wife. The Danish prisoner who received the message later delivered it to SOE and Agazarian's wife.

=== Consequences ===
The circumstances surrounding the destruction of SOE's Prosper Network and the arrest of Agazarian and other SOE agents has stimulated debate among historians of the SOE. Henri Déricourt's role in the destruction of Prosper remains unclear; after the war he was tried as a double agent and admitted contacts with the Germans, but acquitted because of testimony in his favour by his friend Bodington—who has himself been accused of being involved in a mysterious plot by British intelligence to sacrifice SOE agents to distract German attentions from the pending invasions of Italy and Normandy. Foot and Suttill's son, Francis, have debunked the conspiracy theories about the destruction of Prosper. Foot attributed Prosper's downfall to "incompetence and insecurity."

== Legacy ==
Jack Agazarian is honored on the Runnymede Memorial in Surrey, England, on the SOE memorial at Flossenbürg, and also on the Roll of Honor on the Valençay SOE Memorial in Valençay, in the Indre département of France. He received a posthumous mention in dispatches on 13 June 1946, and was also awarded the Légion d'honneur and Croix de guerre by France. Historian Foot said of Agazarian that "many decorations have been conferred on less deserving colleagues, and much ink has been expended in efforts to make some of the least worthy of them appear as heroes, while Agazarian's truly heroic conduct has remained all but unnoticed."

== Bibliography ==
- Foot, Michael Richard Daniell (1966). SOE in France: An Account of the Work of the British Special Operations Executive in France, 1940-1944. H.M. Stationery Office.
  - Foot, Michael Richard Daniell (2004). SOE in France: An Account of the Work of the British Special Operations Executive in France, 1940-1944. Routledge. ISBN 9781280077043.
- Grehan, John; Mace, Martin (19 December 2012). Unearthing Churchill's Secret Army: The Official List of SOE Casualties and Their Stories. Pen and Sword Books. ISBN 978-1-78337-664-3.
- Suttill, Francis J. (2014). Shadows in the Fog (Kindle ed.). Stroud, Gloucestershire: The History Press. ISBN 9780750957625.
