= Monique Agazarian =

- Born: Marie Monique Jacqueline Agazarian; 17 July 1920; Epsom, England
- Died: 3 March 1993 (aged 72)
- Other name: Monique Rendall
- Spouse: Raymond Charles Rendall (m. 1949; div. 1973)
- Partner: Graeme Percival
- Children: 3
- Family: Jack Agazarian (brother); Noel Agazarian (brother); Yvonne Agazarian (sister)

Marie Monique Jacqueline Agazarian (17 July 1920 – 3 March 1993) was an English pilot. She began her career serving in the Air Transport Auxiliary during World War II and became a civil pilot after the war. As of 1956, she was one of only 7 women flying commercially. Agazarian was considered a pioneer of flight simulators.

== Early life ==
Agazarian was born in Epsom to an Armenian father Berge Agazarian, who arrived in Liverpool escaping persecution in 1911, and a French mother Jacqueline Le Chevalier; the couple met while Le Chevalier was studying in London. Agazarian had four brothers, including Jack and Noel, and a sister Yvonne. The family had a Sopwith Pup in their garden. Agazarian attended the Convent of the Sacred Heart in Roehampton and a finishing school in Paris. She had begun her studies at the Royal Academy of Dramatic Art (RADA) when World War II broke out in 1939.

== Career ==
At the start of World War II, Agazarian joined the Red Cross Voluntary Aid Detachment (VAD) as a nurse while three of her brothers joined the Royal Air Force (RAF). In 1943, despite being an inch short of the required height, Agazarian was one of only 10 women accepted to the Air Transport Auxiliary's training programme. Their job was to send replacement aircraft out to operational squadrons. Upon earning her pilot badge, Agazarian reportedly "flew every type of front-line fighter then in service", particularly Spitfires, accumulating 500 wartime hours.

After the war, Agazarian earned her B license for commercial flying and, at the London School of Aviation, pursued a navigator's certificate. In 1947, Agazarian and fellow aviator Cecile Power were hired by Island Air Charters / Island Air Services (IAS), which operated leisure/charter flights out of Heathrow and Croydon airports via a fleet of de Havilland Dragon Rapides. Within a year, Agazarian had flown over 13 thousand passengers. Agazarian would be appointed Managing Director of IAS in 1948, Chairman and Chief Pilot. She also worked with her then husband Ray Rendall. By 1954, she had flown over 30 thousand passengers on the service. Clientele included Michael Wilding and Elizabeth Taylor. As of 1956, Agazarian was one of only 7 women flying commercially. Agazarian competed in the 1950 and 1952 King's Cup.

After IAS ceased its operations in 1959, Agazarian joined Air Service Training (AST), where she was considered a pioneer in the use of GAT-1 flight simulators in ab initio pilot training. Running a simulator complex in the basement of the Piccadilly Hotel, this method "[established] that many people could be trained to fly an aeroplane safely, confidently and in a surprisingly short period of time". In 1988, she authored a manual on titled Instrument Flying and Background to the Instrument and IMC Ratings.

== Personal life ==
Having met at the London School of Aviation two years prior, in July 1949, Agazarian married Raymond Charles "Ray" Rendall at the Brompton Oratory. They had three daughters. Agazarian continued to fly through her pregnancies and would bring her young daughters and dog up in the air. The couple divorced in 1973. After the divorce, Agazarian entered a relationship with Graeme Percival until his death. In her later life, Agazarian lived at 84 Park Mansions, Knightsbridge.

== Bibliography ==
- Instrument Flying and Background to the Instrument and IMC Ratings (1988)
