= Group psychotherapy =

Form of psychotherapy treatment

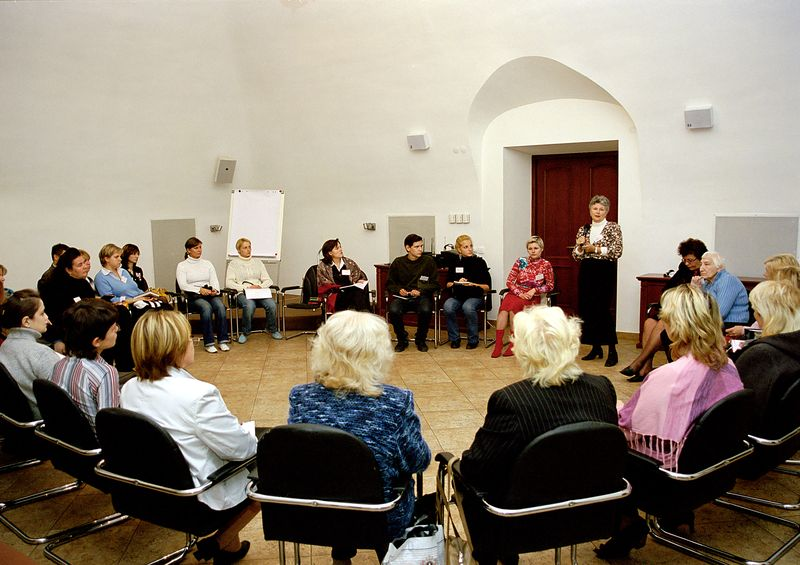
- ICD-10-PCS: GZH
- ICD-9-CM: 94.41-94.44
- MeSH: D011615

Group psychotherapy or group therapy is a form of psychotherapy in which one or more therapists treat a small group of clients together as a group. The term can legitimately refer to any form of psychotherapy when delivered in a group format, including art therapy, cognitive behavioral therapy or interpersonal therapy, but it is usually applied to psychodynamic group therapy where the group context and group process is explicitly utilized as a mechanism of change by developing, exploring and examining interpersonal relationships within the group.

The broader concept of group therapy can be taken to include any helping process that takes place in a group, including support groups, skills training groups (such as anger management, mindfulness, relaxation training or social skills training), and psychoeducation groups. The differences between psychodynamic groups, activity groups, support groups, problem-solving and psychoeducational groups have been discussed by psychiatrist Charles Montgomery. Other, more specialized forms of group therapy would include non-verbal expressive therapies such as art therapy, dance therapy, or music therapy.

== History ==
The founders of group psychotherapy in the United States were Joseph H. Pratt, Trigant Burrow and Paul Schilder. All three of them were active and working at the East Coast in the first half of the 20th century. In 1932 Jacob L. Moreno presented his work on group psychotherapy to the American Psychiatric Association, and co-authored a monograph on the subject. After World War II, group psychotherapy was further developed by Moreno, Rudolf Dreikurs, Samuel Slavson, Hyman Spotnitz, Irvin Yalom, and Lou Ormont. Yalom's approach to group therapy has been very influential not only in the USA but across the world.

An early development in group therapy was the T-group or training group (sometimes also referred to as sensitivity-training group, human relations training group or encounter group), a form of group psychotherapy where participants (typically, between eight and 15 people) learn about themselves (and about small group processes in general) through their interaction with each other. They use feedback, problem solving, and role play to gain insights into themselves, others, and groups. It was pioneered in the mid-1940s by Kurt Lewin and Carl Rogers and his colleagues as a method of learning about human behavior in what became the National Training Laboratories (also known as the NTL Institute) that was created by the Office of Naval Research and the National Education Association in Bethel, Maine, in 1947.

Moreno developed a specific and highly structured form of group therapy known as psychodrama (although the entry on psychodrama claims it is not a form of group therapy). Another recent development in the theory and method of group psychotherapy based on an integration of systems thinking is Yvonne Agazarian's systems-centered therapy (SCT), which sees groups functioning within the principles of system dynamics. Her method of "functional subgrouping" introduces a method of organizing group communication so it is less likely to react counterproductively to differences. SCT also emphasizes the need to recognize the phases of group development and the defenses related to each phase in order to best make sense and influence group dynamics.

In the United Kingdom group psychotherapy initially developed independently, with pioneers S. H. Foulkes and Wilfred Bion using group therapy as an approach to treating combat fatigue in the Second World War. Foulkes and Bion were psychoanalysts and incorporated psychoanalysis into group therapy by recognising that transference can arise not only between group members and the therapist but also among group members. Furthermore, the psychoanalytic concept of the unconscious was extended with a recognition of a group unconscious, in which the unconscious processes of group members could be acted out in the form of irrational processes in group sessions. Foulkes developed the model known as group analysis and the Institute of Group Analysis, while Bion was influential in the development of group therapy at the Tavistock Clinic.

Bion's approach is comparable to social therapy, first developed in the United States in the late 1970s by Lois Holzman and Fred Newman, which is a group therapy in which practitioners relate to the group, not its individuals, as the fundamental unit of development. The task of the group is to "build the group" rather than focus on problem solving or "fixing" individuals.

In Argentina an independent school of group analysis stemmed from the work and teachings of Swiss-born Argentine psychoanalyst Enrique Pichon-Rivière. This thinker conceived of a group-centered approach which, although not directly influenced by Foulkes' work, was fully compatible with it.

== Therapeutic principles ==
Irvin Yalom proposed a number of therapeutic factors (originally termed curative factors but renamed therapeutic factors in the 5th edition of The Theory and Practice of Group Psychotherapy (1st edition 1970, 5th edition 2005).

- Universality

The recognition of shared experiences and feelings among group members and that these may be widespread or universal human concerns, serves to remove a group member's sense of isolation, validate their experiences, and raise self-esteem

- Altruism

The group is a place where members can help each other, and the experience of being able to give something to another person can lift the member's self esteem and help develop more adaptive coping styles and interpersonal skills.

- Instillation of hope

In a mixed group that has members at various stages of development or recovery, a member can be inspired and encouraged by another member who has overcome the problems with which they are still struggling.

- Imparting information

While this is not strictly speaking a psychotherapeutic process, members often report that it has been very helpful to learn factual information from other members in the group. For example, about their treatment or about access to services.

- Corrective recapitulation of the primary family experience

Members often unconsciously identify the group therapist and other group members with their own parents and siblings in a process that is a form of transference specific to group psychotherapy. The therapist's interpretations can help group members gain understanding of the impact of childhood experiences on their personality, and they may learn to avoid unconsciously repeating unhelpful past interactive patterns in present-day relationships.

- Development of socializing techniques

The group setting provides a safe and supportive environment for members to take risks by extending their repertoire of interpersonal behaviour and improving their social skills

- Imitative behaviour

One way in which group members can develop social skills is through a modeling process, observing and imitating the therapist and other group members. For example, sharing personal feelings, showing concern, and supporting others.

- Cohesiveness

It has been suggested that this is the primary therapeutic factor from which all others flow. Humans are herd animals with an instinctive need to belong to groups, and personal development can only take place in an interpersonal context. A cohesive group is one in which all members feel a sense of belonging, acceptance, and validation.

- Existential factors

Learning that one has to take responsibility for one's own life and the consequences of one's decisions.

- Catharsis

Catharsis is the experience of relief from emotional distress through the free and uninhibited expression of emotion. When members tell their story to a supportive audience, they can obtain relief from chronic feelings of shame and guilt.

- Interpersonal learning

Group members achieve a greater level of self-awareness through the process of interacting with others in the group, who give feedback on the member's behaviour and impact on others.

- Self-understanding

This factor overlaps with interpersonal learning but refers to the achievement of greater levels of insight into the genesis of one's problems and the unconscious motivations that underlie one's behaviour.

== Settings ==
Group therapy can form part of the therapeutic milieu of a psychiatric in-patient unit or ambulatory psychiatric partial hospitalization (also known as day hospital treatment). In addition to classical "talking" therapy, group therapy in an institutional setting can also include group-based expressive therapies such as drama therapy, psychodrama, art therapy, and non-verbal types of therapy such as music therapy and dance/movement therapy.

Group psychotherapy is a key component of milieu therapy in a therapeutic community. The total environment or milieu is regarded as the medium of therapy, all interactions and activities regarded as potentially therapeutic and are subject to exploration and interpretation, and are explored in daily or weekly community meetings. However, interactions between the culture of group psychotherapeutic settings and the more managerial norms of external authorities may create 'organizational turbulence' which can critically undermine a group's ability to maintain a safe yet challenging 'formative space'. Academics at the University of Oxford studied the inter-organizational dynamics of a national democratic therapeutic community over a period of four years; they found external steering by authorities eroded the community's therapeutic model, produced a crisis, and led to an intractable conflict which resulted in the community's closure.

A form of group therapy has been reported to be effective in psychotic adolescents and recovering addicts. Projective psychotherapy uses an outside text such as a novel or motion picture to provide a "stable delusion" for the former cohort and a safe focus for repressed and suppressed emotions or thoughts in the latter. Patient groups read a novel or collectively view a film. They then participate collectively in the discussion of plot, character motivation and author motivation. In the case of films, sound track, cinematography and background are also discussed and processed. Under the guidance of the therapist, defense mechanisms are bypassed by the use of signifiers and semiotic processes. The focus remains on the text rather than on personal issues. It was popularized in the science fiction novel, Red Orc's Rage.

Group therapy is now often utilized in private practice settings.

Group analysis has become widespread in Europe, and especially the United Kingdom, where it has become the most common form of group psychotherapy. Interest from Australia, the former Soviet Union and the African continent is also growing.

Psychedelic-assisted group psychotherapy can be more cost-efficient in comparison to individual psychedelic-assisted psychotherapy models, because therapists can split the costs among all participants of the group.

== Research on effectiveness ==
A 2008 meta-analysis found that individual therapy may be slightly more effective than group therapy initially, but this difference seems to disappear after 6 months. There is clear evidence for the effectiveness of group psychotherapy for depression: a meta-analysis of 48 studies showed an overall effect size of 1.03, which is clinically highly significant. Similarly, a meta-analysis of five studies of group psychotherapy for adult sexual abuse survivors showed moderate to strong effect sizes, and there is also good evidence for effectiveness with chronic traumatic stress in war veterans.

There is less robust evidence of good outcomes for patients with borderline personality disorder, with some studies showing only small to moderate effect sizes. The authors comment that these poor outcomes might reflect a need for additional support for some patients, in addition to the group therapy. This is borne out by the impressive results obtained using mentalization-based treatment, a model that combines dynamic group psychotherapy with individual psychotherapy and case management.

Most outcome research is carried out using time-limited therapy with diagnostically homogenous groups. However, long-term intensive interactional group psychotherapy assumes diverse and diagnostically heterogeneous group membership, and an open-ended time scale for therapy. Good outcomes have also been demonstrated for this form of group therapy.

Some researchers highlight that group‑based therapy can help mitigate therapist shortages by allowing clinicians to work with multiple patients simultaneously.

== Computer-supported group therapy ==
Research on computer-supported and computer-based interventions has increased significantly since the mid-1990s. For a comprehensive overview of current practices see: Computer-supported psychotherapy.

Several feasibility studies examined the impact of computer-, app- and media-support on group interventions. Most investigated interventions implemented short rationales, which usually were based on principles of cognitive behaviour therapy (CBT). Most research focussed on:

- Anxiety disorders (e.g. social phobia, generalised anxiety disorder)
- Depression (e.g. mild to moderate Major Depression)
- Other disorders (e.g. hoarding)

While the evidence base for group therapy is very limited, preliminary research in individual therapy suggests possible increases of treatment efficiency or effectiveness. Further, the use of app- or computer-based monitoring has been investigated several times. Reported advantages of the modern format include improved between-session transfer and patient-therapist-communication, as well as increased treatment transparency and intensity. Negative effects may occur in terms of dissonance due to non-compliance with online tasks, or the constriction of in-session group interaction. Last but not least, group phenomena might influence the motivation to engage with online tasks.

== See also ==
- Family therapy
- Henry Ezriel
- Self-help groups for mental health
- Twelve-step program
- Impact therapy
- American Group Psychotherapy Association, founded in 1943
