= Henry Spotnitz =

American surgeon

Henry M. Spotnitz is George H. Humphrey II Professor of Surgery, chairman of the Columbia University Medical Center Conflict of Interest Committee, co-chair of the NewYork-Presbyterian Hospital Information Systems Clinical Advisory Committee, chair of the Information Technology Committee of the Faculty Practice Organization, and Vice-Chair for Research and Information Systems in the Department of Surgery.

Supported by National Institutes of Health funding, Spotnitz pioneered quantitative echo studies during cardiac surgery. This research has documented substantial improvements in cardiac output among heart surgery patients undergoing biventricular pacing (also known as cardiac resynchronization therapy), which involves installation of pacemakers to fix delays in heart ventricle contractions and keeps the left/right ventricles pumping together (CUMC 2007). He graduated from Harvard College and the Columbia University Vagelos College of Physicians and Surgeons.

== Current research ==
Spotnitz has been awarded a five-year grant from the National Heart, Lung, and Blood Institute to study the effects of biventricular pacing on heart function after cardiac surgery (CUMC 2007). The first of two trials being conducted by Spotnitz investigates the use of biventricular pacing in patients who develop acute heart failure. The second seeks to maximize the effectiveness of the biventricular pacemaker by altering the location of pacemaker lead wires and the timing of their electrical stimulation (CUMC 2006).

== Selected publications ==
- Diastolic properties predict short-term postoperative risk and duration of pleural effusions after the fontan operation. Garofalo CA, Cabreriza SE, Quinn TA, Weinberg AD, Quaegebeur JM, Spotnitz HM, Mosca RS. Circulation. 114(1 Suppl):I56-61. 4 July 2006.
- Left ventricular pacing site-timing optimization during biventricular pacing using a multielectrode patch. Berberian G, Cabreriza SE, Quinn TA, Garofalo CA, Spotnitz HM. Ann. Th. Surg. 82(6):2292-4. Dec 2006.
- Surgical Considerations of Pacemakers and Automatic Defibrillators, in Cohn L, Cardiac Surgery in the Adult. Spotnitz HM. 2nd Ed., McGraw-Hill, 2003.
- Booth JH, Quinn TA, Richmond ME, Cabreriza SE, Weinberg AD, Johnston T, Spotnitz HM. Cardiac output measurement by arterial pressure waveform analysis during optimization of biventricular pacing after cardiac surgery. ASAIO J 2009 Nov-Dec;55(6):587-91.
- Quinn TA, Cabreriza SE, Richmond ME, Weinberg AD, Holmes JW, Spotnitz HM. Simultaneous variation of ventricular pacing site and timing with biventricular pacing in acute ventricular failure improves function by interventricular assist. Am J Physiol Heart Circ Physiol 2009 Dec; 297(6): H2220-6.
- Spotnitz HM. Ventricular function in surgery for congenital Heart Disease. World J of Surg [Epub ahead of print 2009 Nov 17].
- Rusanov A, Spotnitz HM. 15-year experience with permanent pacemaker and defibrillator lead and patch extractions. Ann Thorac Surg 2010;89:44-50.
- Bonney WJ, Spotnitz HM, Liberman L, Silver ES, Ceresnak SR, Hordof AJ, Pass RH. Survival of transvenous ICD leads in young patients. Pacing Clin Electrophysiol 2010;33:186-91.
- George E, Cabreriza SE, Quinn TA, Rusanov A, Gerrah R, Broyles JM, Weinberg AD, Spotnitz HM. Validation of automated monitoring of cardiac output for biventricular pacing optimization. ASAIO J. Abstract. 2010; 56:265–269.
- Gray RG, Cabreriza SE, Quinn TA, Weinberg AD, Spotnitz HM. Feasibility of in vivo pressure measurement using a pressure-tip catheter via transventricular puncture. 2010; 56:194–199.
- Spotnitz ME, Richmond ME, Quinn TA, Cabreriza SE, Wang DY, Albright CM, Weinberg AD, Dizon JM, Spotnitz HM. Relation of cardiac output to QRS duration during temporary resynchronization therapy after cardiac surgery. ASAIO J. 2010; Epub ahead of print
