= American Group Psychotherapy Association =

Organization

The American Group Psychotherapy Association (AGPA) is a not-for-profit multi-disciplinary organization dedicated to enhancing the practice, theory and research of group psychotherapy.

== Membership ==
American Group Psychotherapy Association is a national organization with over 2000 members internationally and 31 affiliate societies. Members come from disciplines such as psychology, creative art therapy, psychiatry, nursing, social work, professional counseling, addictions, and marriage and family therapy. AGPA's annual meeting attracts approximately 1000 attendees.

== History ==
The inception of the American Group Psychotherapy Association began in 1942 with the actual decision to found the organization being made in February 1943 during a meeting of the American Orthopsychiatric Association in New York City. The organization was first named the American Group Therapy Association. In 1952, the name was officially changed to the American Group Psychotherapy Association. Samuel R. Slavson was one of the founders and served as the first president of the AGPA.

== Certification ==
The International Board for Certification of Group Psychotherapists is a not-for-profit corporation formed to function autonomously from AGPA. The International Board for Certification of Group Psychotherapists (IBCGP) awards group therapists certification after they have presented documentation demonstrating the completion of a significant amount of training through coursework, experience, and supervision. A Certified Group Psychotherapist (CGP) is also required to continue lifelong learning by obtaining continuing education credits (CEU's) in effective leadership of psychotherapy groups.

== Organizational involvement ==
The diversity of AGPA membership has been actively involved in the promotion of group therapy as an alternative treatment to the public and private sectors. The development of ethical and practice standards. AGPA membership has also responded to the nation's disasters; for example, September 11 and Hurricane Katrina. AGPA has also developed a set of standards of practice for group therapy for use by practitioners. This resource assists the clinician in the development of evidence-based and best practices. AGPA does not de-certify its members or monitor its membership for quality of practice, instead, they go by the state licensing. The only time an AGPA member would lose their CGP certification is if their license was suspended by their state's board of psychologists.
