= William D. Spotnitz =

William D. Spotnitz M.D., MBA
- Education: Harvard University, BS; Columbia University, MD; University of Florida, MBA
- Employer: University of Virginia Health System

William D. Spotnitz is a cardiothoracic surgeon and medical researcher who has made significant contributions to the development and testing of surgical techniques. He is a notable researcher in the United States in use of fibrin glue (a surgical adhesive used to create hemostasis). Spotnitz serves as a heart surgeon in the University of Virginia Health System. He also previously served as the director of the hospital's Tissue Adhesive Center, which promoted and advanced the use of adhesives in surgery. He currently serves as the director of the Surgical Therapeutic Advancement Center, a successor program conducting more generalized research in surgical procedures.

Spotnitz earned his bachelor's in chemistry from Harvard University and his medical degree from Columbia University College of Physicians and Surgeons. In 2007, he earned an MBA from the University of Florida. For his contributions in the “development of tissue adhesives for surgical use”, Spotnitz was inducted into the 2004 class of the College of Fellows of the American Institute for Medical and Biological Engineering.

== Selected publications ==
- Shaffrey, Christopher I.; Spotnitz, William D.; Shaffrey, Mark E.; Jane, John A. (1990-02-01). "Neurosurgical Applications of Fibrin Glue: Augmentation of Dural Closure in 134 Patients". Neurosurgery. 26 (2): 207–210. doi:10.1227/00006123-199002000-00004.
- Kaul, S.; Spotnitz, W. D.; Glasheen, W. P.; Touchstone, D. A. (1991-11-01). "Mechanism of ischemic mitral regurgitation. An experimental evaluation". Circulation. 84 (5): 2167–2180. doi:10.1161/01.CIR.84.5.2167. PMID 1934385.
- Spotnitz, William D.; Falstrom, Jeanne K.; Rodeheaver, George T. (1997-06-01). "The Role of Sutures and Fibrin Sealant in Wound Healing". Surgical Clinics. 77 (3): 651–669. doi:10.1016/S0039-6109(05)70573-9.
- Spotnitz, William D (2001-08-01). "Commercial fibrin sealants in surgical care". The American Journal of Surgery. Developing Surgical Techniques: The Role of Fibrin Sealants. 182 (2, Supplement 1): S8 – S14. doi:10.1016/S0002-9610(01)00771-1.
- Spotnitz, William D.; Prabhu, Roshan (2005). "Fibrin Sealant Tissue Adhesive−Review and Update". Journal of Long-Term Effects of Medical Implants. 15 (3): 245–270. doi:10.1615/JLongTermEffMedImplants.v15.i3.20.
- Spotnitz, William D.; Burks, Sandra (2008-07-01). "Hemostats, sealants, and adhesives: components of the surgical toolbox". Transfusion. 48 (7): 1502–1516. doi:10.1111/j.1537-2995.2008.01703.x. PMID 18422855.
- Spotnitz, William D. (2010-04-01). "Fibrin Sealant: Past, Present, and Future: A Brief Review". World Journal of Surgery. 34 (4): 632–634. doi:10.1007/s00268-009-0252-7. PMID 19820991.
