= Francine Agazarian =

Special Operations Executive Agent

- Born: Françoise Isabella Andre; 8 May 1913; Narbonne, France
- Died: 24 June 1998 (aged 85)
- Relatives: Jack Agazarian (husband); Noel Agazarian (brother–in–law)
- Military career
- Allegiance: United Kingdom; France
- Branch: Special Operations Executive; French Resistance
- Service years: 1943-1944
- Rank: SOE courier
- Nickname: Marguerite
- Commands: Prosper

Françoise Isabella Agazarian (née Andre; 8 May 1913 – 24 June 1998), code named Marguerite, was an agent of the United Kingdom's clandestine Special Operations Executive (SOE) in France during World War II. The purpose of SOE was to conduct espionage, sabotage, and reconnaissance in countries occupied by Nazi Germany and other Axis powers. SOE agents allied themselves with French Resistance groups and supplied them with weapons and equipment parachuted in from England. Agazarian was a courier for the Prosper network based in Paris.

Agazarian was the wife of Jack Agazarian, also a SOE agent for Prosper in Paris.

== Early life ==
Francine Andre was born in France. She was an English-speaking secretary when World War II began. She made a marriage of convenience to a British soldier who had escaped capture by the German conquerors of France and traveled with him to England in September 1941. She discovered that her "husband" was already married. In late 1942 she married Jack Agazarian, a naturalized British citizen. Both of them joined SOE.

== SOE ==
Francine Agazarian traveled to France on a clandestine flight of a Lysander which landed on a farm field on the night 17/18 March 1943. Claude de Baissac and France Antelme arrived on the same airplane. She was joining her husband Jack Agazarian and the Prosper network as a courier based in Paris. It was unusual for a married couple to work for the same network; after the war Francine clarified the situation:

Although in the same network, my husband and I were not working together; as a radio operator he worked alone and transmitted from different locations every day. I was only responsible to Prosper (Francis Suttill) whom we all called Francois. He liked to use me for special errands because, France being my native land, I could get away from difficulties easily enough, particularly when dealing with officialdom.

Francois was an outstanding leader, clear-headed, precise, confident. I liked working on his instructions, and I enjoyed the small challenges he was placing in front of me. For instance calling at town halls in various districts of Paris to exchange the network's expired ration cards (manufactured in London) for genuine new ones. Mainly I was delivering his messages to his helpers: in Paris, in villages, or isolated houses in the countryside. From time to time I was also delivering demolition material received from England. And once, with hand-grenades in my shopping bag, I travelled in a train so full that I had to stand against a German NCO. This odd situation was not new to me. I had already experienced it for the first time on the day of my arrival on French soil, when I had to travel by train from Poitiers to Paris. A very full train also. I sat on my small suitcase in the corridor, a uniformed German standing close against me. But, that first time, tied to my waist, under my clothes, was a wide black cloth belt containing bank-notes for Prosper, a number of blank identity cards and a number of ration cards; while tucked into the sleeves of my coat were crystals for Prosper's radio transmitters; the crystals had been skillfully secured to my sleeves by Vera Atkins herself, before my departure from Orchard Court. My .32 revolver and ammunition were in my suitcase. The ludicrousness of the situation somehow eliminated any thoughts of danger. In any case, I believe none of us in the field ever gave one thought to danger. Germans were everywhere, especially in Paris; one absorbed the sight of them and went on with the job of living as ordinarily as possible and applying oneself to one's work.

Because I worked alone, the times I liked best were when we could be together, Prosper (Francis Suttill), Denise (Andrée Borrel), Archambaud (Gilbert Norman), Marcel (Jack Agazarian) and I, sitting round a table, while I was decoding radio messages from London; we were always hoping to read the exciting warning to stand by, which would have meant that the liberating invasion from England was imminent.

Despite Agazarian's favorable recollections of her work and her colleagues, she was frail and exhausted after less than three months in France. Moreover, her husband Jack and Francis Suttill were at odds with each other. Suttill believed that Agazarian was encroaching on his authority. Agazarian on his part questioned the loyalty of Suttill's air operations officer, Henri Déricourt. (He was later proven correct.) On the night of 16/17 June 1943, the couple returned to England on a Lysander flight. It was fortunate timing as the Germans began arresting SOE agents associated with Prosper less than a week later. However, Jack Agazarian returned to France in July and was captured and later executed by the Germans.

== Post war ==
After the war, Francine Agazarian settled in London. She suffered from guilt about her husband's death. In 1967, she visited Flossenburg concentration camp where her husband was executed. Vera Atkins, a senior official of SOE, consoled and supported her with money for many years. She wrote to Atkins: "For many years I felt it was not right that I was alive. I should have gone when they did and in the same manner."

== Awards ==
Francine Agazarian was Mentioned in Dispatches for her actions in France; her husband was also Mentioned in Dispatches and was posthumously awarded the Légion d'honneur and Croix de Guerre.

1939–1945 Star	France and Germany Star	War Medal with Mentioned in Dispatches
