= Hyman Spotnitz =

American psychiatrist (1908–2008)

Hyman Spotnitz (September 29, 1908 – April 18, 2008) was an American psychoanalyst and psychiatrist who pioneered an approach to working psychoanalytically with patients with schizophrenia in the 1950s called Modern psychoanalysis. He also was one of many clinicians practicing at the time interested in group therapy.

== Background and education ==
Born in Boston to immigrant parents, Spotnitz attended Harvard College and received a degree in medicine from Friedrich Wilhelms University in Berlin in 1934. He continued his medical studies at the College of Physicians and Surgeons, Columbia University, earning a Medical Science degree in neurology in 1939. His initial work on schizophrenia was conducted while a consulting psychiatrist for the Jewish Board of Guardians in New York City.

At the time, most psychoanalysts did not think that schizophrenia was treatable through therapy and group approaches were not popular. His approach was considered controversial. His clinical work was deemed unpassable by the New York Psychoanalytic Institute where he was training and he left to continue to develop his work.

On April 18, 2008 he died in New York City of natural causes.

== Theory of technique ==
Spotnitz's treatment approach emphasizes the development of the narcissistic transference in which the patient relates to the therapist as if he were part of his own mind, rather than a separate person. Some have criticized this approach because it contradicts a general aim of psychotherapy, which is to promote self-other boundaries. He theorizes that most neuroses and severe mental illnesses originate in the preoedipal period, before the development of language. The transference that develops with these patients then is largely enacted nonverbally through behavior, symptoms, symbolic communications and, importantly, the transmission of feeling states, otherwise known as induced feelings. Spotnitz feels that the "narcissistic defense" is central to most mental disturbances and is characterized by self-hate rather than self-love. Aggression is directed towards the self in order to protect the object. Treatment then emphasizes helping patients to better metabolize their aggressive drives, by gradually being able to express their aggression in treatment. Spotnitz emphasized initially joining with the patient's resistance, rather than challenging, and using the countertransference feelings of the therapist to help understand the patient. His central focus on the objective, and hence clinically useful nature of the therapist's countertransference was later taken up by self psychology and intersubjective approaches to psychoanalysis. Also foreshadowing later developments in other schools (as did schools in the U.K. that preceded him,) Spotnitz's approach to the analyst's interventions are primarily intended to provide an emotional-maturational communication to the patient, rather than to promote intellectual insight. With this technique he was able to cure many patients previously deemed incurable by the psychoanalytic world.

Group therapy

Spotnitz began developing modern psychoanalysis and psychoanalytic group therapy during the time he served as consulting psychiatrist at the Jewish Board of Guardians in the mid-1940s and 50’s. His closest students and collaborators at the time were Yonata Feldman and Leo Nagelberg. The work centered on developing a new psychotherapeutic method for the treatment of narcissistic disorders, starting with schizophrenia and borderline conditions. The caseworkers who were employed by the JBG found that Spotnitz’s supervision helped them to achieve excellent results in treating severely emotionally disturbed children and their families. They were the first to embrace the school that came to be known as Modern Psychoanalysis: Evelyn Abrams, Leslie Rosenthal, Sidney and Shirley Love, and others. These early followers became the first teachers and supervisors. Not long thereafter they were followed by Avivah Sayres, Selwyn Brody, Phyllis W. Meadow, Evelyn Liegner, Leonard Liegner, Fanny Milstein, Lou Ormont, Benjamin Margolis, Ethel Clevans, Marie Coleman Nelson, Arnold Bernstein, Murray Sherman, Stanley Hayden, Gerald M. Fishbein, Harold Stern, Jacob Kesten, Jacob Kirman, William Kirman, Robert Marshall, Harold Davis, Charles and Deborah Greene Bershatsky, Adrienne Fischer and many others too numerous to mention.

Spotnitz was also one of the first psychoanalysts to advocate the use of groups. His approach to group treatment, also originally developed with schizophrenic clients, emphasized the therapist's use of his or her feelings induced by the group, and joining and reflecting rather than directly challenging group resistances. Spotnitz's work in psychoanalytic group therapy and in modern psychoanalysis in general has been continued and furthered by Stanley Hayden, Charles and Deborah Greene Bershatsky, Leo Nagelberg, Lou Ormont, Leslie Rosenthal, Phyllis Meadow, Michael Brook, Bob Unger, Gerald Lucas and Marie Lucas, among many others. Spotnitz focused on analysis of group resistances rather than individual resistances. He has been the honorary president of more than 10 psychoanalytic institutes throughout the United States, including the Academy of Clinical and Applied Psychoanalysis, Boston Graduate School of Psychoanalysis, California Graduate Institute, Center for Modern Psychoanalytic Studies, New Jersey Center for Modern Psychoanalysis, The Mid-Manhattan Institute for Psychoanalysis, and the Hattie R. Rosenthal College of Psychoanalysis.

== See also ==
- Sigmund Freud
- Psychoanalysis
- Group therapy

== Works ==
- The Couch and The Circle: A Story of Group Psychotherapy, Alfred A. Knopf, Inc., 1961, ISBN 978-0-9703923-6-7
- Modern Psychoanalysis of the Schizophrenic Patient: Theory of The Technique, Grune & Stratton 1969, YBK Publishers 2004, ISBN 0-9703923-6-2
- Treatment of the Narcissistic Neuroses, with Phyllis W. Meadow, Jason Aronson, 1976, 1995, ISBN 978-1-56821-416-0
- Psychotherapy of Preoedipal Conditions: Schizophrenia and Severe Character Disorders, Jason Aronson, 1976, 1995, ISBN 978-1-56821-633-1
- Just Say Everything: A Festschirft in Honor of Hyman Spotnitz, by Sara Sheftel, Assn for Modern Psychoanalysis, 1991, ISBN 978-0-9624534-0-3
