= Acroma =

Acroma عكرمة `Akramah
- Town
- Location in Libya
- Coordinates: 32°03′10″N 23°41′56″E
- Country: Libya
- District: Butnan
- Elevation: 143 m (469 ft)
- Time zone: UTC+2 (EET)

Acroma (also Akramah and Ikrimah) is a town in northeastern Libya in Butnan District, about 28 km west of Tobruk.

On April 17, 1917, the Treaty of Acroma, was signed by the Italian government (as occupying, colonial power) and Mohammed Idris (head of Senussi). The pact was an ambiguous ceasefire recognizing a de facto authority for Idris in Cyrenaica, while not excluding the overall Italian territorial sovereignty.

== World War II ==
During the North African Campaign of World War II, the area was the scene of heavy fighting on several separate occasions. Acroma was captured from Axis forces on December 10, 1941, by the Polish Independent Carpathian Rifle Brigade.

Later, an intersection of two Bedouin paths 19 kilometres (12 mi) south of Acroma, assumed strategic importance, and became known by the Allied codename Knightsbridge. The area was the focus of the Battle of Knightsbridge, during June 1942.

Following the war's end, Knightsbridge War Cemetery, containing Allied war dead, was built 6.5 kilometres (4.0 mi) north of Acroma, near the main road linking Tobruk and Gazala.
