= Sigmund Freud Institute =

Psychoanalysis research institute in Frankfurt, Germany

The Sigmund Freud Institute (SFI) is a research institute for psychoanalysis located in Frankfurt, Germany. It was established in 1960 as an institute and training center for psychoanalysis and psychosomatic medicine. Renamed in 1964, it is now called after Sigmund Freud, the founder of psychoanalysis. Since 1995, the institution has been dedicated entirely to research.

== Purpose ==
The declared aims of the Sigmund Freud Institute (SFI) are both research on social psychology/sociology, psychology and medicine/psychosomatic and also promotion of young scientists. The research is focused on the psychic effects of societal change, the foundations of psychoanalysis, prevention and psychotherapy research, and psychoanalytic and sociology-psychological analyses of present-day developments. The Sigmund Freud Institute past and present, has brought to fruition numerous research projects of a clinical, psychoanalytic, sociology-psychological or trans-disciplinary nature.

== History ==
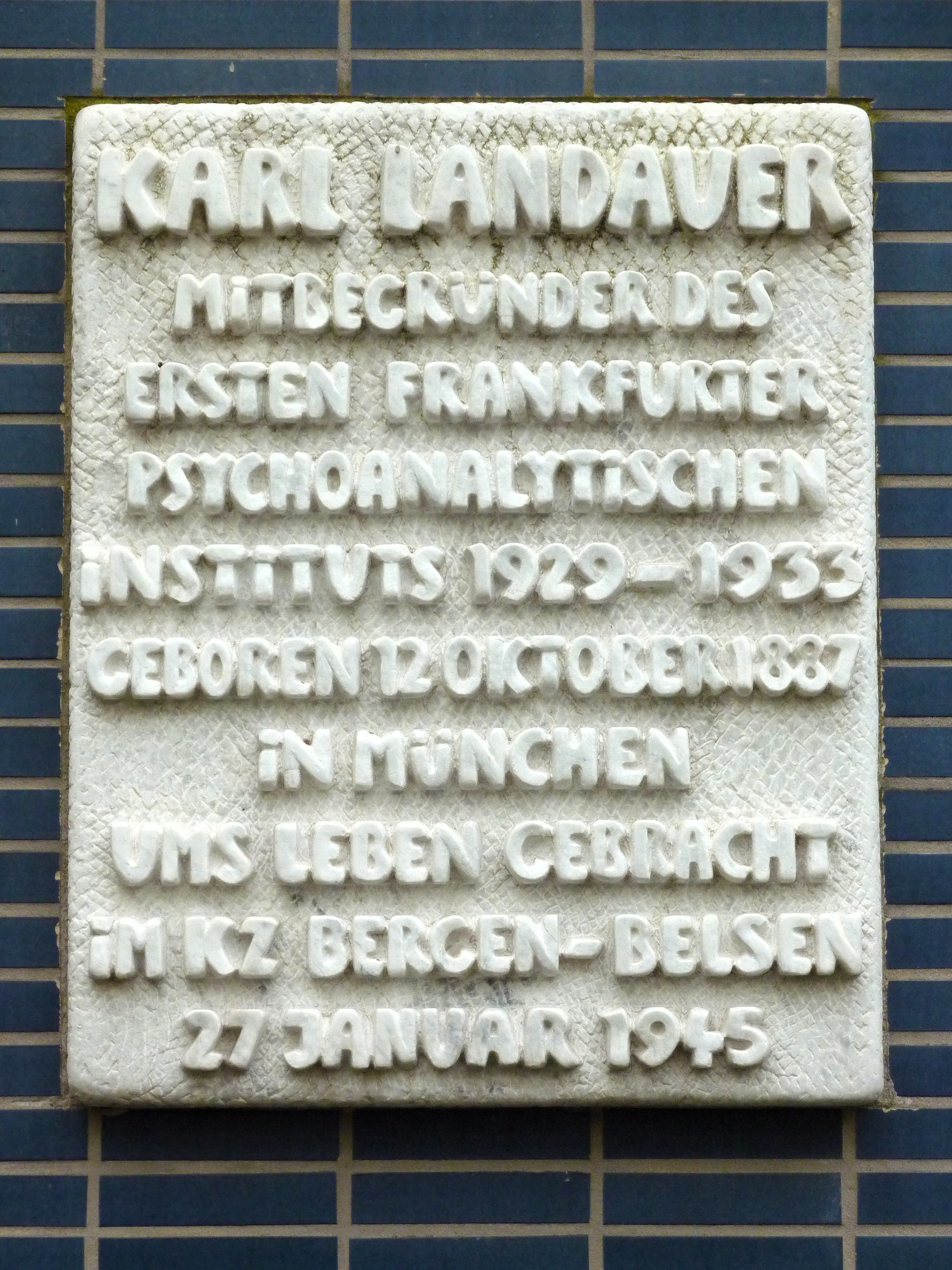
Memorial plaque for Karl Landauer on the façade of the Sigmund Freud Institute

As early as 1929–1933, the city already had a psychoanalytic research group, from which the Frankfurt Psychoanalytic Institute emerged. Among its founders and staff were psychoanalysts like Karl Landauer, Heinrich Meng, Frieda Fromm-Reichmann, Erich Fromm and Siegmund Fuchs (who later called himself S.H. Foulkes). In 1933, after the seizure of power by the National Socialists, the Psychoanalytic Institute was closed down. All five analysts working there went into exile. Landauer fled to the Netherlands, where he was captured by the German occupying forces. In January 1945 he died in the Bergen-Belsen concentration camp from the effects of his incarceration there.

On 27 April 1960, the Institute and Training Centre for Psychoanalysis and Psychosomatic Medicine was officially established. The new foundation had been supported by the social scientists Max Horkheimer and Theodor W. Adorno and in particular by the minister-president of Hesse, Georg-August Zinn.

Anna Freud hailed its opening as the beginning of a "new psychoanalytic era in Germany." The first director was Alexander Mitscherlich who in novel way combined the study of the unconscious with the social-psychological analysis of society. In 1964 the institute was renamed Sigmund Freud Institute. Alongside research and psycho-therapeutic care, the institution was dedicated to the training of doctors and psychologists wishing to become psychoanalysts. The training was carried out on the basis of the guidelines laid down by the German Psychoanalytic Association (German website) and the International Psychoanalytic Association. On 14 October 1964, the institute moved to Myliusstrasse 30 in the Westend district of Frankfurt.

The SFI retained its dual structure (training and research) until 1995. From 1959 to 1994 the institute had the legal status of a Landesbehörde (state authority/agency) under the aegis of the state of Hesse's Ministry of Science and the Arts.

After Mitscherlich left in 1976, the institute was headed successively by Clemens de Boor, Dieter Ohlmeier and Horst-Eberhard Richter, and Marianne Leuzinger-Bohleber and Rolf Haubl. Major figures teaching and researching at the SFI include Tobias Brocher, Hermann Argelander, Alfred Lorenzer, Klaus Horn and Helmut Dahmer. The present executive directors are Vera King and Patrick Meurs, Heinz Weiß is in charge of the outpatient department.

== Organisation ==
In 1995 the SFI was transformed into a public-law foundation and since then has dedicated itself exclusively to research, in close conjunction with the Universities of Frankfurt and Kassel. Funding for the foundation comes from the federal state of Hesse.

Since 1995 psychoanalytic training has been provided by independent Frankfurt (training) institutes. After the move to No. 20 Myliusstrasse in the Westend district of Frankfurt, a new Psychoanalytic Centre was established there, adding legally independent psychoanalytic institutions to the SFI under the same roof. These are the Frankfurt Psychoanalytic Institute, the Institute for Analytic Child and Adolescent Psychotherapy in Hesse, the Frankfurt Work Group for Psychoanalytic Pedagogy, and the Frankfurt am Main Jewish Psychotherapeutic Counselling Centre for Children, Adolescents, and Adults.

Since 2016 the executive directors have been Vera King (in the framework of a joint professorship for sociology and psychoanalytic social psychology with the University of Frankfurt), Patrick Meurs (in the framework of a joint professorship for psychoanalysis with the University of Kassel), and Heinz Weiß (chief physician at the Robert Bosch Hospital in Stuttgart).

== Research ==
The research activities of the institute can be differentiated into five research items). In all the ongoing projects the SFI tries to take up the specific tradition of this institution and to integrate it with the work of a contemporary psychoanalytic research institute.

- Social psychological analysis of the mental effects of cultural change (e.g. digitalization)
- Mental and psycho-social effects of flight and migration
- Basic research and enhancement of clinical and theoretical and general conceptual research in psychoanalysis
- Research on psychotherapy, prevention, counseling, supply, and evaluation
- Generations research, especially research on transgenerational traditioning processes of traumata, the effects of National Socialism, violence and extremism
