= Hans Bosse =

German sociologist (1938–2023)

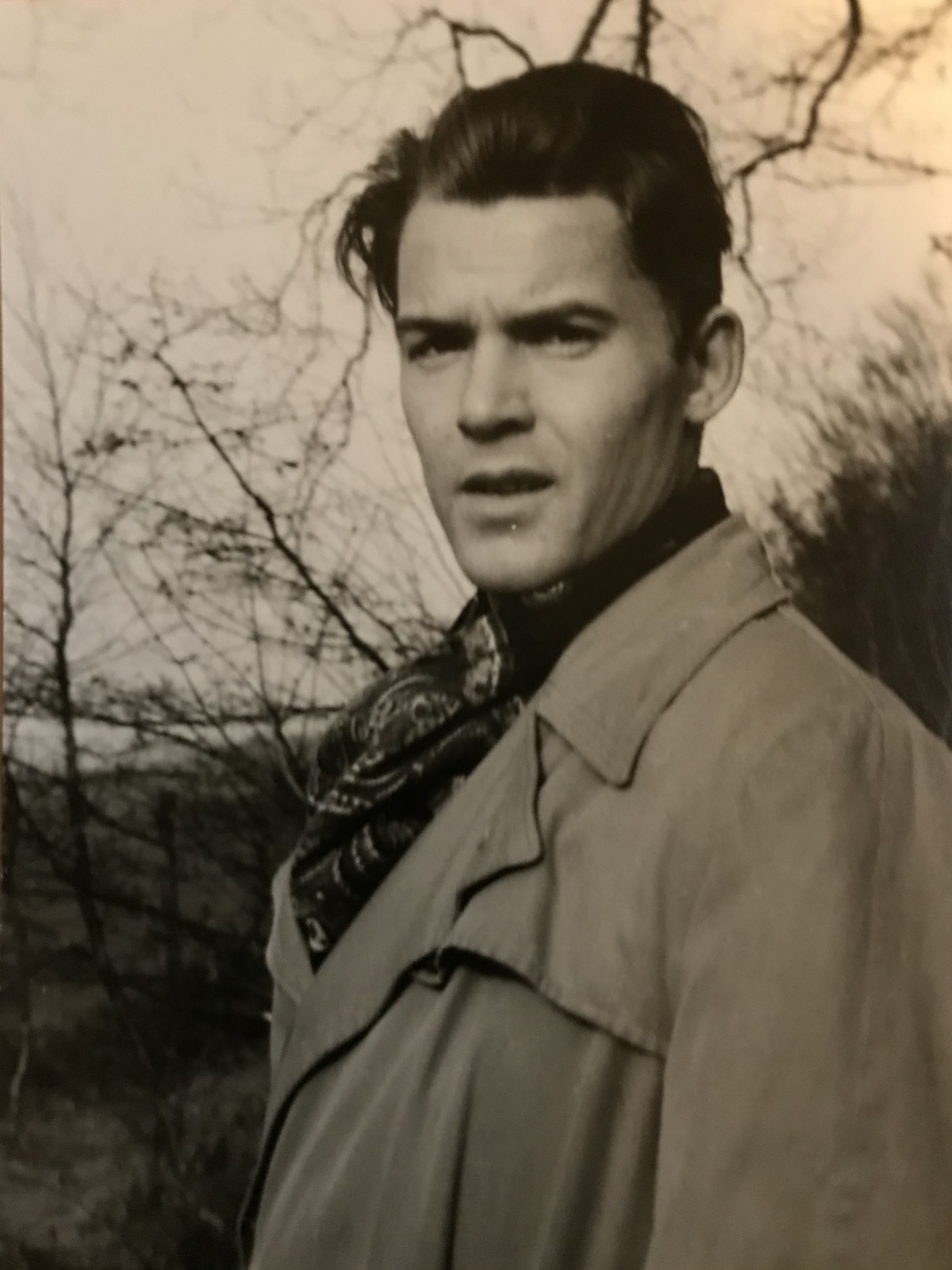
- Born: Hans-Eberhard Bosse; 16 October 1938; Wunstorf, Germany
- Died: 27 May 2023 (aged 84); Heidelberg, Germany
- Citizenship: German
- Education: University of Heidelberg; Free University of Berlin
- Scientific career
- Fields: Anthropology, Sociology, Social Psychology
- Workplaces: Goethe University Frankfurt

Hans Bosse (16 October 1938 – 27 May 2023) was a German anthropologist, sociologist, and social psychologist. He is best known for his sociological and ethnological research on traditional societies of Papua New Guinea.

Bosse made various contributions to sociology, including on ethnopsychoanalysis, the socialization of violence, criticism of cultural imperialism, and reciprocity in different cultures.

== Early life and education ==
Hans Bosse was born in Wunstorf, near Hanover, on 16 October 1938.

From 1959 to 1965, he studied theology and philosophy at Wuppertal and Berlin, as well as at the University of Göttingen, University of Tübingen, and University of Heidelberg.

Bosse graduated from the University of Heidelberg in 1968 with a doctorate in theology, and received a doctorate in sociology from the Free University of Berlin in 1975. He obtained his Habilitation in sociology at the Free University of Berlin.

== Career ==
From 1976, Bosse was Professor of Social Psychology and Sociology at Johann Wolfgang Goethe University in Frankfurt am Main, and was also a research group director at the Institute for Group Analysis (German: Institut für Gruppenanalyse) in Heidelberg.

== Research ==
From 1978 to 1985, Bosse performed sociological fieldwork at schools in Northwest Province, Cameroon. During that period, he also did research in London, Heidelberg, and Melbourne as a visiting fellow.

From 1984, Bosse performed sociological research in Papua New Guinea for many decades, including an in-depth study on "becoming a Papua New Guinean" at Passam National High School in Paliama, which is now part of Wewak Rural LLG, East Sepik Province, Papua New Guinea. Georg R. Gfäller also performed research with Bosse in Cameroon and Papua New Guinea.

Bosse also carried out research on the concept of group analysis (German: Gruppenanalyse).

Bosse made various contributions to sociology, including intercultural comparison on the socialization of violence in Africa and Papua New Guinea, and male willingness to use violence and its socialization in different cultures (see Freud's concept of sublimation); introduction of group analytical research into sociology; extension of ethnopsychoanalysis (see Paul Parin, known as the co-founder of ethnopsychoanalysis) to the study of ethnoanalysis; the connection between theology and sociology; criticism of cultural imperialism; and the reciprocity hypothesis, which states that societies are not only based on the exchange of goods or money, but also on prestige, reputation, art, objects of value, and so forth.

== Personal life and death ==
Bosse married Jennifer Rachel Bearlin in 1966 in Melbourne, Australia. Their first daughter, Alexia Renee, was born in Hanover, Germany in 1968, and their second daughter, Francisca Bronwyn, was born in 1970 in the same city.

Hans Bosse died in Heidelberg, Germany on 27 May 2023, at the age of 84.

== Affiliations ==
- German Society for Sociology (Deutsche Gesellschaft für Soziologie)
- Association of German Scientists (Vereinigung Deutscher Wissenschaftler)
- German Working Group for Group Psychotherapy and Group Dynamics (Deutscher Arbeitskreis für Gruppenpsychotherapie und Gruppendynamik, or DAGG)

== Selected publications ==
Some of Bosse's publications include:

- Bosse, Hans; Hamburger, Franz (1973). Friedenspädagogik und Dritte Welt. Voraussetzungen einer Didaktik des Konflikts. Kohlhammer: Stuttgart, Berlin, Köln, Mainz.
- Bosse, Hans (1979). Diebe, Lügner, Faulenzer. Von Abhängigkeit und Verweigerung in der dritten Welt. Frankfurt/Main: Syndikat.
- Bosse, Hans (1994). Becoming a Papua New Guinean: A Report of a Sociologist's and Group Analyst's Research with Students At Passam National High School (NRI Discussion Paper, 78). National Research Institute. ISBN 978-9980750655.
- Bosse, Hans (1997). "Kontinuität und Wandel in Männlichkeitskonstruktionen: Ein Modell biographischer Sinnbildung mit Fallmaterial aus Papua-Neuguinea". In K.-S. Rehberg (Hrsg.), Differenz und Integration: die Zukunft moderner Gesellschaften; Verhandlungen des 28. Kongresses der Deutschen Gesellschaft für Soziologie im Oktober 1996 in Dresden; Band 2: Sektionen, Arbeitsgruppen, Foren, Fedor-Stepun-Tagung (S. 79–83). Opladen: Westdt. Verl. https://nbn-resolving.org/urn:nbn:de:0168-ssoar-139467
- Bosse, Hans (2000). Männlichkeitsentwürfe: Wandlungen und Widerstände im Geschlechterverhältnis. Campus Verlag, 2000. ISBN 9783593365862
- Bosse, Hans; Vera King (2000) (eds.). Männlichkeitsentwürfe. Wandlungen und Widerstände im Geschlechterverhältnis. Frankfurt am Main: Campus.
- Bosse, Hans (2010). Der fremde Mann: Angst und Verlangen: gruppenanalytische Untersuchungen in Papua-Neuguinea: Psyche und Gesellschaft. Psychosozial-Verlag. ISBN 9783898066709.
- Bosse, Hans (1993). A Group's Bad Self in Papua New Guinea: A True Home in the Modern World? September 1, 1993 Research Article doi:10.1177/0533316493263012

== See also ==
- Vera King
- Paul Parin
- Georg R. Gfäller
