= Heike Fleßner =

German educationalist (1944–2021)

- Born: 14 April 1944; Esens, East Frisia, Hanover, Prussia, Germany
- Died: 2 February 2021 (aged 76); Germany
- Occupations: Educationalist; Professor

Heike Fleßner (14 April 1944 – 2 February 2021) was a German educationalist and professor, whose work focused on social education and social work. She was a Professor of Social Pedagogy at the Carl von Ossietzky University of Oldenburg from 1996 until her retirement in 2009. Her scientific work focuses on analytics and conceptual developments in the field of gender- and diversity-conscious social education. For many years, Fleßner was involved in social policy and the institutional anchoring of public toddler care and early childhood education (crèche and kindergarten).

== Career ==
Fleßner was born in Esens, East Frisia, Hanover, Prussia. From 1966 to 1971, she was a secondary school teacher. She later became a scientific assistant and then a director of studies at the University of Oldenburg. In 1980, she earned her doctorate from the university, focusing her research on the development of public preschool education in rural Germany from 1870 to 1924. Her habilitation in 1994 – she received a venia legendi for educational science with a focus on social education, also at the University of Oldenburg – dealt with the topic "Motherhood as a profession: historical findings or current structural feature of social work?" In 1996, Fleßner was appointed by the university as a lecturer and Professor of Social Pedagogy. The following year, in 1997/98, she was a visiting professor of women's studies at Towson University in Maryland in the United States.

Fleßner was a co-founder of Gender studies at the University of Oldenburg, which began offering a Master's degree in Gender Studies in the 1997/98 school year and BA in Gender Studies beginning in 2007/08, and of the university's Center of Interdisciplinary Research on Women and Gender (ZFG) which opened in December 2000, and which she directed until her retirement in 2009.

Heike Fleßner died on 2 February 2021, at the age of 76.

== Memberships ==
From 1985 to 1991, Fleßner was a member of the City Council of Oldenburg focusing on urban development planning and youth welfare policy, specifically public early childhood education (crèche and kindergarten). Since 2013, she has served as the regional chairman of the Landesverband Niedersachsen pro familia, the German Association for Family Planning, Sexual Education and Sexual Counseling, beginning as deputy state chairman in 2009.

She is a board member of the Bertha Ramsauer Foundation in Oldenburg, and a member of the Scientific Advisory Board of the Center for Women and Gender Studies (ZIF); the center is jointly supported by the University of Hildesheim and HAWK Hildesheim / Holzminden / Göttingen.

== Publications (selection) ==
=== Books ===
- Familiengerechte Hochschule. Daten – Herausforderungen – Perspektiven (gemeinsam mit Karin Flaake, Angelika Müller, Juliane Pegel). Oldenburg: BIS-Verlag 2008.
- Mütterlichkeit als Beruf: historischer Befund oder aktuelles Strukturmerkmal sozialer Arbeit. Oldenburg: BIS-Verlag 1995.
- Untertanenzucht oder Menschenerziehung? Zur Entwicklung öffentlicher Kleinkinderziehung auf dem Lande (1870–1924). Weinheim und Basel: Beltz 1981.

=== Significant editorial work ===
- Jungenarbeit. Dialog zwischen Praxis und Wissenschaft (gemeinsam mit Michael Herschelmann und Detlev Pech). Oldenburg: BIS-Verlag 2005.
- Societies in Transition – Challenges to Women's and Gender Studies (gemeinsam mit Lydia Potts). Opladen: Leske und Budrich 2002. With an introduction by Heike Fleßner and Lydia Potts.

=== Significant articles (textbooks and manuals) ===
- Geschlechterbewusste Pädagogik im Kontext diversitätsbewusster Pädagogik. In: Leiprecht, R./ Steinbach, A. (Hrsg.): Schule in der Migrationsgesellschaft. Ein Handbuch. Bd. 1: Grundlagen – Diversität – Fachdidaktiken. Debus Pädagogik: Schwalbach/Ts. 2015, pp 305–323.
- Geschlechterbewusste Soziale Arbeit. In: Enzyklopädie Erziehungswissenschaft Online (EEO), Fachgebiet Soziale Arbeit/Soziale Arbeit als Profession, hrsg. von W. Schröer und C. Schweppe, Weinheim und Basel: Beltz Juventa 2013, (www.erzwissonline.de: DOI 10.3262/EEO14130279)
- Adoleszente Elternschaft (Lexikonartikel). In: Ehlert, G./Funk, H./Stecklina, G. (Hrsg.): Wörterbuch: Soziale Arbeit und Geschlecht. Juventa: Weinheim 2011, pp 18–20.
- Geschlecht und Interkulturalität – Überlegungen zur Weiterentwicklung einer geschlechterbewussten interkulturellen Pädagogik. In: Leiprecht, R./ Kerber, A.: (Hrsg.): Schule in der Einwanderungsgesellschaft. Ein Handbuch. Wochenschau-Verlag: Schwalbach/Ts. 2005, pp 162–179.
- Women's Studies (Lexikonartikel). In: Kroll, R. (Hrsg.): Lexikon GenderStudies. Stuttgart/ Weimar: Metzler 2002, pp 408–410.

=== Significant contributions (anthologies) ===
- Arbeit und Fürsorglichkeit. Alltägliche Geschlechterverhältnisse und ihre Bedeutung für die Soziale Arbeit. In: Sabla, Kim-Patrick/Plößer, Melanie (Hrsg.): Gendertheorien und Theorien Sozialer Arbeit. Bezüge, Lücken und Herausforderungen. Opladen, Berlin und Toronto: Budrich 2013, pp 79–98.
- Frühe Chancen nutzen! – Die Krippe als präventive Einrichtung. In: Ricking, H./ Schulze, G.C. (Hrsg.): Förderbedarf in der sozialen und emotionalen Entwicklung. Prävention, Interdisziplinarität und Professionalisierung. Bad Heilbrunn: Klinckhardt 2010, pp 198–209.
- Helene Lange – Die Zukunft ist uns noch alles schuldig. In: Anne Kosfeld (Hrsg.): Von der Gelehrtenstube in den Hörsaal. Oldenburger Wissenschaftlerinnen im Wandel der Zeit. Bremen: Hauschild 2009, pp 70–89.
- Frühe Schwangerschaften. (2008) In: Scheithauer, H./Hayer, T./Niebank, K. (Hrsg.): Problemverhalten und Gewalt im Jugendalter. Erscheinungsformen, Entstehungsbedingungen und Möglichkeiten der Prävention. Stuttgart: Kohlhammer 2008, pp 225–238.
- Support for Young Pregnant Women and Juvenile Mothers in Germany. Historical Changes in Concepts and Practices. In: Scheiwe, K./ Willekens, H. (Eds.): Between Autonomy and Dependency: Reproductive Rights, Pregnancy and Motherhood of Teenagers and Young Women – Legal and Social Perspectives. International Journal of Law, Policy and the Family 18. Oxford: Oxford University Press 2004, pp 372–385.

=== Significant contributions (journals) ===
- Sozialraumorientierung in der Sozialen Arbeit: geschichtliche Wurzeln – Entwicklungslinien – aktuelle Herausforderungen. In: Evangelische Jugendhilfe 2011, H. 1, pp 4–13.
- Oldenburger Genderforschung. In: Oldenburger Genderforschung (Themenheft). Einblicke. Forschungsmagazin der Universität Oldenburg, Nr. 43, 2006, pp 3–5.
- Jugend, Geschlecht und pädagogische Prozesse (gemeinsam mit Karin Flaake). In: deutsche jugend, H. 9, 2004, pp 381–388.
- Minderjährige Schwangere in der Beratung – Was soziologische und entwicklungspsychologische Erkenntnisse für die Beratungspraxis bedeuten. In: Niedersächsisches Ministerium für Soziales, Frauen, Familie und Gesundheit (Hrsg.): Herausforderungen in der Beratung Schwangerer. Hannover 2007, pp 43–59.
