= Karl Landauer =

German psychoanalyst

Karl Landauer (German: [ˈlandaʊɐ]; 12 October 1887 – 27 January 1945) was a German psychoanalyst and co-founder of the first Frankfurt Psychoanalytic Institute. He died of starvation in the Bergen-Belsen concentration camp, Germany.

== Early life ==
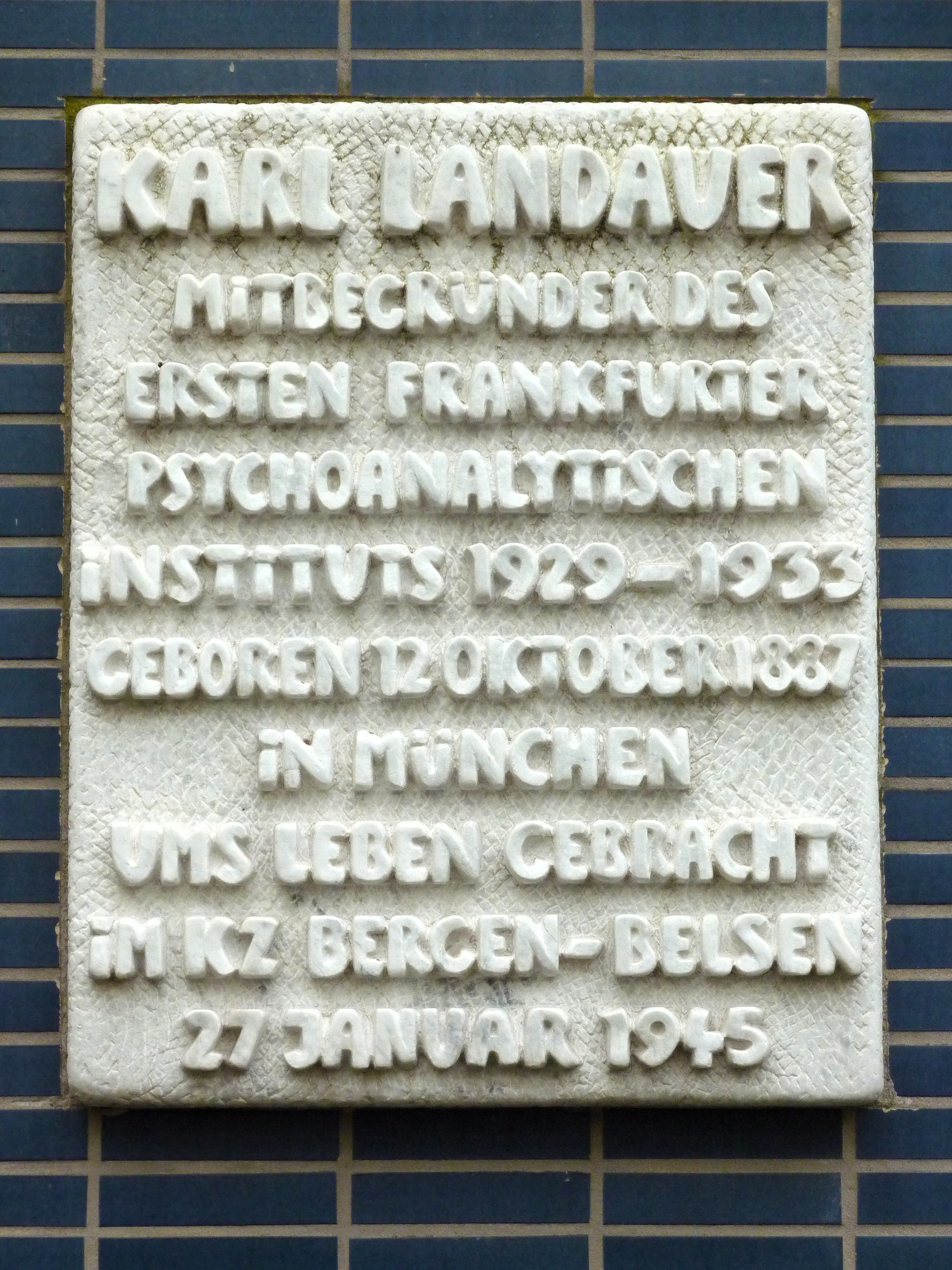
Memorial plaque for Karl Landauer on the façade of the Sigmund Freud Institute

Landauer was born in 1887 into a Jewish banking family in Munich. At the age of 13 his father died. As the only son he took over the religious duties as the head of the family. After graduating from the Wilhelmsgymnasium Munich in 1906, he completed a medical degree (in Freiburg and in Berlin) and undertook training as a specialist in neuropathy at the LMU Klinikum led by Emil Kraepelin. In 1912 he went to Vienna to complete analytic training with Freud and to practice at the psychiatric clinic of Wagner-Jauregg. He dealt mainly with psychosis and the issues of narcissism and made significant contributions to the psychoanalysis of affect formation.

== Career ==
After the First World War, Landauer became a pacifist. In 1916, he fell ill with typhus and was subsequently transferred to a military prison in Heilbronn as a doctor. There he met and married Lins Kahn.

After the war, he settled and ran a private practice in Frankfurt am Main c.1923. He became friends with Max Horkheimer. The Frankfurt Psychoanalytical Institute (now the Sigmund Freud Institute), co-founded by Landauer, cooperated with Horkheimer's Institute for Social Research, in whose rooms he had guest status. In 1933 both facilities were closed. Landauer could have fled to Sweden, but instead settled in the Netherlands, where he worked as a training analyst.

== Nazi persecution and death ==
After the Netherlands came under Nazi occupation, he received a professional ban in 1942 and was arrested in 1943. In February 1944 he was deported to the Bergen-Belsen concentration camp together with his wife and eldest daughter, where he died of starvation in January 1945. Both his wife and daughter, Eva Landauer, survived the concentration camp. Two of Landauer's younger children were able to avoid arrest.

== Legacy ==
On the occasion of the 100th anniversary of Goethe University, a Stolperstein, (a 'stumbling stone monument'), was laid to commemorate him on 17 October 2014 at Savignystraße 76.

== Publications ==
- Spontanheilung einer Katatonie. Zeitschrift für ärztliche Psychoanalyse 2 (1914), 441–459
- Passive Technik: Zur Analyse narzißtischer Erkrankungen. Internationale Zeitschrift für Psychoanalyse 10 (1924), 415–422
- Die Affekte und ihre Entwicklung. Imago 22 (1936), 275–291
- Theorie der Affekte und andere Schriften zur Ich-Organisation. Hg. von HJ Rothe. Frankfurt/Main (Fischer) 1991
