= Vera King =

German sociologist and social psychologist

Vera King is a German sociologist and social psychologist. She has been Professor of Sociology and Social Psychology at Goethe University Frankfurt and Director of the Sigmund Freud Institute in Frankfurt am Main since 2016.

== Career ==
After studies in sociology, psychology and educational science, King obtained her doctorate in 1994 at the University of Frankfurt am Main, writing on the significance of Freud's case study, "Fragment of an Analysis of a Case of Hysteria" for the theoretical development of psychoanalysis. In 2002, she completed her habilitation writing on The Emergence of the New in Adolescence. Individuation, Generativity and Gender in Modernized Societies, earning the venia legendi for sociology. That same year, she accepted a position at the University of Hamburg as a professor in the Department of Education, specializing in socialization and development research. In March 2016, she accepted a joint professorship for sociology and psychoanalytical social psychology at the Goethe University in Frankfurt together with the position of managing director of the Sigmund Freud Institute, which she assumed in November 2016

== Research ==
King's research and publications focus on the analysis of relationships between social conditions and individual development, between culture and the psyche. She has carried out and published on projects in the fields of youth and adolescence research, family and generation research and social-psychological cultural analyses, among others. The book Female Adolescence, published in 1992 with Karin Flaake, combined social and cultural scientific analyses with developmental psychological and psychoanalytical perspectives. In later works, she examined the significance of youth/adolescence and the “adolescent space of possibility” for biographical and cultural development. In particular, she investigated the intergenerational dynamics of adolescence and developed a concept of generativity at the intersection of subject and cultural theory. Her research on intergenerational relationships extends to studies on families and the psychosocial development of parents, children and adolescents in the context of migration and flight.

King also conducts research on the psychosocial and psychological consequences of the dynamics of optimization, altered relationships of time and digitalization, and against this background on the social psychology of authoritarianism and populism, too. She is spokeswoman for the interdisciplinary research projects Aporias of Perfection in Accelerated Modernity and Measured Life. Productive and Counterproductive Consequences of Digitally Quantifying Optimization. She heads these projects together with Benigna Gerisch and Hartmut Rosa (funded by the Volkswagen Foundation under the funding line Key Topics for Science and Society). She also engages in research on art and psychoanalysis.

== Functions ==
Vera King is co-editor of the journals Psyche and Psychosozial. She is a member of the Foundation and advisory board of the International Psychoanalytic University Berlin, a member of the scientific advisory board of the Medical Academy for Child and Adolescent Psychotherapy e. V. and the Freiburg Institute for Advanced Studies as well as a member of the Comité scientifique international of the Association Internationale Interactions de la Psychanalyse. Furthermore, she is a scientific advisor to various scientific journals, including the journal Diskurs Kindheits- und Jugendforschung, the journal Familiendynamik and the journal Kinder- und Jugendlichen-Psychotherapie (KJP).

== Selected publications ==
- 2025: Vera King, Benigna Gerisch, Hartmut Rosa (Eds.): The Measured Life in the Digital Age. Optimisation by Numbers. London, New York: Routledge.
- 2025: Vera King, Heinz Weiß (Eds.): Hoffnung in der Krise? Doppelheft PSYCHE. Zeitschrift für Psychoanalyse und ihre Anwendungen, 79(9/10), Stuttgart: Klett-Cotta. DOI: 10.21706/ps-79-9
- 2023: Susanne Benzel, Vera King, Hans-Christoph Koller, Patrick Meurs & Heinz Weiß (Hrsg.): Adoleszenz und Generationendynamik im Kontext von Migration und Flucht. Wiesbaden: Springer VS.
- 2022: Vera King: Sozioanalyse. Zur Psychoanalyse des Sozialen mit Pierre Bourdieu. Gießen: Psychosozial Verlag.
- 2021: Vera King, Benigna Gerisch, Hartmut Rosa (eds.): Lost in Perfection. Zur Optimierung von Gesellschaft und Psyche. Berlin: Suhrkamp
- 2021: Vera King, Ferdinand Sutterlüty (eds.): Schwerpunkt: Destruktivität und Regression im Rechtspopulismus. WestEnd. Zeitschrift für Sozialforschung 1/2021
- 2019: Vera King, Benigna Gerisch, Hartmut Rosa (eds.). Lost in Perfection, Impacts of Optimisation on Culture and Psyche. Routledge, 1st Edition
- 2015: Vera King, Benigna Gerisch (Hrsg.): Perfektionierung und Destruktivität. Schwerpunktheft der Zeitschrift Psychosozial. 2015, H. 3.
- 2013: Vera King, Burkhard Müller (eds.): Lebensgeschichten junger Frauen und Männer mit Migrationshintergrund in Deutschland und Frankreich. Interkulturelle Analysen eines deutsch-französischen Jugendforschungsprojekts. (= Schriftenreihe des Deutsch-Französischen Jugendwerks Dialoge – Dialogues. Bd. 3). Münster: Waxmann.
- 2012: Peter Bründl, Vera King: Herausgeber des Jahrbuchs für Kinder- und Jugendlichen-Psychologie, Bd. 1: Adoleszenz – gelingende und misslingende Transformationen. Frankfurt am Main: Brandes & Apsel.
- 2012: Herausgeberin des Schwerpunktes: Veränderte Zeiten in Kindheit und Jugend. Diskurs Kindheits- und Jugendforschung. Jg. 7, H. 1.
- 2009: Vera King, Benigna Gerisch (eds.): Zeitgewinn und Selbstverlust. Folgen und Grenzen der Beschleunigung in der späten Moderne. Frankfurt am Main: Campus.
- 2006: Vera King, Hans-Christoph Koller (eds.): Adoleszenz – Migration – Bildung. Bildungsprozesse Jugendlicher und junger Erwachsener mit Migrationshintergrund. Wiesbaden: VS. Zweite erweiterte Auflage 2009.
- 2005: Vera King, Karin Flaake (eds.): Männliche Adoleszenz. Sozialisation und Bildungsprozesse zwischen Kindheit und Erwachsensein. Frankfurt am Main: Campus.
- 2002: Die Entstehung des Neuen in der Adoleszenz. Individuation, Generativität und Geschlecht in modernisierten Gesellschaften. Opladen: Leske und Budrich (Habilitationsschrift). 2. Auflage Wiesbaden: Springer, 2013.
- 2000: Vera King, Burkhard Müller (eds.): Adoleszenz und pädagogische Praxis. Bedeutungen von Geschlecht, Generation und Herkunft in der Jugendarbeit. Freiburg: Lambertus.
- 2000: Hans Bosse, Vera King (eds.): Männlichkeitsentwürfe. Wandlungen und Widerstände im Geschlechterverhältnis. Frankfurt am Main: Campus.
- 1995: Vera King: Die Urszene der Psychoanalyse. Adoleszenz und Geschlechterspannung im Fall Dora. Stuttgart: VIP/Klett-Cotta (Dissertation).
- 1992: Karin Flaake, Vera King: Weibliche Adoleszenz. Zur Sozialisation junger Frauen. Frankfurt am Main: Campus. 4. Auflage 1998.
