= Georg R. Gfäller =

German psychologist

- Born: 1949 (age 76–77); Germany
- Citizenship: German
- Education: European University Viadrina
- Scientific career
- Fields: Psychoanalysis, psychotherapy, and group analysis
- Website: www.gfaeller.com

Georg R. Gfäller (born 1949 in Germany) is a German psychologist and psychoanalyst. He is known for his work in psychoanalysis, psychotherapy, and group analysis. Gfäller is also notable for his ethnoanalytical research performed with Carl Friedrich von Weizsäcker and Hans Bosse.

== Education and career ==
Gfäller attended LMU Munich for his undergraduate studies. He graduated from European University Viadrina in Frankfurt an der Oder with a Doctor of Philosophy degree. There, he wrote his dissertation on psychoanalysis and group analysis.

From 1971 to 1976, he was a Research Associate with C. F. von Weizsäcker of the Max Planck Institute, and also performed ethnoanalytical research in Lapland and East Tyrol. During the 1980s, he performed ethno-group analysis research among peoples of Cameroon and Papua New Guinea under Dr. Hans Bosse at the University of Frankfurt am Main (now Goethe University Frankfurt). He then went onto become the Founding Chairman of the Professional Association of Bavarian Psychoanalysts (German: Berufsverbandes bayerischer Psychoanalytiker und Psychoanalytikerinnen).

Together with Günter Jerouschek and Barbara Tybusseck, he founded the Institute for Mediation (Instituts für Mediation), where he is now the Scientific Director.

Gfäller sits on the scientific advisory boards of various organizations and universities, including European University Viadrina in Frankfurt (Oder).

He currently works in Kiefersfelden, Bavaria, Germany.

== Affiliations ==
Gfäller is a member of the advisory boards of:

- "Munich Mediation Center", Association of Mediation Societies and Training Centers ("Mediationszentrale München", Verbund von Mediationsgesellschaften und -ausbildungsstätten)
- Field of Cultural Studies, Health Sciences (Bereich Kulturwissenschaften, Gesundheitswissenschaften) at European University Viadrina in Frankfurt (Oder)

== Selected publications ==
Gfäller has over 50 publications, which include topics on psychoanalysis, group analysis, and other topics.

Some of his books include:

- Die Wirkung des Verborgenen (2010) (ISBN 978-3-608-89098-3)
- Gruppenanalyse, Gruppendynamik, Psychodrama (ISBN 978-3-930978-61-8)
- Die Wirkung des Verborgenen (2013) (ISBN 978-3-608-10547-6)

Selected articles include:

- Gfäller, Georg R. "Können unbewusste Hintergründe in der Mediation genutzt werden?" Zeitschrift für Konfliktmanagement, vol. 15, no. 1, 2012, pp. 7–12. doi:10.9785/ovs-zkm-2012-7
