= Karin Flaake =

German sociologist and professor

- Born: 1944 (age 80–81); Schwerin, Mecklenburg, Germany
- Occupation(s): Sociologist and professor

Karin Flaake (born 1944 in Schwerin, in Mecklenburg, Germany) is a German sociologist and professor (retired) at the Carl von Ossietzky University Oldenburg. Her publications on the adolescence of young women and men (some written jointly with Vera King) are part of the literature of socio-psychologically oriented gender research. Another focus of her work is on the chances of changing gender relations in families.

== Biography ==
Karin Flaake studied sociology and psychoanalytic social psychology in Frankfurt / Main, then from 1972 to 1975 was a research associate at the sociological seminar of the University of Göttingen, working on a research project on political learning processes in general education schools. From 1975 to 1989 she was a research associate at the Institut für Sozialforschung in Frankfurt / Main, working on research projects in education and sociology. Afterwards, she took her habilitation on the topic: "Gender-specific patterns of identity and vocational orientations of teachers". From 1982 to 1986, she had training at the Institute for Group Analysis Heidelbergan worked with the Frankfurt Working Group for Psychoanalytical Education (FAPP). From 1991 to 1994 she was a professor at the Psychological Institute of Freie Universität Berlin, working in the field of feminist science. From 1994 to the end of 2007 she was Professor of Sociology with a focus on women's and gender studies at the Carl von Ossietzky University Oldenburg. Flaake is - especially with Heike Fleßner - the co-founder of the Study Program Women's and Gender Studies and the Center for Interdisciplinary Women's and Gender Studies.

Her work focuses on the following topics: sociological and psychoanalytical-socio-psychological gender research, in particular: analyzes of socialization and gender, social psychology of gender relations, gender relations in the educational sector, gender relations in families, and empirical investigations with psychoanalytical-hermeneutic methods of text interpretation.

=== Memberships ===
- Scientific advisory board of the Frankfurt Center for Eating Disorders.
- Scientific advisory board of the journal gruppenanalyse of the Heidelberger Institut für Gruppenanalyse.

== Publications (selection) ==
=== Books ===
- Die Jugendlichen und ihr Verhältnis zum Körper, Stuttgart 2019 (Kohlhammer Verlag)
- Neue Mütter – neue Väter. Eine empirische Studie zu veränderten Geschlechterbeziehungen in Familien, Giessen 2014 (Psychosozial-Verlag)
- With Heike Fleßner, Angelika I. Müller, Juliane Pegel (eds..): Familiengerechte Hochschule. Daten – Herausforderungen – Perspektiven.Oldenburg 2008 ( BIS-Verlag)
- With Kristina Hackmann, Irene Pieper-Seier, Stephanie Radtke: Professorinnen in der Mathematik - Berufliche Werdegänge und Verortungen in der Disziplin. Bielefeld 2006 (Kleine Verlag)
- With Almut Kirschbaum, Dorothee Noeres und Heike Fleßner: Promotionsförderung und Geschlecht. Zur Bedeutung geschlechtsspezifisch wirkender Auswahlprozesse bei der Förderung von Promotionen an niedersächsischen Hochschulen. Oldenburg 2005 (BIS Verlag)
- With Vera King, ed.: Männliche Adoleszenz. Sozialisation und Bildungsprozesse zwischen Kindheit und Erwachsensein. Frankfurt a.M./New York 2005 (Campus)
- Körper, Sexualität und Geschlecht. Studien zur Adoleszenz junger Frauen, Gießen 2001 (Psychosozial-Verlag)
- With Vera King ed.: Weibliche Adoleszenz. Zur Sozialisation junger Frauen, Frankfurt a.M./New York 1992 (Campus) (Neuauflage als Taschenbuch Weinheim 2003, Beltz)
- Berufliche Orientierungen von Lehrerinnen und Lehrern. Eine empirische Untersuchung, Frankfurt a.M./New York 1989 (Campus)

=== Articles in magazines and edited volumes ===
- Transgender Jugendliche – das Leiden am Körper, die Bedeutung einer empathischen Begleitung und die produktiven Potenziale gruppenanalytisch orientierter Angebote, gruppenanalyse, 2/2023, S. 61–78
- Transgender – Jugendliche – das Leiden am Körper und die Bedeutung einer empathischen Begleitung, Deutsche Jugend, Heft 11, 2022 und Heft 1, 2023
- Paardynamiken, in: Haller, Lisa Y./Schlender, Alicia (Hrsg.): Handbuch Feministische Perspektiven auf Elternschaft, Opladen, Berlin, Toronto 2022 (Barbara Budrich), S. 389–400.
- Körper. Beziehungsdynamiken und soziale Einbindungen, in: Günther, Marga/ Heilmann, Joachim/ Kerschgens, Anke (Hrsg.): Psychoanalytische Pädagogik und Soziale Arbeit. Verstehensorientierte Beziehungsarbeit als Voraussetzung für professionelles Handeln, Gießen 2022 (psychosozial), S. 293 - 310.
- Sexualität. Entwicklungspsychologische Perspektiven, in: Günther, Marga/ Heilmann, Joachim/ Kerschgens, Anke (Hrsg.): Psychoanalytische Pädagogik und Soziale Arbeit. Verstehensorientierte Beziehungsarbeit als Voraussetzung für professionelles Handeln, Gießen 2022 (psychosozial), S. 277 - 292.
- Paardynamiken. Geschlechterbeziehungen zwischen Traditionalisierung und Neugestaltung, In: Haller, Lisa Y./Schlender, Alicia (Hrsg.): Handbuch Feministische Perspektiven auf Elternschaft, Opladen, Berlin, Toronto 2022 (Barbara Budrich), S. 389 - 400.
- Geteilte Elternschaft. Geschlechterbeziehungen zwischen Traditionalisierung und Neugestaltung, In: Krüger-Kirn, Helga/Tichy, Leila Zoe (Hrsg.): Elternschaft und Gender Trouble. Geschlechterkritische Perspektiven auf den Wandel der Familie, Opladen, Berlin, Toronto 2021 (Barbara Budrich), p. 145 – 160.
- “Du pinkelst ja im Sitzen!” – Gesellschaftliche Zuschreibungen an den Körper und Körpererleben in der Adoleszenz junger Männer, In: Katharina Busch u. a. (Hrsg.): Figurationen spätmoderner Lebensführung, Wiesbaden 2020 (Springer VS), p. 45 – 64.
- Körpergestaltungen, Körperpräsentationen und Körperinszenierungen junger Frauen und Männer – Suche nach eigenen Ausdrucksmöglichkeiten in der Adoleszenz In: deutsche jugend 12, 2020, S. 513 – 522.
- Dynamiken in Familien mit einer in der Paarbeziehung geteilten Elternschaft – Traditionalisierungstendenzen und Potenziale für eine Neugestaltung von Geschlechterbildern und Geschlechterbeziehungen. Ergebnisse einer qualitativ empirischen Untersuchung, In: psychosozial 1/2018
- Junge Frauen, Adoleszenz und homoerotisches Begehren. Begrenzungen trotz erweiterter Handlungsmöglichkeiten, In: Annelinde Eggert-Schmid Noerr u. a. (Hrsg.): Unheimlich und verlockend. Zum pädagogischen Umgang mit Sexualität von Kindern und Jugendlichen. Gießen 2017 (Psychosozial – Verlag), p. 137–149
- Egalitäre Geschlechterverhältnisse in Familien und mütterliche Erwerbstätigkeit – Potenziale einer in der Paarbeziehung geteilten Elternschaft. Erfahrungen von Müttern, Vätern, Töchtern und Söhnen, In: Annette von Alemann/Sandra Beaufays/Beate Kortendiek (Hrsg.): Alte und neue Ungleichheiten. Auflösungen und Neukonfigurationen von Erwerbs- und Familiensphäre, Gender Sonderheft 4, 2016, p. 108–123
- Neue Konstellationen für Männlichkeitsentwürfe – Potentiale einer in der Paarbeziehung geteilten Elternschaft für Entwicklungsmöglichkeiten von Jungen und jungen Männern, In: Bettina Dausien/Christine Thon/Katharina Walgenbach (Hrsg.): Geschlecht – Sozialisation – Transformationen. Jahrbuch Frauen- und Geschlechterforschung in der Erziehungswissenschaft, Band 11, Opladen/Berlin/Toronto 2015 (Barbara Budrich), p. 147–162
- Bedeutung traditioneller Mutterbilder in Familien mit einer in der Paarbeziehung geteilten Elternschaft. Beharrungstendenzen und Veränderungsprozesse, In: Helga Krüger-Kirn/Marita Metz-Becker/Ingrid Rieken (Hrsg.): Mutterbilder. Kulturhistorische, sozialpolitische und psychoanalytische Perspektiven. Gießen 2016 (Psychosozial Verlag), p. 165–180
- Neue Konstellationen für Identitäten für Frauen – Potentiale einer in der Paarbeziehung geteilten Elternschaft, In: Analytische Kinder- und Jugendlichenpsychotherapie, Heft 165, XLVI. Jg., 1/2015, p. 7–28
- Pubertät, Biologie und Kultur: Erfahrungen körperlicher Veränderungen. In: Katharina Liebsch (Hrsg.): Jugendsoziologie. Über Adoleszente, Teenager und neue Generationen, München 2012 (Oldenbourg Verlag), p. 135–152
- Gender, Care und veränderte Arbeitsteilungen in Familien – geteilte Elternschaft und Wandlungen in familialen Geschlechterverhältnissen, In: Gender 3/2011, S. 73–88
- Männliche Adoleszenz und Sucht. In: Jutta Jacob/Heino Stöver (Hrsg.): Männer im Rausch. Konstruktionen und Krisen von Männlichkeiten im Kontext von Rausch und Sucht, Bielefeld 2009 (transkript), p. 23–32
- Frauen- und Geschlechterforschung als Prozess der Selbstveränderung – Berufliche Entwicklungen im Schnittpunkt von Soziologie, Psychoanalyse und Frauen- und Geschlechterforschung. In: Vogel, Ulrike (Hrsg.): Wege in die Soziologie und die Frauen- und Geschlechterforschung. Autobiographische Notizen der ersten Generation von Professorinnen an der Universität. Wiesbaden 2006 (VS Verlag für Sozialwissenschaften), p. 166–177
- Feminismus/Gender Studies. In: Lohmann, Hans-Martin, Pfeiffer, Joachim (Hrsg.): Freud. Handbuch. Leben – Werk – Wirkung. Stuttgart/Weimar 2006 (J.B.Metzler), p. 383–395
- Junge Männer, Adoleszenz und Familienbeziehungen. In: King, Vera/Flaake, Karin (Hrsg.): Männliche Adoleszenz. Sozialisations- und Bildungsprozesse zwischen Kindheit und Erwachsensein. Frankfurt a. M./New York 2005 (Campus), p. 99–120
- Gemeinsam mit Heike Fleßner: Jugend, Geschlecht und pädagogische Prozesse. In: Hafeneger, Benno (Hrsg.): Subjektdiagnosen. Subjekt, Modernisierung und Bildung. Schwalbach/Ts. 2005, p. 135–157
- Girls, Adolescence and the Impact of Bodily Changes. Family Dynamics and Social Definitions of the Female Body. In: European Journal of Women&#39's Studies 2005, Vol. 12(2), p. 201–212
- Körperlichkeit und Sexualität in der Adoleszenz junger Frauen: Dynamiken in der Vater-Tochter-Beziehung, In: Psyche 5, 2003
- Geschlecht, Macht und Gewalt. Verletzungsoffenheit als lebensgeschichtlich prägende Erfahrung von Mädchen und jungen Frauen. In: Dackweiler, Regina-Maria/Schäfer, Reinhild (Hrsg.): Gewaltverhältnisse. Feministische Perspektiven auf Geschlecht und Gewalt. Frankfurt a. M./New York 2002(Campus), p. 161–170

=== Encyclopedia chapters ===
- Sexualität, in: Gudrun Ehlert u.a. (eds.): Wörterbuch Soziale Arbeit und Geschlecht, Weinheim und München 2011 (Beltz), p. 368
- Psychoanalytische Ansätze, in: Enzyklopädie Erziehungswissenschaft Online (EEO), Geschlechterforschung, Gendertheoretische Grundlagen 2009, (Juventa)
- Handbuchartikel „Menstruation“, „Ödipales Szenario“, „Mütter (und Töchter)“, „Adoleszenz“, „Mädchenforschung“, „Psychoanalyse“. In: Kroll, Renateet al. . (ed.): Metzler-Lexikon Gender Studies - Geschlechterforschung. Stuttgart/Weimar 2002 (J.B. Metzler
