= Paul Parin =

Swiss psychoanalyst, author and ethnologist (1916–2009)

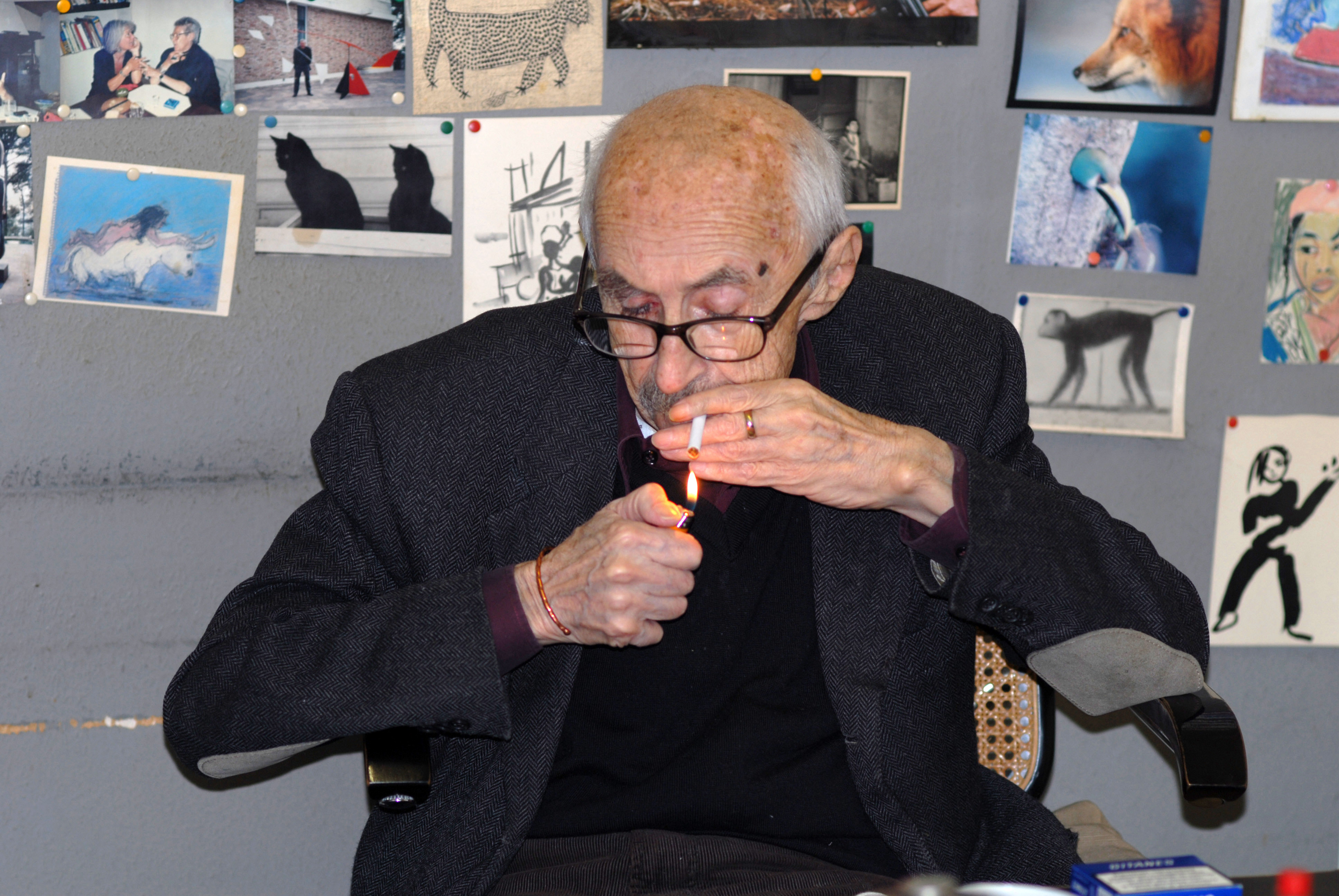
Paul Parin, 2006

Paul Parin (Swiss Standard German: [paˈriːn]; 20 September 1916 – 18 May 2009) was a Swiss psychoanalyst, author and ethnologist.

He was born in Polzela (German: Heilenstein), near Celje, Slovenia, then part of the Austro-Hungarian Empire, into a family of assimilated Jews. He studied medicine in Zagreb, Graz and Zürich. In Zürich, he met Goldy Matthèy-Guenet who became his wife. At the end of World War II, the two travelled to the liberated zone in south-east Yugoslavia, where they volunteered as physicians in the units of the partisan resistance. After the War, the two moved back to Zürich.

Parin, along with Fritz Morgenthaler and Goldy Parin-Matthèy, co-founded the Zurich School of Ethnopsychoanalysis in the 1950s. They conducted pioneering psychoanalytic research among the Agni and Dogon populations in West Africa during the 1960s, applying psychoanalytic methods in non-Western contexts. The Swiss ethnopsychoanalysis project collaborated closely with Georges Devereux (1908–1985), a prominent Hungarian-French anthropologist considered the founding figure of ethnopsychoanalysis in France. Additionally, contributions were made by researchers including Mario Erdheim, Maya Nadig, Florence Weiss, and Jochen Bonz.

In 1992, Parin received the prestigious Erich Fried Prize for his literary achievements.

Parin died in Zürich in 2009, aged 92.

== See also ==
- Hans Bosse, German sociologist who performed research on ethnopsychoanalysis
