= Passam National High School =

School in East Sepik Province, Papua New Guinea

Location
- Paliama, East Sepik Province; Papua New Guinea
- Coordinates: 3.6945°S 143.635°E

Information
- Religious affiliation: None
- Established: ??
- Gender: Coeducational 11th and 12th grades
- Enrolment: 600

Passam National High School is one of the six government-run national high schools in Papua New Guinea (PNG), which are also known as "schools of excellence". It is a coeducational school for Grades 11 and 12 and has a student population of around 600, consisting of both boarders and day-students. In 2020 and 2021 it was ranked as the top national high school in the country, based on exam results.

== History ==
The school is situated about 20 km (12.4 mi) south of the town of Wewak in the East Sepik Province of PNG. It was converted to being a national high school in the late 1960s and its boarders come from all over the country. The aim of having such national schools was to develop a concept of national unity in a culturally diverse society. In 1984 and 1985, students from the 1984 intake were the subject of a detailed research study by the Papua New Guinea National Research Institute, which aimed to investigate the impact of the school on how they became Papua New Guineans in a country with such diverse cultures, just a decade after independence. The research addressed questions of coeducation and inter-ethnic communication; and the need to balance the aim of schools to develop their students’ capacity to play professional roles in later life, against the need of students to bond with their own community.

In 2010 the school was forcefully blockaded by traditional landowners who were seeking compensation for the use of their land. It also suffered a serious arson attack. A combination of these events meant that it closed in June 2011 and did not re-open until 2014, initially with relatively few boarders as the male dormitories had yet to be rebuilt. However, the school slowly regained its fortunes and by 2020 it had become the best-performing national school, as measured by exam results. Almost all of the students go on to university and other tertiary educational institutions.

The subjects taught at the school are English, mathematics, physics, chemistry, biology, history, economics, accounting, business studies, geography, and physical education. In 2021 it was equipped with 40 new computers.

== Former students ==
- John Rosso, deputy prime minister of PNG
