= Margarete Mitscherlich-Nielsen =

German psychoanalyst

- Born: 17 July 1917; Gråsten, Denmark
- Died: 12 June 2012 (aged 94); Frankfurt, Germany
- Education: University of Tübingen
- Spouse: Alexander Mitscherlich
- Awards: 2001 Order of Merit of the Federal Republic of Germany
- Scientific career
- Fields: Psychology

Margarete Mitscherlich-Nielsen (née Nielsen; 17 July 1917 – 12 June 2012) or the "Grande Dame of German Psychoanalysis" as she was often referred to as, was a German psychoanalyst who focused mainly on the themes of feminism, female sexuality, and the national psychology of post-war Germany.

== Life ==
Margarete Nielsen was born the youngest daughter to Doctor Nis Peter Nielsen and his school headmaster wife Margarete (Nee Leopold). Nielsen grew up in Denmark and Germany, where she studied literature and eventually received the highest possible certificate or "abitur" in 1937 from a private school located in Flensburg. After studying literature she decided to follow in her father's footsteps and study medicine at the Ludwig-Maximilians-Universität München and Heidelberg University Faculty of Medicine. She passed the first state exam in 1944 and received a doctorate from the University of Tübingen in 1950.

Her professional work with psychoanalysis began at an anthroposophical clinic in the Swiss canton of Ticino, where she met her future husband Alexander Mitscherlich. who introduced her to the works of Sigmund Freud. They married in 1955. In the 1950s, she completed her psychoanalytic training at the London institute led by Anna Freud, Melanie Klein and Michael Balint. Along with Alexander Mitscherlich, she returned to Germany, taking up work at a psychosomatic clinic her husband directed at Heidelberg, before moving to Frankfurt. In 1960, the couple became co-founders of the Sigmund-Freud-Institut dedicated to psychoanalytic research.

== Contributions to Psychology ==
From the 1960s, alongside the protagonists of the Frankfurt School, the Mitscherlichs played an important part in post-war Germany's intellectual debates, employing psychoanalytic thought for explaining the causes behind Nazi Germany and its aftermath in German society to the present day. The first major book they wrote together was Die Unfähigkeit zu trauern. Grundlagen kollektiven Verhaltens (The Inability to Mourn: Principles of Collective Behaviour), first published in 1967, discussing why The Holocaust, the war crimes, and the sentiment of guilt on the offender's part were not dealt with adequately in post-war German society.

Subsequently, Margarete Mitscherlich's interest in feminist positions grew, as she became friends with German feminist journalist Alice Schwarzer, contributing to her magazine EMMA. In the first issue of the journal in November 1977, she confessed: "Ich bin Feministin" ("I am a feminist"). At the time, she also took an active part in legal actions against anti-women depictions in popular German media. Her book Die friedfertige Frau. Eine psychoanalytische Untersuchung zur Aggression der Geschlechter (The peaceable sex: On aggression in women and men), first published in 1987, is Mitscherlich's most successful book to date, dealing with the roles women play in politics. Specifically, she discussed specific psychological cases pertaining to the potential for human aggression, the socialization of women, narcissism, loneliness, parenthood, and anti-Semitism within her writing. In the follow-up Die Zukunft ist weiblich (The future is feminine, 1987) Mitscherlich pleaded for values to become more feminine, even men's values. She is notable for the highly politicized nature of her work when many of her peers considered neutrality an essential element of psychoanalysis.

Until well into her nineties, Mitscherlich worked as a psychoanalyst, advising younger colleagues and commenting political developments in the press. In her latest book, published in 2010, aged 93, Die Radikalität des Alters. Einsichten einer Psychoanalytikerin (The Radicality of Age. Insights of a Psychoanalyst) she reflects upon her own experience of aging. She famously claimed that Germans cannot mourn.

Mitscherlich was awarded the Order of Merit of the Federal Republic of Germany in 2001. She received the Ehrenplakette der Stadt Frankfurt am Main in 1990 and the Tony-Sender-Preis der Stadt Frankfurt am Main in 2005.

Mitscherlich has a son who was born in 1949, a lawyer and executive manager. She lived in the Frankfurt Westend until her death. She died, aged 94, in Frankfurt.

== Writings ==
- With Alexander Mitscherlich: Die Unfähigkeit zu trauern. Grundlagen kollektiven Verhaltens. 1967 ISBN 3492201687
- With Alexander Mitscherlich: Die Idee des Friedens und die menschliche Aggressivität. 1969
- With Alexander Mitscherlich: Eine deutsche Art zu lieben. 1970
- Müssen wir hassen? 1972
- Das Ende der Vorbilder. 1978
- Die friedfertige Frau. 1985
- Die Zukunft ist weiblich. 1987
- Erinnerungsarbeit. 1987
- Über die Mühsal der Emanzipation. 1990
- With Brigitte Burmeister: Wir haben ein Berührungstabu. 1991. Hamburg. KleinVerlag.
- Erinnerungsarbeit – Zur Psychoanalyse der Unfähigkeit zu trauern. 1993
- Autobiografie und Lebenswerk einer Psychoanalytikerin. 2006
- Eine unbeugsame Frau. Im Gespräch mit Kathrin Tsainis und Monika Held. 2007
- Die Radikalität des Alters. Einsichten einer Psychoanalytikerin. 5th ed. 2010

== Literature ==
- Karola Brede (ed.): Befreiung zum Widerstand. Margarete Mitscherlich zum 70. Geburtstag. In celebration of her 70th birthday. 1987
- Felizitas von Schönborn: Margarete Mitscherlich. Zwischen Psychoanalyse und Frauenbewegung. Ein Porträt. 1995
- Ilse Lenz: Die Neue Frauenbewegung in Deutschland. Abschied vom kleinen Unterschied. 2008
