= Alexander Mitscherlich (psychologist) =

German psychiatrist and psychoanalyst

- Born: 20 September 1908; Munich
- Died: 26 June 1982; Frankfurt
- Occupations: University teacher, writer, medical doctor, author, opinion writer, philosopher, actor, scientist, psychoanalyst
- Spouse: Margarete Mitscherlich-Nielsen
- Children: Monika Seifert, Matthias Mitscherlich
- Awards: Friedenspreis des Deutschen Buchhandels (Heinz Kohut, 1969)

Alexander Harbord Mitscherlich (20 September 1908 – 26 June 1982) was a German psychiatrist and psychoanalyst.

== Life ==
Alexander Mitscherlich grew up in Munich and took up studies in history, the history of art, and philosophy at the Ludwig-Maximilians-Universität München. When Mitscherlich's Jewish-born dissertation thesis supervisor Paul Joachimsen died, in 1932, his chair was passed to an antisemite, Karl Alexander von Müller, who declined to take over the dissertation projects begun by his predecessor. This is why Mitscherlich left Munich for Berlin to open a bookstore there, where he sold writings critical of the current developments in Germany, bringing him to the attention of the SA. Starting in 1933, he was jailed in Germany several times as a political prisoner.

Mitscherlich immigrated to Switzerland to take up studies in medicine there, only to return to Germany in 1937. He received a doctor's degree from Heidelberg University in 1941 in neurology.

After World War II, he was an observer at the Nuremberg Trials against the Nazi physicians guilty of medical experiments and torture of the inmates of concentration camps. He worked at a clinic in Zürich where he met his future wife Margarete Mitscherlich-Nielsen. They married in 1955. It was his third marriage in all.

Alexander Mitscherlich founded the clinic for psychosomatic medicine at Heidelberg University in 1949. From 1953 he held the chair for psychosomatic medicine in Heidelberg. In 1960, together with his wife Margarete Mitscherlich he was a co-founder of the Sigmund-Freud-Institut at Frankfurt committed to psychoanalytic research. He directed the institute until 1976. From 1966 to 1973 Mitscherlich was professor for psychology at Frankfurt University.

From the 1960s, alongside the protagonists of the Frankfurt School, the Mitscherlichs played an important part in post-war Germany's intellectual debates, employing psychoanalytic thought for explaining the causes behind Nazi Germany and its aftermath in German society to the present day. The first major book they wrote together was Die Unfähigkeit zu trauern. Grundlagen kollektiven Verhaltens (The Inability to Mourn: Principles of Collective Behaviour), first published in 1967, discussing why the Holocaust, the war crimes, and the sentiment of guilt on the offender's part were not dealt with adequately in post-war German society. Mitscherlich pointed specifically to the Germans' inability to mourn their beloved leader, Adolf Hitler. Another important book Alexander Mitscherlich wrote was Die Unwirtlichkeit unserer Städte: Anstiftung zum Unfrieden (The inhospitality of our cities. A deliberate provocation) first published in 1965 that deals with the societal and psychological consequences of urban planning and architecture in post-war Germany. In that work, he calls for a substantial change in land law. Late in this period, in 1969, Mitscherlich was the analyst of author Erica Jong, who stated, "He was the first person that took me seriously as a writer. He helped me break through a lot of barriers in my work. He changed my life."

Mitscherlich was awarded the Friedenspreis des Deutschen Buchhandels in 1969. In 1973 he received the Cultural Honor Prize of the City of Munich and the Wilhelm-Leuschner-Medaille.

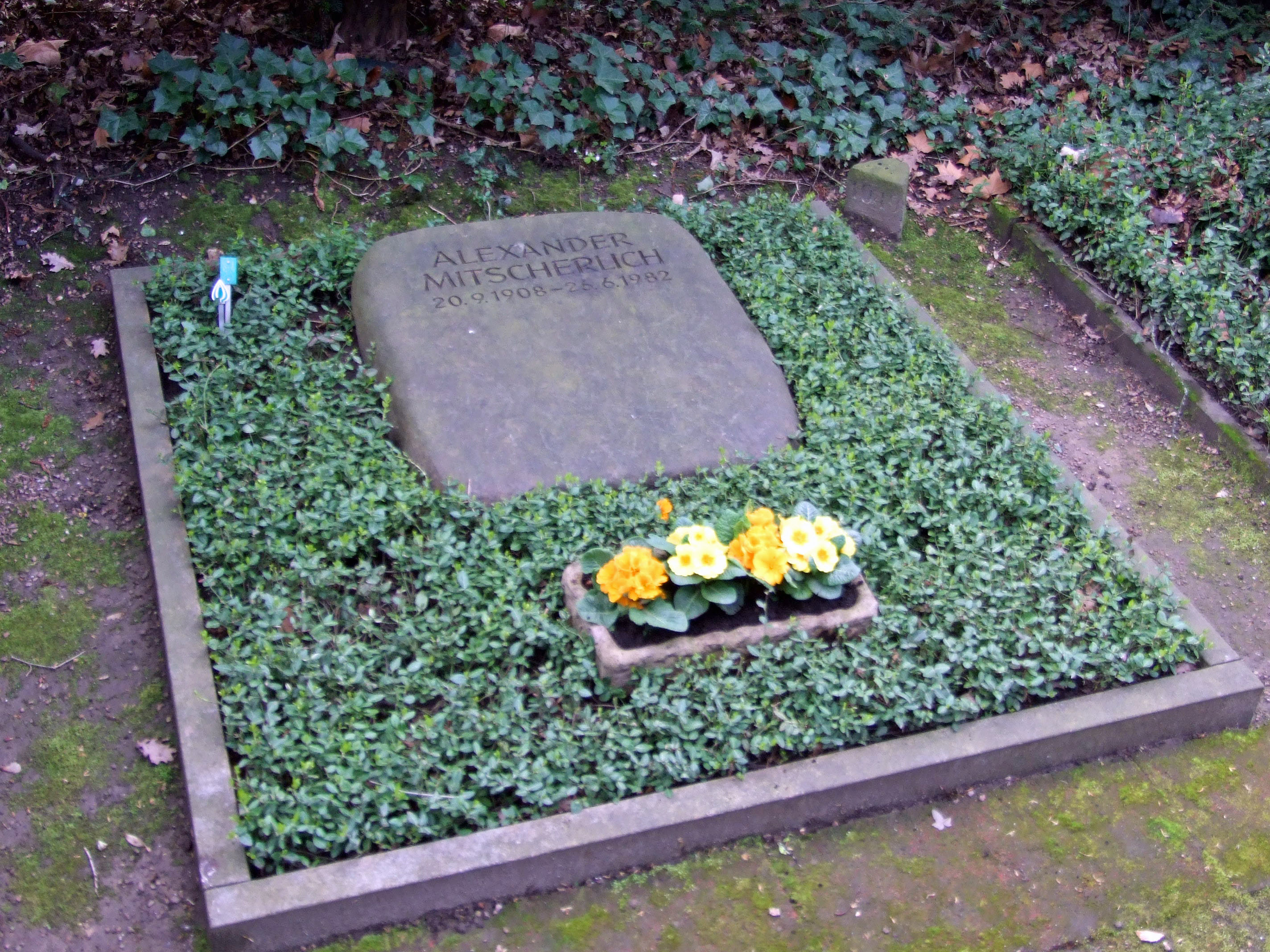
Alexander Mitscherlich's grave at Frankfurt am Main central cemetery

Alexander Mitscherlich died in Frankfurt am Main, aged 73. His bequest was handed over to Frankfurt University by his wife in 1982.

== Writings (selection) ==
- Mitscherlich, A.; Mielke, F. Das Diktat der Menschenverachtung: Eine Dokumentation (The Dictate of Contempt for Humanity: A Documentation) 1947. "Psychiatrie Im Nationalsozialismus: Erinnerung und Verantwortung. By Frank Schneider" p. 25
- Auf dem Weg zur vaterlosen Gesellschaft. Ideen zur Sozialpsychologie. 1963 (Society Without the Father: A Contribution to Social Psychology, ISBN 9780060974206)
- Die Unwirtlichkeit unserer Städte. Anstiftung zum Unfrieden. 1965
- Krankheit als Konflikt. 1966
- With Margarete Mitscherlich: Die Unfähigkeit zu trauern. Grundlagen kollektiven Verhaltens. 1967
  - Mitscherlich, Alexander (1984). The inability to mourn. New York: Grove Press. ISBN 978-0-394-62170-8.
- With Margarete Mitscherlich: Die Idee des Friedens und die menschliche Aggressivität. 1969
- With Margarete Mitscherlich: Eine deutsche Art zu lieben. 1970
- Ein Leben für die Psychoanalyse. 1980 (autobiography)

== Literature ==
- Martin Dehli: Leben als Konflikt. Zur Biographie Alexander Mitscherlichs. Wallstein Verlag, Göttingen 2007, 320 S. ISBN 3-8353-0063-6.
- Tobias Freimüller (Hg.): Psychoanalyse und Protest – Alexander Mitscherlich und die "Achtundsechziger" Wallstein Verlag, Göttingen 2008 ISBN 978-3-8353-0354-6
- Tobias Freimüller: Alexander Mitscherlich: Gesellschaftsdiagnosen und Psychoanalyse nach Hitler, Göttingen: Wallstein, 2007, ISBN 3-8353-0187-X
- Timo Hoyer: Im Getümmel der Welt. Alexander Mitscherlich – ein Porträt; Göttingen 2008
- Hans-Martin Lohmann: Alexander Mitscherlich. Reinbek bei Hamburg. 1987.
