= Robert ÆOLUS Myers =

Robert ÆOLUS Myers

Robert ÆOLUS Myers (1953-2020) was an American composer, performer and producer of new age music, and a prominent figure in the new age scene of Hawai'i in the 1980s and early 1990s. He composed four albums: Aeolian Melodies (1984), Rays (1985), The Magician (1989), and High Priestess (2006). ÆOLUS: A Retrospective, a compilation album featuring works from all four albums, was released by Aloha Got Soul Records in 2016. A compilation album including several remixes, Talisman, was released via Bandcamp on 26 April 2019.

His music consists of cinematic compositions incorporating flute, synthesizer, and percussion. His works use Western classical and indigenous compositional styling, with influences from Asian, Arabic, and African music.

== Early life and education ==
Myers held an undergraduate degree in ethnomusicology from the University of Hawai'i, a master's degree in counseling psychology with emphasis in depth psychology from Pacifica Graduate Institute, and was an initiate of Sheikh Yakzan Hugo Valdez a student of Pir Vilayat Inayat Khan of the Sufi Order in the West, of Murshid Samuel L. Lewis of Sufi Islamia Ruhaniat Society, and Suleyman Hayati Dede, Sheikh of Konya of the Mevlevi Order.

== Career ==
Myers collaborated in many performance art, experiential theatre, and modern dance presentations. He worked with Cheryl Flaharty of Iona Contemporary Dance Theatre, Valerie Bergman of Rainbow Dance Theatre, and Earnest Morgan at Volcano and Kalani Honua Dance retreats. He also performed with Tashi Leo Lightning. He was artist in residence at Volcano Arts Center on the Big Island of Hawaii, was the recipient of multiple Meet the Composer grants, performed at Expo '92 in Seville, Spain, and was a participant in the New Music Across America concert series.

Myers participated in devotional music for over 40 years. He played harmonium and sung the Cosmic Chants of Yogananda for Self Realization services, drummed for Sufi Dhikrs, played flute and percussion for the Mevlevi Turn, and was a long-time inner circle musician for the Dances of Universal Peace, led by Yakzan Hugo Valdez. Before his death, Robert was playing in support of Kirtan Wallahs.

== Discography ==
=== Albums ===
- Aeolian Melodies (1984) - Global Pacific Records in conjunction with CBS/Sony Group Inc.
- Rays (1985) - Global Pacific Records in conjunction with CBS/Sony Group Inc.
- The Magician (1989) - independent release
- High Priestess (2006) - independent release

=== Compilation albums ===
- ÆOLUS: A Retrospective
- Talisman

== See also ==
- List of ambient music artists

== Sources ==
- Bill Stone, 'New Age' Musician Stages Concert in Gothic Cathedral Hawaii Kai/East Oahu Sun Press, 16–22, Oct. 1986.
- Cary Smith, New Age Musicians Find Home Here Honolulu Star Bulletin, 31 August 1989.
- Jay Heartwell, He Doesn't Need an Orchestra The Honolulu Advertiser, 7 November 1985.
- Mike Gordon, The New Age of Music Honolulu Star-Bulletin, 5 November 1987.
- Roger Bong, ÆOLUS: An anthology from Hawaii’s new age visionary Robert ‘Aeolus’ Myers," Aloha Got Soul blog, 11 Dec. 2016.
