= List of ambient music artists =

This is a list of ambient music artists. This includes artists who have either been very important to the genre or have had a considerable amount of exposure (such as those who have been on a major label). This list does not include little-known local artists. Artists are listed by the first letter in their name (not including the words "a", "an", or "the"), and individuals are listed by last name.

== 0–9 ==
- 2002
- 2814
- 3rd Force

== A ==
- Philip Aaberg
- William Ackerman
- Adiemus
- Rudy Adrian
- Air
- Airiel
- The Album Leaf
- Giulio Aldinucci
- The Aloof
- Ambeon
- Amethystium
- The American Dollar
- Aphex Twin
- Archive
- Diane Arkenstone
- Craig Armstrong
- Ólafur Arnalds
- Ash Ra Tempel
- Atom Heart
- Augustine Leudar
- Australis
- Autechre
- Marvin Ayres

== B ==
- William Basinski
- Bad Sector
- Wally Badarou
- Julianna Barwick
- Bass Communion
- Peter Baumann
- David Bowie (on Low and "Heroes")
- Biosphere
- Bliss
- Boards of Canada
- Bohren & der Club of Gore
- Richard Bone
- Booka Shade
- Bowery Electric
- Thom Brennan
- Michael Brook
- Brunette Models
- Buckethead
- Harold Budd
- Peter Buffett
- Burial
- Burzum
- Ray Buttigieg
- Blue Foundation

== C ==
- C418
- Carbon Based Lifeforms
- The Caretaker
- Cat System Corp.
- Wendy Carlos
- Clifford Carter (member of James Taylor's band)
- centrozoon
- Craig Chaquico
- Suzanne Ciani
- Cluster
- Cocteau Twins
- Coil
- B.J. Cole (pedal steel guitarist)
- Colleen
- Conjure One, headed by Rhys Fulber
- Controlled Bleeding
- Holger Czukay
- christ.
- Chuck Wild

== D ==
- Malcolm Dalglish
- David Darling
- Darshan Ambient
- David Jolley
- Dead Can Dance
- Dead Texan, The
- deadmau5
- Death Ambient
- Death Cube K
- Deathprod
- Deep Forest
- Deerhunter
- De Facto
- Delerium
- Constance Demby
- Stuart Dempster
- Taylor Deupree
- Deuter
- Deutsch Nepal
- DJ Spooky
- Kurt Doles
- Dntel
- Suzanne Doucet
- dreamSTATE
- Kyle Bobby Dunn

== E ==
- Earth
- Earthstar
- Danielle Egnew
- Ludovico Einaudi
- Eluvium
- Emerald Web
- Emeralds
- Justin Emerle
- Enigma
- Brian Eno
- Roger Eno
- Enya
- Karlheinz Essl
- Dean Evenson
- Explosions In The Sky

== F ==
- Don Falcone
- Falling Up
- Falling You
- Fantomas
- Ryan Farish
- Florian-Ayala Fauna
- Christian Fennesz
- James Ferraro
- The Field
- Final
- The Fireman
- Jim Fox
- Christopher Franke
- Freescha
- Robert Fripp
- Eloy Fritsch
- Edgar Froese
- Ben Frost
- Frou Frou
- Future Sound of London / Amorphous Androgynous

== G ==
- Peter Gabriel
- Roopam Garg
- Gas
- Gaudi
- Philip Glass
- Grouper
- Global Communication
- Goldfrapp
- Manuel Gottsching
- Nicholas Gunn
- Guru Guru
- Guy Gerber

== H ==
- Rob Haigh
- Halo Manash
- Peter Michael Hamel
- Hammock
- Harmonia
- Jon Hassell
- Chihei Hatakeyama
- Imogen Heap
- Tom Heasley
- Tim Hecker
- Michael Hedges
- David Helpling
- Higher Intelligence Agency
- Susumu Hirasawa
- Ezekiel Honig
- Hwyl Nofio

== I ==
- Iasos
- I.E.M.
- In-Existence (Maarten van der Vleuten)
- Inon Zur
- Tetsu Inoue
- Rafael Anton Irisarri
- Irresistible Force
- Mark Isham

== J ==
- Jacaszek
- Jean Michel Jarre
- Job Karma
- Jonn Serrie
- Jónsi & Alex
- Mat Jarvis
- Karl Jenkins
- Jeff Johnson
- Jóhann Jóhannsson
- Michael Jones
- Bradley Joseph
- Journeyman

== K ==
- Karunesh
- KÁRYYN
- Kátai Tamás
- Peter Kater
- Kevin Keller
- Kevin Kern
- King Never
- Paddy Kingsland
- Kitaro
- The KLF
- Thomas Köner
- Kraftwerk
- Andrei Krylov
- Paul Kuniholm

== L ==
- Labradford
- Daniel Lanois
- David Lanz
- Laraaji
- Bill Laswell
- Thomas Leer
- Ottmar Liebert
- Lights Out Asia
- Lightwave
- Loscil
- Lotus Plaza
- Lull
- Lusine
- Lustmord
- Ray Lynch

== M ==
- M83
- Maeror Tri
- Main
- Mana ERG
- Mannheim Steamroller
- Marconi Union
- Catya Maré
- Matmos
- Keiko Matsui
- Max and Harvey
- Paul McCandless
- Loreena McKennitt
- Billy McLaughlin
- Riad Michael
- Michna
- Robert Miles
- Robyn Miller
- Mirror System
- Moby
- Moodswings
- The Moon Lay Hidden Beneath a Cloud
- Morgenstern
- Rob Mounsey
- Murcof
- Robert ÆOLUS Myers
- Mythos

== N ==
- R. Carlos Nakai (Native American flutist)
- Pete Namlook
- Andy Narell
- The Necks
- Neptune Towers
- Loren Nerell
- Neu!
- Thomas Newman
- New Order (not exclusively ambient)
- Nightnoise
- Nine Inch Nails (not exclusively ambient)
- No-Man
- Alva Noto (Carsten Nicolai)
- Michael Nyman

== O ==
- Vidna Obmana
- Obsil
- Ochre
- Odd Nosdam
- Patrick O'Hearn
- Mike Oldfield
- Coyote Oldman
- Omar Rodriguez Lopez
- Ombient
- Omni Trio
- On! Air! Library!
- The Orb
- William Orbit (Strange Cargo series)
- Orbital
- O Yuki Conjugate
- Ott

== P ==
- Craig Padilla
- Panda Bear
- Jeff Pearce
- Pendulum
- Phish (The Siket Disc in particular)
- Pink Floyd
- Pivot
- Plastikman
- Popol Vuh
- Poppy
- Porcupine Tree
- Puff Dragon
- Port Blue

== R ==
- Rabbit in the Moon
- Radiohead (Kid A)
- Radio Massacre International
- Raison D'être
- Raphael
- Red
- Robert Rich
- Robin Guthrie
- Max Richter
- Terry Riley
- Francis Rimbert
- Steve Roach
- Kim Robertson
- Hans-Joachim Roedelius
- Rothko
- Rurutia
- Röyksopp

== S ==
- Saafi Brothers
- Ryuichi Sakamoto
- Karl Sanders
- Bruno Sanfilippo
- Devin Sarno
- Erik Satie
- Janek Schaefer
- Conrad Schnitzler
- Klaus Schulze
- Scorn
- Shadowfax
- Andrew Shapiro
- Jonah Sharp
- Rhian Sheehan
- Shpongle
- Michael Shrieve
- The Sight Below
- Sigur Rós
- Single Cell Orchestra
- Slow Meadow
- Kaitlyn Aurelia Smith
- Software
- Spiral Realms
- Gary Stadler
- Stars of the Lid
- Stars Over Foy
- Michael Stearns
- Solar Fields
- Sunn O)))

== T ==
- Henrik Takkenberg
- Hirokazu Tanaka
- Tangerine Dream
- Benson Taylor
- Team Sleep
- Irv Teibel
- Telefon Tel Aviv
- Mark Templeton
- Terre Thaemlitz
- Robert Scott Thompson
- TimeShard
- Tiny Vipers
- Amon Tobin
- Devin Townsend
- Tipper
- Troum
- Tuu
- Tycho
- theta
- Trepaneringsritualen

== U ==
- Ulrich Schnauss
- The Ultraviolet Catastrophe
- Ulver
- Underworld
- The Utopia Strong

== V ==
- Vangelis
- Velvet Cacoon
- Luke Vibert (as Wagon Christ)
- Vision Eternel
- Voice of Eye

== W ==
- Kit Watkins
- Wavestar (with John Dyson)
- Carl Weingarten
- White Noise
- Steven Wilson
- Windy & Carl
- Paul Winter
- Paul Winter Consort
- Jah Wobble
- Erik Wøllo
- Woob

== Y ==
- Yanni
- Yellow Magic Orchestra
- Susumu Yokota

== Z ==
- Zero 7
- Zoviet France
