= Yakzan Hugo Valdez =

Argentine-born American religious leader

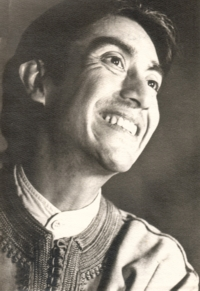

Yakzan Hugo Valdez (Hugo Salvador Valdez, Oct 20, 1937 - May 24, 1993) was a Sheikh of the Sufi Order International initiated by Pir Vilayat Inayat Khan and of the Mevlevi Order initiated by Suleyman Hayati Dede, Sheikh of Konya. Yakzan was additionally a celebrated master of the Dances of Universal Peace as originated by Samuel L. Lewis and an acknowledged peer of the Sheikhs of the Sufi Islamia Ruhaniat Society. Yakzan was a long-term resident of Honolulu, Hawaii. He established Sufi communities in Hawaii, Chile, and Spain.

Yakzan was born in Jujuy, Argentina, and was tutored as a child under the educational curriculum of Rudolf Steiner. He moved to New York City as a young man where he studied design and Ikebana. Enamored with the teachings of Pir-O-Murshid Inayat Khan as taught by his son, Pir Vilayat Inayat Khan, Yakzan received multiple initiations culminating in initiation as Sheikh of the Sufi Order. Yakzan created a series of trainings or “intensives” that distilled the teachings of Oscar Ichazo of the Arica School and the principles of Gurdjieff’s Fourth Way in combination with the tenets of Sufism as derived from the work of Ibn 'Arabi, Pir-O-Murshid Inayat Khan, Pir Vilayat Inayat Khan, and Murshid Samuel L. Lewis.

Yakzan was a charismatic teacher of Sufism, the Path of Love. A number of renowned teachers and spiritual masters visited and taught in Hawaii as guests of Yakzan and the Sufi Order of Honolulu. Among their number were Pir Vilayat Inayat Khan, Reshad Feild, Pierre Elliot of Gurdjieff’s Fourth Way and his son Hugh Elliot, Suleyman Hayati Dede, Sheikh of Konya and his son Jelaluddin Loras, Sheikh Vasheest Davenport, Shaykha Tasnim Hermila Fernandez, and Zuleikha.

== Sources / External links ==
- The Sufi Remembrance Project
- Interview With Yakzan 1991
