= The Gates of Reality =

Studio album by Australis
- Released: November 22, 2008
- Recorded: Utah, United States
- Genre: New-age, ambient
- Length: 70:13
- Label: Essential Noises
- Producer: Australis

Australis chronology
Lifegiving	The Gates of Reality	Sentient Genus

Professional ratings
Review scores
Source	Rating
Morpheus Music	(not rated)
Sonic Immersion	(not rated)
Bil Binkelman	(not rated)

The Gates of Reality (2008) is the second music album by Australis.

== History ==
The Gates of Reality was produced and recorded in Utah, United States, and was released by Australis through the label Essential Noises on November 22, 2008. Before its release, in February 2007, the now defunct Dutch publication E-dition magazine published an article about Australis in its last issue (#16) before ceasing operations. The magazine included two tracks from this album in the audio compact disc that accompanied each issue. These tracks were "The Gates of Reality" and "Paqta Kutemunqa". On December 23, 2008, the British electronic music online organization Morpheus Music interviewed Australis about the release of this album.

In contrast with Australis' first album, Lifegiving, this album took over three years to be completed and released.

== Overview ==
The Gates of Reality has fourteen musical tracks in a variety of styles that include ambient music, electronic music, ethnic music, world music and symphonic music.

Unlike his first release, this album introduces vocal elements on several of its tracks, evidence of a brand new area of musical exploration for this artist. To accomplish this, he enlisted the participation of several musical collaborators in its production: Virginia Luna, Alvaro Aguayo (who also collaborated in one track for Lifegiving), Mornie Sims and Rebecca Farraway.

One of the tracks in this album, titled "The Hoodoo's Whisper", was co-composed and co-produced by Australis and his long-time friend, the Spaniard composer–producer Roger Subirana.

As with his first release, a strong feature of The Gates of Reality is the variety of styles between its tracks. They jump from style to style in complete freedom producing a sensation of substance and diversity while causing a certain perception of being transported through several different places, cultures and/or states of mind.

Musically, this album presents a solid instrumental foundation on each track, which allows even his most simplistic tracks to remain clean and delicate; while also allowing the more dramatic and elaborated tracks to become powerful and intense.

Conceptually, Australis declares this release explores the relationship between the human being and its own imagination; taking inspiration in fantasy, in reality, and in the cryptic bonds between the two.

== Track listing ==
1. "The Gates of Reality" - 5:18
2. "Return to Tarshish" - 5:04
3. "Ephemerage" - 5:34
4. "Promises of Light" - 4:50
5. "Paqta Kutemunqa" - 4:29
6. "Purple Dreams" - 5:12
7. "Little Clockmaker" - 3:58
8. "Treasure the Moment" - 4:10
9. "Illusion of Company" - 5:56
10. "The Hoodoo's Whisper" - 5:33
11. "Thresholds of Devotion" - 4:32
12. "Momentary Truths" - 5:05
13. "Essentia" - 3:23
14. "Adventus Sortis" - 7:09

== Tracks overview ==
- The first track has the same title as the album. It starts by creating the ambient of a normal, busy city. The sound of steps approach and enter through what sounds like a heavy door. Once the door closes, the sounds of the city disappear and the listener experiences the sensation of having crossed into another dimension. A mysterious musical introduction develops into the rhythmic beginning. A simple yet engaging piano melody ensues carrying the listener into a thematic and powerful refrain. Vocal interventions together with electronic elements make this track a strong opening for the rest of the compilation.
- "Return to Tarshish", the second track, departs from the somewhat up-tempo style of the first track. From the beginning it builds a highly atmospheric sonic landscape featuring long evolving textures, sound effects and the highly evocative voice of a soprano singing in the distance. As the track develops, a slow percussion gives entrance to an introductory melody. The instrumentation on this track, although almost entirely electronic, produces the impression of a strong ethnic ambient. Arpeggios enter as the track approaches its climax, ending in an intense soprano solo.
- "Ephemerage" starts with the sound of a distant impact or explosion after which, a growing texture unchains an engaging rhythm. Electronic arpeggios set the foundation for melancholic verses followed by pre-choruses where an acoustic guitar provides a romantic twist. These elements lead to an intense refrain where electronic instruments and a piano build a dramatic segment. Vocal elements and more acoustic guitar are present later in the track as it reaches its final refrain, before evolving into the next track.
- In contrast with the preceding track, "Promises of Light" begins with a growing environmental foundation that leads to an introduction where long sequences prepare the mood - going from major to minor chords, and back - for the rhythmic second half of this track. Quickly after the percussion begins, an ethereal female voice talks in English. Although the words don't reveal the subject of this track, it suggests that the expression "promises of light" refers to children as the hope for human kind.
- Paqta Kutemunqa is the first ethnic track of this album. Although subtle electronic instruments can be identified in the background, Australis gathers again styles and instruments from his native South America to build a strong dramatic track. The piece starts with the sounds of a mountainous landscape where a male voice is speaking into the wind in a native language. The track develops quickly reaching climaxes at several spots. Charango and zampoña give this track a very distinctive character while adding to its dramatism and epic nature.
- The sixth track, Purple Dreams, changes styles presenting a slow-tempo sequence with uplifting and somewhat nostalgic connotations. Mixing electronic (synthesizers) with acoustic (accordion, piano) instruments, the piece produces a relaxing effect during its first third. After that, the music turns a little darker with a more intense rhythm in which oboes, clarinets, cello and an emotional violin outline evocative melodies. As the piece approaches its ending, it returns to the initial sequences, taking the listener back to more relaxing perceptions.
- The Little Clockmaker is the first orchestral piece of the album. It begins with an arpeggio of bells over which a lullaby-like melody - also by bells - sets an emotional and melancholic mood. From there, strings, winds, woodwinds and percussion develop into a magical yet innocent environment. In the tempo of waltz (something also seen in Australis' "The Enchantment", from Lifegiving), this piece doesn't seem to fit in the New Age genre. Instead, it genuinely falls into the classical genres.
- Treasure the Moment switches styles again, presenting some of the engaging characteristics from smooth jazz and easy listening; along with new age's characteristics like long and deep evolving pads, electronic rhythms and an overall sensation of acoustic spaciousness. Over this foundation, piano takes the bulk of the melodic responsibility, building sensible melodies for the verses and an enchanting refrain, producing uplifting and inspiring results.
- Illusion of Company is a more electronic piece. It starts with dark pads and sound effects which slowly lead to the apparition of a filtered rhythmic base, along with some arpeggios. Accordion, piano and electric guitar take turns developing the initial melodies. As the piece moves towards its middle, a highly filtered male voice intervenes speaking through several sound effects. After that, an instrumental segment ensues building towards the climax end where the male voice returns repeating some of its earlier sentences.
- The Hoodoo's Whisper is the second orchestral piece of the disc. From its structure and acoustic characteristics, this piece could fit into the soundtrack and epic genres. According to information publicly available, this track was composed by Australis together with Spaniard composer Roger Subirana. The track begins with a low pitch pad along the sounds of flutes and native wind instruments, slowly building towards a climax where ethnic rhythms take over and introduce the listener into a luminous segment where string ensembles outline victorious melodies. After that, the intensity recedes and the piece evolves to a much darker mood where chords turn into minors producing sensations of danger. The rhythm restarts with tense connotations and the orchestra swells with apprehensive shades. A distant choir adds accents here and there and even a thunder can be heard at the peak of intensity. Later however, as the piece reaches its last segment, the intensity subsides and the nature of the music returns to the positive side of emotions, taking the listener back to safety.
- The eleventh track, Thresholds of Devotion, is the only other ethnic track of this album. This one however is stylistically located in the Middle East. A dark beginning where an oriental voice introduces the listener to a rich acoustic environment, quickly presents a wide variety of peculiar instruments and voices with sounds and timbres not frequently heard in the western world. The introduction ends when the full rhythm develops and the string ensemble takes over along with strange wind instruments, creating a very well accomplished middle eastern atmosphere.
- Momentary Truths uses environmental sounds to position the listener in an open space close to what sounds like an ocean's shore. This slow-tempo piece starts with a piano outlining a nostalgic melody. As the piece develops, piano, clarinet, violin and even a trumpet go hand in hand, combining with electronic instruments as they accentuate the mood set by the introduction. A slow but contagious rhythm in the background adds fluidity to the piece, engaging the listener with sensations that go from the sad to the hopeful. Towards the end, after a violin and a trumpet measure against each other, the track finishes the same way it started: with the sounds of water on a beach.
- Essentia is the third orchestral piece of the album. It begins with a delicate melody in piano against which violins slowly grow in the background. As the string ensemble grows, a solo violin comes to introduce the listener to the climax of the piece. In contrast with the initial verse, the refrain is intense and epic with horns, oboes and a percussion that reminds battle drums. After that, the piece retreats to the delicate structure from the beginning ending in soft but emotional chords.
- The last track, "Adventus Sortis", is a return to the electronic new age genre. It begins with long, spacious pads that quickly lead to vocal gregorian interventions that remind of the early music of Enigma. Quickly taking a darker turn, an exotic rhythm starts as the introduction to long verses. The verses consist of electronic leads along with synthesized winds, again, bringing the early music of Enigma to mind. Oboe and other woodwind instruments can also be heard as the track progresses. Towards the middle of the track, the piece changes its structure. First the rhythm disappears in the back and the music gives place to another gregorian choir intervention. After that the rhythm starts again ensuing the long yet intense last segments. The refrain is repeated several times, each one more complex and elaborated than the previous one. Finally, the last refrain is reached in a climax of instrumentation that leads to the last gregorian participation before the track ends dramatically.

== Personnel ==
- Australis (Oscar Aguayo) - composer, record producer
- Virginia Luna - collaborator, vocalist in "The Gates of Reality"
- Alvaro Aguayo - collaborator, charango player and vocalist in "Paqta Kutemunqa"
- Roger Subirana - co-composer and co-producer in "The Hoodoo's Whisper"
- Mornie Sims - collaborator, singer in "Return to Tarshish"
- Rebecca Farraway - collaborator, vocalist in "Promises of Light"
