= Augustine Leudar =

British musical artist (born 1972)

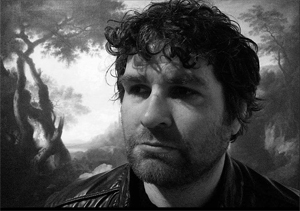
- Leudar in 2018

Background information
- Born: 27 December 1972 (age 53); Farnham, Surrey, England
- Genres: 3D sound art, sound collage, sound installation
- Instruments: Synthesizers, keyboards, guitar, trumpet, Max Msp
- Label: Le Colibri Nécrophile
- Website: www.augustineleudar.com

Augustine Leudar is a British sonic artist, known for large-scale walk-through surround sound installations,(the largest covering 7 acres with 3d sound), as well as audio holophony, and often surreal sonic illusions . Leudar frequently cites the natural world as an important source of inspiration as well as the Surrealist and Renaissance Arts Movements. Leudar has pioneered several techniques in spatial audio and sound art including miniature 3D sound installation Spatial sound in forest environments sonifying electrical signals in the mycorrhizal network interactive 3D sound art archaeoacoustics and 3D sound with Haptics sensor technologies and visual arts He is known for using highly irregular spatial speaker arrays with speakers inside the array rather than domes or circles.

== History ==
He was born in Farnham, England in 1972 and attended Vinehall preparatory school. He then moved to Manchester where he attended Stretford Grammar School and started playing synths in various noise bands in Manchester. After living in the Peruvian Amazon for ten years, he returned to the UK to study sonic art at Middlesex University. He subsequently completed a master's degree in sonic art and 3D sound at the Sonic Arts Research center in Belfast, where he also completed a PhD in 3D sound art and plant electrophysiology.

== Work ==
Leudars work 'Mexico Magico" featured at Royal Botanic Gardens, Kew. Soundscapes created in Peru were featured at Pragues' national gallery, the Rudolfinum in 2006, as part of the Impresse exhibition and accompanied the paintings of Czech painter Otto Placht. He created one of the largest 3D sound-art installation in the world at the tropical Biome at the Eden Project, in Cornwall, England, and other large scale installations for many events including Glastonbury's Shangri La, and Futuresonic in Manchester. Recently several multichannel sound installations in forests and botanic gardens across Europe and South America have sonified electrical signalling in plants and forests. Leudar is artistic director of immersive art studio "Magik Door".

== Biomes at Night ==
This was the largest indoor multispeaker sound art installation in the world. It covered several acres inside the Eden Project's Tropical Biome (the largest captive rainforest in the world) through which the listener walked. The installation immersed members of the public in both the real sounds of the rainforest as well as "mysterious and magical" sounds inspired by the mythology of the Amazon rainforest. Leudar subsequently created several more installations at the Eden project including "Heart of Darkness"

== Otherworld ==
Otherworld is an ongoing development of an immersive installation which covers several acres of parkland created by Leudar. It incorporates mythological themes as well as advanced interactive and immersive 3D audio-visual content. It was first delivered at the Hastings Storytelling Festival in 2019.

== Holomorph ==
Holomorph was one of the world's first public exhibitions of interactive 3D sound art. Originally developed at the Sunflower Festival in Northern Ireland and subsequently displayed at various locations in Europe.

== The Stone Tapes ==
This was a very large immersive 3D audio installation covering a 6.9 acre Neolithic site encircled by an 11-foot high bank called the Giants Ring in Northern Ireland informed partly by archaeoacoustics. The event took place in the late afternoon and evening, so by dusk and moonlight, the audience circled the site and were surrounded by sounds reflecting from the walls of the henge.

== Garden of Membranes ==
Garden of Membranes was a miniature multi-channel sound installation which revealed hidden processes latent in the biosphere, and was a combination of science and sound art. The installation consisted of a miniature jungle which had a number of tiny hidden speakers within it as well as larger speakers around the room. The sounds coming from the tiny jungle were part composition and part sonic map recorded in the Amazon rain forest. It is thought to be one of the first 3D sound installations that experimented with miniature multichannel arrays interacting with larger ones. The piece was exhibited in Bolivia and Ireland.

== See also ==
- List of ambient music artists
