= Edward Shearmur =

British film composer (born 1966)

- Also known as: Ed Shearmur
- Born: 28 February 1966 (age 60); London, England, United Kingdom
- Occupation: Film score composer

Edward Shearmur (also known as Ed Shearmur; born 28 February 1966) is a British film composer. Born in London, England, at age seven he sang in the boys' choir at Westminster Cathedral. Educated at Eton College, he studied at the Royal College of Music and went on to a scholarship at Pembroke College, Cambridge. He worked as orchestration and conducting assistant to Michael Kamen on such films as Licence to Kill, Die Hard, Lethal Weapon and the acclaimed Don Juan DeMarco before scoring his first full-length feature film The Cement Garden which won the director's prize at the Berlin Film Festival. His first major feature score was that of The Wings of the Dove (1997). He has since scored a diverse range of popular films, including both Charlie's Angels outings, Cruel Intentions, Species II, and K-PAX.

In 2023 he composed the soundtrack for the film adaptation of Ernest Hemingway's last novel Across the River and into the Trees.

In addition to his film work, Shearmur has collaborated as keyboardist and arranger with a number of prominent rock musicians, including Eric Clapton, Peter Gabriel, Annie Lennox, Pink Floyd, Marianne Faithfull, Bryan Adams, Echo & the Bunnymen, and Jimmy Page and Robert Plant.

Ambient artist David Helpling has cited Shearmur's compositional style as a major influence on his work.

Shearmur was married to film producer Allison Shearmur (née Brecker) until her death from lung cancer in January 2018. They have two children.

== Filmography ==
=== Film ===
- Sylvia Hates Sam (1993) (short film)
- The Cement Garden (1993)
- Demon Knight (1995)
- The Leading Man (1996)
- Remember Me? (1997)
- The Wings of the Dove (1997)
- The Hunchback (1997)
- Girls' Night (1998)
- Species II (1998)
- Martha, Meet Frank, Daniel and Laurence (1998)
- The Governess (1998)
- Cruel Intentions (1999)
- Jakob the Liar (1999)
- Blue Streak (1999)
- Things You Can Tell Just by Looking at Her (2000)
- Whatever It Takes (2000)
- Charlie's Angels (2000)
- Miss Congeniality (2000)
- The Brightness You Keep (2000) (short film)
- K-PAX (2001)
- The Count of Monte Cristo (2002)
- The Sweetest Thing (2002)
- Reign of Fire (2002)
- Johnny English (2003)
- Charlie's Angels: Full Throttle (2003)
- Win a Date with Tad Hamilton! (2004)
- Laws of Attraction (2004)
- Wimbledon (2004)
- Sky Captain and the World of Tomorrow (2004)
- Nine Lives (2005)
- Bad News Bears (2005)
- The Skeleton Key (2005)
- Four Brothers (2005) – Additional Music Composed and Conducted by
- Derailed (2005)
- Dedication (2006)
- The Ex (2006)
- Epic Movie (2007)
- 88 Minutes (2007)
- Meet Bill (2007)
- College Road Trip (2008)
- The Merry Gentleman (2008)
- The Other Boleyn Girl (2008) – (rejected score)
- Passengers (2008)
- Righteous Kill (2008)
- Coraline (2009) – Additional Music
- Bride Wars (2009)
- Mother and Child (2009)
- The Winning Season (2009)
- The Wolfman (2010) – Additional Music
- Furry Vengeance (2010)
- Diary of a Wimpy Kid: Rodrick Rules (2011)
- Abduction (2011)
- The Babymakers (2012)
- Spinning Plates (2012)
- Diary of a Wimpy Kid: Dog Days (2012)
- The Polar Bears (2012)
- Before I Go to Sleep (2014)
- She's Funny That Way (2014)
- Curve (2015)
- Elvis & Nixon (2016)
- Dying Laughing (2016)
- Diary of a Wimpy Kid: The Long Haul (2017)
- Falling Inn Love (2019)
- Four Good Days (2020)
- Across the River and into the Trees (2024)
- Uglies (2024)

=== Television ===
- Manchester Prep (1999) (Re-edited into straight-to-video release Cruel Intentions 2).
- Masters of Horror (2005–2006)
- The Starter Wife (2007)
- Masters of Science Fiction (2007)
- The Starter Wife (2008)
- Devious Maids (2013–2016)
- The Outcast (2015)
- Reg (2016)
- Cruel Intentions (2016) (Pilot for NBC)
