= Isle of Grain (album) =

Studio album by One More Grain
- Released: 2008
- Recorded: London
- Genre: Alternative rock Experimental music Spoken word Drone music Fusion (music)
- Label: White Heat Records
- Producer: Andrew Blick, Daniel Patrick Quinn

One More Grain chronology
Pigeon English (2007)	Isle of Grain (2008)

Isle of Grain is the second and final album by London-based experimental rock group One More Grain.

== Track listing ==
All tracks written by Daniel Patrick Quinn/Andrew Blick/Merek Cooper/Laurie Waller except where noted.

1. "Confession Time" - 4:15
2. "A Town Is What You Make It" - 4:20
3. "Jon Hassellhoff" (Daniel Patrick Quinn/Andrew Blick/Dudu Froment/Gal Moore) - 5:21
4. "Lad With A Balloon" - 3:46
5. "Under Night Streets" (Daniel Patrick Quinn/Andrew Blick/Robin Blick/Dudu Froment/Laurie Waller) - 5:17
6. "Having A Ball" - 3:13
7. "Figure Of Eight" (Daniel Patrick Quinn/Andrew Blick/Dudu Froment/Gal Moore) - 4:55
8. "Walking Off The Map" (Daniel Patrick Quinn/Andrew Blick/Robin Blick/Dudu Froment/Gal Moore) - 4:25

== Personnel ==
- Daniel Patrick Quinn - vocals, Juno synthesizer, guitar, violin, harmonica, oud, wine glasses, gas canisters, maracas
- Andrew Blick - trumpet (& trumpet mouthpiece), programming, sound treatments, laptop computer, garagak, tbilet
- Merek Cooper - bass guitar
- Laurie Waller - drums & percussion

=== Additional musicians ===
- Dudu Fremont - fretless bass guitar
- Gal Moore - drums
- Robin Blick - clarinet, tenor saxophone
