= Spheric =

Spheric may refer to:

- An alternate word for spherical
- Radio atmospheric, a lightning-generated electromagnetic signal
- Spheric, a 1998 album by Ray Buttigieg
- "Spheric", a song by American violinist Michael Galasso from the 2005 album High Lines
