= Shabda Kahn =

Pir of the Sufi Ruhaniat International

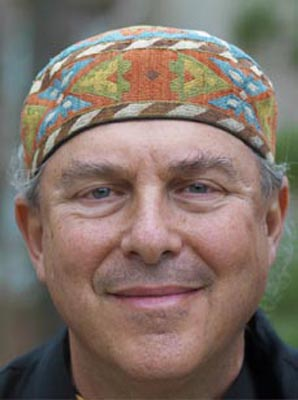
Pir Shabda Kahn

Shabda Kahn is an American spiritual leader, who serves as Pir (spiritual director) of the Sufi Ruhaniat International, a branch within the spiritual lineage of Pir-o-Murshid Hazrat Inayat Khan. He is also a teacher and performer of Hindustani classical vocal music, Raga, in the Kirana Gharana style, serving as director of the Chisti Sabri School of Music, within the lineage of his teacher Pandit Pran Nath, at whose direction this school was formed and placed in Shabda Kahn's care.

== Early life ==
Peter Kahn "was born to German Jewish refugees in New York. His parents were not particularly religious in the traditional sense, but he remembers his father standing by the window and praying."

== Spiritual biography ==
Shabda Kahn received bayat (initiation) from his teacher Murshid Samuel L. Lewis (Sufi Ahmed Murad Chisti, "Murshid Sam"), a disciple of Pir-o-Murshid Inayat Khan, in 1969. He served as his personal assistant during the fall of 1970, shortly before Murshid Sam's death. He then served as an assistant to Murshid Sam's successor, Pir Moineddin Jablonski, throughout the 1970s. He was given responsibility for leading dance and practice meetings in the San Francisco Bay Area, when Pir Moineddin's health left him unable to do so himself.

At the request of Pir Moineddin, Shabda Kahn was initiated as a Sheikh (spiritual guide) in 1977 by Pir Vilayat Khan, eldest son of Inayat Khan, at the tomb of Pir-o-Murshid Inayat Khan in Delhi, on the occasion of Inayat Khan's 50th Urs (death anniversary). He was initiated as a Murshid (senior spiritual guide) in 1997 by Pir Hidayat Inayat Khan, son of Inayat Khan. In 2001, at the death of Pir Moineddin Jablonski, Shabda Kahn succeeded him as Pir of the Sufi Ruhaniat International, by Pir Moineddin's appointment. Shabda Kahn is also a disciple of the illustrious Tibetan master, the 12th Tai Situ Rinpoche, and was deeply influenced by his twenty-two year relationship with the great American mystic Joe Miller.

As Pir, Shabda Kahn directs the leadership circle of the Sufi Ruhaniat International as well as its board of trustees, and serves as spiritual director for the Dances of Universal Peace, worldwide.

== Publications ==
Along with Imam Bilal Hyde, Faisal Muqaddam, and Murshid Wali Ali Meyer, Shabda Kahn is co-author of Physicians of the Heart, A Sufi View of the 99 Names of Allah.

Shabda Kahn has released over 9 digital recordings of his musical work and teaching.
