= Pigeon English (album) =

Studio album by One More Grain
- Released: 2007
- Recorded: Alchemea, London, August 2006
- Genre: Alternative rock Experimental music Spoken word Drone music Fusion (music)
- Length: 32:00
- Label: Victory Garden Records
- Producer: Lora Hemy, Daniel Patrick Quinn, David Naughton

One More Grain chronology
Pigeon English (2007)	Isle of Grain (2008)

Professional ratings
Review scores
Source	Rating
Drowned In Sound	link
Sunday Times	link

Pigeon English is the debut album by London-based experimental rock group One More Grain.

== Track listing ==
All tracks written by One More Grain except "Northern" by Daniel Patrick Quinn

1. "A Shout In The Street" – 4:36
2. "Tropical Mother-in-Law" – 3:56
3. "Against King Moron" – 4:30
4. "Northern" – 4:50
5. "I'm On My Way" – 4:33
6. "Down Roman Road" – 5:10
7. "Won't Get Fooled Again" – 4:25

== Personnel ==
Daniel Patrick Quinn
vocals, synthesizer, guitar, violin
Andrew Blick
trumpet, sound treatments
Dudu Froment
bass
Gal Moore
drums
