= Heasley =

Heasley is a surname. Notable people with the surname include:

- Derek Heasley (born 1972), Irish cricket player
- Jonathan Heasley (born 1997), American baseball player
- Marla Heasley (born 1959), American film and TV actress
- Tom Heasley, American musician

== See also ==
- 14564 Heasley, main-belt asteroid
- Healey (surname)
