= Evermind =

Evermind may refer to:

- Evermind (Dune), the title of the leader of Thinking Machines from Dune series
- Evermind (album), an album of Amethystium, a Norwegian musical project
- A fictional flower in J. R. R. Tolkien's Middle-earth universe
