= Cyprus–Poland relations =

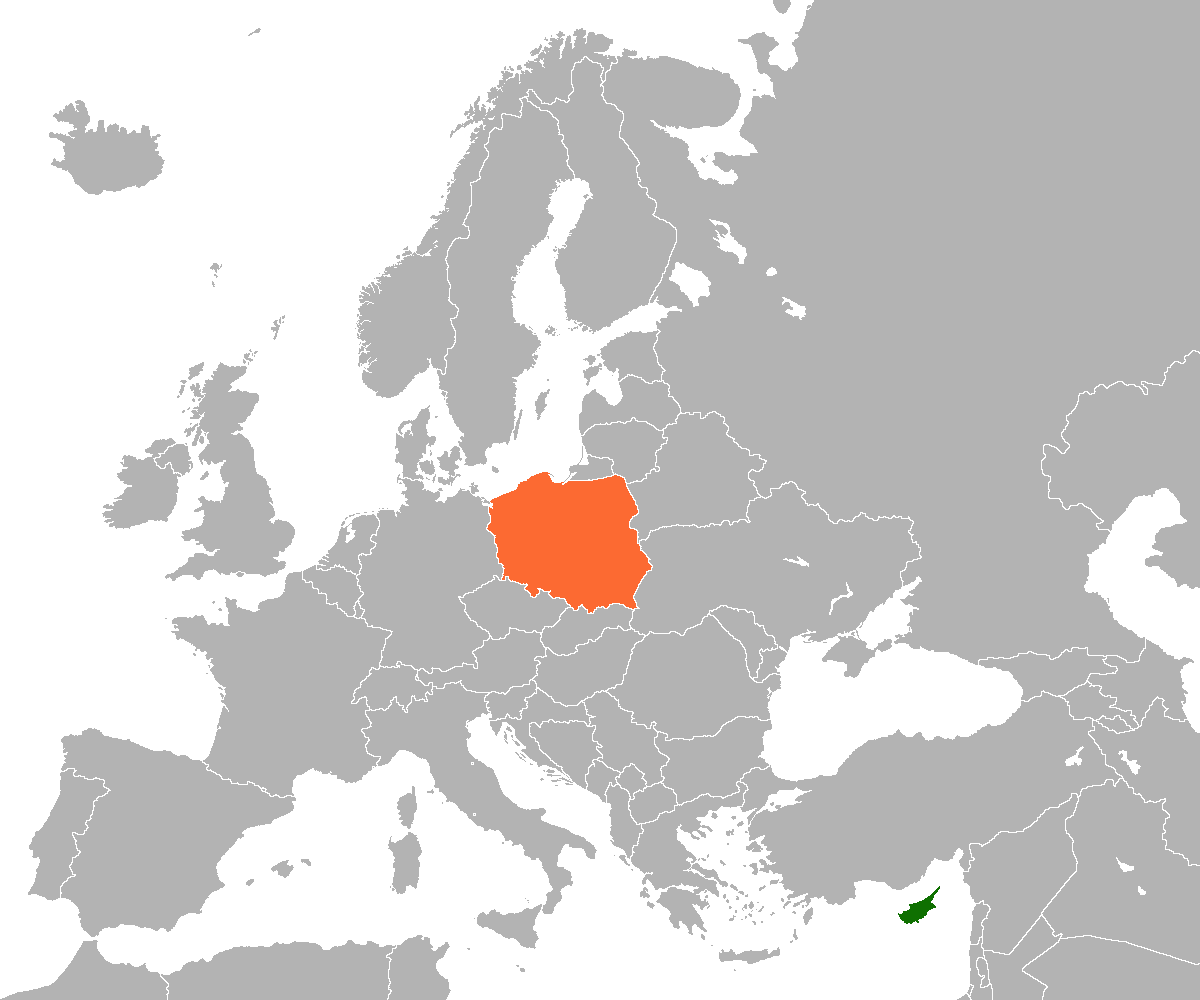
- Cyprus: Poland

Diplomatic mission
- Embassy of Cyprus, Warsaw: Embassy of Poland, Nicosia

Cyprus–Poland relations are foreign relations between Cyprus and Poland. Diplomatic relations between both countries were established during the 1960s. Cyprus has an embassy in Warsaw. Poland has an embassy in Nicosia. The two countries share membership of the European Union and Council of Europe and Organization for Security and Co-operation in Europe. The two countries became members of the EU in 2004.

== History ==
One of the first recorded contacts between Poland and Cyprus was in 1364, during a meeting of kings, princes and noblemen at the famous Congress of Kraków. One of its participants was king Peter I of Cyprus, who was trying to drum up support for a crusade to liberate the Holy Land. Throughout the Middle Ages, Polish travelers en route to Jerusalem via the Mediterranean route would often stop in Cyprus, and some settled there permanently. A prominent visitor was Boguslaw X the Great, ruler of West Pomerania, in April 1497. However, with the conquest of Cyprus by the Ottoman Empire in 1570, contact between the two countries ceased for almost 300 years. In the 19th century Polish travelers again started visiting Cyprus, with growing numbers after the British gained control of the island after the Russo-Turkish War (1877–1878). During the Second World War 500 refugee Polish dignitaries and their families arrived in Cyprus in September 1940. Among them was the writer Melchior Wankowicz.

== Cultural ties ==
The Polish people are predominantly Roman Catholic, but the Polish Orthodox Church has a significant following in the east of Poland and is in full communion with the Cypriot Orthodox Church. Both churches have suffered oppression in their countries. In 2009, Archbishop Leon of Karelia and all Finland suggested that Cyprus, Poland and the Finnish Orthodox Church claim the restoration of their cultural heritage from the EU.

Artistic group of musicians from the Anadyomene' Secret Rec. label is a Polish-Cypriot activity. It is a combination of artists born in Poland and artists working in Cyprus (i.e. Agnes de Venice, Xenia Agapene, Brunette Models, Eremites Katoteros etc.) under the influence of both cultures, as for example a Christian mysticism as a possible prayer to God from Catholic Church influence and the musical prayer, as a kind of hesychasm from Cypriot Orthodox Church influence.

== Official contacts ==
Between 1971 and 2000, Poland and Cyprus concluded 15 agreements on subject such as air transport, trade, visas, shipping and taxation. For example, in September 1998 the countries signed an agreement in Nicosia that defined exchanges in the fields of science, education, culture, art, archaeology, sports and communications. In August 2008, the Polish Ambassador in Nicosia Zbigniew Szymanski said that since EU accession the two countries have found additional areas for closer cooperation, and stressed the close contacts between the leaders of Poland and Cyprus. He also referred to planning for the joint presidency of the EU by Cyprus, Poland and Denmark. Poland will take over the EU presidency in the second half of 2011, followed by Denmark and Cyprus. Leaders of the three countries are committed to joint action on the economic crisis and the EU's 2014-2020 budget.

== Poles in Cyprus ==
Since both Cyprus and Poland became members of the European Union in May 2004, perhaps 350 Poles have established permanent residence in Cyprus, and 2,500 Polish workers are temporary residents of the island. A Polish school established in 1999 helps children of Polish parents to maintain language skills and knowledge of Poland.

== Economic links ==
The Cyprus-Polish Business Association, officially sponsored by the Polish and Cypriot governments and with many Cypriot/Polish businesses as members, works to bring people of the two countries into closer contact and develop their relations on many different levels. The efficient, low-rate business taxes in Cyprus and the tax treaty between Cyprus and Poland favor entrepreneurs who decide to base their company in Cyprus although doing business in Poland. A number of companies have taken advantage of this opportunity.

== Transport links ==
Ryanair and Polish airlines Buzz, Enter Air, LOT Polish Airlines and Wizz Air operate flights between Poland and Cyprus.

== Resident diplomatic missions ==
- Cyprus has an embassy in Warsaw.
- Poland has an embassy in Nicosia.
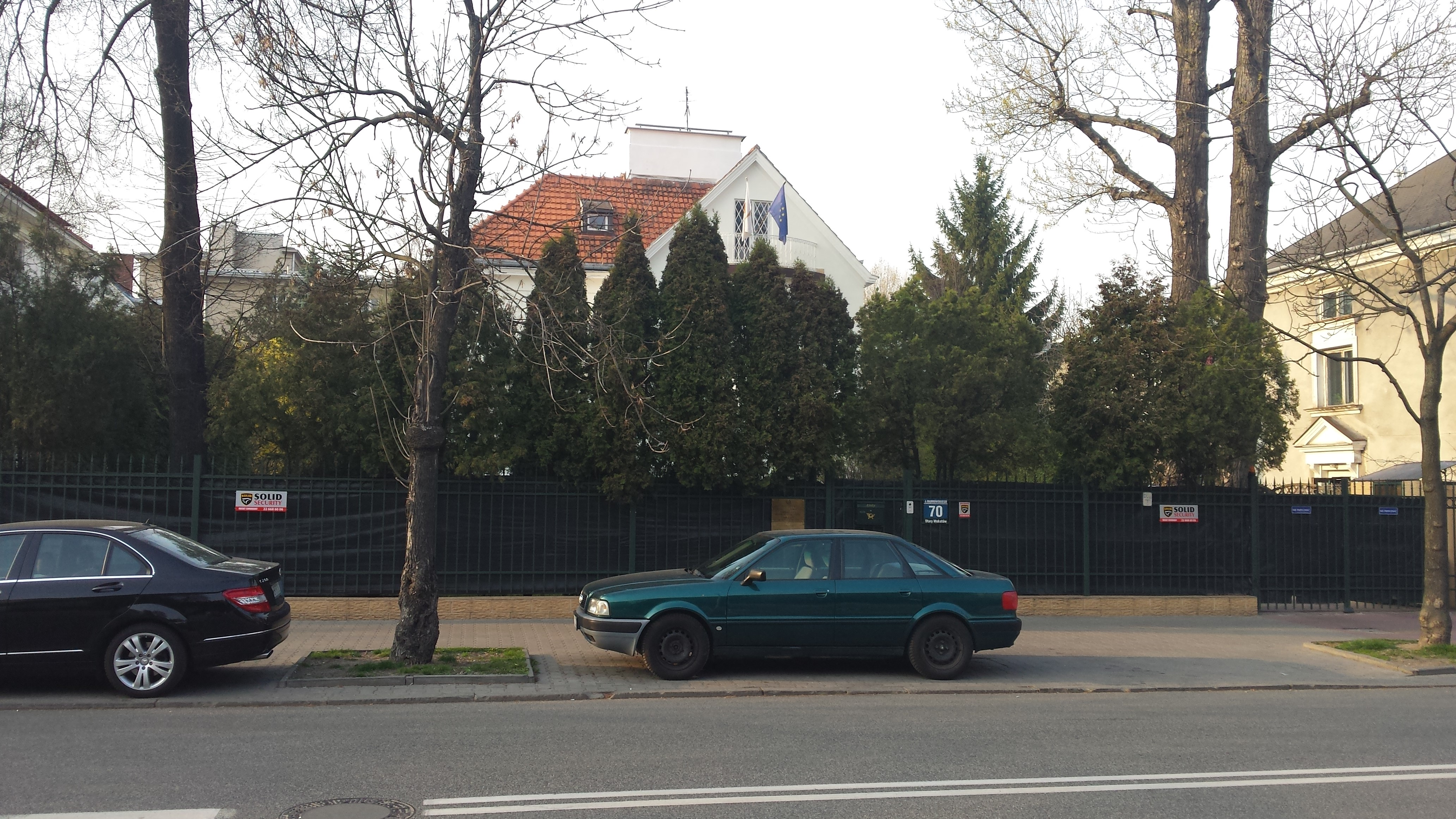
Embassy of Cyprus in Warsaw

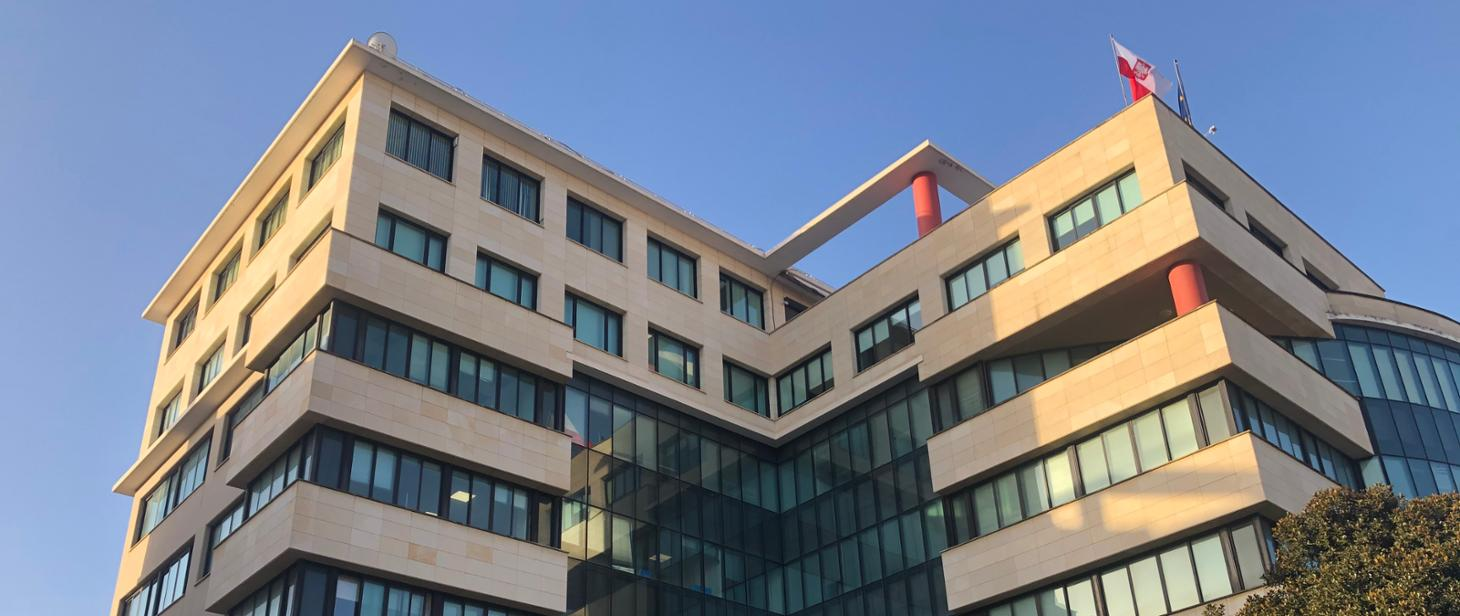
Embassy of Poland in Nicosia

== See also ==
- Foreign relations of Cyprus
- Foreign relations of Poland
