= Adam Marsland =

American singer-songwriter (born 1971)

Adam Marsland (born March 24, 1971) is an American singer, songwriter, producer, and multi-instrumentalist.

He was born on March 24, 1971, in Greene, New York, United States. He is best known as the leader of 1990s power pop band Cockeyed Ghost and later for extensive touring and sideman work. He has recorded 11 albums, produced 10 others, toured the U.S. and Europe and worked with such artists as various Beach Boys, The Standells and the legendary Wrecking Crew.

== Music career ==
=== Cockeyed Ghost (1994–2001) ===
Marsland relocated to Los Angeles and formed punk-flavored power pop band Cockeyed Ghost in 1994. Along with bands such as The Negro Problem, Baby Lemonade and Wondermints, Marsland and Cockeyed Ghost were part of the mid-1990s "pop underground" in Los Angeles and signed to Rykodisc-distributed indie label Big Deal in 1996. The band's debut album Keep Yourself Amused followed shortly thereafter and was acclaimed by The New York Press as "finest debut album of the rapidly aging year.". The band was noted for its high energy and work ethic, performing at the SXSW festival and touring with labelmates Shonen Knife, as well as opening for Fastball, Redd Kross, Third Eye Blind and others. The band was also featured on the cover of L.A. Weekly in November 1997 and appeared briefly in the television movie Friends 'Til The End that same year.

Cockeyed Ghost made two further albums for Big Deal, Neverest and The Scapegoat Factory, the release of which coincided with Big Deal's bankruptcy in early 1999. Cockeyed Ghost released their final album, Ludlow 6:18, in 2001 on Marsland's own Karma Frog label.

=== First solo releases (2001–2004) ===
Marsland embarked on a series of coast-to-coast solo tours, performing hundreds of shows a year and establishing a reputation as a DIY workhorse. He released his debut solo album, the live CD 232 Days on the Road, in 2002. The album was produced by Robbie Rist, who also participated in sessions for The Scapegoat Factory.

=== Chaos Band (2004–2008) ===
Marsland's album You Don't Know Me was released in 2004 and featured the first appearance of his "Chaos Band," inaugurating a long-running collaboration with soulstress Evie Sands. Ex-Cockeyed Ghost guitarist Severo Jornacion also performed with the band until joining the Smithereens in 2006.

With the Chaos Band and Alan Boyd, Marsland released Long Promised Road: Songs of Dennis and Carl Wilson Live in 2007, recorded by Grammy-winning Beach Boys engineer Mark Linett. A highlight of the album was the, currently unavailable at the time, version of Dennis Wilson's 1971 unreleased composition, "(Wouldn’t It Be Nice To) Live Again," featuring Sands on lead vocals.

=== Second solo releases (2008–2017) ===
Marsland returned to his original music with the compilation album Daylight Kissing Night in 2008. Marsland followed in 2009 with a 23-track double album, Go West, and six months later with Hello Cleveland, which was recorded on the road in less than 9 hours. Both Daylight Kissing Night and Go West briefly charted on Amazon's top 40 best seller list on the strength of a grass-roots push to fans. After a three-year hiatus, he released The Owl and the Full Moon in Spring 2013, which was promoted by tours in the US and, for the first time, Europe. Four years later, he released the southeast Asian-influenced Bulé, partly recorded in Bali.

== Other notable achievements ==
Aside from his songwriting, Marsland has an extensive resume as a sideman in various capacities including guitar, keyboards, and vocals. His more notable credits include working with 2008 Tony Award winner Stew/The Negro Problem, members of the Beach Boys, The Wrecking Crew, Davie Allan, Wondermints, Carnie and Wendy Wilson of Wilson Philips, and many others. He performed on Badfinger vocalist Pete Ham's posthumous 7 Park Avenue album and was a member of a latter-day incarnation of the Standells, as vocalist/guitarist prior to leaving the band in 2011. That same year he also participated in comeback shows by SST art-punk band Trotsky Icepick and longtime collaborator Evie Sands. His numerous production credits include Beach Boy David Marks' 2016 album Back in the Garage. He also operates Karma Frog Studio.

== Discography ==
| Date | Label | Title | Released by |
|---|---|---|---|
| September 1996 | Big Deal 9031-2 | Keep Yourself Amused | Cockeyed Ghost |
| September 1997 | Big Deal 9048-2 | Neverest | Cockeyed Ghost |
| February 1999 | Big Deal 9060-2 | The Scapegoat factory | Cockeyed Ghost |
| April 2001 | Karma Frog 618 | Ludlow 6:18 | Cockeyed Ghost |
| October 2002 | Karma Frog 619 | 232 Days on the Road | Adam Marsland |
| October 2004 | Karma Frog 620 | You Don't Know Me | Adam Marsland |
| March 2007 | Karma Frog 622 | Long Promised Road: Songs of Dennis and Carl Wilson Live | Adam Marsland's Chaos Band |
| March 2008 | Karma Frog 623 | Daylight Kissing Night: Adam Marsland's Greatest Hits | Adam Marsland |
| August 2009 | Karma Frog 624 | Go West | Adam Marsland |
| April 2010 | Karma Frog 625 | Hello Cleveland | Adam Marsland |
| May 2013 | Karma Frog 626 | The Owl and the Full Moon | Adam Marsland |
| October 2016 | Karma Frog 633 | The Dance Divine | Pacific Soul Ltd. |
| Sep 2017 | Karma Frog 636 | Bulé | Adam Marsland |
