= Kurt Doles =

American classical composer

Kurt Doles (born August 2, 1973) is an American composer and bass clarinetist. He is best known for his slow, quiet instrumental pieces which are frequently written for unusual groups of instruments. Sometimes associated with the group of postminimalist California-based composers represented on the Cold Blue record label run by composer Jim Fox, he has collaborated with musicians DAC Crowell and Daniel Patrick Quinn on various improvised, electroacoustic ambient recording projects. Mercury, a collaboration with DAC Crowell, was released on Suilven Recordings.

== See also ==
- List of ambient music artists
