= Trotsky Icepick =

- Origin: Los Angeles, United States
- Genres: Alternative rock, Post-Rock, Experimental Rock, Jazz-Fusion
- Years active: 1983–1994, 2011, 2019-present
- Labels: SST, Poison Summer Records
- Members: Vitus Mataré (vocals, guitar); Kjehl Johansen (guitar); John Frank (drums); Tom Hofer (bass); John Talley-Jones (vocals)
- Past members: Adam Marsland (guitar/keyboard); Jamie Lennon (keyboards); John Rosewall (bass); Jason Kahn (drums); John 'Skippy' Glogovac (drums); Hunter Crowley (drums); Mike Patton (bass)

Trotsky Icepick is an American indie rock band, their name referring to Leon Trotsky and his assassination. From 1983 through 1994 the band released six albums, all on SST Records. Trotsky Icepick continues to release records into the 2020s on Poison Summer Records. Members have included alumni from LA indie groups, The Last, Urinals (100 Flowers), Middle Class, Cockeyed Ghost and Leaving Trains.

== Discography ==
- Whispering Glades / In Exile (45)
- Poison Summer (Danny & the Doorknobs) (1983), Old Scratch - reissued in 1989 as Trotsky Icepick Presents: Danny And The Doorknobs
- Poison Summer (Trotsky Icepick) (1986), SST
- Baby (1988), SST
- El Kabong (1989), SST
- The Ultraviolet Catastrophe (1991), SST
- Carpetbomb the Riff (1993), SST
- Hot Pop Hello (1994), SST
- World War X - single (2018), Poison Summer Records
- I Haunted Myself (2019), Poison Summer Records
- Acrylic - ep (2020), Poison Summer Records
