= Halo Manash =

Finnish musical group

Halo Manash is a project of Anti Ittna Haapapuro originating from Finland. It is dark ambient / experimental combining electronics, percussions, e-bowed guitars, bone flute and various other sounds. The creation process of Halo Manash began originally around 1998 as a nameless project (containing only Anti Ittna H.).

Halo Manash is part of the Helixes musical collective.

The first Halo Manash album, entitled 'Se Its En', was released via Blue Sector in which Anti also involved. However, due to various reasons, he felt a need to establish a label of his own.

The band's 2008 album, Am Kha Astrie, received a 8.5 rating from Chronicles of Chaos.

== See also ==
- List of ambient music artists
