= David Jolley =

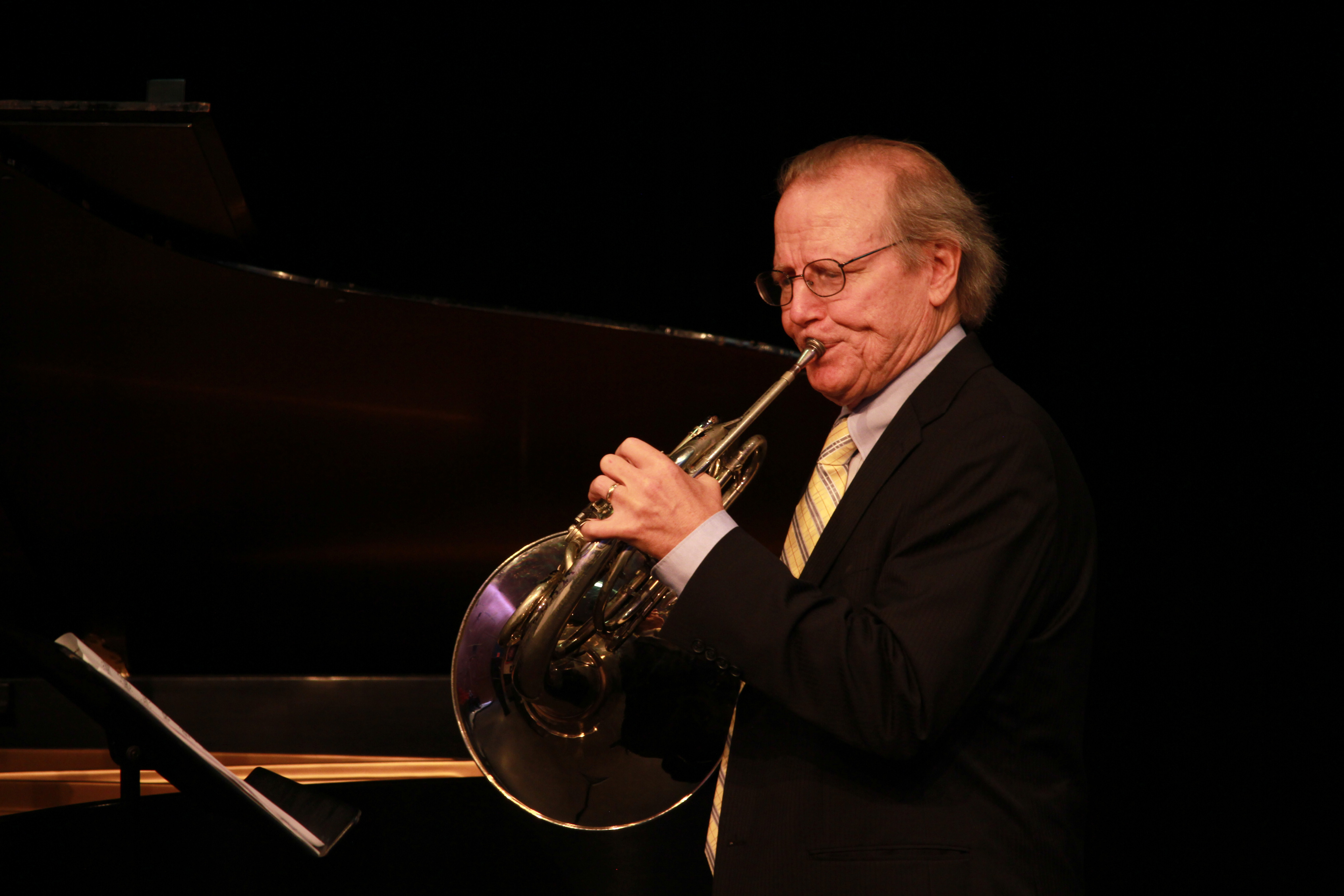
David Jolley in 2015

David Jolley is a horn soloist and chamber musician.

Jolley studied at the Juilliard School in New York. Primarily known for playing the Classical repertoire, Jolley also plays modern music. His discography includes a recording of two Mozart horn concertos with the Orpheus Chamber Orchestra. He is currently on the faculty of Mannes School of Music, Manhattan School of Music, and Queens College, City University of New York.

In 1983, he performed with the Naumburg Orchestral Concerts, in the Naumburg Bandshell, Central Park, in the summer series.

== See also ==
- List of ambient music artists
