= Job Karma =

- Origin: Wrocław, Poland
- Genres: Industrial, ambient
- Years active: 1997–present
- Members: Maciej Frett; Aureliusz Pisarzewski; Arkadiusz Bagiński
- Past members: Jacek Groszek
- Website: http://www.jobkarma.pl

Job Karma is a post-industrial-ambient band from Wrocław. It was created in 1998 by Maciej Frett (born 1973) and Aureliusz Pisarzewski (born 1974). In the first period (before 1999) Jacek Groszek (born 1973) was also a member of the band.

Performances of the group have the form of audiovisual art. Visuals are done by Arkadiusz Bagiński (born 1969) – an artist dealing with drawings, performances and visual arts.

Job Karma makes their music using sound generators and electric analogue-digital instruments, the band also fits trance rhythms, ambient textures, samples, fragments of movie dialogues and archival radio transmissions into it.

Thematically the Job Karma's compositions are focused on negative aspects and dangers of modern civilization, addressing social, political and religious issues.

From 2000 the band realizes the project „Rytuał" (Ritual), in which during live performances they join the music and music materials together with sacral and industrial architecture.

From 2001 Maciej Frett and Arkadiusz Bagiński are the organisers of the Wrocław Industrial Festival.

The musicians are in good relations with In The Nursery band and the Sheffield based record label Redroom. Their 2005 album Strike included a cover version of the track Radioactivity by Kraftwerk and a I'll Watch You Drown remix by Matt Howden of Redroom studios.

Matt Howden and Job Karma have released a new album in May 2012, Anthems Flesh, under the band name 7JK – Sieben Vs. Job Karma.

== Discography ==
- Cycles per Second, 1999, CDr (sledINmay /Poland)
- Cycles per Second, 2000, CD (Arc Ov Light /USA)
- Newson, 2001, CD (Obuh /Poland)
- 98 MHz to Extinction, 2002, mini CD (Malahit /Poland)
- Ebola, 2003, CD (Weird Amplexus /Italy)
- Ebola + Live at Ambient 2002, 2003, CD+CDr, (Amplexus /Italy)
- Strike, 2005, CD, (Ars Benevola Mater /Italy)
- Tschernobyl, 2007, CD, (Ars Benevola Mater /Italy)
- Punkt, 2010, CD, (Obuh / Poland)
- Society Suicide, 2014, CD/LP (Klanggalerie /Austria + Requiem/Poland)

under the name 7JK

- Anthems Flesh, 2012, album CD, (Redroom, England)

== Videography ==
- Oscillation Ritual, 2000, VHS, DVDr (Ars Morta Universum /Czech Republic)
- Ecce Homo, 2005, DVDr, (Ars Benevola Mater /Italy)

== See also ==
- List of ambient music artists

== Bibliography ==
- Rafał Kochan: Encyklopedia Muzyki Industrialnej VOL III (check the corresponding part on jobkarma.pl jobkarma.pl)
