= Dying Laughing =

- Poster
- Directed by: Lloyd Stanton; Paul Toogood
- Cinematography: Auston Call; John Halliday; Adam Singodia
- Edited by: Chris Dickens; Peter Norrey; Pawel Stec
- Music by: Edward Shearmur
- Release date: June 4, 2016
- Running time: 89 minutes
- Country: United States
- Language: English

Dying Laughing is a 2016 documentary film about the complicated lives of stand-up comedians and discussing all aspects of their work.

== Cast ==
- Jerry Seinfeld
- Chris Rock
- Kevin Hart
- Amy Schumer
- Sarah Silverman
- Garry Shandling
- Jamie Foxx
- Jerry Lewis
- Cedric the Entertainer
- Billy Connolly

== Release ==
The documentary premiered at the 2016 Los Angeles Film Festival in Culver City, California. It was later released for wider audiences on February 24, 2017.

== Reception ==
On the review aggregator website Rotten Tomatoes, the film has an approval rating of 82% based on 22 reviews, with an average rating of 6.30 out of 10.

For The Guardian, Gwilym Mumford gave the documentary a 3 out of 5, stating, "the endless conveyor belt of talking heads does rather lose its lustre over time, and some actual standup would've been welcome, but there's a real dizzying amount of insight, not to mention a real poignancy to some of the contributors".
