= Richard Bone =

American musician

- Born: Richard Bone; February 3, 1952 (age 74); Atlanta, Georgia
- Origin: United States
- Genres: Experimental, electronic, ambient
- Years active: 1979–present
- Labels: Quirkworks Laboratory Discs (since 1991); Eurock; Survival Records UK; AD Recordings UK
- Website: Homepage

Richard Bone (born February 3, 1952) is an American electronic musician.

== Life and career ==
Born in Atlanta, Georgia, Bone began his professional musical career creating soundtracks and scores for several off-Broadway companies working in experimental theater. In 1979, he released with his band Bone the single "Pirate the Islands/Headlines Have It" before joining the new-wave band Shox Lumania in 1981. Bone then recorded a solo 7" entitled "Digital Days/Alien Girl" on and was subsequently signed to Survival Records in the UK where he released several LPs, EPs, singles and contributed to various compilation albums. His 1983 single "Joy of Radiation" reached No. 1 on the Hong Kong Dance Chart.

Bone started the label Quirkworks Laboratory Discs in 1991, allowing him freedom to create music of a more experimental nature and retain control of his musical direction. Since then Bone has released over 25 recordings of new material and several collaborations and compilations. Of the new material recordings, three quickly rose to No. 1 on industry charts as well as receiving numerous other honors. In 2004 Bone's recording The Reality Temples was nominated for the 2004 New Age Reporter Lifestyle Music Awards' Best Electronic Album, his 2005 recording Saiyuji was nominated for the 2005 New Age Reporter Lifestyle Music Awards' Best Ambient Album, his 2007 recording Infinite Plastic Creation was awarded the 2007 New Age Reporter Lifestyle Music Awards' Best Electronic Album and his 2008 release Sudden Departure was nominated for the 2008 New Age Reporter LifeStyle Awards’ Best Ambient and Best Electronic Album.

In 2019 Bone released Empyrean Castles and A Garden of Invited Flowers.

== Discography ==
=== Solo albums ===
- Empyrean Castles, 2019, Quirkworks Laboratory Discs
- A Garden of Invited Flowers, 2019, Quirkworks Laboratory Discs
- Nibiru - Drones from the 12th Planet, 2018, Quirkworks Laboratory Discs
- Age of Falconry, 2017, Mega Dodo*AERA, 2016, USB Release, Quirkworks Laboratory Discs
- Involution Vol. 1, 2015, Quirkworks Laboratory Discs
- Vertical Life, 2014, Quirkworks Laboratory Discs
- Cranium Fizz, 2013, Quirkworks Laboratory Discs
- Anthology, 2013, AD Music UK
- Images from A Parallel World, 2013, AD Music UK
- Mind Environs, 2011 Quirkworks Laboratory Discs (soundtrack from the iTunes app)
- XesseX - The Palindrome Project, 2011, Quirkworks Laboratory Discs
- Adaptors, 2011, Prismatikone (Italy)
- Beleaguered Blossoms, 2010, Quirkworks Laboratory Discs
- The Ghosts of Hanton Village, 2009, Quirkworks Laboratory Discs
- Sudden Departure, 2008, Quirkworks Laboratory Discs
- Short Waves, 2008, Quirkworks Laboratory Discs
- Emerging Melodies (CD Re-Issue), 2008, Quirkworks Laboratory Discs
- Connection Failed, 2008, Quirkworks Laboratory Discs
- Songs From The Analog Attic, 2007, Quirkworks Laboratory Discs
- Infinite Plastic Creation, 2007, Quirkworks Laboratory Discs
- Experiments '80-'82, 2007, Quirkworks Laboratory Discs
- Serene Life of Microbes, 2006, AD Music UK
- Vesperia, 2006, Quirkworks Laboratory Discs
- Saiyuji, 2005, Quirkworks Laboratory Discs
- The Reality Temples, 2004, Spiralight Recordings
- Untold Tales, 2004, Orlandomaniac Music (Sweden)
- Alternate Realities, 2003, Spiralight Recordings
- Indium, 2002, Electroshock (Russia)
- Disorient, 2002, Quirkworks Laboratory Discs
- Alternate Worlds vol. 1 (MP3 Release), 2001, Quirkworks Laboratory Discs
- Tales from the Incantina, 2001, Indium/Quirkworks Laboratory Discs
- Ascensionism, 2000, Quirkworks Laboratory Discs
- Distillation, 1999, Halcyon
- Ether Dome, 1999, Hypnos Recordings
- Coxa, 1999, Quirkworks Laboratory Discs
- The Spectral Ships, 1998, Hypnos Recordings
- Electropica, 1998, Quirkworks Laboratory Discs
- A Survey of Remembered Things, 1997, (a shared disc with John Orsi) Quirkworks Laboratory Discs
- Metaphysic Mambo, 1996, Reversing
- The Eternal Now, 1996, Quirkworks Laboratory Discs
- Vox Orbita, 1995, Quirkworks Laboratory Discs
- Ambiento, 1994, Quirkworks Laboratory Discs
- X Considers Y, 1994, Quirkworks Laboratory Discs
- Quirkwork, 1993, Quirkworks Laboratory Discs

=== Vinyl releases ===
- Obtuse Tantrums (7” vinyl), 2015, AttractiveCO
- Brave Sketches (2x 12” vinyl), 2015, Orlandomaniac Music
- Vaulted Vsions (3x 12” vinyl), 2014, Vinyl on Demand
- X Considers Y (12” vinyl), 1994, Quirkworks Laboratory Discs
- Exspectacle (12” vinyl), 1985, Survival
- The Real Swing (12” vinyl), 1984, Survival
- Living in Partytown (12” vinyl), 1984, Survival
- Joy of Radiation (12” vinyl), 1983, Survival
- Emerging Melodies (12” vinyl), 1983, Rumble
- Brave Tales (12” vinyl), 1983, Survival
- The Beat is Elite (12” vinyl), 1982, Survival
- Joy/Do Angels Dance (7” vinyl), 1983, Survival
- Digital Days/Alien Girl (7” vinyl), 1981, Rumble/Survival
- Life in Video City (cassette), 1980, Eurock
- Quiz Party (cassette), 1980, Eurock
- Pirate the Islands/Headlines (7” vinyl), 1979, Rumble

=== Collaborations ===
- Via Poetica, 2007, (with Lisa Indish) Quirkworks Laboratory Discs
- Songs from Early Paradise (with Mary Zema), 1998, Quirkworks Laboratory Discs
- Rubber Rodeo (with Rubber Rodeo), 1982, Eat Records
- She Had To Go (with Rubber Rodeo), 1982, Eat Records
- Live at the Peppermint Lounge (with Shox Lumania), 1981, ROIR
- (I Have) No Shoes/Signals (with Shox Lumania), 1981, Rumble
- Jolene/ Who’s on Top? (with Rubber Rodeo), 1981, Rumble
- Age of Urban Heroes (with Urban Heroes), 1981, Dutch Ariola
- Headlines (with Urban Heroes), 1980, Dutch Ariola

=== Compilation tracks ===
- "Adrift" from Sounds from the Circle, 2012, NewAge Music Circle
- "Do You Hear What I Hear?" from Christmas AD, 2011, AD Music
- "The Seduction of Dr. Pasteur" from Night Music, 2010, AD Music
- "Mambopolis" from Disco For Abruzzo, 2009, Wondersounds
- "Son of Icarus" from Euphony 2, 2009, wwuh.org
- "Mutant Wisdom" from Cosmic Disco? Cosmic Rock!, 2008, Eskimo
- "The Memory of Caves" from Euphony 1, 2008, wwuh.org
- "Mambopolis" from Discotech, 2007, Electunes
- "Autotrophic Light" from Schwingunen #138, 2006, Cue-Records
- "Stillness Repeating" from Ambienism, 2004, Spiralight Recordings
- "Dzibana" from Harmony with Ambience, 2003, Windfarm Records
- "Spires" from Logan’s Run, 2002, Discos Veveos
- "Elusia, I Can See!" from Electroacoustic Music V. 3, 1999, Electroshock
- "Murmurio" from Oscillations, 1998, Halcyon
- "Via Mycropia" from The Other World, 1998, Hypnos Recordings
- "Vox 2.5" from EM:T 1197, 1997, EM:T
- "untitled" from The Answering Machine Solution, 1996, Staalplaat
- "In the Shadow of Rain" from Back to the Universe, 1996, Only Records
- "The Demon Angel", “Mi Mundo”, “Amb 7.4.53”, Amb 4.6.47”, “Anastasia Says” & “The Deluxe Set” from Media Works, 1995, Grace Pro
- "Etherea Arriving" from Maine Vocals, 1995, Reversing
- "Overstated Papers" from ANON, 1995, Von Buhler
- "Vox 9” & “Illicit Behavior" from Indiegestion Samplers # 7, 1995, Alternative Press
- "X Considers Y” & El Gato Negro" from Indiegestion Samplers # 5, 1995, Alternative Press
- "The Real Swing" from Pulse 8, 1985, Survival
- "Far from Yesterday" from Film Noir – American Style, 1984, Ding Dong
- "Living in Partytown" from The Art of Survival, 1984, Survival
- "Joy of Radiation" from Dance Report, 1983, Survival
- "Monster Movie” & “Quantum Hop" from Mind & Matter / Megamix, 1983, Survival
- "Alternative Music for the Hindenberg [sic] Lounge" from The American Music Compilation, 1982, Eurock

== See also ==
- List of ambient music artists
