= Bad Sector =

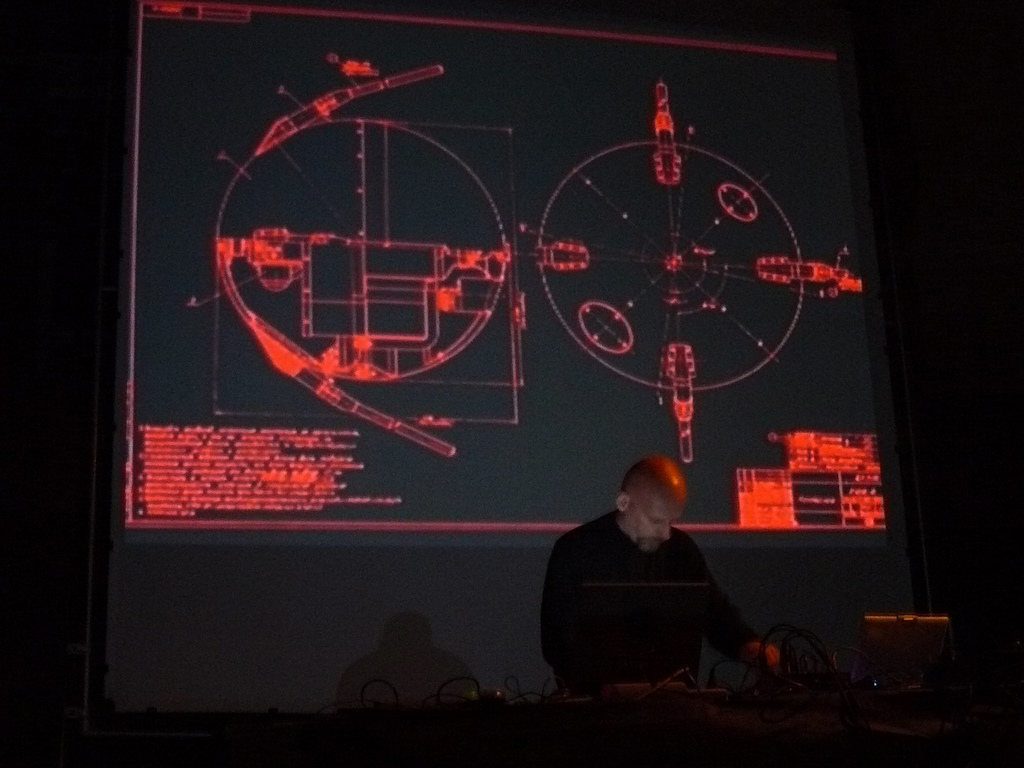
Bad Sector, live at Cantiere Sanbernardo, Pisa

Bad Sector is an ambient/noise project formed in 1992 in Tuscany, Italy by Massimo Magrini. While working at the Computer Art Lab of ISTI in Pisa (one of the CNR institutes), he developed original gesture interfaces that he uses in live performances: 'Aerial Painting Hand' (a device that tracks the position of the musician's hands in gloves of two different colors), 'UV-Stick' (an ultraviolet-illuminated stick that the musician moves in front of the camera—a computer reads its position and angle and makes changes to music generation algorithms accordingly), and others.

Bad Sector's music is considered a mixture of ambient, noise, industrial music, minimal and experimental music. Magrini himself describes it as "deeply emotional dark ambient noise". Common themes (as reflected in album and track titles) include microbiology, algorithms, physics, and space exploration.

== See also ==
- List of ambient music artists
