= Australis (musical project) =

American band

- Origin: United States
- Genres: New age, ambient, electronic, world
- Instruments: Synthesizer; Piano; Percussion; Zampona; Charango; Zurna; Darbouka
- Years active: 2004 – present
- Labels: Essential Noises; Independent Records
- Members: Oscar Aguayo
- Website: Australis' Official site Australis on Facebook

Australis is the name for the Utah based electronic new age musical project by multifaceted Peruvian-born composer/producer Oscar Aguayo, although this name is often used to refer to him directly.
He named his project "Australis" (Latin literally meaning "from the South") because that word symbolizes his origins and the places where he received his primary musical influences.

== History ==
Australis was officially created as a musical project in the U.S. in August 2004. In January 2005, he won the "2004 Morpheus Music's Best Independent Artist" award with material released only to selected online radio stations.
His debut album "Lifegiving" was independently released in May 2005.
By early 2006 "Lifegiving" was re-released in Southern Asia by the Orange Music record label. In August 2006 two tracks from Australis' debut album "Lifegiving" were included in the New Vibes Music's compilation Echoes of Tuvalu.
Work for Australis' second album, "The Gates of Reality", was announced in August 2005, and almost two years later in February 2007 two of its tracks were included in the audio compact disc accompanying the last issue (#16) of the now defunct Netherlandic publication "E-dition Magazine", despite the fact that the album was not yet released at the time.
"The Gates of Reality" was released in November 2008 under the label Essential Noises.
On June 13, 2009, Australis' official website announced work for a third release has started. The upcoming album's temporary title was "Human Genus". In early July 2010 its official title was announced as "Sentient Genus".
"Sentient Genus" was released in November 2010 under the label Essential Noises.

== Musical style ==
Under the wider new age genre, Australis' music styles include Ambient music, World music, Electronic music, Ethnic music, Symphonic music and Soundtrack. Among other adjectives, his musical signature has been described as melodic, intense, contagious, emotional and meaningful.

Australis' style is characterized by very rich instrumentation present even in his most simplistic pieces: very melodic and clearly defined leads built over solid tonal bases (consisting of deep evolving pads or full orchestral arrangements), along with engaging rhythms, often ethnically influenced.

Instrumentally, Australis' music uses the expected electronic synthesizers and samplers, bringing unusual and interesting sound effects to blend with the main musical body. However, much of his material also exhibits classical instruments which include piano, strings (solos and ensembles) and winds (clarinets, oboes, etc.). Additionally, he also includes exotic instruments for his more ethnic material: native winds and strings (zampona, charango) from the Andes regions of South America, and also from the Middle East (zurna, darbouka, etc.).
Another interesting characteristic of Australis' music is the dissimilar styles he explores and compiles in his discs. For example, the album "Lifegiving" starts with a very soft, relaxing, nature-driven title track; but the second track carries a completely different more electronic flavor. Then the third track comes and it has yet another color that falls into the category of dramatic soundtrack. Later on the disc other styles are also represented, including quasi-techno-dance "Fire Tamer", classic orchestra "The Enchantment", and the ethnic "Sacred Earth".
According to an interview he did for Lost Frontier late 2005, this gathering of styles is a consequence of the messages he is trying to convey through his music: "I don't pay as much attention to styles as to the messages I am trying to communicate."
The release of Australis' second and third albums, strengthens this feature. They comprise a wide range of styles that go from the purely electronic, to the ethnic, to the epic.

== Discography ==
=== Released works ===
- 2005 – Lifegiving
- 2008 – The Gates of Reality
- 2010 – Sentient Genus
- 2014 – Adrift
- 2019 – One of Ours

=== Contributions ===
1. Echoes of Tuvalu (Compilation, various artists – August 2006)
2. E-dition CD Sampler (Compilation, various artists – February 2007)

== See also ==
- Enigma (German band)
- List of ambient music artists
