= David Helpling =

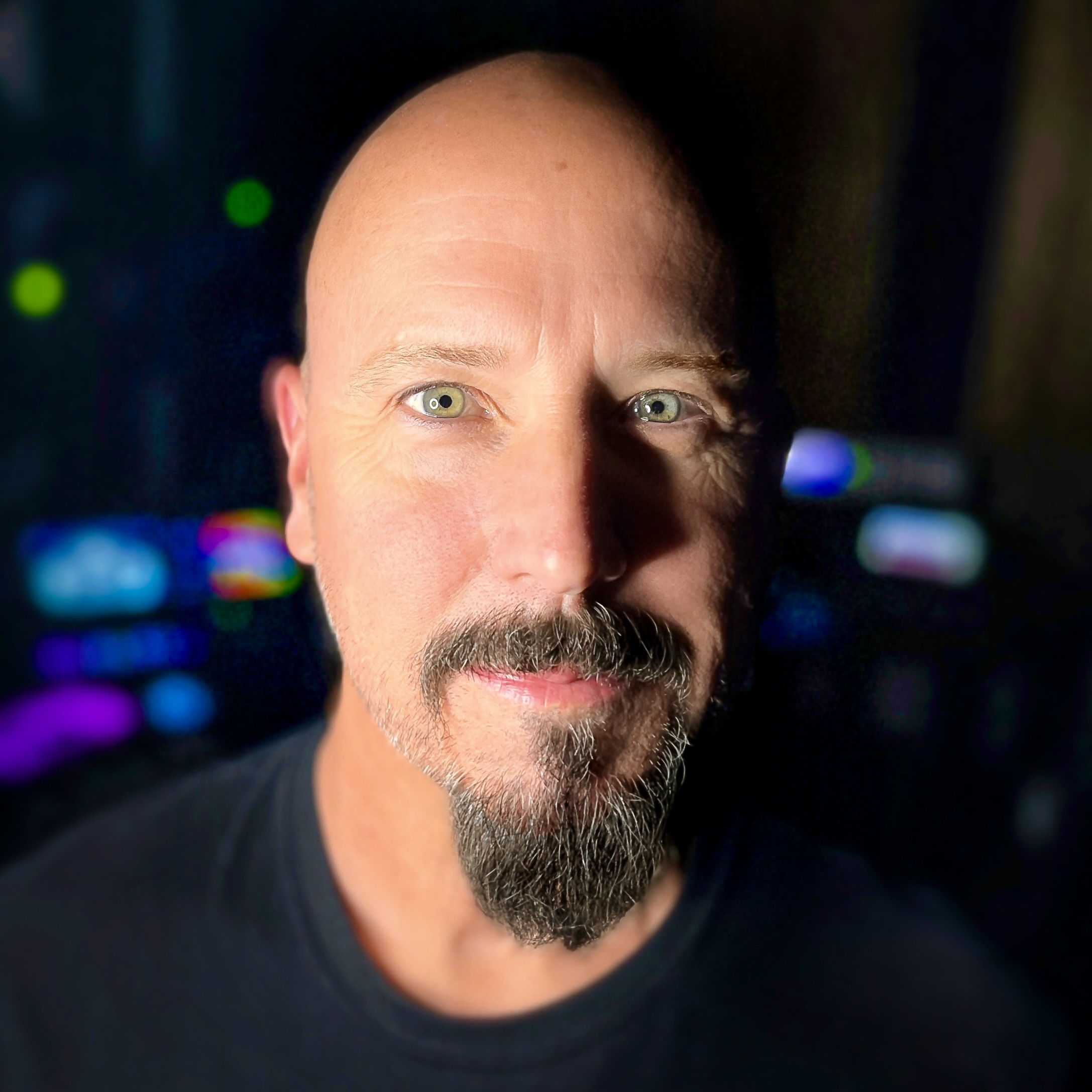

Background information
- Born: 1969 (age 56–57); Chula Vista, California, United States
- Occupations: Composer, producer
- Years active: 1997–present
- Label: Spotted Pecary
- Website: http://www.davidhelpling.com

David Helpling is a California based guitarist and keyboardist, recording artist and film composer specializing in ambient music and electronic music.

He started his solo career with Between Green and Blue and Sleeping on the Edge of the World. His later works include A Sea Without Memory (2018) and Rune (2019), both created exclusively with electric guitar, as well as IN (2022). Beyond his solo projects, Helpling has collaborated on Interdwell with Dark Sky Alliance and The Precious Dark with Eric Taylor.

== Musical career ==
Helpling is a self-taught musician, whose debut release, Between Green and Blue, was a finalist for the 1997 INDIE Album-Of-The-Year award. In 1999, Helpling released his second album, Sleeping on the Edge of the World. Among other musical influences such as U2 and Björk, one of Helpling's main inspirations is film music. Thomas Newman, Mark Isham and Elliot Goldenthal are among his favorites. As a composer for visual media, Helpling has written music for several films, one of which, Trade Offs, immersed him in the music of India. The score features several guest artists, including vocalist Nidhi Bhatmuley, who also performs on his 2022 album, IN. Other film assignments include Cold Storage (2009), directed by Tony Elwood, for which Helpling scored a fully orchestral soundtrack using mainly virtual instruments.

In 2024, David Helpling formed Dark Sky Alliance with drummer Jerry Marotta (Peter Gabriel) and synthesists Rupert Greenall (The Fixx) and Eric Taylor. Their debut album release Interdwell, released in April 2024, was met with significant success. The following year, in April 2025, Helpling released The Precious Dark with Eric Taylor, which held the No. 1 position on college radio for eight consecutive weeks.

== Collaboration ==
Helpling and Jon Jenkins initially became a working partnership after being contacted by filmmaker Chris Cumming via Helpling's record company Spotted Peccary. After working on the score to Cumming's film "False Summit" the pair discovered they had a mutual respect for and interest in each other's music. Starting with Treasure the two worked as true collaborators; both contributing equally to composing, arranging the tracks and engineering the recordings. This collaboration continued as the two embarked on completing two follow-up albums, The Crossing and Found winning the 2013 ZMR Music Award for Best Electronic Album;, the three albums constituting a sonic trilogy. He continued his collaboration with Indian musicians on the album IN (2022), which involves vocalist Nidhi Bhatmuley and esraj player Benjy Wertheimer. Loop cellist Matthew Schoening also features on the album.

David Helpling

== Film composition ==
Helpling is also a composer for film, and has also provided several themes, scores, and ambient beds for numerous television, corporate, and interactive projects. His production company is named DHM Music Design.

== Other projects ==
"As the World Falls Away" is a time-lapse video filmed and produced by Shawn Malone and set to Helpling's music. According to WILX, it "went viral" in 2014.

The video "North Country Dreamland", shot and produced by Malone, was set to "Lifted" from the album The Crossing. The video "Radiance", shot and produced by Malone, was set to Helping's music.

The animated video "You Already Are", produced by Joe Abreu, was set to the track of the same name from the album IN.

In 2023, Helpling collaborated with the Synthwave band Heartracer on the single Living Like a Ghost, an ambient-synthwave fusion exploring themes of loss and solitude. The track features vocals by Kylee Swenson Gordon and was produced and mixed by Helpling at his Deep Exile studio in San Diego.

== Discography ==
year	title	label	
1996	Between Green and Blue	Spotted Peccary	
1999	Sleeping On The Edge Of The World	Spotted Peccary	
2003	Trade Offs	Deep Exile	
2006	Cold Storage	Deep Exile	
2007	Treasure	Spotted Peccary	with Jon Jenkins
2009	Beyond Words	Deep Exile	with Jon Jenkins
2010	The Crossing	Spotted Peccary	with Jon Jenkins
2013	Found	Spotted Peccary	with Jon Jenkins
2017	A Sea Without Memory	Spotted Peccary	
2019	RUNE	Spotted Peccary	
2022	IN	Spotted Peccary	
2024	Interdwell	Spotted Peccary	with Dark Sky Alliance
2025	The Precious Dark	Spotted Peccary	with Eric Taylor

Compilations

year	title	label
1997	Stormchaser	Spotted Peccary
1997	Where The Sky Meets The Sea	Echodiscs
2007	The Knowing	Cue Records

== See also ==
- List of ambient music artists
