= Otto Placht =

Czech painter

Otto Placht (born 1962) is a Czech artist based in Peru.
