= Sentient Genus =

Studio album by Australis
- Released: November 30, 2010
- Recorded: Utah, United States
- Genre: New-age, ambient
- Length: 67:40
- Label: Essential Noises
- Producer: Australis

Sentient Genus (2010) is the third music album by Australis.

== History ==
Sentient Genus was produced and recorded in Utah, United States, and was released by Australis through the label Essential Noises on November 30, 2010.

The album took almost one and a half years to produce. It comprises twelve original music tracks.

== Overview ==
Like its predecessors, Sentient Genus compiles a wide variety of musical styles throughout its twelve tracks, including electronic music, symphonic, ambient music, world music, and ethnic music.

For the production of the album's last track, "Little Blue Planet", Australis collaborated with Sofia Luna, who performed two short vocal speeches.

Following the signature already observed in his previous two releases, Sentient Genus presents an eclectic collection of several music genres, creating an always changing experience as the listener is taken from one acoustic context to another completely different when a track ends and another beings.

According to Australis, Sentient Genus explores the human species from several different angles, presenting us with a window to our emotions, our intentions and our nature.

== Track listing ==
1. "Fatum fugit" - 5:45
2. "Passage" - 5:08
3. "Vanishing point" - 4:58
4. "Smile of a woman" - 5:41
5. "Somewhen" - 6:07
6. "Outposts of certainty" - 6:12
7. "Man must explore" - 5:21
8. "Sentient" - 4:29
9. "Windborne touch" - 5:42
10. "Human nature" - 8:05
11. "The lunatic - part one" - 4:25
12. "Little blue planet" - 5:47

== Personnel ==
- Australis (Oscar Aguayo) - composer, record producer
- Sofia Luna - collaborator, vocalist in "Little blue planet"
