= Puff Dragon =

Puff Dragon is a downtempo and ambient music project by Steve Good. Originally from Wales, Steve moved to Japan in 1995, where he currently lives. Steve's other projects include Double Dragon (psychedelic progressive trance music), as well as two full-length albums: Continuum on London's Phantasm Records (2000), Transparent on Hamburg's Plusquam Records (2002,) and many compilation tracks on trance labels such as Iboga, Spiral Trax International, and Flow. The Double Dragon sound was well received by the global trance party scene, and Steve has played live and DJ sets on five continents.

Around 2003, with a conscious effort to slow things down, Good created Puff Dragon. The idea was to create relaxing music for comfortable environments - fusing fat beats with dusty, loungy atmospheres, and natural tribal and ethnic textures.

The first full-length Puff Dragon album - "Sazanami" - was released on Dakini Records in November 2005.
