= Ray Buttigieg =

- Born: May 1, 1955 (age 71); Gozo, Malta
- Origin: New York City, United States
- Genres: Rock
- Occupations: Poet, musician
- Instrument: Guitar
- Website: raybuttigieg.com

Ray Buttigieg (born May 1, 1955) is a poet and musician.

He attended Qala primary school, then the Lyceum in Victoria, Gozo. He then moved to the United States and continued his studies in New York, where he settled permanently. By the age of 20 he had several poems published in anthologies in London and New York City.

== History ==
=== Writing ===
Buttigieg is best known for Pastorale (1978), Poeticus I & II (1986) and (1992), and the first book he wrote in his late teens, Wizard's Spider Mystic Glider, (1989) which are written in a classical style; he received criticism when he later introduced a more modern style in his experiments and improvisational poetry. In the last few years he returned to his earlier style in works like The Wisdom of Stones (2002), Remnants from the Book of Time (2002), and The Procession (1999). Although for the last 25 years Buttigieg has been writing only in English and very little in his native Maltese, his subject matter still includes a great deal of influence from his native Malta.

=== Music ===
At the age of ten Buttigieg became interested in music when he started to sing Latin hymns on the gallery of the grand pipe organ at St Joseph's church. He was also attracted to pieces of metal of various sizes, weights and alloys as well as short wave radios; he thought the combination of these found instruments are uniquely musical that could be used as effects. He later learned the guitar and started to write songs for his first rock improvisational band.

=== With Cykx ===
Buttigieg started his professional musical career in New York and Philadelphia where he fronted the six piece glam/rock band Cykx. His catchy tunes mixed with his lyrical poetry produced two top ten pop hits in the mid-seventies. At the same time synthesizers and computers and electronic music experiments on tape were becoming more interesting to Buttigieg than bandmates who could never agree on anything. Soon the band was defunct and a new project band started: Ray Buttigieg/Cykx, Cykx being the computer that replaced the members of the band. The pop or rock compositions now became explorations and experiments in sound. Compucircuit 0.008 m/s (1981) and Mechanism of Thought (1984) were both groundbreaking albums.

Buttigieg believed that electronic synthesisers were a third "high" in music, the first and second being acoustic and electric instruments.

=== Solo work ===
Buttigieg embarked on a solo career when he set eyes on his first keyboard, a Mellotron. He was involved in multiple projects at the same time while being involved in solo major works and other series concepts like Earth noise and Sound Science Series in the 70s and The Symphonic Poems, Music for and Diary of an Earthling series in the 80s. Film and video work were also becoming an interesting avenue to combine visuals and poetry, and as the music soundtrack that would define the visuals all done under the same roof. He continued his career by producing some influential and lush albums like Sound of Transformation – Symphonic Poem No.1 (1982), Quantum Mechanics (1985), Music for Movies (1986), Codes (1987) and Musical Instincts of Nature.

== Producing records and collaborating ==
Since the very beginning of his career in the mid-70s, Buttigieg has been sought after for creative guidance, collaborating, producing and as the idea man. His string of credits include in Rebellion, Process and After Thought in the 80s, and in the 90s co-wrote songs and produced bands like Novi Mystici, Prosper Falls, Selfish like Magnets and Noise Button. In the last few years of the new millennium Buttigieg wrote songs for other artists in the genres of popular music/pop song, gothic format and has gone aggressively into everything electronic whether it is electronica, ambient, new age or electronic, producing and collaborating with bands like FTSG, Dyr3, System 6, Desire becomes Being and Circa 2000 AD for Cykxincorp and Standing Stone Recording Company record labels, part of Cykxincorp Group of Companies.

== Discography ==
=== Studio albums ===
- (1982) Sound of Transformation – Symphonic Poem No.1
- (1982) Muvumenti Globali
- (1982) The Essential Transition – Symphonic Poem No.2
- (1983) Etere (Ether)
- (1984) Architecture, Agriculture & Astronomy
- (1984) Nearing the Millennium – Symphonic Poem No.3
- (1985) Quantum Mechanics
- (1985) Music for Computers
- (1986) Music for Movies
- (1986) Music for Videos
- (1987) Codes (Diary of an Earthling)
- (1987) Perpetual Energies
- (1987) Sequence – Symphonic Poem No.4
- (1988) Messages
- (1989) Spirit of the Soul – Symphonic Poem No.5
- (1989) Etenoha (Mother Earth) Earthnoise No.1
- (1990) In Dream Passages
- (1991) Almost Pure Vision – Symphonic Poem No.6
- (1992) Elements
- (1993) Musical Instincts of Nature
- (1993) Deus Meus, What are they doing? – Symphonic Poem No.7
- (1995) Ir-Rahal (The Village) Earthnoise No.2
- (1995) Procyon [aCMi] – Symphonic Poem No.8
- (1996) Methuselah Chamber
- (1998) Spheric
- (1999) Roswell 1947, Alien Debris – Symphonic Poem No.9

=== Collection albums ===
- (1988) Excerpts & Movements 1978–1988 Selected Works Vol.1
- (1990) Musics III Sound Science Series
- (1991) Time Temples
- (1998) Themes & Suites 1988–1998 Selected Works Vol.2
- (2000) Ars Electronica
- (2000) Memory Bouquet [Complete Collection One]
- (2001) Opera'tion Trilogy
- (2003) Magical Worlds
- (2005) Mysteries of Life

=== Collaboration albums ===
- (1979) Thru Energy (we Connect) (with the Cykx computer)
- (1981) Compucircuit 0.008 m/s (with the Cykx computer)
- (1984) Mechanism of Thought (with the Cykx computer)
- (1988) Symbols (with in Rebellion)
- (1988) Origins (with in Rebellion)
- (1989) Numbers (with in Rebellion)
- (1989) Rituals (with in Rebellion)
- (1995) Apocryphon (with Novi Mystici)
- (2003) From the Secret Garden (with FTSG)
- (2004) The Melancholy of Mozart (with Noise Button)

=== Compilations albums ===
- (2002) Gossamer & Lace
- (2003) Prophesied by Clouds

=== Soundtrack albums ===
- (1981) Signals
- (1985) Down on Earth
- (1985) Moving Images
- (2005) Electropolis

== Bibliography ==
=== Poetry in English ===
- Pastorale (1978)
- Windrhythm (1983)
- Apocraphasis (1984)
- Poeticus I (1986)
- Wizard's Spider Mystic Glider (1989)
- Stellae Incognita (1990)
- Poeticus II (1992)
- A Cage full of Words (1994)
- Songs of the Earth (1997)
- Objects & Orbitals (1999)
- The Procession and Other Works (1999)
- Remnants form the Book of Time (2000)
- The Wisdom of Stones and Other Selected Poems (2002)
- Calypso & Odysseus and Other Songs of the Sea (2003)

=== Poetry in Maltese ===
- Rubáiyát is-Cykx (1979)
- Pellegrinaġġ tas-Santwarju tal-Qalb (1979)

=== Symphonic Poems ===
- Sound of Transformation – Symphonic Poem No.1 (1982)
- The Essential Transition – Symphonic Poem No.2 (1982)
- Nearing the Millennium – Symphonic Poem No.3 (1984)
- Sequence – Symphonic Poem No.4 (1987)
- Spirit of the Soul – Symphonic Poem No.5 (1989)
- Almost Pure Vision – Symphonic Poem No.6 (1991)
- Deus Meus, What are they doing? – Symphonic Poem No.7 (1993)
- Procyon [aCMi] – Symphonic Poem No.8 (1995)
- Roswell 1947, Alien Debris – Symphonic Poem No.9 (1999)

== See also ==
- List of ambient music artists
