= Amethystium =

Norwegian ambient music project

- Origin: Trondheim, Norway
- Genres: Ambient; electronica; new age
- Years active: 1999–present
- Labels: Neurodisc Records
- Members: Øystein Ramfjord
- Website: amethystium.com

Amethystium is an ambient/electronica/new age music project created by Norwegian producer, composer, and multi-instrumentalist Øystein Ramfjord. Under the Amethystium name, Ramfjord has released five full-length albums, two EPs, and two compilations, all through Neurodisc Records.

== Discography ==
Studio albums

- Odonata (2001)
- Aphelion (2003)
- Evermind (2004)
- Isabliss (2008)
- Transience (2014)
- Odonata – 20th Anniversary Edition (2020)

EPs

- Autumn Interlude (2000)
- Aurorae (2012)

Compilations

- Emblem (Selected Pieces) (2006)
- Amethystium (2009)

Singles

- "Night Sea Journey" (2022)

== See also ==
- List of ambient music artists
