= Ombient =

- Mike Hunter of Ombient holding a Warr Guitar

Background information
- Origin: New Jersey, United States
- Genres: Ambient, new age
- Years active: 2000 - present
- Members: Mike Hunter
- Website: www.ombient.com

Ombient is the moniker under which Mike Hunter performs his completely improvised ambient/drone music.

Ombient's ambient/drone music, being of a live and improvisational nature, is representative of the feeling of the moment in which it is performed and of the subtle feedback between the audience and the cool performer. It features amplified guitar which is processed and layered using digital looping equipment enabling a single guitar to produce symphonic levels of density. Ombient has in the last 3 years delved deeply into the world of analog synthesis and more recently analog modular synthesis.

Mike Hunter also plays in the progressive/world/ambient/space rock band known as Brainstatik, of which Mike Hunter is a member.

Mike Hunter is also a Fractal artist.

Mike Hunter also hosts the long time running FM radio program "Music With Space" on WPRB 103.3 FM, in Princeton.
