= Tom Heasley =

American musician

Tom Heasley is an American musician, known for his ambient tuba work. Heasley also performs on didjeridu, voice, and electronics.

Where the Earth Meets the Sky, his first album, was released on the Hypnos Recordings ambient label and was mastered by ambient music pioneer Robert Rich. In his 4-star review for AllMusic, Matt Borghi called it "a thoughtful and sonically rich recording." Exclaim! wrote that "the music is suggestive of an eerie, vast, iridescent lunar landscape caught in perpetual twilight, with the singing perhaps adding an extraterrestrial dimension to it."

== Discography ==
Solo Recordings (Produced by Tom Heasley):

- Where the Earth Meets the Sky (2001 - Hypnos; solo tuba and electronics, real-time improvisations in studio)
- On The Sensations of Tone (2002 - Innova; solo tuba and electronics; live performance in radio station ("Thonis") plus one track ("Prelude") from 'Where the Earth Meets the Sky' sessions)
- Desert Triptych (2005 - Farfield; solo didjeridu, voice & electronics, recorded live in NYC)

Collaborations (Produced by Tom Heasley):

- Passages (2007 - Full Bleed Music; Duo real-time studio improvisations with Toss Panos, drums)
- "Varistar" (2009 - Full Bleed Music; Trio improvisations in studio with Bobby Bradford, cornet and Ken Rosser, guitar)
- "Echoes Of Syros" (2009 - Full Bleed Music; Trio improvisations recorded in performance (Oakland, CA) with Stuart Dempster, trombone and Erik Glick Rieman, rhodes piano)

== See also ==
- List of ambient music artists
