= The Ultraviolet Catastrophe =

Studio album by Trotsky Icepick
- Released: 1991
- Length: 43:50
- Label: SST

Trotsky Icepick chronology
El Kabong (1989)	The Ultraviolet Catastrophe (1991)	Carpetbomb the Riff (1993)

Professional ratings
Review scores
Source	Rating
AllMusic	3/5 stars
The Village Voice	(choice cut)

The Ultraviolet Catastrophe is an album by the American band Trotsky Icepick, released in 1991 on SST Records. It featured seven new musicians the band hired in addition to their core quintet.

== Track listing ==
1. The Ultra Violet Catastrophe
2. Alphaville
3. The Thing Under the Couch
4. WDBS
5. Barbara Steele
6. Boy w/ Book
7. God Without a Compass
8. Venus de Milo
9. Pestilence
10. August August
11. Martian Manhunter
12. Q.E.D.
