= Lifegiving =

Studio album by Australis
- Released: May 30, 2005
- Recorded: Utah, United States
- Genre: New-age, ambient
- Length: 44:55
- Label: Independent Records
- Producer: Australis

Professional ratings
Review scores
Source	Rating
Morpheus Music	link
Wind and Wire	link

Lifegiving (2005) is the music album debut by Australis.

== Album history ==
Lifegiving was produced and recorded in Utah, United States, and was independently released by Australis on May 30, 2005.
By early 2006 "Lifegiving" was licensed and re-released in Southern Asia by the Orange Music record label.
In August 2006 two tracks from this album were included in the New Vibes Music's compilation Echoes of Tuvalu. The tracks included were "Conciliation" and "The Sound of Hope". That same month this compilation reached the top position in the New Age charts, according to New Age Reporter.
As a result of his collaboration for "Echoes of Tuvalu", the Italian magazine "New Age Music & New Sounds" published an article about Australis in October 2006 (issue № 166), and included the same two tracks from "Lifegiving" in the corresponding compilation compact disc they release with every issue.

== Album overview ==
Lifegiving is a compilation of ten musical tracks of varied styles including Ambient music, World music, Electronic music, Ethnic music, Symphonic music and Soundtrack.

One of the main characteristics of this album is the contrasting styles between the tracks. This feature tends to create an impression of surprise in the listener as each track switches to a different style than that from the previous track, developing a whole new musical landscape. The result is a fresh, stimulating and entertaining experience.

Although one of the tracks on this album had a collaborator (Alvaro Aguayo, playing the charango in "Sacred Earth"), all the tracks were composed, arranged, produced and recorded by Australis.

== Track listing ==
1. "Lifegiving" – 4:02
2. "Conciliation" – 4:40
3. "Turning Point" – 5:28
4. "The Sound of Hope" – 4:45
5. "Fire Tamer" – 3:49
6. "Forbidden Scents" – 4:49
7. "The Enchantment" – 3:33
8. "Between the Sun and the Moon" – 4:51
9. "Barren Lands" – 4:33
10. "Sacred Earth" – 4:25

== Tracks overview ==
- "Lifegiving", the title track, initiates the album with the nocturnal sounds of the forest while a somewhat mysterious melody builds slowly. Soon a piano intervenes together with a soft arpeggio as the piece heads towards its climax. After a second instrumental verse based on piano and violin, the intensity is built one last time to reach its culmination as the piece ends fading into the sounds of the night.
- The second track, "Conciliation", uses more electronic instruments. It starts with a rhythmic electronic pad and a delicate piano a little bit later. Slow tempo percussion enters the instrumentation as the music develops into spacious (although slightly dark) sequences that eventually lead to the build into the main refrain. In contrast with the instrumental verses, the also instrumental chorus brings light to the melodies and the rhythm.
- "Turning Point" starts with a very intense orchestral sequence that evokes epic film scenes. That short sequence gives way to a very quiet segment with long pads and heavy-hearted chords. Later a dramatic melody builds over that foundation as an ethnic rhythm introduces a heartfelt violin. There are brief segments of light and more hopeful melodies towards the middle of the piece. However, as the track approaches its end, it sets in a sequence tinted by sadness and determination.
- "The Sound of Hope" is by contrast a piece marked by a much more luminous atmosphere. It begins with a soft piano melody over electronic pads. The piano is soon accompanied by a flute and a noninvasive rhythm as the piece develops towards its climax. The refrain combines the same elements (pad, rhythm, piano and flute) with the addition of vocal pads, to create a decisively positive climax. A moment of quiet indecision interrupts the piece only to allow its refrain to resume with the same positive taste as the piece reaches its end.
- "Fire Tamer" is the first purely electronic track of the album. Its intense rhythmic background starts almost from the beginning and is soon complemented by a wide range of other instruments among which are piano, arpeggio, synthetic leads and a wide assortment of other electronic sounds. The piece gallops with an almost uniform intensity from the start to its unexpected ending creating a dynamic and playful mood.
- "Forbidden Scents" begins with soft sweeps giving way to a seductive rhythm where the now characteristic long reverbed piano draws an introductory melody. This track has a distinctive exotic flavor. Its suggestive and long melodic sequences built with piano, bells, and even ethnic winds, create an atmosphere of "anxious relax" connecting the listener with her/his own senses as the piece reaches its climax in the last 85 seconds.
- "The Enchantment" is an orchestral movement that begins with a harp and strings. In a waltz tempo, the piece soon unravels its whimsical nature inviting other instruments like oboe and a very light percussion based on timpani and tambourine. But then the fanciful mood is suddenly interrupted when the intense refrain arrives with winds and a much stronger percussion creating a sense of danger. The magic returns later when the calm of the first verses is resumed; but then, like an unavoidable reality, the refrain develops again, ending the movement in a dramatic combination of intensity and dark tranquility.
- "Between the Sun and the Moon" can be perceived as a fusion of electronic music and smooth contemporary jazz. It begins with a sequence of pad and cello and later a verse of electronic percussion and piano. A synthesized flute is used for the bridge and for the second verse an acoustic guitar accompanies the piano. The refrain is built over pads, synthesized arpeggios, a fully electronic lead and later some bell accents. This piece has a more "modern" structure (verse, bridge, refrain, etc.) and has a more "pop" feeling to it.
- "Barren Lands" evokes some of the epic images from "Turning Point". It begins with the sound of desolated winds as the piano introduces a dramatic yet simple introduction. Another dramatic segment formed by strings, piano and bass ensues, and eventually gives way to yet another dark sequence by piano and a soft pad in the background as the wind blows again. It is only then that the piece is finally unchained reaching an engaging and suggestive - although still dramatic - refrain with a middle-eastern percussion and electronic keyboards.
- In "Sacred Earth" Australis explores yet another style. This piece has a clear ethnic flavor that brings images of native southern cultures. With wooden flutes and wooden percussion, together with some synthesized pads; the track builds with intensity to create a scenario where dance and hope blend seamlessly. Alvaro Aguayo plays the charango a couple of times in this track: in a bridge between the first and second verses, and at the end as the rhythm is fading away.

== Personnel ==
- Australis (Oscar Aguayo) - composer, record producer
- Alvaro Aguayo - collaborator, charango player in "Sacred Earth"
