= Daniel Patrick Quinn =

Musical artist and mountain writer (born 1981)

- Genres: Experimental music Folk music Drone music Art rock Ambient music
- Instruments: Vocals, guitar, keyboards, violin, percussion
- Years active: 2003–present
- Labels: Suilven Recordings; Wee Black Skelf
- Member of: One More Grain Kurt Doles
- Website: www.gunung.org

Daniel Patrick Quinn is a British musician, composer, producer and cataloguer of mountains. Quinn is a member of the group One More Grain.

== Career ==
After living in Indonesia, Quinn moved back to the UK and settled in Stornoway. His EP, I, Sun, was released via Bandcamp in April 2016.

A compilation of unreleased material was released in 2021 with the title Swirling In The Backyard.

== Ribus ==
While living in Indonesia in 2009, Quinn and Andrew Dean created a list of all the mountains in Indonesia with a topographic prominence of over 1,000 metres. They named these "ribus", from the Indonesian word for "thousand".

== Selected publications ==
- Quinn, Daniel Patrick (13 January 2025). "Climbing the Ribus - The World's Peaks of 1000m Prominence". UK Hillwalking.
- Quinn, Daniel Patrick (2024). The Relative Mountains of Earth: The Ribus. Pedanticus Press. ISBN 978-1-9163662-3-7.
