= One More Grain =

British rock band

- Origin: London, England, UK
- Genres: Alternative rock Experimental music Spoken word Drone music Fusion (music); Modal jazz
- Years active: 2006–2008, 2014-present
- Labels: Victory Garden; White Heat Records
- Members: Daniel Patrick Quinn; Andrew Blick; Merek Cooper; Robin Blick
- Past members: Dudu Froment; Gal Moore; Laurie Waller

One More Grain is an experimental British rock band. The band is fronted by singer and multi-instrumentalist Daniel Patrick Quinn.

== History ==
Quinn lived in Scotland for around three years, culminating in the release of the record Ridin' the Stang, which was subsequently toured with a group of local musicians called The Rough Ensemble. Stewart Lee featured Quinn's track "The Burryman" on his Topography of Chance CD.

The band's second album, Isle of Grain, was released on White Heat Records on 28 January 2008 and was gigged around the country at that time. The album predominantly featured the new line-up of the band, but with some tracks from earlier sessions featuring Froment and Moore. Andrew Blick's father Robin Blick also guested on clarinet and tenor saxophone. In a pre-release review in Plan B, a reviewer questioned whether the band were "actually some elaborate practical joke". The album was named "Album of the Week" by The Sunday Times and received airplay on BBC Radio 1.

The band went on hiatus in mid-2008, and Quinn taught English in Southeast Asia. A posthumous 7" single featuring a One More Grain version of the traditional English song "Scarborough Fair" was released via Static Caravan in 2008.

All the members of One More Grain also participated in Andrew Blick's parallel project Gyratory System, which continued following the breakup of One More Grain.

In May 2014, it was announced that Quinn had moved to the Outer Hebrides and had resumed work with Blick on a third One More Grain album entitled Grain Fever.

A compilation of rare and unreleased material was released in 2021, and a fourth One More Grain studio album titled Beans On Toast With Pythagoras was released in 2022 via Bandcamp, in addition to an Indonesian gamelan interpretation of previous One More Grain pieces.

In 2023, the band released One More Grain, followed by Modern Music.

== Group members ==
- Daniel Patrick Quinn - vocals, Juno synthesizer, guitar, violin, harmonica, oud, wine glasses, gas canisters, maracas, production
- Andrew Blick - trumpet (and trumpet mouthpiece), programming, sound treatments, laptop computer, garagak, tbilet
- Robin Blick - brass and woodwind (2021-present)
- Merek Cooper - guitars, percussion, synths, vocals (2007-2008, 2021-present)

== Previous group members ==
- Dudu Froment - double bass, fretless bass guitar (2006-2007)
- Gal Moore - drums (2006-2007)
- Laurie Waller - drums and percussion (2007-2008)

== Additional or temporary live musicians ==
- Kev Campbell - guitar and synth (live performances 2007-2008)
- Stuart Humpage - guitar (live performances 2007)
- Stephen Collins - drums (live session 2007)
- Darryl Woollaston - guitar (live performance 2007)
- James Weaver - guitar (live performance 2008)

== Discography ==
=== Albums ===
- Pigeon English (Victory Garden) 2007
- Isle of Grain (White Heat) 2008
- Grain Fever (self-released) 2015
- Grain Gamelan (self-released gamelan versions performed by Iwan Gunawan and his ensemble) 2022
- Beans On Toast With Pythagoras (self-released) 2022
- One More Grain (self-released) 2023
- One More Grain (self-released) 2023

=== Compilations ===
- Everything Becomes Normal (self-released) 2014
- Swirling In The Backyard volume 2 / Sulawesi (self-released) 2021
- Swirling In The Backyard volume 3 / Boroughbridge (self-released) 2022

=== Singles ===
- "Live in Brighton" (Victory Garden / Static Caravan, 3" cd) 2007
- "Having A Ball" (White Heat, 7" single) 2008
- "Scarborough Fair" b/w "Giriama Wedding" (Static Caravan, 7" single) 2008
