= Brunette Models =

- Birth name: Piotr Krzyżanowski
- Also known as: Peter Krzyzanowski, Ερημίτης Κατώτερος (Eremites Katoteros)
- Born: 1974 (age 50–51)
- Origin: Toruń, Poland
- Genres: Ambient, Experimental music, Atmospheric Music, Electroacoustic music, Deep Listening, Hesychasm
- Years active: 1991 – present
- Labels: Anadyomene' Secret Rec., Generator Rec.
- Website: Anadyomene' Secret Rec.

Brunette Models is a Polish-Cypriot musical project for experimental electronic music and sound sculpture, in the style of ambient music, atmospheric, hesychasm, deep listening music, and is one of a pioneer of this kind of music in Poland, although outside the media and without publicity.

== Piotr Krzyżanowski ==
Brunette Models is the alter ego of the artist Piotr Krzyzanowski, who was born (1974) and grew up in Toruń (Poland). He graduated from the Faculty of Philosophy (Nicolaus Copernicus University in Toruń). He was involved in projects for the Warsaw Electronic Festival (WEF) and Contemporary Electronic Soundscapes (CES). He also was a journalist of the „Estrada i Studio” magazine. Krzyzanowski is active in music production (Agnes de Venice, Xenia Agapene) and the implementation of sound, too. He performed live at the International Ambient Festival in Gorlice, 15 July 2004 and many more. The music of Brunette Models has been played by radio stations. In August 2009 a video-clip by Polish multimedia-artist Joanna Cholascinska was released with a track from the „Apsychastenia” album. Krzyzanowski designed and constructed hardware and software for high-resolution recording (Digital eXtreme Definition) on a 24-bit/352.8 kHz workstation. Krzyzanowski founded the Cypriot label Anadyomene' Secret Records. After 10 years this site was closed by a massive hacker attack. From 2018 April, the web-portal has been made fully working again. An announcement was made in the spring of 2025:

We have been online with you for 26 years (previously at a different address). Everything is changing, the world is changing. Internet service prices have risen by more than 500%(!). I am one person, completely independent. I have never earned a cent from the music. This music has always been made available FOR FREE. Thank you very much for your interest & thanks for all downloads. This host will be online until 10 June 2025. See you in a better world. Lov–ya.

== Πρόβατοφωνή ==
Since 2018, Brunette Models as Ερημίτης Κατώτερος (Eremites Katoteros) alias, creates with Xenia Agapene a musical duet named Πρόβατοφωνή (Provatofoni).

== Musical development ==
A characteristic of Brunette Models music is that it homes in on the dominant tone color, as a fundamental aesthetic value, which is a trait of synesthetes. For the past few years he has not officially published pressed albums. He withdrew from the world and focused on music only, without promotion, A&R, PR and without even connection to the internet. In his artistic manifesto he motivated this asceticism, that today's world looks more at the name of the composer, than at the music. BM thinks it is not a good. In music he sees mysticism as a possible prayer to God, a kind of hesychasm.

== Discography ==
=== As Brunette Models ===
- 1995 - 97 – Magnus luctus in ergastulo – The first album.
- 1999 – Apsychastenia – The second album.
- 2000 – Impressions of whispers – The third album.
- 2002 – Apsychastenia 2.
- 2002 – Historia jednej chwili (History of one moment) – ANR0017.
- 2002 – City Songs 7 – compilation.
- 2004 – 6th International Music Presentations of Ambient 2004, 15 July, P5:00, presenter: Jerzy Kordowicz.
- 2008 – Last poem – The fifth album – GEN CD 007.
- 2010 – Αυτάρκεια (Autarky) [single – Studio Master 24-bit/96 kHz technology].
- 2011 – Ατλαντίδα (Atlantis) [single – Studio Master 24-bit/96 kHz technology].
- 2012 – Παρουσία (Parousia) [single – Studio Master 24-bit/96 kHz technology].
- 2014 – Aναστενάζοντας στον Θεό [maxi-single – Studio Master 24-bit/96 kHz technology].
- since 2019 – Πρόβατοφωνή (Provatofoni) etc.

=== As Eremites Katoteros nick ===
- 2021 – Album from May 5, which has non–writable secret titles. See inlay for details.

== See also ==
- List of ambient music artists

== Sources ==
- Polscy producenci muzyczni (Polish music producers), PL edition [paperback], Publication Date: 3 September 2011, ISBN 1-231-84654-2, ISBN 978-1-231-84654-4.
- Kalejdoskop polskich twórców (Kaleidoscope of Polish artists), „Astral Voyager” Magazyn Muzyki Elektronicznej (Electronic Music Magazine), 2001, No. 1.
- Czym jest dla mnie muzyka, czyli co ma Chopin do ambientu, „Astral Voyager” Magazyn Muzyki Elektronicznej (Electronic Music Magazine), 2001, No. 2.
- El-Skwarka, Impresje Szeptów (Impressions of whispers), „Estrada i Studio”, No. 5, 2001, ISSN 1427-0404, p. 96.
- AUDIOPHILE Sound Numero Speciale Top Audio 2011 p. 6.
