= Sufi Ruhaniat International =

Stream of Universal Sufism

The Sufi Ruhaniat International (SRI) is a stream of Universal Sufism and draws inspiration from traditions of Sufism within and beyond historic Islam. SRI is an initiatic order within the lineage of Inayat Khan (Inayati-Chishtiyya). Sufi Ahmed Murad Chisti (Samuel L. Lewis), a disciple of Inayat Khan, formally founded the order in 1970. There are centers throughout the United States, Belgium, Canada, the Netherlands and the United Kingdom.

== History ==
Inayat Khan, founder of Universal Sufism

Universal Sufism was established in the early 20th century. Two forms made up early Universal Sufism: the Sufi Order, which Inayat Khan separated from Islam and brought to the West, and westerners of the more traditional Shadhili Order. Both held the principle of universalism, according to which Sufism can be valid for anyone, regardless of their background.

Inayat Khan originally belonged to the Chishti Order, but founded the Sufi Order between 1915 and 1917 as an independent universalist take on Sufism. After his death in 1927, the Sufi Order split over Khan's succession. Leadership over the Order ultimately went to Inayat Khan's brother, Maheboob Khan.

Inayat Khan's first disciple in America, Rabia Martin, assuming from a letter from Inayat Kahn that she would have to "attend to my [Inayat Khan's] affairs in the West", found herself rejected by the community. She continued independently, and recognized Meher Baba as the Avatar of the age, eventually giving rise to Sufism Reoriented.

One of Martin's disciples was Samuel Lewis, who had also been a student of Inayat Khan. In the late 1960s, Murshid Samuel L. Lewis began initiating and training students first under the banner of Zen and then of Sufism. The Sufi Ruhaniat International was incorporated as the Sufi Islamia Ruhaniat Society by Lewis in November 1970 to help carry on his Sufi initiatic lineage in the Chishti Sufi tradition, shortly before his death in 1971. In 2002 the name was changed to Sufi Ruhaniat International.

Shortly before his passing, Lewis appointed as his successor his Khalif Moineddin Jablonski, who directed the organization from 1971 until his own passing in 2001. Jablonski was succeeded by Shabda Kahn as Pir of the lineage.

=== Dargah ===
When Samuel Lewis died, he asked that his body be buried at the interspiritual community of Lama Foundation, near Taos, New Mexico. The grave became a pilgrimage site (known as a dargah) and was rebuilt several times in the intervening years. In August 2017, work was completed on a new building surrounding the gravesite. It is designed to facilitate visits by pilgrims in the same way that Sufi dargahs in other parts of the world do.

== Beliefs ==
Inayat defined three objectives of Universal Sufism:

1. To establish a human unity with no consideration of caste, creed, race, nation, or religion. Differences produce inharmony and cause all miseries in the world.
2. To spread the wisdom of Sufis which has been until now a hidden treasure, it being the property of humankind which does not belong to a certain race or religion.
3. To attain that perfection where mysticism remains no more a mystery, which relieves the disbeliever from ignorance and the believer from falling victim to hypocrisy.

== Concentrations ==
=== Esoteric School ===
Initiation and progress on the path of discipleship is the central theme of the Sufi Ruhaniat International. The relationship between teacher and student exists for the purpose of providing training that leads to realization of the Divine essence in each human being, and to leading a life of service to God and humanity. Through various centers, classes are offered both to the general public (in accordance with the brother/sisterhood work) and to those interested in the path of initiation. Initiates are expected to maintain a relationship with a spiritual guide. Students are referred to as mureeds.

=== Dervish Healing Order ===
The Dervish Healing Order serves as that aspect of the Sufi Ruhaniat International which maintains and promotes the vision of health and Divine Healing as presented by Inayat Khan. The Dervish Healing Order is an initiatory order. All members have demonstrated their deep involvement in some aspect of healing, either toward self or others. A primary activity is the conduction of the Healing Service of Inayat Khan.

=== Ziraat ===
Ziraat is a heart-based approach to gardening and food production outwardly, and to spiritual growth inwardly. The heart, like the earth, is regarded as sacred soil to be prepared for planting. It is said that rocks and roots are removed; last year's stubble is plowed under. Sunshine and rain attend the turning of the seasons, and the ancient cycles of sowing, growth, fruition and harvest are realized in people and in their gardens and farms.

=== Universal Worship Service ===
The Universal Worship Service was created by Inayat Khan to promote a deeper understanding and appreciation of the diverse religious traditions of the world: both in the beauty of their distinctions and differences, externally, and in the transformative and healing power of their inner Unity...all coming from the same Source. Conducted by ministers called Cherags (Lamps of the Message), the Service honors nine of world's major religious traditions – the Goddess Tradition, Hinduism, Taoism, Buddhism, Zoroastrianism, the Native Traditions of the world, Judaism, Christianity, and Islam. For each tradition, a candle is lit, a selection from the sacred scriptures is read, and a spiritual practice or Dance of Universal Peace is led. Leaders of the Universal Worship Service are referred to as cherags and cheragas.

=== Dances of Universal Peace ===
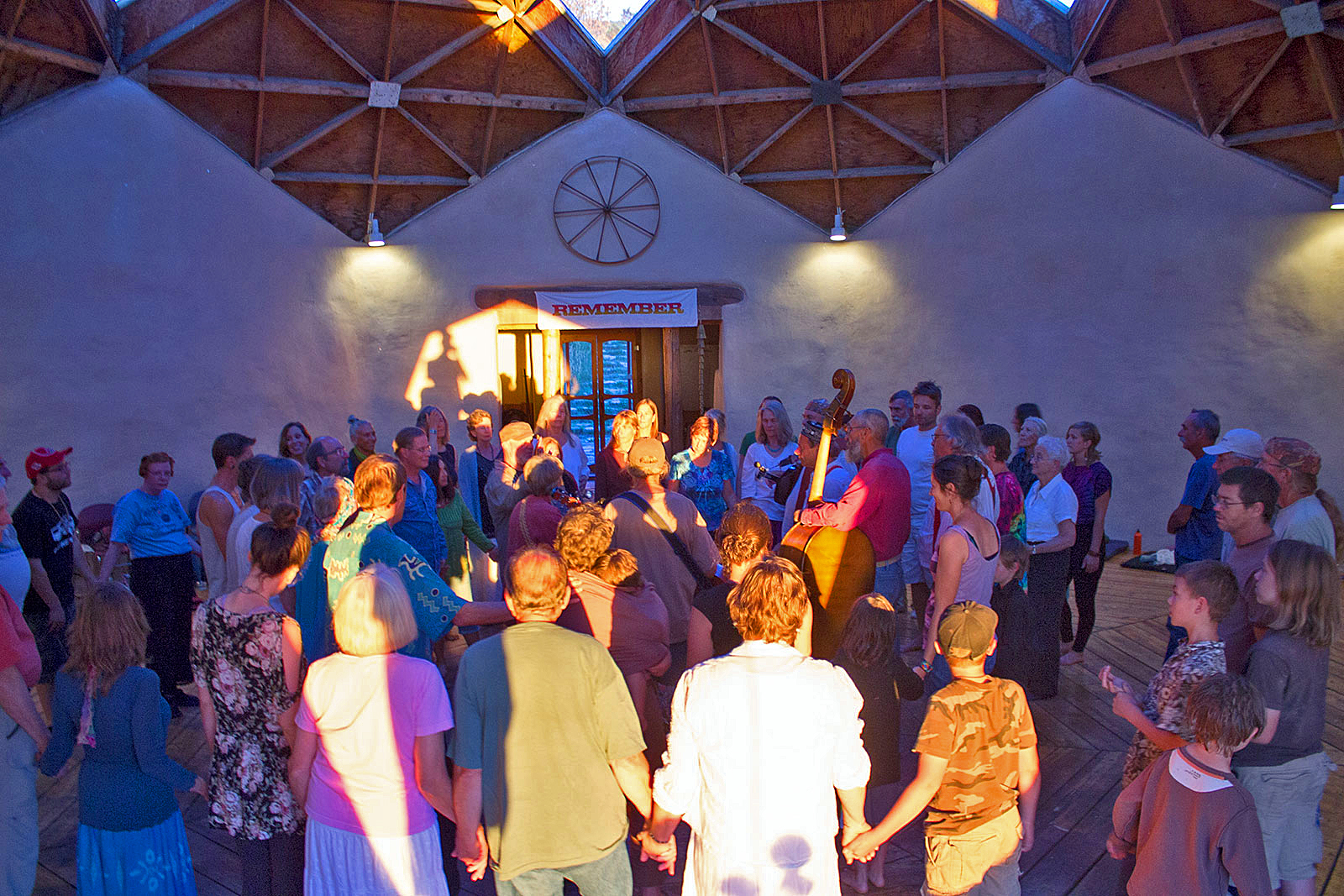
A 'Dances of Universal Peace ' session, a particular concentration of the Sufi Ruhaniat Order.

The Dances of Universal Peace are simple, meditative, joyous, multi-cultural, circle dances that use sacred phrases, chants, music, and movements from the many traditions of the earth to touch the spiritual essence within ourselves and others. Based on the work begun in the late 1960s by Murshid Samuel L. Lewis, they promote peace and integration within individuals and groups worldwide. There are no performers nor audience – new arrivals and old hands form the circle together.

Dances were originally performed at camps and meetings with a distinctly new age and alternative feel but have increasingly been offered in diverse places of worship and more secular places such as schools, colleges, prisons, hospices, residential homes for those with special needs, and holistic health centers. The therapeutic uses of the Dances as well as the walking meditations developed by Samuel Lewis have also been explored in various settings. The Dances have developed into a global movement due to the work of the International Network for the Dances of Universal Peace founded in 1982 by Neil Douglas-Klotz and Tasnim Fernandez, teachers in the Sufi Ruhaniat International and Sufi Order International respectively. Both have continued to be leading exponents of the Dances and Douglas-Klotz's creation of Dances using the Aramaic words of Jesus have entered many alternative and mainstream religious circles. The Network has members in 28 countries. Dance leader certification is available through the affiliated Mentor Teachers Guild.

== Leadership ==
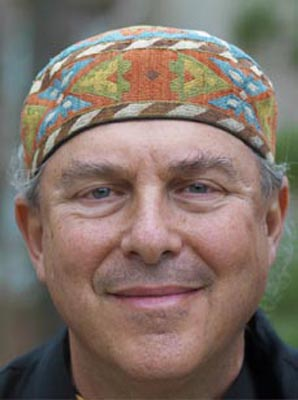
Pir Shabda Kahn

Leadership of SRI is provided by a pir (spiritual leader) and a council of murshids and murshidas (senior teachers). Teachers are referred to as sheiks and sheikhas. SRI is not "guru-centered" and maintains a minimal hierarchy required for any effective organization to function. All members are respected for the unique perspectives and abilities they offer.

Shabda Kahn received bayat (initiation) from his teacher Murshid Samuel L. Lewis, a disciple of Pir-o-Murshid Inayat Khan, in 1969. He served as his personal assistant during the fall of 1970, shortly before Murshid Sam's death. He then served as an assistant to Pir Moineddin, throughout the 1970s. At the request of Pir Moineddin, Shabda Kahn was initiated as a Sheikh in 1977 by Pir Vilayat Khan, eldest son of Inayat Khan, at the tomb of Pir-o-Murshid Inayat Khan in Delhi, on the occasion of Inayat Khan's 50th Urs . He was initiated as a Murshid in 1997 by Pir Hidayat Inayat Khan uniting all of the previously disparate Universal Sufi lineages. In 2001, at the death of Pir Moineddin Jablonski, Shabda Kahn succeeded him as Pir of the Sufi Ruhaniat International, by Pir Moineddin's appointment.

As Pir of the Sufi Ruhaniat International, Shabda directs the Jamiat Khas (the Ruhaniat leader circle), directs the SRI Board of Trustees, and is the spiritual director for the Dances of Universal Peace worldwide, as well as the director of the Chisti Sabri School of Music.

Dates Active	Pir
1970–1971	Samuel L. Lewis (1896–1971)
1971–2001	Moineddin Jablonski (1942–2001)
2001 — Current	Shabda Kahn

== Silsila ==
Every tariqa or Sufi order has a silsila, or named lineage of succession. Centuries ago, Arabia did not have schools for formal education. Students went to teachers who taught them. Upon completion of their study, they received ijazah (permission) which acted as the certification of their education. A graduate then acted as a teacher having their own students or disciples. This chain of teachers is known as silsila or lineage. Somewhat analogous to the modern situation where degrees are only accepted from recognized universities, the certification of a teacher having a verifiable chain of teachers was the only criteria which accorded legitimacy:

"Theoretically one can only receive instruction in these practices (talqîn) from an authorised teacher of the tariqa, and only after pledging a vow of obedience (bay'ah) to this shaikh. The shaikh gives his disciples permission (ijâza) to practice the tariqa: he may also authorise one or more of them to teach it to others, i.e. appoint them as his khalîfa. In this way a hierarchically ordered network of teachers may emerge. Each shaikh can show a chain of authorities for the tarekat he teaches, his silsila or spiritual genealogy. Usually the silsila reaches back from one's own teacher up to the Prophet, with whom all tarekats claim to have originated although there have been modifications along the way. A Sufi's silsila is his badge of identity and source of legitimation; it provides him with a list of illustrious predecessors and shows how he is related to other Sufis."

Although the silsilas have traditionally only been formed of men, there have been women Sufi masters, notably Rabia al-Adawiyya, and the Sufi Ruhaniat initiates men and women on an equal basis at every level of the organisation.

The Salsila of the Sufi Ruhaniat International follows the Nizami branch of the spiritual lineage of the Chishti Order:

- Nizamuddin Auliya Mahbub-i Ilahi
- Nasiruddin Chiragh Delhi
- Shaykh al-Masha’ikh Kamaluddin ‘Allama
- Shaykh al-Masha’ikh Sirajuddin
- Shaykh al-Masha’ikh ‘Ilmuddin
- Shaykh al-Masha’ikh Mahmud Rajan
- Shaykh al-Masha’ikh Jamaluddin Jamman
- Shaykh al-Masha’ikh Hasan Muhammad
- Shaykh al-Masha’ikh Muhammad Chishti
- Shaykh al-Masha’ikh Yahya Madani
- Shaykh al-Masha’ikh Shah Kalimullah Jahanabadi
- Shaykh al-Masha’ikh Nizamuddin Aurangabadi
- Shaykh al-Masha’ikh Maulana Fakhruddin Delhi
- Shaykh al-Masha’ikh Ghulam Qutbuddin
- Shaykh al-Masha’ikh Nasiruddin Mahmud Kale Miyan
- Shaykh al-Masha’ikh Muhammad Hasan Jili Kalimi
- Shaykh al-Masha’ikh Muhammed Abu Hashim Madani
- Pir-o-Murshid Inayat Khan
- Pir-o-Murshid Sufi Ahmed Murad Chisti
- Pir Moineddin Jablonski
- Pir Shabda Kahn

== "Godparents" of the order ==
Other teachers have informed the Sufi Ruhaniat International's spiritual tradition and are acknowledged as "godparents" of the movement. Among these are:

Sensei Nyogen Senzaki (1876–1958) was a Rinzai Zen monk and student of Soyen Shaku. He was the Zen teacher of Samuel L. Lewis. His last words were said to be "Remember the Dharma! Remember the Dharma! Remember the Dharma!"

Ruth St. Denis (1879–1968) was a modern dance pioneer and a major influence on Samuel L. Lewis, who called her "Mata-Ji" (Honored Mother) and referred to her as "my fairy godmother". She was a source of inspiration in Samuel L. Lewis' creation of the Dances of Universal Peace and of the Spiritual Walks.

Joe Miller (1904–1992) was an American mystic best known for his Thursday Morning Walks in San Francisco's Golden Gate Park with his wife Guin during the 1970s and 1980s. Joe was widely respected for his spiritual clarity and Walter Evans-Wentz, the original translator of the Tibetan Book of the Dead, and other sacred Mahayana texts, considered Joe Miller "the only man he had met in the West who understood the Doctrine of the Clear Light." Joe was a close friend of Samuel L. Lewis who upon his deathbed asked Joe to "Take care of my disciples." Joe provided spiritual guidance to Sam's disciples, and many others, until his death in 1992.

Swami Papa Ramdas and Mother Krishnabai – In the 1950s Murshid SAM reported a recurring vision with the face of a saint accompanied by poetry, “By one year’s time, by land or sea, I will come to thee.” In 1954, in keeping with the vision, Papa (Swami) Ramdas and Mother Krishnabai came to San Francisco on their World Tour and Murshid SAM found his “Hindu” Guru.

Sufi Barkat Ali was a Muslim Sufi who belonged to the Qadri spiritual order. He became Murshid Samuel L. Lewis' Sufi guide after the passing of Inayat Khan, and continued to advise Lewis' disciples after his own death. Ali was the founder of the non-political, non-profit, religious organisation, Dar-ul-Ehsan.
