= Samuel L. Lewis =

American mystic (1896–1971)

Lewis on the cover of a book of a series of lectures made by him in 1970

Samuel L. Lewis also known as Murshid Samuel Lewis and Sufi Ahmed Murad Chisti (October 18, 1896 – January 15, 1971) was an American mystic and horticultural scientist who founded what became the Sufi Ruhaniat International, a branch of the Chishtia Sufi lineage. After a lifetime of spiritual study with teachers East and West, primarily Inayat Khan and Nyogen Senzaki, Lewis was recognized simultaneously as a Zen master and Sufi murshid (senior teacher) by Eastern representatives of the two traditions. He also co-founded the Christian mystical order called the Holy Order of Mans. His early interest in international seed exchange and organic agriculture also established him as one of the pioneers of green spirituality. His most enduring legacy may be the creation of the Dances of Universal Peace, an early interspiritual practice that has spread around the world in the 50 years since his death.

== Life ==
Lewis was born to Jewish parents. Lewis' father Jacob Lewis was a vice president of the Levi Strauss jeans manufacturing company. His mother was Harriett Rosenthal, the daughter of Lenore Rothschild of the international banking family. Lewis showed a keen interest in religion and spirituality at an early age and, to his parents' dismay, he later rejected their encouragements to become a businessman.

In 1919 Lewis entered a Sufi community in Fairfax, California where he met Murshida Rabia Martin, a student of the Sufi teacher and musician Inayat Khan. A year later he began Zen study with Nyogen Senzaki, a disciple of the Rinzai Zen Buddhist Abbot Soyen Shaku. The practices and tenets of both Sufism and Zen continued to influence him throughout his life.

Lewis remained in the Fairfax Sufi community through the early 1920s. In 1923 a vision of Inayat Khan led Lewis into initiation by the Pir-O-Murshid. In 1926, he collaborated with Nyogen Senzaki, a Rinzai Zen Buddhist monk, in opening the first official Zen meditation hall (zendo) in San Francisco.

Lewis continued to study Sufism and Zen, as well as yoga, the latter with Swami Ramdas of Anandashram. He also developed an interest in horticulture and promoted seed exchanges internationally. Additionally, Lewis was an adherent and promoter of the General Semantics approach to psychology, language, and translation begun by Alfred Korzybski.

In 1956, he visited Japan, India, Pakistan, and Egypt, seeking the company of other mystics and teachers. In 1960–62, while visiting Pakistan, he reported that he was publicly recognized as a Murshid by Pir Barkat Ali, founder of Dar ul Ehsan. In 1966, after further Zen study with, among others, Sokei-An Sasaki and Sagaku Shaku, Lewis was ordained a "Zen-Shi" (Zen Master) by Korean Zen master Dr. Kyung-Bo Seo.

In 1967, whilst recovering from a heart attack in a hospital Lewis reported that he heard the voice of God say, "I make you spiritual leader of the hippies."

For the remainder of his life, Lewis traveled California, developing and teaching new forms of walking meditation as well as the Dances of Universal Peace, which draw on concepts from the many spiritual traditions he had encountered. Lewis' work in the Dances of Universal Peace was also inspired by his time with American dance pioneer Ruth St. Denis, whom he acknowledged as their "grandmother." In 1982, the organization now known as the International Network for the Dances of Universal Peace was founded by Saadi Neil Douglas-Klotz and Tasnim Hermila Fernandez for the purpose of promoting Lewis' vision of the Dances as a form of "peace through the arts." The organization subsequently published many of St Denis' previously unpublished writings on spiritual dance and the mysticism of the body.

In the late 1960s, Lewis began initiating and training students under the banner of Zen, and then later of Sufism. Just before his death in 1971, Lewis formed an esoteric organization now known as the Sufi Ruhaniat International to help carry on his Sufi initiatic lineage in the Chishti Sufi tradition. Lewis died in January 1971 as a result of a fall one month earlier. Before his death he appointed as his successor Khalif Moineddin Jablonski, who directed the organization from 1971 until his own death in 2001. Jablonski was succeeded by Shabda Kahn as Pir of the lineage.

== Dargah ==
When Samuel Lewis died, he asked that his body be buried at the interspiritual community of Lama Foundation, near Taos, New Mexico. The grave (called a "maqbara" in the Sufi tradition) became a pilgrimage site and was rebuilt several times in the intervening years. In August 2017, work was completed on a new building, called a "dargah," surrounding the gravesite. It is designed to facilitate visits by pilgrims in the same way that Sufi dargahs in other parts of the world do.

== Quotations ==
"No mechanical means, no rules, no rituals, nothing controlled by man alone can liberate man"

"The Sufi dervishes, using their feet...rid their minds of useless luggage. The ridding of luggage is more important than the method. What is needed is a method that works, not a philosophy about method which can be very confusing."

"Words are not peace. Thoughts are not peace. Plans are not peace. Programs are not peace. Peace is fundamental to all faiths. Peace is fullness, all inclusive...and must be experienced."

"One of the reasons I am teaching this music and dancing is to increase Joy, not awe towards another person, but bliss in our own self. This is finding God within, through experience."

== Students ==
- Pir Moineddin Jablonski
- Pir Shabda Kahn
- Murshid Wali Ali Meyer
- Murshid Shahabuddin Less

== Books ==
- In the Garden (ISBN 0517524120)
- The Jerusalem Trilogy: Song of the Prophets (ISBN 0915424037)
- Sufi Vision & Initiation: Meetings with Remarkable Beings (ISBN 091542410X)
- Spiritual Dance & Walk: An Introduction to the Dances of Universal Peace & Walking Meditations of Samuel L. Lewis (ISBN 0915424134)
- This is the New Age in Person Published by Sufi Islamia Ruhaniat Society (1972). Omen Press (ISBN 0912358130)
- Murshid – A Personal Memoir of Life with American Sufi Samuel L. Lewis by spiritual secretary of Samuel Lewis, Mansur Johnson (ISBN 0-915424-16-9)
