= Dances of Universal Peace =

Quasi-religious spiritual practice

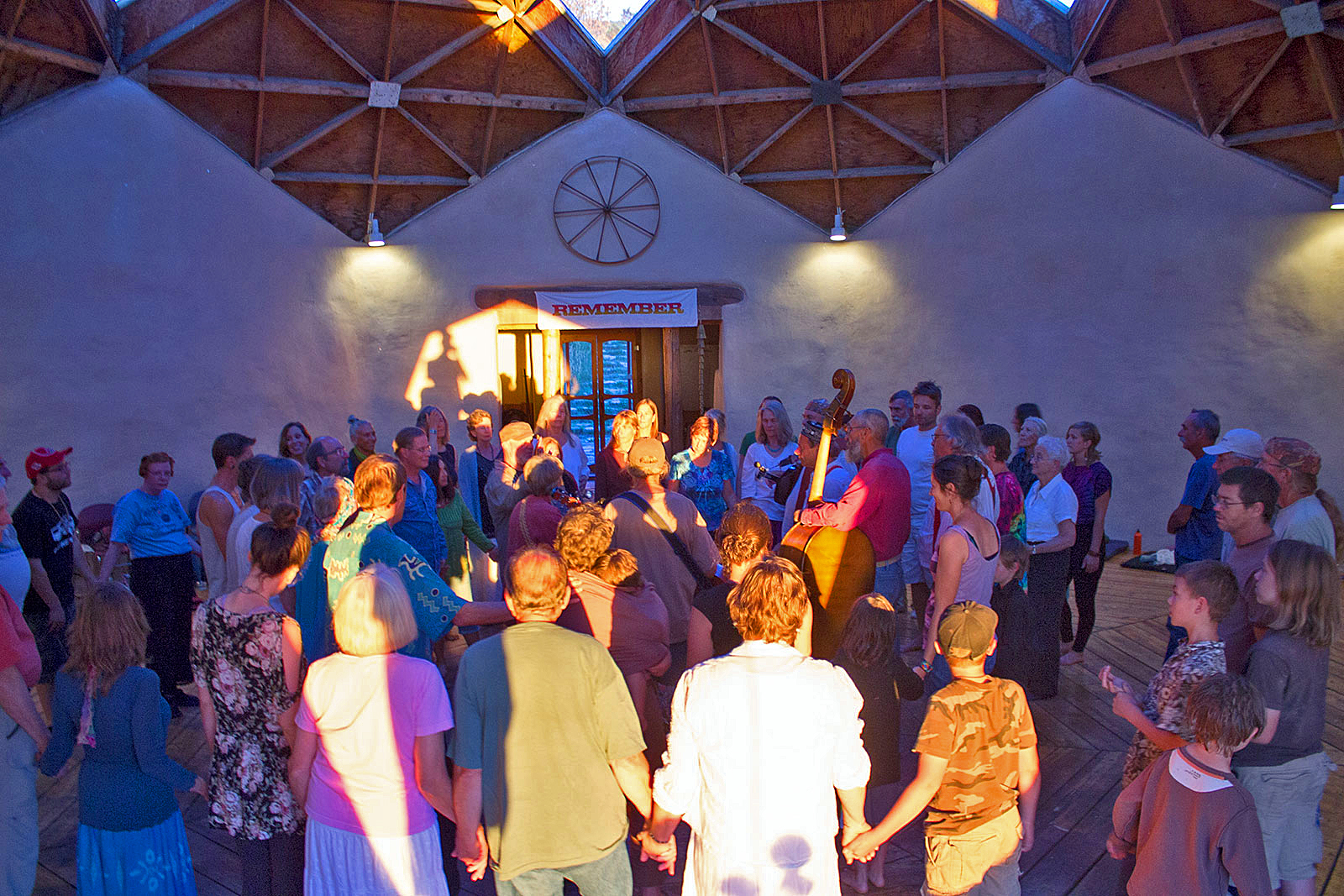
A 'Dances of Universal Peace' session with the dance teacher and accompanying musicians in the centre and the dancers of all ages and abilities in circles around them.

The Dances of Universal Peace (DUP) are a spiritual practice that employs singing and dancing the sacred phrases of the world's religions. Their intention is to raise consciousness and promote peace between diverse religions according to one stated goal. The DUP are of North American Sufic origin. They combine chants from many world faiths with dancing, whirling, and a variety of movement with singing.

== Format ==
Five to 500 dancers stand in a circle, often around a leader and musicians with acoustic instruments in the center. All dances are participatory and spectating is somewhat discouraged because joy is the goal, as opposed to the technical performance of specified dance steps or forms. Dances are facilitated by a dance leader who often plays a drum, guitar, flute or other stringed instrument. For lyrics, dances borrow inspirational poetry, quotes and chants which are sung as the dance is performed. Chants are often sacred phrases put to traditional, contemporary, or occasionally improvised melodies. A wide range of languages are deliberately employed including Arabic, Aramaic, English, Hawaiian, Hebrew, Persian, and Sanskrit. Dance promoters use diverse religious practices, chants and languages to demonstrate how joy lives at the heart of every religion. Dance leaders tend to believe peace can be promoted through experiencing the same One Joy through diverse dance steps, chants, and languages.

The DUP emphasis is on participation regardless of ability as DUP dances are almost never performed before an audience. Dancers of all levels, including children, are able to follow along and dance together. Each dance is taught afresh at each gathering. Dances and dancing of this kind is seen as opportunity to develop participants' spiritual awareness, hand-eye-body coordination, and competency in harmonizing with others through dance. Many dances are choreographed with movements, steps, and gestures encouraging dancers to explore for deeper mystical meanings of the dance.

== History ==
The Dances of Universal Peace were first formulated by Samuel L. Lewis (Sufi Ahmed Murad Chisti). The very first dance took place on 16 March, 1968 in San Francisco, California. The original dances were strongly influenced by Samuel Lewis' spiritual relationships with Ruth St. Denis, a modern dance pioneer, and Hazrat Inayat Khan, a Sufi master. The influence on the dances of Sufi practices such as Sema and The Whirling Dervishes are apparent, although Samuel Lewis was also a Rinzai Zen master and drew on the teachings of various religious and spiritual traditions.

Dances were originally performed at camps and meetings with a distinctly New Age and alternative feel but have increasingly been offered in diverse places of worship and more secular places such as schools, colleges, prisons, hospices, residential homes for those with special needs, and holistic health centers. The therapeutic uses of the Dances as well as the walking meditations developed by Samuel Lewis have also been explored in various settings. The Dances have developed into a global movement due to the work of the International Network for the Dances of Universal Peace founded in 1982 by Neil Douglas-Klotz and Tasnim Fernandez, who at that time were teachers in the Sufi Ruhaniat International and Sufi Order International respectively. Both have continued to be leading exponents of the Dances and Douglas-Klotz's creation of Dances using Aramaic words of Jesus has entered many alternative and mainstream religious circles. The Network has members in 28 countries.
