= Western Sufism =

New religious movement with its origins in traditional Sufism

Western Sufism, sometimes identified with Universal Sufism, Neo-Sufism, and Global Sufism, consists of a spectrum of Western European and North American manifestations and adaptations of Sufism, the mystical dimension of Islam. Many practitioners of Western Sufism follow the legacy of Inayat Khan and may identify with a variety of Sufi traditions, some of which have evolved to be pluralistic and not exclusively Islamic. In addition to Western Sufism, traditional Sufism also exists in the West, although it is significantly less prevalent among Muslims in the West than Sufism in the Muslim world. Most Sufi organizations in the West outside of the Balkans are Western Sufi.

Sufism flourished in Spain from the tenth to fifteenth centuries and spread throughout the Balkans during the Ottoman period. Enslaved Africans maintained Sufi traditions in the Americas. It was not until the twentieth century, however, that Sufi organizations were established in Western Europe and North America. Inayat Khan promulgated Sufism in the United States and Europe from 1910 to 1926. In 1911 Ivan Aguéli established a Sufi society in Paris.

Inayat Khan's legacy has sometimes been associated with the neologism "Universal Sufism", though he never used the phrase. Inayat Khan opened his London-based Sufi Order to people of all faiths and simultaneously founded the Anjuman-i Islam (Islamic Society) for "the furtherance of the study of Islam and unity between the Muslims and the non-Muslims in the world by discovering the universal spirit of Islam." Aguéli's legacy is associated with the Traditionalism and Perennialism of his student René Guénon.

== The Legacy of Inayat Khan ==
The scion of a family of Indian mystics and musicians of Central Asian origin, Inayat Khan, was trained and authorized in the Chishti, Suhrawardi, Qadiri, and Naqshbandi orders of Sufism. The Chishti order had for centuries engaged with Hindu spiritual traditions, thus exemplifying a broader Indian cultural phenomenon popularly known as ganga-jamni tahzib. In a similar fashion, Inayat Khan saw his mission as the spiritual unification of the Abrahamic (Jewish, Christian and Islamic) and Vedic traditions of monotheism. To this end, at the request of his students, he founded The Sufi Order in London in 1918 and The Sufi Movement in Geneva in 1923. At the time of his death in India in 1927, Sufi centers had been established in the United States, England, France, the Netherlands, Germany, Sweden, and Switzerland.

Following the death of Inayat Khan, his brother Maheboob Khan was elected to lead his movement. On the latter's death in 1948, their cousin Mohammed Ali Khan was elected leader. Inayat Khan's eldest son and Sajjadanishin Vilayat Inayat Khan deferred to Mohammed Ali Khan, but subsequently assumed his father's mantle in 1956. His lineage, traced via his elder sister Noor Inayat Khan (d. 1944) and now represented by his eldest son and successor Zia Inayat-Khan, is known today as the Inayatiyya.

Mohammed Ali Khan (d. 1958) designated Maheboob Khan's son Mahmood Khan (1927-) as his successor, but the latter stood down in deference to his uncle Musharaff Khan. Following Musharaff Khan's death in 1967, the Sufi Movement was led in turns by Fazal Inayat Khan (d. 1990) and Hidayat Inayat Khan (d. 2016). The current Representative General of the Sufi Movement is Nawab Pasnak. In 2021, students of Mahmood Khan established the International Sufi Centre 1923 as an alternative structure for members of the Sufi Movement.

Fazal left the Sufi Movement in 1988 and founded a new organization named The Sufi Way. Its current leader is Elias Amidon.

== Sufism Reoriented ==
Rabia Martin (d. 1947), who served as the North American representative of the Sufi Movement in Inayat Khan's lifetime, broke away when Maheboob Khan assumed leadership. Another disciple of Inayat Khan, Samuel Lewis (Sufi Ahmed Murad Chisti, d. 1971), left with her, but subsequently broke from her when she affiliated herself with Meher Baba. Rabia Martin's successor Ivy Duce went on to found an organization under the leadership of Meher Baba named Sufism Reoriented. The Sufism Reoriented Sanctuary is located in Walnut Creek, California. Ivy Duce also founded The Meher School in 1975 in Walnut Creek. Sufism Reoriented has two other centers, in Washington DC and Myrtle Beach, South Carolina.

== Other Sufi centers ==
Another organization, known as Sufi Contact, was founded by the Dutch Sufi proponent Gauri Voute. Its structure is strictly egalitarian; hence, there is no central leader. Samuel Lewis founded a California-based organization named Sufi Islamia Ruhaniat Society. Now known as Sufi Ruhaniat International, its current leader is Shabda Kahn.

== See also ==
- Friedrich von Frankenberg, founder of the first Sufi society in Australia
