= Fazal Inayat-Khan =

Poet and new age spiritualist (1968–1982)

Pir-o-Murshid Fazal Inayat-Khan

Fazal Inayat-Khan (Urdu: فضل عنایت خان) (July 20, 1942 – September 26, 1990), also known as Frank Kevlin, was a psychotherapist and poet who led the Inayati Order from 1968 to 1982.

He was the author of Old Thinking, New Thinking: The Sufi Prism (1979) and, published in Dutch, Modern soefisme: over creatieve verandering en spirituele groei (Modern Sufism: On Creative Change and Spiritual Growth) (1992).

== Life and career ==
Born in Montélimar, Vichy France to a Dutch mother and the composer, Hidayat Inayat Khan, Inayat-Khan was brought up speaking Hindi, Dutch, English and French. His grandfather was Inayat Khan and his aunt was Noor Inayat Khan. Fazal Inayat-Khan is buried at the Oud Eik en Duinen cemetery in The Hague.

Inayat-Khan found work as a poet, psychotherapist and publisher. Finding that his family name influenced people's perception of his work, he changed his name legally to Frank Kevlin. As an early promoter of Neuro Linguistic Programming, he was the main motivating force behind the creation of the Association for Neuro Linguistic Programming.

From 1968 to 1982 he was head of The Sufi Movement, a movement started by his grandfather and kept in the family. He held that Sufism has three aspects: it is non-definitive, inclusive, and experiential:

- non-definitive because the real exists without needing to be defined;
- inclusive because it is found in all religions and accepts any form of worship or meditative practice that is appropriate to the moment;
- experiential because it goes beyond theology and second-hand spiritual experience, accepting the possibility of direct revelation.

== Works ==
- Inayat-Khan, Fazal (1979). Old Thinking, New Thinking: The Sufi Pism. San Francisco: Harper & Row. ISBN 0-06-064086-3.
- Inayat-Khan, Fazal (1992). Modern soefisme : over creatieve verandering en spirituele groei (Modern Sufism: On Creative Change and Spiritual Growth) (in Dutch). Katwijk aan Zee: Panta Rhei. ISBN 90-73207-28-2. OCLC 65771646.

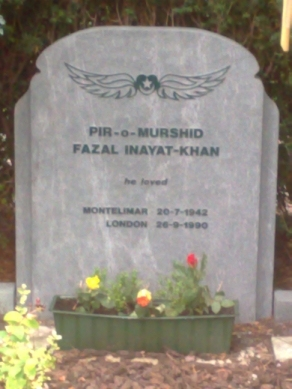
Inayat-Khan's grave, The Hague, Netherlands
