= Musharaff Moulamia Khan =

Leader of the Inayati Sufi order (1895–1967)

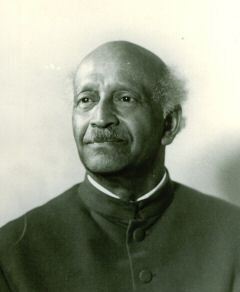
Pir-o-Murshid Musharaff Khan

Musharaff Moulamia Khan was born in Baroda (India) on 6 September 1895 and died in The Hague (Netherlands) on 30 November 1967. Не was the youngest brother of Inayat Khan, and shared his delight in music. While in his teens he had just come to Calcutta to study and be under the influence of his brother when Inayat was called away to America, and Musharaff was left alone. Within a year, however, he also journeyed to the west, where he joined Inayat and became one of 'The Royal Musicians of Hindustan.'

In the west, Musharaff took up the western method of vocal production and developed a strong tenor voice. To adapt to western business ways and make a career of music, though, was not so easy. In the words of Inayat, "After many years of his stay in the West, Musharaff kept to the East just the same, in his way of looking at things and especially in living in eternity."

Musharaff was married twice, once to Savitri van Rossum du Chattel, who died in India in 1946, and a second time, to Shahzadi de Koningh, with whom he lived in The Hague and who survived his death in 1967.

On the death of Pir-o-Murshid Ali Khan in 1958, Pir-o-Murshid Musharaff assumed the leadership of The Sufi Order. Musharaff led the Sufi Order until his death in 1968.

== Music ==
LP recordings:

- Musharaff Khan – "The Sacred River Narmada (mp3) (1925)".
- "Moloud" (Sama Songs of Hazrat Inayat Khan) Kungl Hovmusikhandel Svala & Soderlund, Stockholm, Sweden. 1950.
- "Bhajan or Sangitha" (Sama Songs of Hazrat Inayat Khan) Kungl Hovmusikhandel Svala & Soderlund, Stockholm, Sweden. 1950.
- "Derwish Song or Tarana" (Sama Songs of Hazrat Inayat Khan) Kungl Hovmusikhandel Svala & Soderlund, Stockholm, Sweden. 1950.
- "Yogia or Dawnn Song by Balakastan" (Sama Songs of Hazrat Inayat Khan) Kungl Hovmusikhandel Svala & Soderlund, Stockholm, Sweden. 1950.
- "ParaMahatma" (Sama Songs of Hazrat Inayat Khan) Kungl Hovmusikhandel Svala & Soderlund, Stockholm, Sweden. 1950.
- "Sufi Songs", sung by Pir-o-Murshid Musharaff Khan accompanied by Hakeem van Lohuizen (piano) Promoted by International Headquarters of the Sufi Movement, Geneva, 1968. (13:40).

== Books ==
- Pages in the Life of a Sufi. Reflections and Reminiscences, Etc. [With a Portrait.]. Musharraf Mu'allimīyah Khān. Rider & Company, 1932. 128pp.
- Musharaff Moulamia Khan "Pages in the Life of a Sufi", Den Haag – East West Publications, 1982. 155pp. ISBN 90-6271-662-8. Third Edition.
- Musharaff Moulamia Khan "Pages in the Life of a Sufi", Moscow (Russian translation) – Sfera Publishers, 2002. 148pp. ISBN 5-93975-088-5
- Musharaff Moulamia Khan "Seiten im Leben eines Sufi. Betrachtungen und Begebenheiten", Zurich (German translation by Puran Füchslin) – Petama Project, 2011. ISBN 978-3-907643-14-3
- Musharaff Moulamia Khan "Der Zauber Indiens – Aus dem Leben eines Sufi", Weinstadt – Verlag Heilbronn, 2014, 208 Seiten, ISBN 978-3-936246-08-7.

== About him ==
- Heinrich Orlov. Music Tree. H. A. Frager & Co. "Soviet composer". Washington – St. Petersburg. 1992. (pp. 81 and 393).
- Indian Classical Music and Gharana Tradition by R. C. Mehta. Publisher: Readworthy Publications Pvt Ltd; (2011) Chapter 8.
