= ANLP =

ANLP may refer to:

- African Nutrition Leadership Programme
- Association for Neuro Linguistic Programming
