= Pierre Bernard (yogi) =

Yoga and tantra teacher (1875–1955)

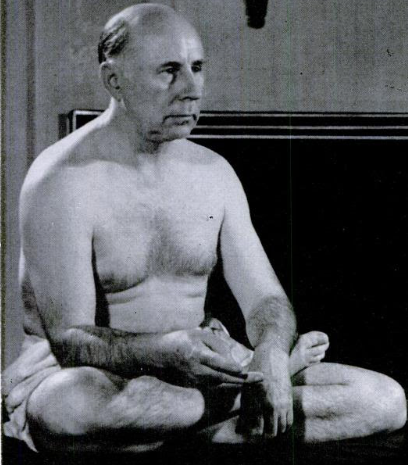
- Bernard in 1939
- Born: Perry Arnold Baker; 31 October 1875; Leon, Iowa, United States
- Died: 27 September 1955 (aged 79); New York City, United States
- Spouse: Blanche DeVries Bernard

Pierre Arnold Bernard (October 31, 1875 – September 27, 1955) — known as "The Great Oom", "The Omnipotent Oom" and "Oom the Magnificent" — was a pioneering American yogi, scholar, occultist, philosopher, mystic and businessman.

== Biography ==
Due to his practice of keeping his origins obscure, little is known for certain about his early life. He is reported to have been born Perry Arnold Baker or Peter Coon in Leon, Iowa, 31 October 1875, the son of a barber. He also used the name Homer Stansbury Leeds.

Bernard was trained in yoga by an accomplished Tantric yogi known as Sylvais Hamati, under whom Bernard studied for years. He met Hamati in Lincoln, Nebraska in the late 1880s, and they travelled together. Hamati taught Bernard the body-control techniques of hatha yoga. After several years of study, Bernard was supposedly able to put himself into a trance deep enough to withstand piercings by surgical needles without anesthesia. He gave a public demonstration of what he termed the "Kali mudra" (a simulated, so-called "death trance") in January 1898 to a group of physicians in San Francisco. During the demonstration, Dr. D. McMillan inserted a surgical needle "slowly through one of Bernard's earlobes". Needles were also pushed through his cheek, upper lip, and nostril. On January 29, 1898, Bernard was featured on the front page of The New York Times.

Bernard then took interest in hypnotism. In 1905, he founded the Bacchante Academy with Mortimer K. Hargis to teach hypnotism and "sexual practices." The organization declined because of the 1906 San Francisco earthquake, and their partnership dissolved.

Bernard claimed to have traveled to Kashmir and Bengal before founding the Tantrik Order of America in 1905 or 1906 (variously reported as starting in San Francisco, Seattle, Tacoma, Washington, or Portland, Oregon); the New York Sanskrit College in 1910; and the Clarkstown Country Club (originally called the Braeburn Country Club), a seventy-two acre estate with a thirty-room mansion in Nyack, New York, a gift from a disciple, in 1918. He eventually expanded to a chain of "tantric clinics" in cities such as Cleveland, Philadelphia, Chicago, and New York City. Bernard is widely credited as the first American to introduce the philosophy and practices of yoga and tantra to the American people. He also played a critical role in establishing a greatly exaggerated association of tantra with the use of sex for mystical purposes in the American mindset.

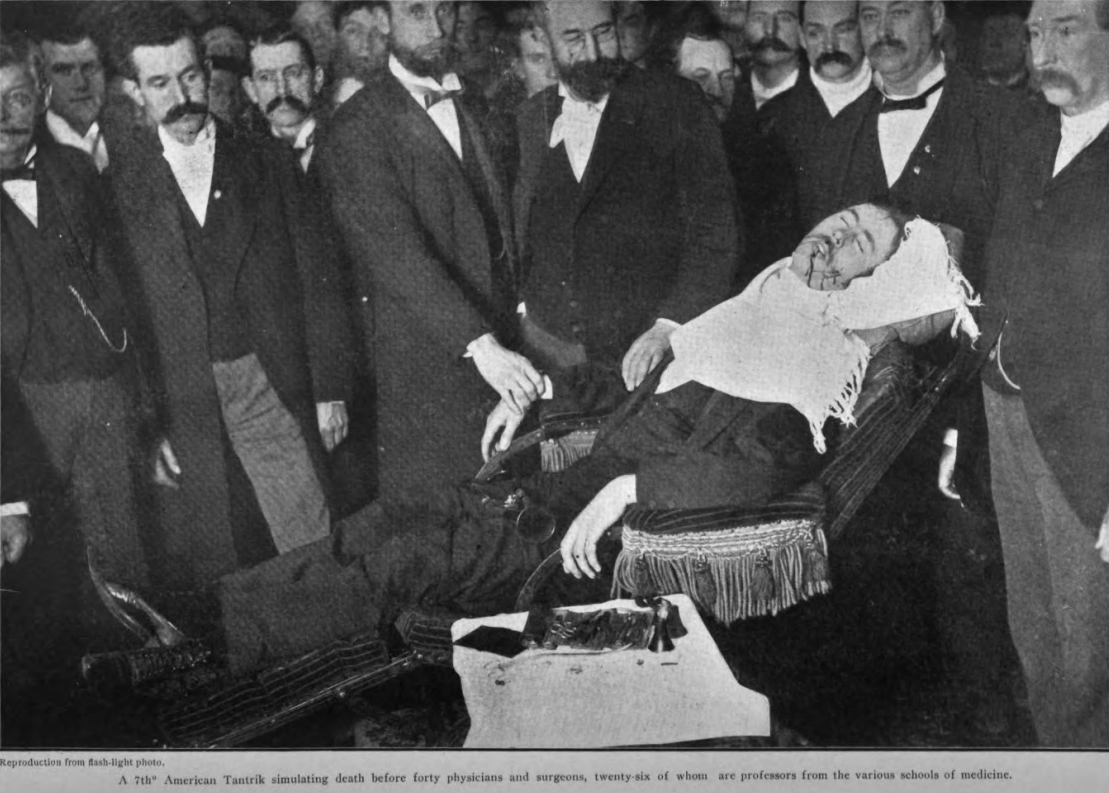
Pierre Bernard demonstrating the "Kali Mudra" death trance

In 1910, two teenage girls, Zella Hopp and Gertrude Leo, feeling that he had taken too much psychic control over their lives, had him charged with kidnapping (alleging that Leo had been prevented three times from leaving the institute) and briefly imprisoned. Hopp reported that, for a pre-induction, Bernard had her strip and placed his hand upon her left breast, explaining that he was testing her heartbeat. "I cannot tell you how Bernard got his control over me or how he gets it over other people. He is the most wonderful man in the world. No women seem able to resist him.... He had promised to marry me many times. But when he began the same thing with my little sister [Mary, age sixteen] I decided I would expose the whole matter. If it had only been myself I wouldn't have done it for the whole world." Three months later, the charges were dropped.

He remained popular with upper-middle class women and the high society of New York throughout the 1920s and 30s. He married Blanche de Vries, who taught yoga in New York into her eighties; combining yoga with "Eastern-inspired" sensual dance and contributing to a shift in attitudes about women's autonomy and sexuality. Historian of religion Robert C. Fuller has commented that Bernard's "sexual teachings generated such scandal that he was eventually forced to discontinue his public promulgation of Tantrism. Yet by this time Bernard had succeeded in making lasting contributions to the history of American alternative spirituality." In his The Story of Yoga, the cultural historian Alistair Shearer acknowledges Bernard's importance but states that he gave yoga a bad reputation and called him a "roguey yogi".

Bernard trained boxer Lou Nova in yoga. Bernard was involved with more conventional businesses, including baseball stadiums, dog tracks, an airport, and became president of the State Bank of Pearl River in 1931.

Lecturers at the Clarkstown Country Club included Ruth Fuller Everett and Leopold Stokowski. One of Bernard's students was Ida Rolf. Scholars from across the United States visited Bernard's library; it was said to have been the best Sanskrit collection in the country and to contain some 7000 volumes of philosophy, ethics, psychology, education, metaphysics, and related material on physiology and medicine.

Bernard died on September 27, 1955 at French Hospital in New York.

== Family ==
He was uncle of Theos Bernard, an American scholar of religion, explorer and famous practitioner of Hatha Yoga and Tibetan Buddhism.

His half-sister Ora Ray Baker (Ameena Begum) married Inayat Khan after they met in 1912 at Bernard's Sanskrit College. Bernard adamantly opposed the match and Ora literally ran away from home to be with Inayat Khan, showing-up unannounced on his doorstep in London. She subsequently became the mother of Sufi teacher Pir Vilayat Inayat Khan (1916–2004), World War II spy Noor-un-Nissa Inayat Khan (1914–1944), Hidayat Inayat Khan (1917–2016) and Khair-un-Nisa (Claire) (1919–2011).

== Publications ==
Bernard published the International Journal: Tantrik Order. Only one issue was published in 1906.

- International Journal: Tantrik Order 1 (5).
- Vira Sadhana: A Theory and Practice of Veda (American Import Book Company, 1919)

== Sources ==
- de Jong-Keesing, Elisabeth (1974). Inayat Khan. A Biography. East-West Publications. ISBN 978-0-7189-0243-8.
- Fuller, Robert C. (2008). Spirituality in the Flesh: Bodily Sources of Religious Experiences. Oxford University Press. ISBN 978-0-19-536917-5.
- Kripal, Jeffrey J. (2007). "Remembering Ourselves: On Some Countercultural Echoes of Contemporary Tantric Studies" (PDF). Religions of South Asia. 1 (1): 11–28. doi:10.1558/rosa.v1i1.11. Archived from the original (PDF) on 2019-04-17.
- Love, Robert (2010). The Great Oom: The Improbable Birth of Yoga in America. Viking. ISBN 978-0670021758.
- Laycock, Joseph (2013). "Yoga for the New Woman and the New Man: The Role of Pierre Bernard and Blanche DeVries in the Creation of Modern Postural Yoga". Religion and American Culture: A Journal of Interpretation. 23 (1): 101–136. doi:10.1525/rac.2013.23.1.101. JSTOR 10.1525/rac.2013.23.1.101. S2CID 146680587.
- Melton, J. Gordon (1999). Religious leaders of America: A Biographical Guide to Founders and Leaders of Religious Bodies, Churches, and Spiritual Groups in North America. Gale Research. ISBN 978-0810388789.
- Sann, Paul (1967). Fads, Follies, and Delusions of the American People. Crown Publishers.
- Shearer, Alistair (2020). The Story of Yoga: From Ancient India to the Modern West. London: Hurst Publishers. ISBN 978-1-78738-192-6.
- Stirling, Isabel (2006). Zen Pioneer: The Life & Works of Ruth Fuller Sasaki. Counterpoint.
- Urban, Hugh B. (2001). "The Omnipotent Oom: Tantra and its Impact on Modern Western Esotericism". Esoterica: The Journal of Esoteric Studies (3): 218–259.
- Weir, David (2011). American Orient: Imagining the East from the Colonial Era through the Twentieth Century. University of Massachusetts Press. ISBN 978-1-55849-879-2.
