= Sufism Reoriented Sanctuary =

Sufi temple in Walnut Creek, California

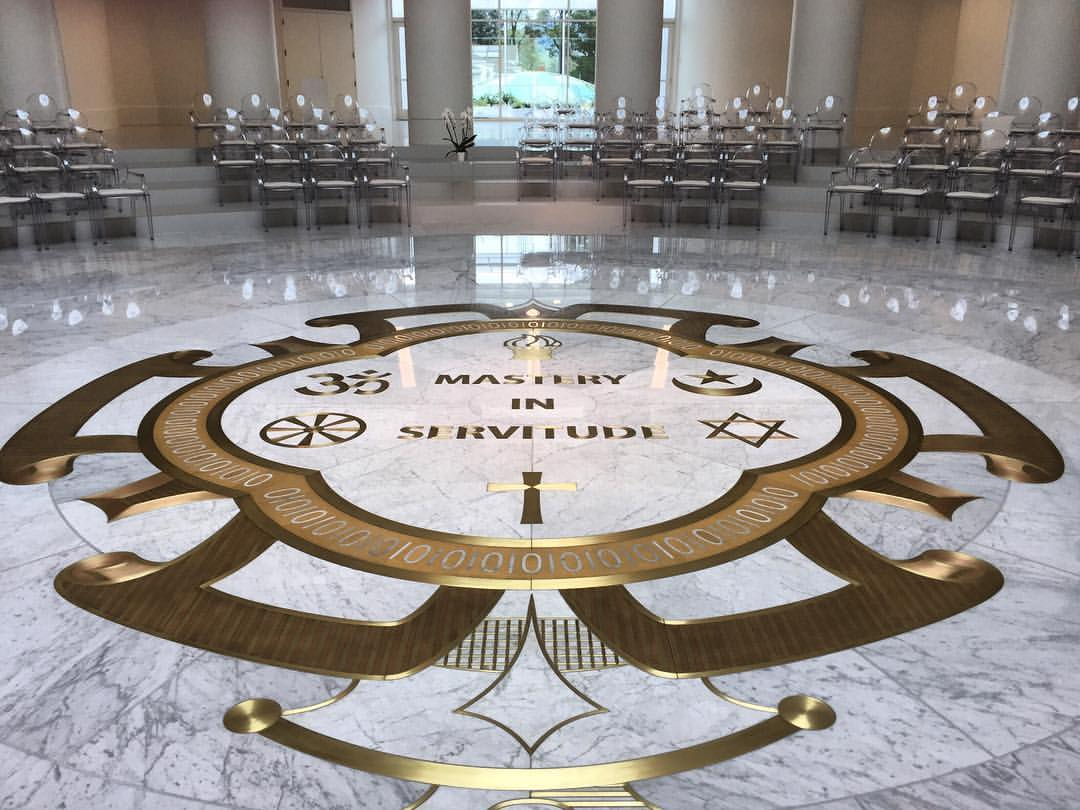
- Mastery in Servitude

Religion
- Deity: Meher Baba
- Governing body: Sufism Reoriented; Ira Deitrick (President)
- Leadership: Ira Deitrick
- Patron: Ivy Oneita Duce

Location
- Location: Walnut Creek, California
- State: California
- Country: United States

Architecture
- Architect: Alan Ritchie
- Style: 13 Interlocking Domes
- Established: 1952
- Completed: 2016

Website
- Sufism Reoriented

Sufism Reoriented Sanctuary is a universal spiritual retreat located in Walnut Creek, California, United States. The sanctuary is located at 11 White Horse Court. Sufism Reoriented was founded and rechristened by spiritual master Meher Baba in 1952.

== Sanctuary ==
The Sufism Reoriented sanctuary is located in Saranap, an unincorporated village in Contra Costa County, California. Carol Weyland Conner, a clinical psychologist, served as the spiritual leader of Sufism Reoriented from June 2001 until her death in April 2023. The current spiritual leader of Sufism Reoriented is Walker Lambert.

== Construction ==
Overaa Construction, under project director Bob Carpenter and project architect Alan Ritchie, constructed the sanctuary between 2012 and 2016. The sanctuary is a winner of an ENR California Best Project Award and a finalist for Global CEMEX Building Award. Sufism Reoriented intended the sanctuary to last over 700 years.

The construction of the sanctuary received pushback from the surrounding residents, organized under the group, the Saranap Community Association. The funds for the construction largely came from the private finances of David M. Overton, the founder and current chief executive officer of the The Cheesecake Factory.

== History ==
In 1947, Murshida Rabia Martin, who served as the North American representative of the Sufi Movement in Inayat Khan's lifetime, broke away when Maheboob Khan assumed leadership. Another disciple of Inayat Khan, Samuel Lewis (Sufi Ahmed Murad Chisti, d. 1971), left with her, but subsequently broke from her when Rabia Martin associated herself with Meher Baba. Meher Baba, with the support of Rabia Martin's successor, Ivy Oneita Duce, reorganized this branch of the Sufi Movement and renamed it Sufism Reoriented.

== Murshida and line of succession ==
- Ivy Oneita Duce
- James S. B. Mackie
- Carol Weyland Conner
- Walker Lambert
