= Francis Brabazon =

Australian poet (1907–1984)

- Born: 24 January 1907; London, England
- Died: 24 June 1984 (aged 77); Queensland, Australia
- Occupation: Poet

Francis Brabazon (24 January 1907 – 24 June 1984) was an Australian poet and a member of Meher Baba's mandali.

Brabazon was born in London, but moved to Australia with his family when he was still a boy. At the age of 21, he embarked on a quest to discover the relationship between beauty and truth. He studied music and painting and finally found his niche in poetry. In the 1940s, Brabazon became interested in Eastern spirituality and soon became a student of the Australian Sufi leader Baron Friedrich von Frankenberg.

With the death of his Sufi teacher in 1950, Brabazon became the head of the Sufi Movement in Australia. He met Meher Baba on a trip to America in 1952 and later described Baba as "the very personification of truth and the very embodiment of beauty." After returning to Australia, Francis and a party of helpers managed to complete "Beacon Hill house" near Sydney in time for Baba's first visit to Australia in August 1956. It was later renamed "Meher House". In 1958 Brabazon established a new centre on a 100-acre (40 ha) estate on Kiel Mountain, Woombye, Queensland to host Meher Baba on his second visit. This was named Avatar's Abode.

Brabazon's grave is on Avatar's Abode and the Avatar's Abode Trust holds copyright of his works.

== Publications ==
=== Books by Francis Brabazon ===
- Early Poems, 1953, Sydney: Beacon Hill Publishing.
- Proletarians Transition, 1953, Sydney: Beacon Hill Publishing
- 7 Stars to Morning, 1956, Sydney: Morgan's Bookshop
- Cantos of Wandering, 1957, Sydney: Beacon Hill Publishing
- Singing Threshold, 1958, Sydney: Beacon Hill Publishing
- Stay With God: A statement in illusion on Reality, 1959, Sydney, Garuda Books. 1977, Bombay, Meher House Publication. 1990, Melbourne, New Humanity Books. (ISBN 0949191078)
- Let Us the People Sing, 1962, Poona, India: Privately published
- The East West Gathering, 1963, Sydney: Meher House Publications
- The Word at World's End, 1971, Berkeley: John F. Kennedy Press
- In Dust I Sing, 1974, Berkeley: The Beguine Library
- Four and Twenty Blackbirds, 1975, Myrtle Beach: Sheriar Press
- The Wind of the Word, 1976, Sydney: Garuda Publications
- The Silent Word: Being some chapters of the life of Avatar Meher Baba, 1978, Sydney: Meher Baba Foundation Australia
- The Golden Book of Praise, 1982, California: The Awakener Press
- The Beloved is All in All, 1988, New Jersey: Beloved Books

=== Pamphlets by Francis Brabazon ===
- The Birth of the Nation, 1956, Sydney: Meher House
- The Lord Is Our Brother, 25 February 1959, Address, Bombay Press Conference

=== Booklets by Francis Brabazon ===
- Three Talks: Francis Brabazon, 1969, Sydney: Meher House
- Journey With God, 1954, Sydney: Beacon Hill Publishing
