= Ameena Begum =

Spouse of Sufi Master Inayat Khan (1892–1949)

- Pirani Ameena Begum
- Born: Ora Ray Baker; 8 May 1892; Albuquerque, New Mexico, US
- Died: 1 May 1949 (aged 56); Paris, France
- Known for: Her influence helping Sufism spread to the western world
- Spouse: Inayat Khan
- Children: Noor-un-Nisa, Vilayat, Hidayat, and Khair-un-Nisa (Claire)
- Father: Erastus Warren Baker
- Relatives: Pierre Bernard (half-brother)

Pirani Ameena Begum (Hindustani: अमीना बेगम / امینہ بیگم; born Ora Ray Baker; 8 May 1892 – 1 May 1949) was a writer and poet who was the wife of Sufi Master Inayat Khan and the mother of their four children: World War II SOE agent Noor-un-Nisa (1914–1944), Vilayat (1916–2004), Hidayat (1917–2016) and Khair-un-Nisa (Claire) (1919–2011).

== Life ==
Baker first met Inayat Khan in New York in 1911 when her half-brother and guardian, Pierre Bernard, engaged the master musician and mystic to teach his ward Indian music. However, he forbade the marriage and Khan sailed for London. Baker found his Indian home address among Bernard's papers when cleaning his desk; the letter was forwarded and she sailed for England alone. They married in 1912 or 1913 in London, at which point she took the name "Ameena Begum". After living in London and then Paris, they traveled to Moscow, where she gave birth to Noor (January 1, 1914) the new family returned to Paris in July. World War I started in August and they left for England where they remained for the duration of the war. She left a collection of 101 poems, "A Rosary of One Hundred and One Beads". Some poems were lost during World War II, but 54 have been preserved and were published in 1998. She has sometimes been reported to be the cousin of Mary Baker Eddy, however this does not seem to be the case. (Note: According to Robert Love, "There are many errors in the short bios of Ora Ray Baker, including the date of her marriage to Khan and her alleged relationship to Mary Baker Eddy. Fuller quotes reliably from the marriage certificate. As for the Baker Eddy connection, it does not appear to exist.")

Hidayat Inayat Khan wrote: "In 1926, Hazrat Inayat Khan gave my Mother an exceptional initiation as 'Pirani', which was only to be given to her. That special initiation was not to be given to any one else in the Sufi Movement, either in the present or in the future." Hazrat Inayat Khan said in his autobiography that without Ameena Begum's help he would never have been able to bring his Sufi Message to the Western world.

== Articles and poetry ==
- "A Mother's Revelation". The Sufi. Vol. I, no. 1. February 1915.
- "Women's Seclusion in the East". The Sufi. Vol. I, no. 3. September 1915.
- "The Children of Today". The Sufi. May 1917.
- "Poems from Thy Rosary of a Hundred Beads". Caravanseari. November 1988. pp. 31–34. Collection of poems.
- "Poems from Thy Rosary of a Hundred Beads". Once upon a time... Groningen. November 1988. pp. 53–87.
- Rosary of a Hundred Beads. Petama Books. 2008.
