= Maheboob Khan =

Indian classical musician (1887–1948)

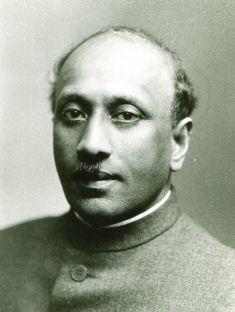
- Khan in 1931
- Born: Shaikh-ul-Mashaik Pyaromir Maheboob Khan; 1887; Baroda, India
- Died: The Hague, Netherlands
- Burial place: Oud Eik en Duinen
- Occupations: Musician; composer
- Years active: 1920s–1948
- Style: Indian classical music
- Movement: International Sufi Movement
- Relatives: Inayat Khan (brother)

Shaikh-ul-Mashaik Pyaromir Maheboob Khan (1887, Baroda, India – 1948, The Hague, Netherlands) was an Indian classical musician and younger brother to Inayat Khan. He became the representative of the International Sufi Movement upon his brother's death in 1927.

== Biography ==
Khan's grandfather, Maula Bakhsh, recognised his ability in improvisation and trained him in music alongside his brother, Inayat. As he grew up, Khan was exposed more to European classical music than Inayat had been, and he took up conducting and an interest in Western music theory.

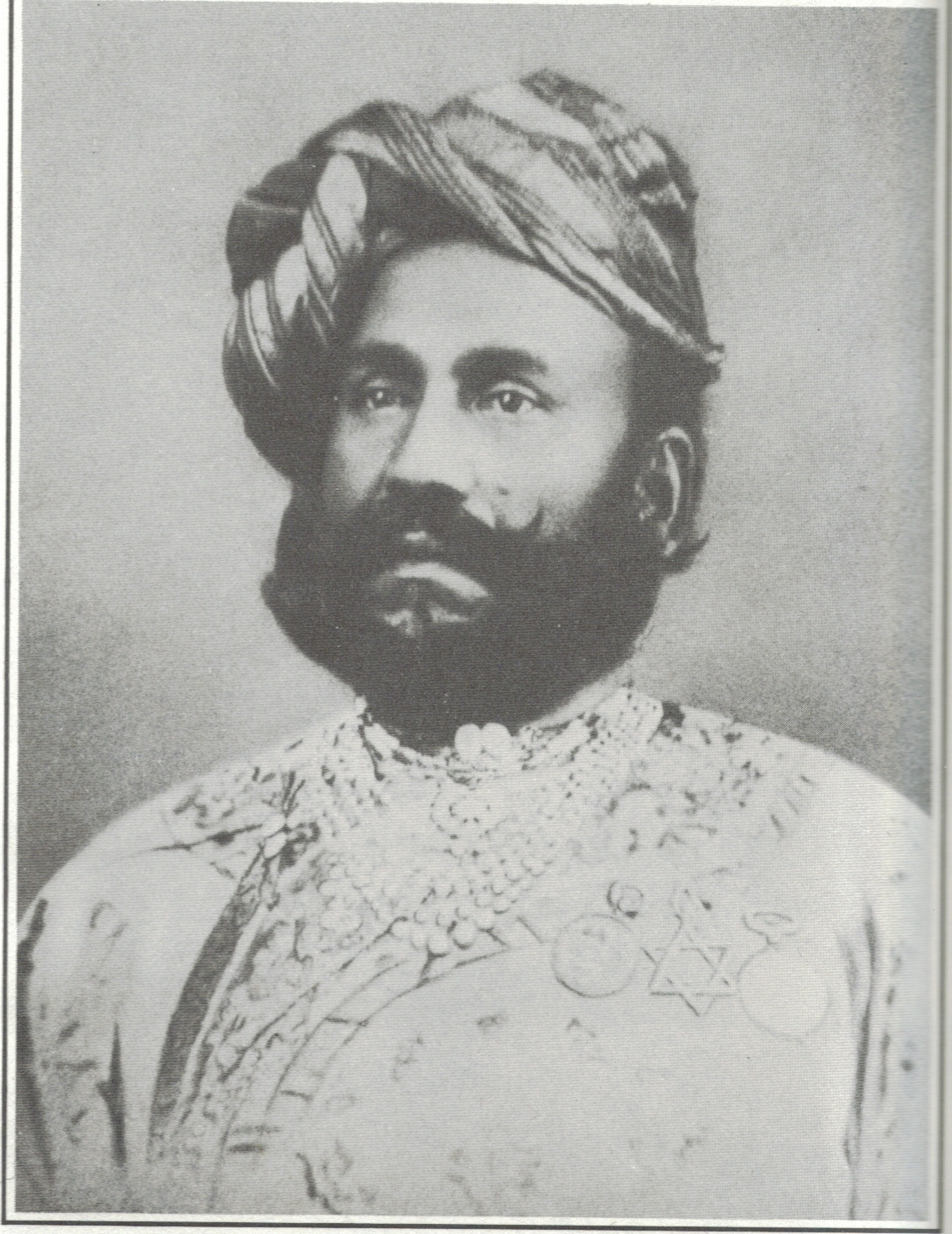
Khan's grandfather, Maula Bakhsh (1833–1896)

When Inayat left Baroda, he entrusted his music students to Maheboob, though when Inayat sailed to the West in 1910, Maheboob accompanied him. He settled in the Hague, marrying the Dutch disciple Shadbiy van Goens, with whom he had two children: Raheemunnisa and Mahmood. Khan, his wife and their daughter, Raheemmunisa, are buried in one grave at the Oud Eik en Duinen cemetery in the Hague.

In Europe, Khan learned musical composition and singing with the composer and musicologist Edmond Bailly. Khan had a particularly strong voice, and while musical, intelligent and thoughtful, he would rarely sing for others. There is a story that Inayat and his cousin (who according to Indian custom was considered a brother) Ali Khan would sometimes pretend to go out, slamming the front door, then wait quietly in the front hall to hear Maheboob practise his singing. He composed more than 60 sacred songs. Barbara Blatherwick, a coloratura soprano, performed his songs in her 1937 recital at New York Town Hall. Khan composed a song on a sacred poem by Inayat, "Before You Judge", but could not bring himself to show it to his brother, who died without having heard it.

Upon the death of Inayat in 1927, Khan took the responsibility of leading the International Sufi Movement (now known as the Inayati Order), a post he held until his own death in 1948. He promoted the Sufi message through the difficulties of World War II, for which he is remembered with love, respect and gratitude.

== Discopgraphy ==
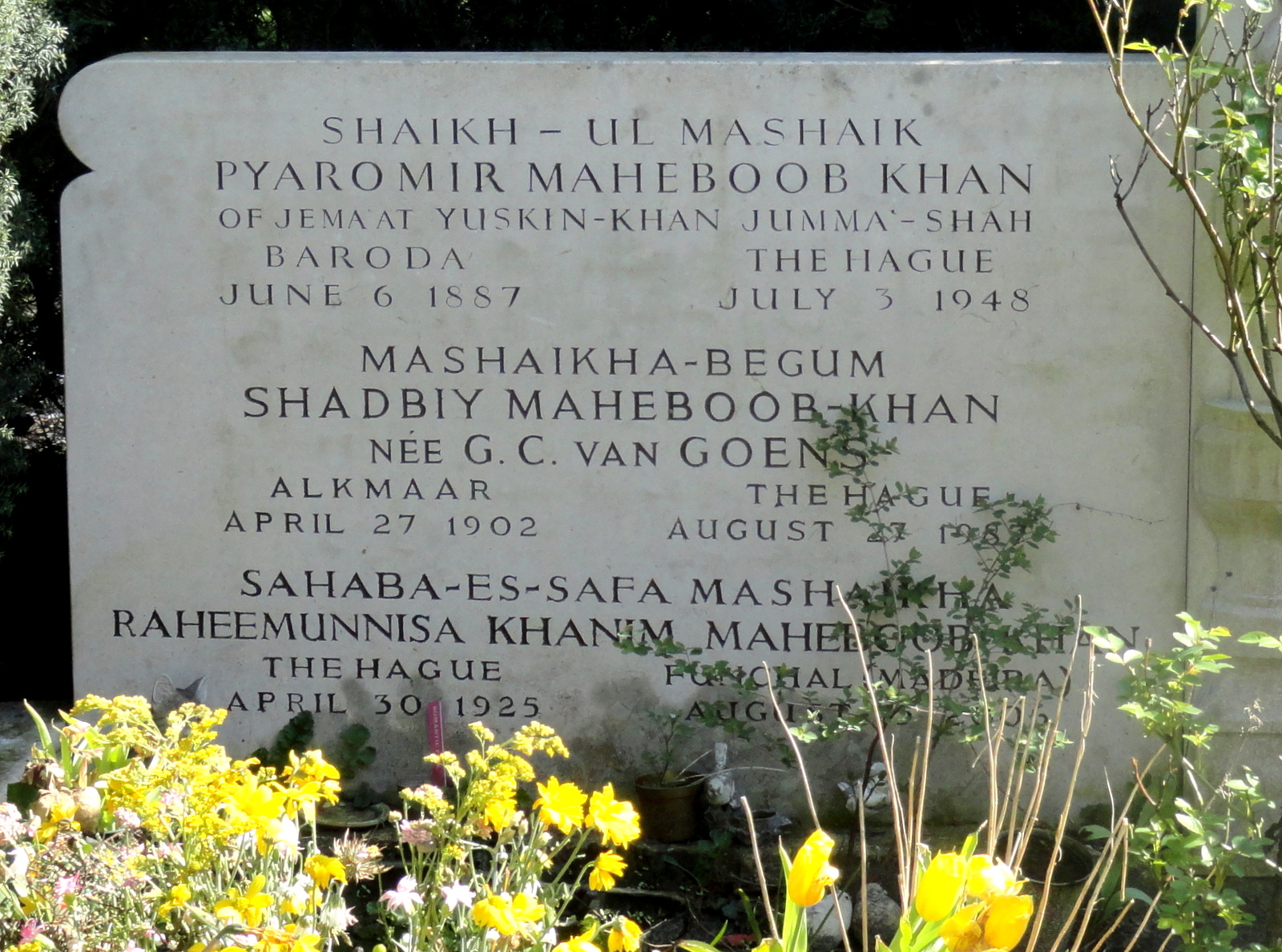
The grave of Khan, his wife and daughter at Oud Eik en Duinen cemetery, the Hague

=== LP recordings ===
- Maheboob Khan. "Qawwali Asti Bulbul" (3:14) (melody by Inayat Khan) (1925) mp3
- Maheboob Khan. "Qawwali Saki. Derwish Song" (3:25) (Rag Kalyan) (1925) mp3

=== Scores ===
- "Molood" – Song and music. "The Sufi" magazine (London) 1915 February
- "Kaseeda", Music and song. "The Sufi" magazine (London) 1915 May
- "Naat", Music and text. "The Sufi" magazine (London) 1915 September
- "Kawwali", Song, text and music. "The Sufi" magazine (London) 1915 November
- "Ishk me tere Kohegam". Song, with P. F. accompaniment, by Maheboob Khan. (Maḣbūb Khān). London: Indian Art & Dramatic Society, 1916
- "Kaseeda, Ganga Gumni", Text and scores. "The Sufi" magazine (London) 1916 April
- "Gazal I Hafiz" (Words by Inayat Khan). "The Sufi" magazine (London) 1916 November
- "Masnavi" (Words by Jalaluddin Rumi). "The Sufi" magazine (London) 1917 May
- "The Wine Divine" (Words by Inayat Khan). "The Sufi" magazine (London) 1917 October
- Maheboob Khan – Hindustani Songs. Words by Pir'o Murshid Inayad. French words by François de Bretevil. II. Hindou Song to the Soul of the Saint – Genève : Edition Henn, PN A. 521 H., cop. 1924. – 3 S. Kl. Randschaden. Gering gebräunt. Texte in Hindi/Französisch/Englisch.
- Maheboob Khan – Hindustani Songs / Words by Pir'o Murshid Inayad; French words by François de Breteuil. Genève : Edition Henn; London ... : [s.n.]; New York ... : [s.n.], 1924. Nr. 1: Bhajan Hindou (Hindou Love Song) — Nr. 2: Hindou Song to the Soul of the Saint — Nr. 3: Bibhas Hindou — Song to the Sun.
- "Jahanara Begam: En indisk kejsardotter". Butenschøn, Andrea Publication 1927 209 s. pl. mus. (Indian raga in European notation Maheboob Khan and by Nils Larsen).
- Songs of Maheboob Khan – 1. Before You Judge 2. Thy Wish 3. You Are My Life 4. Every Breath in Thy Thought 5. Turn Me Not Away 6. Kalyan. Lyrics words from the book 'Gayan, Vadan, Nirtan' by Inayat Khan; music by Maheboob Khan. Rotterdam: Faiz, PN 1374, cop. 1932.
- Songs by Shaikh-ul-Mashaik Pyaromir Maheboob Khan. 13 original songs for Voice and Piano. Hague, East-West Publications Fonds, 1988 ISBN 90-70104-76-8.

=== CD recordings ===
- "Sufi Songs". Songs composed by Maheboob Khan based on words of Inayat Khan. Ute Döring, mezzo-soprano, and J. van Lohuizen, piano. Recorded and мanufactured in Germany by: CES in 1998.
- "The Sun of Love". Symphonic compositions by Inayat Khan, Maheboob Khan and Hidayat Inayat Khan. Novosibirsk String Quintet. Recorded and manufactured in Russia by SufiMovement.ru in 2004.

== Articles ==
Khan, Shaikh-ul-Mashaikh Maheboob, "Spirituality – The Tuning of the Heart", Toward the One, vol. 4, Spring 2003, pp. 66–68
