= Ali Khan (Sufi) =

Leader of Inayati Sufi order (1881–1958)

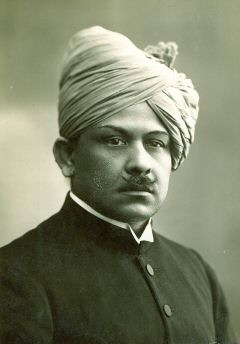
Pir-o-Murshid Ali Khan

Pir-o-Murshid Mohammed Ali Khan (1881–1958) was the leader of the International Sufi Movement from 1948 until his death. He was a second cousin of Inayat Khan, the grandson of Inayat's grandfather and therefore according to Indian custom considered a brother.

Ali Khan was born in Baroda on 7 July 1881 and died on 29 September 1958 in The Hague. He is buried at the Oud Eik en Duinen cemetery in The Hague. On his tombstone his name is written as Pir-o-Murshid Mohammad Ali Khan. Ali Khan apart from Indian classical music, received training in European music, and played the trumpet trombone and bagpipes. As a young man, he was also keenly interested in physical culture and wrestling, which, in the words of the biography of Inayat Khan, "prepared him to become an iron wall to stand in support of Inayat against many opposing influences."

In the West, Ali Khan continued his musical career, receiving training in operatic singing from Mme. Emma Nevada, who recognised great potential in his tenor voice, and even appearing on the stage of La Scala.

Ali Khan was believed by some to possess a natural gift of healing, a gift which they say was developed immeasurably through his deep devotion. There are many stories of friends and mureeds receiving help from his touch, his glance, or by prayers and absent healing, but in reply to their thanks he would humbly point to heaven and say, 'Not I. God.'

== Sources ==
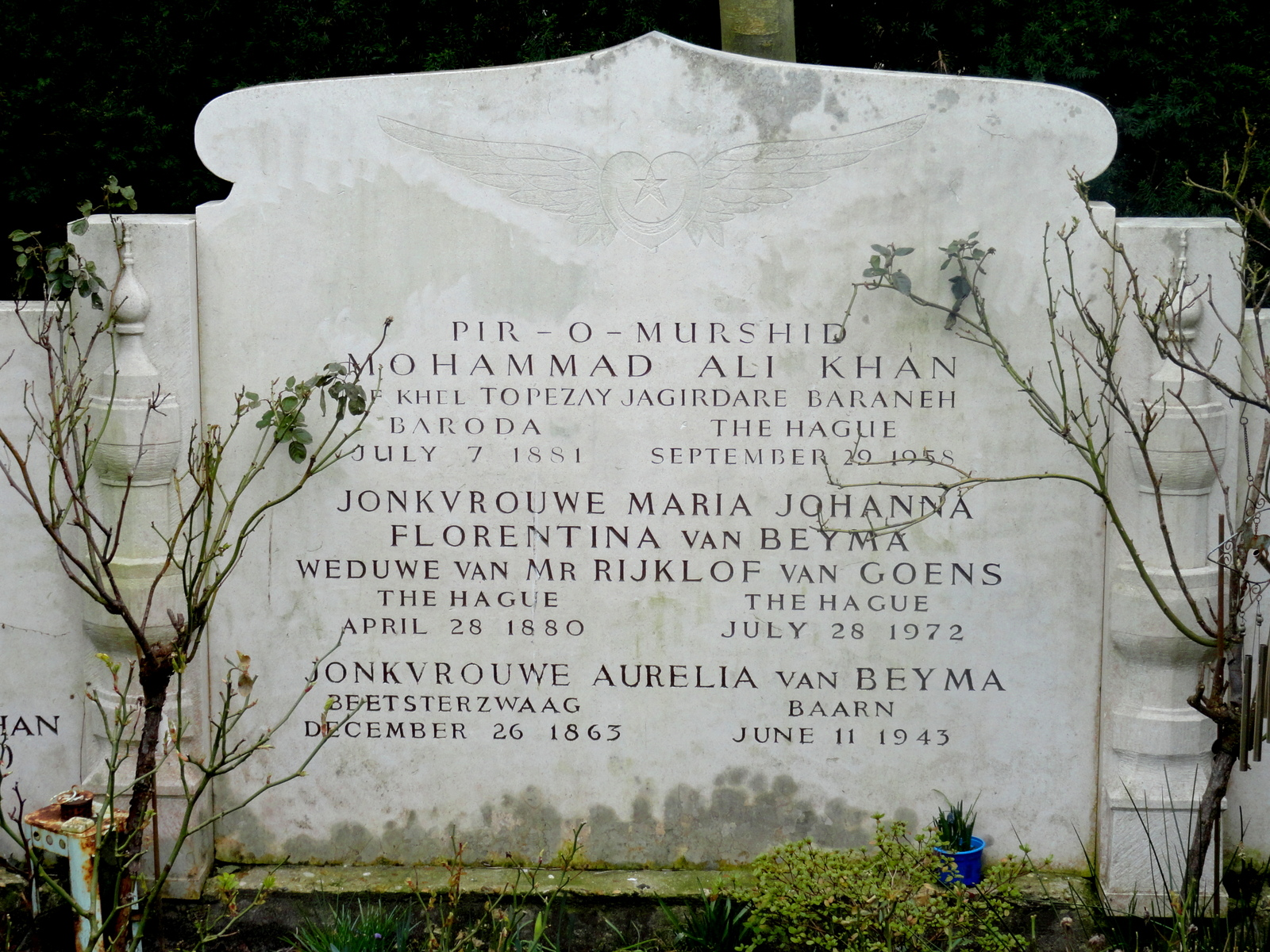
Grave of Pir-o-Murshid Mohammad Ali Khan at Oud Eik en Duinen cemetery in The Hague

- Healing by Murshid Ali Khan. "The Sufi" A Quarterly Journal of Mysticism, Vol. II, No. 2. April 1936 pp. 51–58.
- Inayat Khan by Ronald A. L. Mumtaz Armstrong. Geneva, The Sufi Publishing Association, 1927.
- Hejirat Day by Pir-o-Murshid Md Ali Khan. Geneva, "Sufi Record" volume X, September 1960.
- The Sufi Message and the Sufi Movement by Inayat Khan. 1964 Barrie and Rockliff. London pp. 10.
- Hazrat Inayat Khan a Brief Sketch of His Life and Teaching L. Hayat Bouman. The Hague, East-West Publications Fonds, 1982.
- Musharaff Moulamia Khan. Pages in the lLfe of a Sufi, Den Haag – East West Publications, 1982. 155pp.. ISBN 90-6271-662-8. Third Edition.
