= Friedrich von Frankenberg =

Australian sufi mystic (1889–1950)

- Born: Friedrich Elliot von Frankenburg und Ludwigsdorf; 2 January 1889; Germany
- Died: 1950; Camden, Australia
- Spouse: Olive Pauline Ward Taylor (aka Stella or Lila)
- Parent(s): Jessie Elliot and Friedrich von Frankenberg

Friedrich von Frankenberg (2 January 1889 – 1950), born Friedrich Elliot von Frankenberg and also known as Frederick von Frankenberg and by his Sufi name Sheikh Momin, was one of the early founders of Sufism in Australia. Von Frankenberg studied under Inayat Khan, who first brought this mystical order of Islam to the West, before going on to found the first Sufi society in Australia.

== Early life ==
Friedrich Elliot von Frankenberg und Ludwigsdorf was born in Germany on 2 January 1889, to an aristocratic and cultured family and raised mostly in Germany. His father, Friedrich von Frankenberg, was a German baron of independent means, while his mother, Jessie Elliot, was the daughter of a wealthy Australian industrialist family. Her family owned property in Algeria, where her father resided there for lengthy periods, and the young family spent some time in North Africa. This may be where Von Frankenberg first encountered Islam. He later became an Officer for the German Crown Prince, and developed an interest in collecting rare works on Eastern and Islamic literature.

In 1925 and 1926 he attended the Sufi Movement Summer School, led annually by Inayat Khan at Suresnes, in France. He was accepted by Khan as a student (mureed), and given the Sufi name of Momin (meaning faithful), as well as instruction in spiritual practices.

In 1927, Von Frankenberg immigrated to Australia. His mother had inherited a substantial estate from her father, but it had been frozen during World War I because Elliot and her son were German nationals. He seems to have initially travelled to Australia in order to settle his claim to the family property.

In Australia, he married an Australian woman, Olive Pauline Ward Taylor. She was generally known as Stella, or by her Sufi name of Lila, was an accomplished concert pianist and member of a family in Sydney who ran a successful business. In the 1930s the Von Frankenbergs settled on a dairy farm called "Spring Hills" at Camden, on the outskirts of Sydney, where Von Frankenberg was known locally as "the Baron".

From the 1930s to the end of his life Von Frankenberg worked to spread Sufism in Australia and established and led the first Sufi groups in Australia. During World War II, he came under suspicion from the Australian authorities, due mostly to his German background. He was questioned and his mail was monitored, but he was not interned.

== Death and legacy ==
Von Frankenberg died in 1950 at the age of 61 and was buried in the Camden cemetery.

He left his personal library, a collection of "many rare translations of Muslim, Eastern and other texts he collected in Europe between the 1890s and 1920s", as well as many early Australian editions of works by Inayat Khan, other pamphlets and ephemera that shed light on the early history of Sufism in Australia.

After his death, the small movement that he had founded split, with some members following his student the Australian poet Francis Brabazon into becoming disciples of Meher Baba in Queensland and Dr Karel Frederik Rechlien Jansen (Murshid Sharif), later the National Representative for the Sufi Movement in Australia (SMIA), an affiliate of the International Sufi Movement.

Avatar's Abode is a 40-hectare (99-acre) spiritual retreat about 121 kilometres (75 mi) north of Brisbane, near Woombye, dedicated to Meher Baba, established by Brabazon after purchasing the land with money left to him by Von Frankenberg. Von Frankenberg's library was also willed to Brabazon, and which is included in the collection now kept at Avatar's Abode in the Francis Brabazon Library.

Von Frankenberg was the founder of the first Sufi society in Australia, and had a major impact on the growth of the tradition.
