= Vilayat Inayat Khan =

Mystic of the Inayati Order (1916–2004)

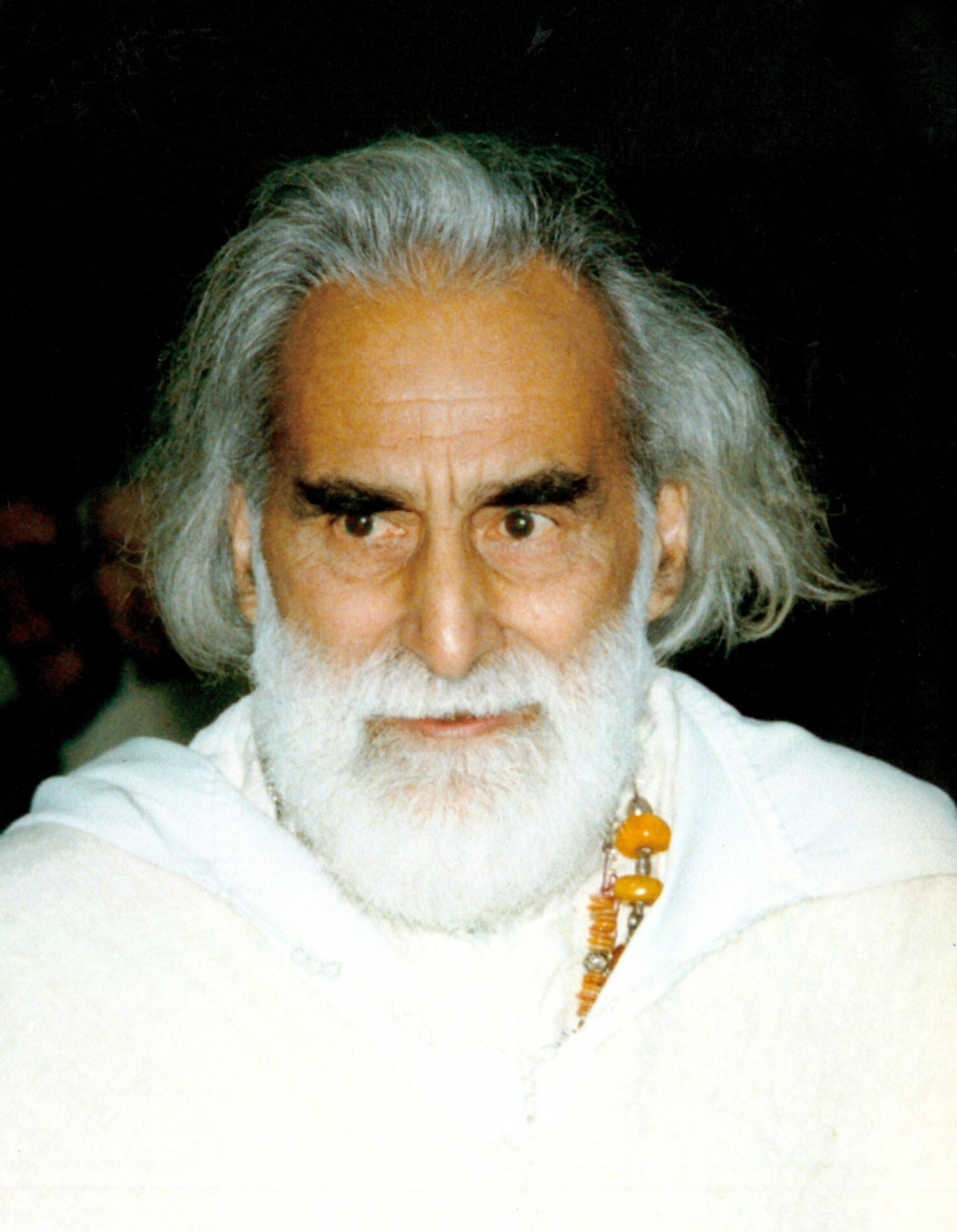

Personal life
- Born: 19 June 1916 London
- Died: 17 June 2004 Suresnes

Senior posting
- Disciples: Doug Kraft

Vilayat Inayat Khan (19 June 1916 – 17 June 2004) was an Indian teacher of meditation and of the traditions of the Chishti Order of Sufism. His teaching derived from the tradition of his father, Inayat Khan, founder of The Sufi Order in the West (now named the Ināyati Order), in a form tailored to the needs of Western seekers. One of his sisters was Noor Inayat Khan GC MBE. He taught in the tradition of Universal Sufism. His parents met at the New York City ashram of American yogi, Pierre Bernard, half-brother of his mother Pirani Ameena Begum.

Prior to his teaching career he worked in London as an assistant to Ghulam Mohammed, the Finance Minister of Pakistan in 1949, and served as a personal assistant to Pakistan Prime Minister Liaquat Ali Khan during his visit to England.

In 1975 he founded The Abode of the Message, which serves as the central residential community of the Sufi Order International, a conference and retreat center, and a center of esoteric study.

Pir Vilayat had two sons (Zia and Mirza) and a daughter, Maria. He choose his eldest son, Zia Inayat Khan to be his successor. Pir Zia is now the head of the Sufi Order International, the name of which he changed to Inayatiyya.

== Legacy ==
During his lifetime Vilayat Inayat Khan was instrumental in the founding of several organisations that continue to operate today.

The Abode of the Message

Hope Project

The Institute for Applied Meditation

Inayatiyya.

== Death ==
Vilayat Inayat Khan died on 17 June 2004, two days before his 88th birthday. His son is Zia Inayat Khan. His Dargah is located in Delhi, India.

== Bibliography ==
- Inayat Khan, Pir Vilayat (2014) The Ecstasy Beyond Knowing: A Manual of Meditation. NY. Omega Publications ISBN 1941810012.
- Inayat Khan, Pir Vilayat (2011) Life is a Pilgrimage. NY. Omega Publications ISBN 0930872819.
- Inayat Khan, Pir Vilayat (1974). Toward the One. New York: Harper and Row. ISBN 978-0-06-090352-7.
- Inayat Khan, Pir Vilayat (1978). The Message in Our Time: The Life and Teaching of the Sufi Master, Pir-O-Murshid Inayat Khan. San Francisco: Harper and Row. ISBN 978-0-06-064237-2.
- Inayat Khan, Pir Vilayat (1978). "Front matter: Forward". In Khan, Hazrat Inayat (ed.). The Complete Sayings of Hazrat Inayat Khan. New Lebanon, NY: Sufi Order Publications. ISBN 978-0-930872-02-1.
- Inayat Khan, Pir Vilayat (1981). The Call of the Dervish. Santa Fe, NM: Sufi Order Publications. ISBN 978-0-930872-26-7.
- Inayat Khan, Pir Vilayat (1982). Introducing Spirituality Into Counseling and Therapy. Santa Fe, NM: Omega Press. ISBN 978-0-930872-30-4.
- Inayat Khan, Pir Vilayat (1994). That Which Transpires Behind That Which Appears. NY: Omega Publications. ISBN 978-0-930872-49-6.
- Inayat Khan, Pir Vilayat (1999). Awakening: A Sufi Experience. New York, NY: J.P. Tarcher/Putnam. ISBN 978-1-58542-038-4.
- Inayat Khan, Pir Vilayat (2003). In Search of the Hidden Treasure: A Conference of Sufis. New York: J.P. Tarcher/Putnam. ISBN 978-1-58542-180-0.
