= Association for Neuro Linguistic Programming =

UK non-profit organization (1985–present)

The Association for Neuro-Linguistic Programming (ANLP) is a UK organisation founded in 1985 by Frank Kevlin to promote neuro-linguistic programming (NLP). Since 2005, it has been led by Karen Moxom.

The ANLP publishes Rapport, a quarterly magazine, and has hosted NLP conferences. It was a member organisation of the United Kingdom Council for Psychotherapy (UKCP) until 2002, when the role was taken over by its daughter organization, the Neuro Linguistic Psychotherapy and Counselling Association (NLPtCA). The NLPtCA is a founder member of the European Association for Neuro-Linguistic Psychotherapy, a European wide accrediting organisation (EWAO) for NLPt within the European Association for Psychotherapy (EAP).
