= Hidayat Inayat Khan =

Musician and mystic of the Inayati Order (1917–2016)

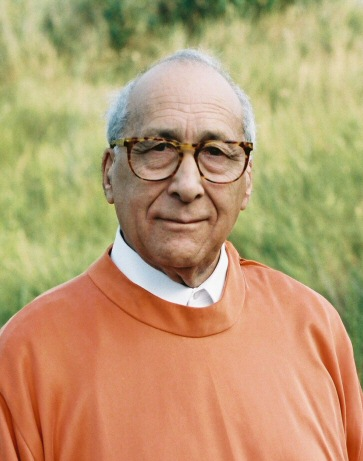
Hidayat Inayat-Khan

Hidayat Inayat Khan (Urdu: هدايت عنایت خان; 6 August 1917 – 12 September 2016) was a British-French classical composer, conductor and Representative-General of the Inayati Order.

== Biography ==
Hidayat was born in London to Sufi Master Inayat Khan and Pirani Ameena Begum; brother of Noor Inayat Khan, Vilayat Inayat Khan and Khair-un-Nisa (Claire) Inayat Khan; and father of Fazal Inayat-Khan, who led the Inayati Order from 1968 to 1982. His Western musical education began in Paris in 1932 at the Ecole Normale de Musique, in the violin class of Bernard Sinsheimer; the composition class of Nadia Boulanger; and the orchestra class of Diran Alexanian. Later, he attended chamber music courses given by the Lener Quartet in Budapest.

In 1942, Hidayat Inayat Khan became Professor of Music at the Lycée Musical de Dieulefit, France, and later, in the Netherlands, joined the orchestra of Haarlem as violinist. He followed the courses of orchestra conducting by Toon Verhey. In 1952, Hidayat Inayat Khan conducted the orchestra of 's-Hertogenbosch for the worldwide broadcasting of his Po'me en Fa for orchestra and piano and in the same year, founded his first chamber music orchestra ensemble. Performance highlights in Hidayat Inayat Khan's professional life include the playing, on 4 May 1957, of his Zikar Symphony at Salle Pleyel, Paris, conducted by Georges Prêtre, in a Pasdeloup concert. On the occasion of Mahatma Gandhi's centenary, on 21 November 1969, the Gandhi Symphony was played in a special concert organised by UNESCO in the Netherlands. This was repeated in 1971 during a broadcasting of "The Voice of America", as well as on the United Nations Radio in the USA and was later recorded by the US Armed Forces Radio Stations in a worldwide Carmen Dragon show. On 15 October 1971, the Virginia Symphonic Poem was played in honour of the Bicentennial of America. On Bavarian Radio La Monotonia was played in a Composer's Portrait in 1972 and the Message Symphony was played in 1977.

On 15–16 February 2002, the Suite Symphonic and La Monotonia, Op. 7 for Orchestra were performed by the Symphonisches Orchester München-Andechs with Andreas Pascal Heinzmann conducting in Munich, Germany. On 5 May 2007, the Royal Legend Symphonic Poem Op. 46 will receive its world premiere in Munich. It will be performed by the Zorneding-Baldham Orchestra with Andreas Pascal Heinzmann conducting. He has composed numerous works, among them Concerto for strings Op. 38, Quartet for Strings Op. 45, Poem in F, and a number of choral pieces including Chanson Exotique, Awake for Morning, and a collection of Sufi hymns. He is a founding member of the European Composers' Union, and his music has frequently been broadcast internationally. Besides his symphonic works Hidayat Inayat Khan has written choral compositions, Sufi songs and hymns as well as chamber music. Many of his compositions are now available on CD. His research in music could be described as a cross-point between eastern monophony and western polyphony; respecting western harmonic structures while also expressing the inspiring flavour of eastern ragas. In 1988, he assumed the role of Representative-General of The Sufi Movement International and Pir-o-Murshid of its Inner School.

== Music ==
- Nous vous invitons à la Prière and other compositions and Sufi songs of Hidayat Inayat Khan – smaller compositions for voice, instrument, quartet. Mirasound Classics 399277 Holland 1997 ASIN: B0002NBLQC.
- Symphonic Works. Hidayat Inayat Khan. "Sound of Light", Banff, Canada 1999 Double CD, total time 108 min. ASIN: B000LE1A04.
- Message from the Heart. Hidayat Inayat Khan – extracts from his symphonic works, Oreade Music 2000, Haarlem. ORS 59622. CD total time 52:16 ASIN: B00004U0Y3.
- Suite Symphonique Op. 7 by Hidayat Inayat Khan – Live in Munich 2002. Symphonisches Orchester München-Andechs – Conductor Andreas Pascal Heinzmann (also in the concert: Symphonie Nr. 1 C.Moll von J. Brahms).
- Monotonia. Mystery. Hidayat Inayat Khan. CJ Music 2003. Novosibirsk (Russia) CD, total time 68:30.
- Ballet Rituel Op. 17 Hidayat Inayat Khan – Live 19. Juli 2003 in München. Symphonisches Orchester München-Andechs – Conductor Andreas Pascal Heinzmann (also in the concert: Rhapsodie von Rachmaninov, Symphonie Nr. 2 D-Dur von J. Brahms).
- The Singing Zikar of Hazrat Inayat Khan composed by Inayat Khan, arranged by Hidayat Inayat Khan, performed and published by Jelaluddin Gary Sill (CD) (1987).

== Books ==
- Sufi Teachings: Lectures from Lake O'Hara by Hidayat Inayat Khan. Publisher: Ekstasis Editions (15 August 1996), 120 pages, ISBN 0-921215-66-5,.
- The Inner School: Esoteric Sufi Teachings by Hidayat Inayat Khan. Publisher: Ekstasis Editions (15 August 1997) ISBN 0-921215-98-3 Google Books.
- Reflections on the Art of Personality by Hidayat Inayat Khan. 128 pages Publisher: Ekstasis Editions (25 December 2001) ISBN 1-894800-01-X Google Books.
- Once Upon a Time. Early Days Stories About My Beloved Father and Mother by Hidayat Inayat Khan. 2002.
- Reflections on Philosophy, Psychology and Mysticism: Contemplations on Sufi Teachings by Hidayat Inayat Khan. Ekstasis Editions (2003) 96 pages, ISBN 1-894800-44-3 Google Books.
- Reflections on Inner Sufi Teachings by Hidayat Inayat Khan. Ekstasis Editions (2006) 120 pages, ISBN 1-894800-58-3 Google Books.
- Reflections on Spiritual Liberty by Hidayat Inayat Khan. Ekstasis Editions (15 October 2007) 122 pages, ISBN 1-897430-14-0.
- Spiritual Liberty by Hidayat Inayat Khan. Readworthy Publications (1 April 2011) 180 pages, ISBN 9789350180099.
- Sufi Message of Unity of Religious Ideals by Hidayat Inayat Khan. Readworthy Publications (3 April 2012) 102 pages.

in German language:

- Eine Fackel in der Dunkelheit von Hidayat Inayat Khan Heilbronn Verlag (1997) ISBN 3-923000-86-3.
- Geistige Freiheit von Hidayat Inayat Khan. Petama Project Verlag, 185 pages, ISBN 3-907643-00-3.
- Es war einmal ... von Hidayat Inayat Khan. Heilbronn Verlag (1998) 88 pages, ISBN 3-923000-91-X.

in Greek language:

- Η εσωτερική σχολή (i esoteriki scholi) by Hidayat Inayat Khan. Kyveli (2005) ISBN 9606630021.
- Το βιβλίο της υγείας (To vivlio tis ygeias) by Hidayat Inayat Khan. Pyrinos Kosmos (1997) ISBN 9604300202.
- I dimiourgiki fysi ton doniseon kai i dynami tou logou by Hidayat Inayat Khan. Pyrinos Kosmos (1994) ISBN 9607327772.

in French language:

- Le Sentier du Souvenir: Enseignements sur le Zikar Chanté de Hazrat Inayat Khan. Petama Project (2009) ISBN 3907643089.

in Russian language:

- Sufi Teachings: Pir-o-Murshid Hidayat Inayat-Khan ("Учение Суфиев Пир-о-Муршида Хадайят Инайят Хана") Publisher: Novosibirsk (2002), 148 pages.

== Video ==
- Hidayat Inayat Khan's "La Monotonia", choreography by Peter Leung of the Het Nationale Ballet, and danced by Maria Sascha Khan, and Wieslaw Dudek (Staatsballett Berlin) 2007. Video on YouTube.
- Hidayat Inayat Khan – Interview for television program "Chai Time" (Vancouver). Video on YouTube.
- Hidayat Inayat Khan Monotonia from Concerto for strings op 48. Novosibirsk. 13 September 2010. Novosibirsk String Quintet: Oganes Girunian, violin; Alexander Kasheev, violin; Ilya Tarasenko, viola; Stanislav Ovchinnikov, cello; Viktor Murashov, contrabass. Video on YouTube.

== Audio books ==
- The Wisdom of the Sufis: A Dialogue Between Hidayat Inayat Khan and Deepak Chopra, (Dialogues at the Chopra Center for Well Being) (Audio Cassette) Hay House Audio Books (February 2000) ISBN 1-56170-734-1.
