= African Nutrition Leadership Programme =

- Abbreviation: ANLP
- Formation: 2002
- Purpose: Development of future leaders in the field of human nutrition in Africa
- Headquarters: North-West University
- Location: Potchefstroom, South Africa
- Region served: Africa
- Official language: English
- Director: Johann Jerling
- Website: African Nutrition Leadership Programme

The African Nutrition Leadership Programme (ANLP) is a 10 days training course that started in 2002 to assist the development of future leaders in the field of human nutrition in Africa. The emphasis of the programme is on understanding and developing the qualities and skills of leaders, team building, communication and understanding nutrition information in a broader context. The long-term aim of the ANLP is to meet the demands for leadership in Africa to solve its nutritional challenges.

The programme is designed for individuals who have experience in various fields of nutrition. Preference will be given to candidates with a postgraduate qualification, postdoctoral fellows and candidates with comparable working experience in the broader human nutrition science, studying or working in Africa.

== Vision ==
The ANLP is a leadership development and networking seminar aimed at assisting the development of future leaders in the field of human nutrition in Africa. Emphasis is placed on understanding the qualities and skills of leaders, team building, communication and nutrition information in a broader context, and to understanding the role of nutrition science in the world around us.

== Modules ==
- Leadership
- Communication
- Self-awareness
- Social responsibility
- Advocacy

== Location ==
The course is held each year at Elgro River Lodge, Free State, South Africa.

== Delegates ==
Each year, an average of 30 candidates from all around Africa participate to the ANLP.
