= Noor Inayat Khan =

WW2 SOE British agent (1914–1944)

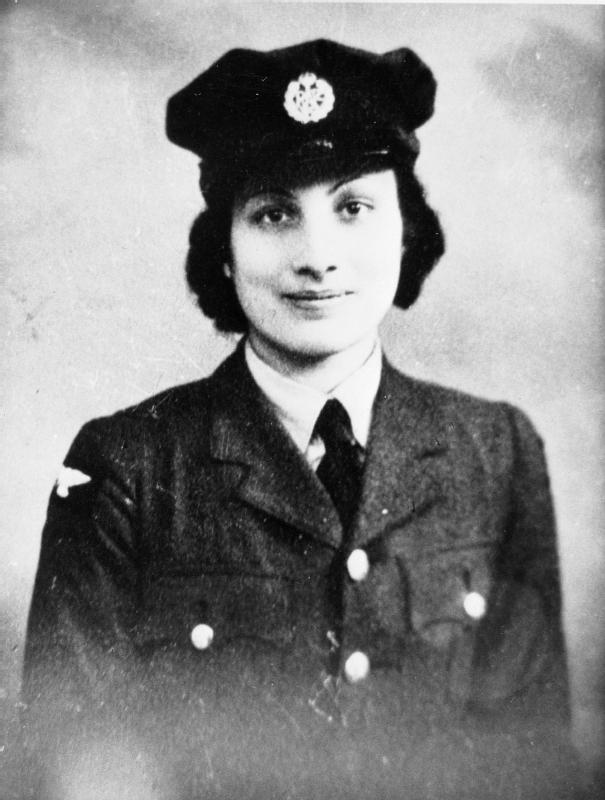
- Noor-un-Nisa Inayat Khan, c. 1943
- Born: 1 January 1914; Moscow, Russian Empire
- Died: 13 September 1944 (aged 30); Dachau concentration camp, Bavaria, Nazi Germany
- Other names: Nora Baker; Madeleine (SOE codename); Nurse (SOE callsign); Jeanne-Marie Renier (SOE alias)
- Military career
- Allegiance: United Kingdom
- Branch: Women's Auxiliary Air Force; Special Operations Executive
- Service years: 1940–1944
- Rank: Assistant section officer
- Unit: Cinema (SOE)
- Conflicts: Second World War
- Awards: George Cross; Mentioned in Despatches; Croix de Guerre 1939–1945 (France)

Noor-un-Nisa Inayat Khan, GC (1 January 1914 – 13 September 1944), also known as Nora Inayat-Khan and Nora Baker, was a British-Indian agent in France in the Second World War who served in the Special Operations Executive (SOE). The purpose of SOE was to conduct espionage, sabotage, and reconnaissance in countries occupied by the Axis powers, especially those occupied by Nazi Germany.

As an SOE agent under the codename Madeleine she became the first female wireless operator to be sent from the UK into occupied France to aid the French Resistance during the Second World War. Inayat Khan was betrayed, captured, and executed at Dachau concentration camp. She was posthumously awarded the George Cross for her service, the highest civilian decoration for gallantry in the United Kingdom.

== Early life ==
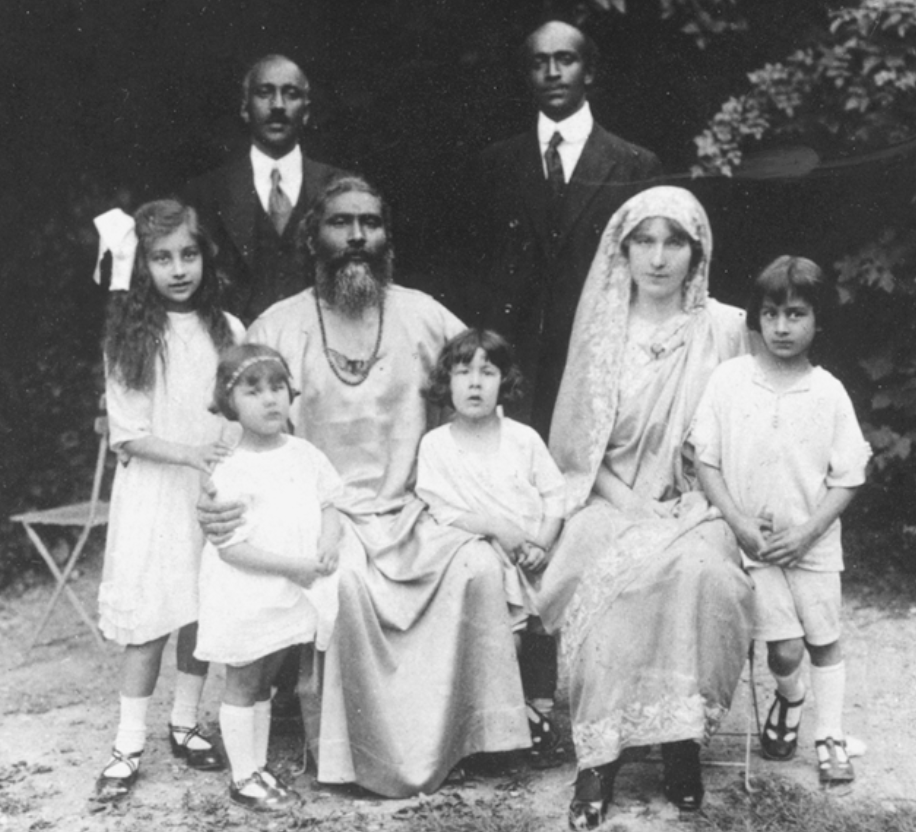
Khan family photo before 1930

Noor Inayat Khan was born on 1 January 1914, in Moscow. She was the eldest of four children. Her siblings were Vilayat Inayat Khan, an author and Sufi teacher; Hidayat Inayat Khan, a composer and Sufi teacher; and Khair-un-Nisa Inayat Khan.

Her father, Inayat Khan, was born in Baroda, Bombay Presidency, and came from a family of Indian Muslims with hereditary nobles and classical musicians among both sides of his ancestors. Inayat Khan's great-great-grandfather was Tipu Sultan, the ruler of Mysore. Inayat Khan lived in Europe as a musician and a teacher of Sufism.

Her mother, Pirani Ameena Begum (born Ora Ray Baker), was an American from Albuquerque, New Mexico, who had met Inayat Khan during his travels in the United States. (Note: Ora Baker was the half-sister of American yogi and scholar Pierre Bernard, her guardian at the time that she met Inayat. Claims that Ora Ray Baker was related to Christian Science founder Mary Baker Eddy require corroboration.) Afterwards, Vilayat became head of the Sufi Order of the West, later the Sufi Order International, and now the Inayati Order.

In 1914, shortly before the outbreak of the First World War, the family left Russia for Britain, and lived in the Bloomsbury neighborhood of London. Noor attended nursery in Notting Hill. In 1920, the family moved to France, settling in Suresnes near Paris, in a house that was a gift from a benefactor of the Sufi movement. As a young girl, Noor was described as quiet, shy, sensitive, and dreamy. After the death of her father in 1927, 13-year-old Noor took on the responsibility for her younger siblings from her grief-stricken mother. She studied child psychology at the Sorbonne, and also music at the Paris Conservatory under Nadia Boulanger, composing for both harp and piano.

As a young woman, Noor began a career as a writer, publishing her poetry and children's stories in English and French and becoming a regular contributor to children's magazines and French radio. In 1939, her book Twenty Jataka Tales, inspired by the Jataka tales of Buddhist tradition, was published in London by George G. Harrap and Co.

During the Second World War, when France was conquered by Nazi Germany, the family fled to Bordeaux and then by sea to Britain, landing at Falmouth, Cornwall, on 22 June 1940. Initially they stayed in Southampton, at the parental home of the philosopher Basil Mitchell. (Note: Mitchell's father had been an early disciple of Noor's father.)

== Women's Auxiliary Air Force ==
Although Noor was deeply influenced by pacifist ideals, she and her brother Vilayat decided they wanted to help defeat Nazi tyranny: "I wish some Indians would win high military distinction in this war. If one or two could do something in the Allied service which was very brave and which everybody admired it would help to make a bridge between the English people and the Indians."

In November 1940, Noor joined the Women's Auxiliary Air Force (WAAF) and, as an Aircraftwoman 2nd Class, was sent to be trained as a wireless operator. Upon assignment to a bomber training school in June 1941, she applied for a commission in an effort to relieve herself of the boring work there.

== Special Operations Executive ==
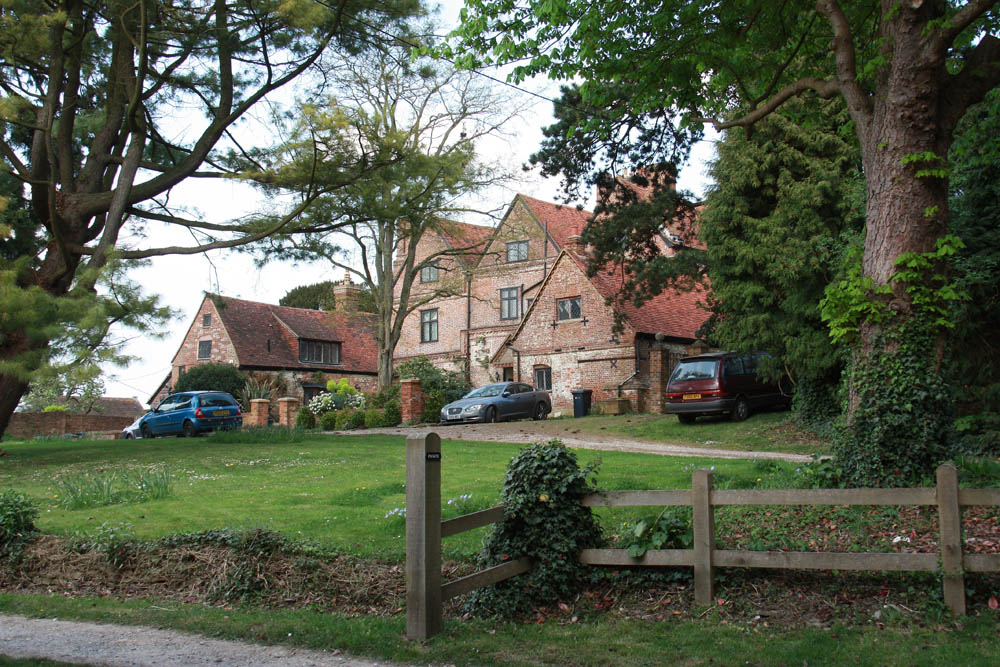
Wanborough Manor

Later, Noor Inayat Khan was recruited to join F (France) Section of the Special Operations Executive; and in early February 1943 she was posted to the Air Ministry, Directorate of Air Intelligence, seconded to the First Aid Nursing Yeomanry (FANY). She was sent to Wanborough Manor, near Guildford in Surrey, after which she was ordered to Aylesbury, in Buckinghamshire, for special training as a wireless operator in occupied territory.

She was the first woman to be sent over in such a capacity, as all the woman agents before her had been sent as couriers. Having had previous wireless telegraphy (W/T) training, Noor had an edge on those who were just beginning their radio training, and was considered both fast and accurate.

From Aylesbury, Noor went on to Beaulieu, where the security training was capped with a practice mission – in the case of wireless operators, to find a place in a strange city from which they could transmit back to their instructors without being detected by an agent unknown to them who would be shadowing them.

The ultimate training exercise was the mock Gestapo interrogation, intended to give agents a taste of what might be in store for them if they were captured, and some practice in maintaining their cover story. Noor's escaping officer found her interrogation "almost unbearable" and reported that "she seemed terrified … so overwhelmed she nearly lost her voice", and that afterwards, "she was trembling and quite blanched." Her final report (Note: Her final evaluation report was found in her personal file long after the war by the official historian of F Section.) read: "Not overburdened with brains but has worked hard and shown keenness, apart from some dislike of the security side of the course. She has an unstable and temperamental personality and it is very doubtful whether she is really suited to work in the field." Next to this comment, Maurice Buckmaster, the head of F Section, had written in the margin "Nonsense" and that "We don't want them overburdened with brains."

Noor's superiors held mixed opinions on her suitability for secret warfare, and her training was incomplete due to the need to get trained W/T operators into the field. Khan's "childlike" qualities, particularly her gentle manner and "lack of ruse", had greatly worried her instructors at SOE's training schools. One instructor wrote that "she confesses that she would not like to have to do anything 'two faced'", while another said she was "very feminine in character, very eager to please, very ready to adapt herself to the mood of the company; the one of the conversation, capable of strong attachments, kind hearted, emotional, imaginative." A further observer said: "Tends to give far too much information. Came here without the foggiest idea what she was being trained for." Others later commented that she was physically unsuited, saying she would not easily disappear into a crowd.

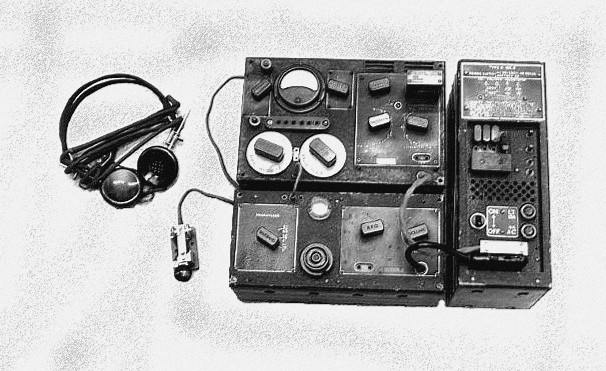
B MK II receiver and transmitter—the B2 radio set)

Physically quite small in stature, Noor received poor athletic reports from her instructors: "Can run very well but otherwise clumsy. Unsuitable for jumping" "Pretty scared of weapons but tries hard to get over it." Noor was training as a W/T operator, and in that field she was getting quite adequate reports. Her "fist", or style of tapping the keys, was somewhat heavy, apparently owing to her fingers being swollen by chilblains, but her speed was improving every day. Khan, who played the harp, was a natural signaller like many talented musicians.

Further, Vera Atkins (the intelligence officer for F Section) insisted Noor's commitment was unquestioned, as another training report had readily confirmed: "She felt she had come to a dead end in the WAAF, and was longing to do something more active in the prosecution of the war, something that would demand more sacrifice." So when Suttill's request first came, Vera saw Noor as a natural choice, and although her final training in field security and encoding had to be cut short, she judged her ready to go.

Noor's mission would be an especially dangerous one. So successful had female couriers been that the decision was made to use them as wireless operators as well, which was even more dangerous work, probably the most dangerous work of all. The job of the operator was to maintain a link between the circuit in the field and London, sending and receiving messages about planned sabotage operations or about where arms were needed for resistance fighters. Without such communication it was almost impossible for any resistance strategy to be co-ordinated, but the operators were highly vulnerable to detection which was improving as the war progressed.

Hiding themselves as best they could, with aerials strung up in attics or disguised as washing lines, they tapped out Morse on the key of transmitters, and would often wait alone for hours for a reply saying the messages had been received. If they stayed on the air transmitting for more than 20 minutes, their signals were likely to be picked up by the enemy, and detection vans would trace the source of these suspect signals. When the operator moved location, the bulky transmitter had to be carried, sometimes concealed in a suitcase or in a bundle of firewood. If stopped and searched, the operator would have no cover story to explain the transmitter. In 1943, an operator's life expectancy was six weeks.

Noor had been staying at a country house in Buckinghamshire, a place where agents had a final chance to adjust to their new identities and consider their missions before departure. Noor's conducting officer, a female companion who watched over agents in training, told Atkins that Noor had descended into a gloom and was clearly troubled by the thought of what she was about to undertake. Then two fellow agents staying with Noor at the country house wrote directly to Atkins to say they felt she should not go. Such an intervention at this stage was most unusual.

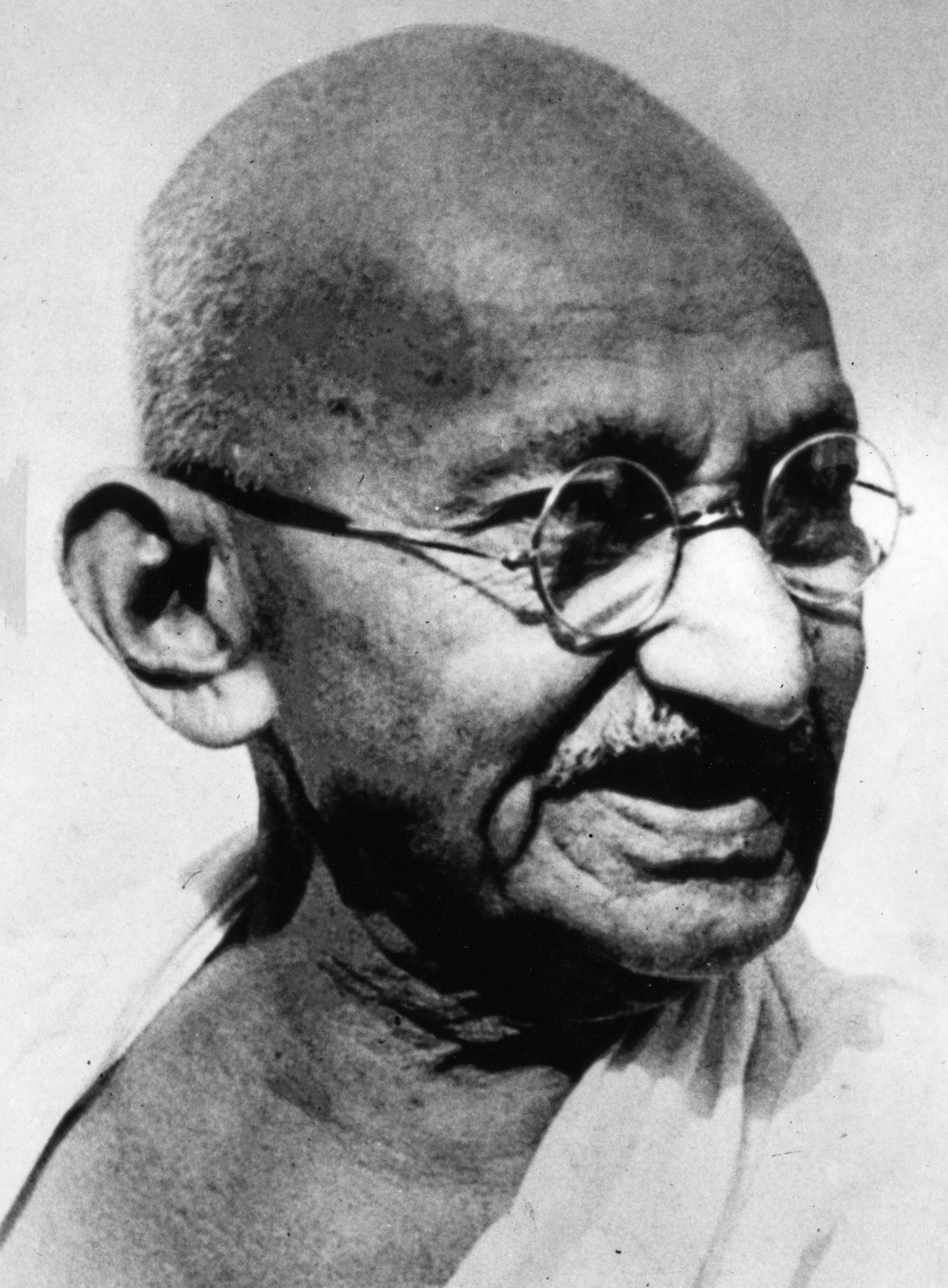
Inayat Khan was taught to respect Gandhi's nonviolent philosophy.

Atkins decided to call Noor back to London, to meet and talk. Vilayat remembered trying to stop his sister going on her mission exactly at the time of this meeting. "You see, Nora and I had been brought up with the policy of Gandhi's nonviolence, and at the outbreak of war we discussed what we would do", said Vilayat, who had followed his father and become a Sufi mystic. "She said, 'Well, I must do something, but I don't want to kill anyone.' So I said, 'Well, if we are going to join the war, we have to involve ourselves in the most dangerous positions, which would mean no killing.' Then, when we eventually go to England, I volunteered for minesweeping and she volunteered for SOE, and so I have always had a feeling of guilt because of what I said that day."

Noor and Atkins met at Manetta's, a restaurant in Mayfair. Atkins wanted to confirm that Noor believed in her own ability to succeed. Confidence was the most important thing for any agent. However poor Noor's jumping or even her encoding, Atkins believed those agents who did well were those who knew before they set off that they could do the job. Her intention was to let Noor feel she had an opportunity to back out gracefully should she so wish. Atkins began by asking if she was happy in what she was doing. Noor looked startled and said: "Yes, of course."

Atkins then told her about the letter and its contents. Noor was reportedly upset that anybody would think she was unfit. "You know that if you have any doubts, it is not too late to turn back… If you don't feel you're the type – if for any reason whatever you don't want to go you only have to tell me now. I'll arrange everything so that you have no embarrassment. You will be transferred to another branch of the service with no adverse mark on your file. We have every respect for the man or woman who admits frankly to not feeling up to it", Atkins told her, adding: "For us there is only one crime: to go out there and let your comrades down."

Noor insisted adamantly that she wanted to go and was competent for the work. Her only concern, she said, was her family, and Vera sensed immediately that this was, as she had suspected, where the problem lay. Noor had found saying goodbye to her widowed mother the most painful thing she had ever had to do, she said. As Vera had advised her, she had told her mother only half the truth: she had said she was going abroad, but to Africa, and she had found maintaining the deception cruel.

Atkins asked if there was anything she could do to help with family matters. Noor said that, should she go missing, she would like Atkins to avoid worrying her mother as far as possible. The normal procedure, as Noor knew, was that when an agent went to the field, Vera would send out periodic "good news" letters to the family, letting them know the person concerned was well. If the agent went missing, the family would be told so. What Noor was suggesting was that bad news should be broken to her mother only if it was beyond any doubt that she was dead. Atkins said she would agree to this arrangement if it was what she wanted. With this assurance Noor seemed content and confident once more. Any doubts in Atkins's mind were also now apparently settled.

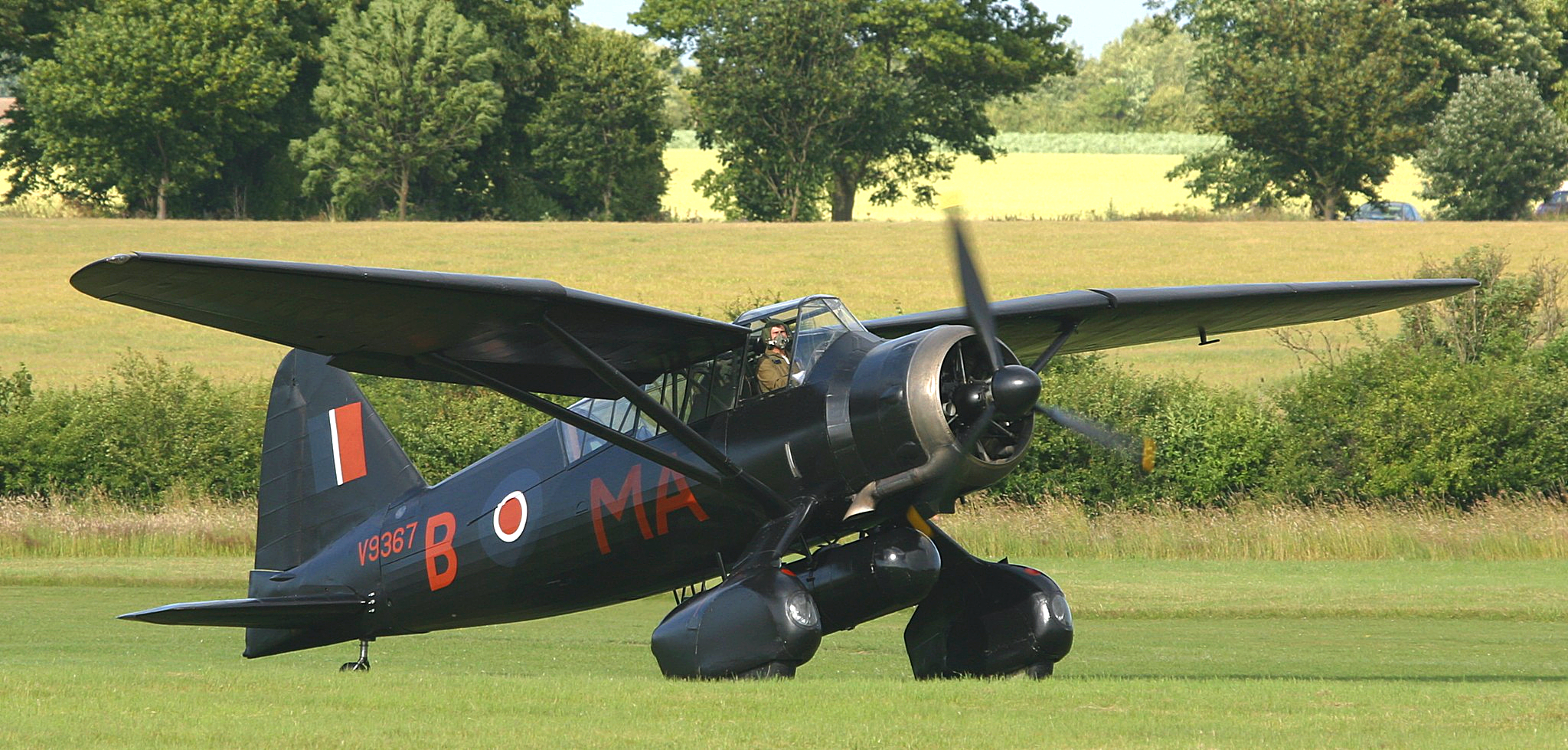
Westland Lysander Mk III (SD), the type used for special missions into occupied France during the Second World War.

Atkins always accompanied the woman agents to the departure airfields, if she possibly could. Those who were not dropped into France by parachute (as were agents like Andrée Borrel and Lise de Baissac) were flown in on Lysanders, a light mono wing transport aircraft designed to land on short and rough fields. These planes were met by a "reception committee" consisting of SOE agents and local French helpers. The reception committees were alerted to the imminent arrival of a plane by a BBC action message inserted as a message personnel; these were broadcast across France every evening, mostly for ordinary listeners wishing to contact friends or family separated by war. The messages broadcast for SOE, agreed in advance between HQ and the circuit organiser, usually by wireless signal, sounded like odd greetings or aphorisms – "Le hibou n'est pas un éléphant" (The owl is not an elephant) – but the reception committee on the ground would know that the message meant a particular (pre-planned) operation would take place.

Promoted to Assistant Section Officer (the WAAF equivalent of RAF pilot officer), Noor was to fly by Lysander with the June moon to a field near Angers, from where she would make her way to Paris to link up with the leader of a Prosper sub-circuit named Emile Garry, or Cinema, an alias chosen because of his uncanny resemblance to the film star Gary Cooper. Once on the ground Noor would make contact with the Prosper circuit organiser, Francis Suttill, and take on her new persona as a children's nurse, "Jeanne-Marie Renier", using fake papers in that name. To her SOE colleagues, however, she would be known simply as "Madeleine".

Regardless of her perceived shortcomings, Noor's fluent French and her competency in wireless operation – coupled with a shortage of experienced agents – made her a desirable candidate for service in Nazi-occupied France. On 16/17 June 1943, cryptonymed 'Madeleine'/W/T operator 'Nurse' and under the cover identity of Jeanne-Marie Regnier, Assistant Section Officer Noor was flown to landing ground B/20A 'Indigestion' in Northern France on a night landing double Lysander operation, code named Teacher/Nurse/Chaplain/Monk, along with agents Diana Rowden (code named Paulette/Chaplain), and Cecily Lefort (code named Alice/Teacher). They were met by Henri Déricourt.

== Capture and imprisonment ==
From 24 June 1943 the 'Prosper' network that Noor had been sent to be a radio operator for began to be rounded up by the Germans. Noor remained in radio contact with London. When Buckmaster told her she would be flown home, she told him she would prefer to remain, as she believed she was the only radio operator remaining in Paris. Buckmaster agreed to this, though she was told only to receive signals, not to transmit.

Noor Inayat Khan was betrayed to the Germans, possibly by Renée Garry. Garry was the sister of Émile Henri Garry, the head agent of the 'Cinema' and 'Phono' circuits, and Inayat Khan's organiser in the Cinema network (later renamed Phono). Émile Henri Garry was later arrested and executed at Buchenwald in September 1944.

Renée Garry was allegedly paid 100,000 francs (some sources state 500 pounds). Her actions have been attributed at least partially to Garry's suspicion that she had lost the affections of SOE agent France Antelme to Noor. After the war, she was tried but escaped conviction by one vote.

On or around 13 October 1943, Noor was arrested and interrogated at the SD Headquarters at 84 Avenue Foch in Paris. During that time, she attempted escape twice. Hans Kieffer, the former head of the SD in Paris, testified after the war that she did not give the Gestapo a single piece of information, but lied consistently.

However, other sources indicate that Noor chatted amiably with an out-of-uniform Alsatian interrogator, and provided personal details which enabled the SD to answer random checks in the form of questions about her childhood and family.

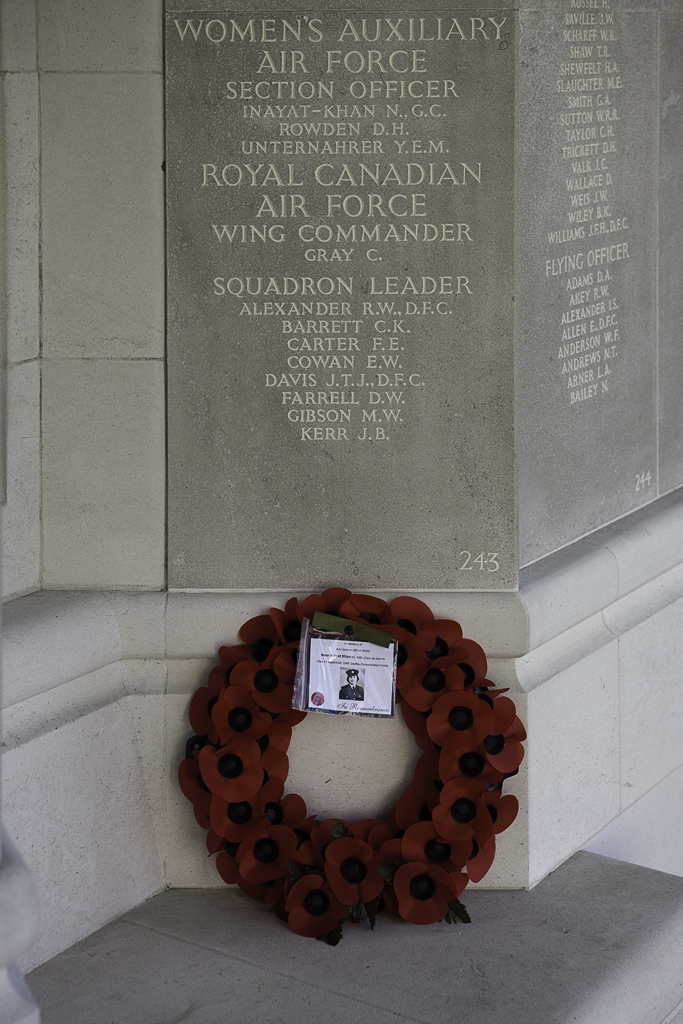
Inayat Khan's inscription at the Air Forces Memorial at Runnymede, England, memorialising those without a known grave

Noor did not talk about her activities under interrogation but the SD found her notebooks. Contrary to security regulations, Noor had copied out all the messages she had sent as an SOE operative (this may have been due to her misunderstanding what a reference to filing meant in her orders, and also the truncated nature of her security course due to the need to insert her into France as soon as possible). Although Noor refused to reveal any secret codes, the Germans gained enough information from them to continue sending false messages imitating her.

Some claim London failed to properly investigate anomalies which would have indicated the transmissions were sent under enemy control, in particular the change in the 'fist' (the style of the operator's Morse transmission). As a WAAF signaller, Noor had been nicknamed "Bang Away Lulu" because of her distinctively heavy-handed style, which was said to be a result of chilblains. However, according to M.R.D. Foot, the Sicherheitsdienst (SD) were quite adept at faking operators' fists. The well-organised and skillful counter-espionage work of the SD under Hans Josef Kieffer is, in fact, the true reason for the intelligence failures.

Additionally, Déricourt, F Section's air-landing officer in France, literally gave SOE's secrets to the SD in Paris. He would later claim to have been working for the Secret Intelligence Service (SIS, commonly known as MI6), without the knowledge of SOE, as part of a complex deception plan in the run-up to D-Day.

As a result, however, three more agents sent to France were captured by the Germans at their parachute landing, including Madeleine Damerment, who was later executed. Sonya Olschanezky ('Tania'), a locally recruited SOE agent, had learnt of Noor's arrest and sent a message to London through her fiancé, Jacques Weil, telling Baker Street of her capture and warning HQ to suspect any transmissions from "Madeleine".

Colonel Maurice Buckmaster ignored the message as unreliable because he did not know who Olschanezky was. As a result, German transmissions from Noor's radio continued to be treated as genuine, leading to the unnecessary deaths of SOE agents, including Olschanezky herself, who was executed at Natzweiler-Struthof concentration camp on 6 July 1944. When Vera Atkins investigated the deaths of missing SOE agents, she initially confused Noor with Olschanezky (they were similar in appearance), who was unknown to her, believing Noor had been killed at Natzweiler, correcting the record only when she learned of Noor's fate at Dachau.

On 25 November 1943, Noor escaped from the SD Headquarters, along with fellow SOE agent John Renshaw Starr and resistance leader Léon Faye, but was recaptured in the vicinity. There was an air raid alert as they escaped across the roof. Regulations required a count of prisoners at such times and their escape was discovered before they could get away. After refusing to sign a declaration renouncing future escape attempts, Noor was taken to Germany on 27 November 1943 "for safe custody" and imprisoned at Pforzheim in solitary confinement as a "Nacht und Nebel" ("Night and Fog": condemned to "Disappearance without Trace") prisoner, in complete secrecy. For ten months, she was kept there, shackled at her hands and feet.

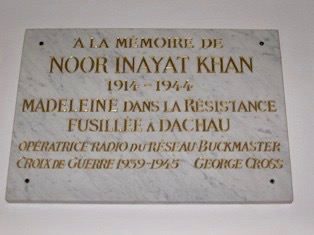
Noor Inayat Khan's memorial plaque at the Dachau Memorial Hall

Noor was classified as "highly dangerous" and shackled in chains most of the time. As the prison director testified after the war, Noor remained uncooperative and continued to refuse to give any information on her work or her fellow operatives, although in her despair at the appalling nature of her confinement, other prisoners could hear her crying at night. However, by scratching messages on the base of her mess cup, Noor was able to inform another inmate of her identity, giving the name of Nora Baker and the London address of her mother's house.

== Execution ==
On 12 September 1944, Noor Inayat Khan was abruptly transferred to the Dachau concentration camp along with her fellow agents Yolande Beekman, Madeleine Damerment and Eliane Plewman. At dawn on the following morning the four women were executed.

A Gestapo man named Max Wassmer was in charge of prisoner transports at Karlsruhe and accompanied the women to Dachau. Another Gestapo man named Christian Ott gave a statement to US investigators after the war as to the fate of Noor and her three companions. Ott was stationed at Karlsruhe and volunteered to accompany the four women to Dachau because he wanted to visit his family in Stuttgart on the return journey. Although he was not present at the execution, Ott told investigators what Wassmer had told him.

The four prisoners had come from the barrack in the camp, where they had spent the night, into the yard where the shooting was to take place. Here he [Wassmer] announced the death sentence to them. Only the Lagerkommandant and the two SS men were present. The German-speaking Englishwoman (the major) notified her companion about the death sentence. All four of the prisoners had grown very pale and wept; the major asked if they could protest against the sentence. The Kommandant declared that nobody could protest against the sentence. The major then requested to see a priest. The camp Kommandant denied the major's request on the ground that there was no priest in the camp. Now the four prisoners were ordered to kneel with their heads facing a small mound of earth before they were killed by the two SS men, one after another by a shot through the back of the neck. During the shooting, the two Englishwomen held hands and the two Frenchwomen did the same. For three of the prisoners, the first shot caused their deaths, but for the German-speaking Englishwoman, a second shot needed to be fired because she still showed signs of life after the first shot was fired. After the shooting of these prisoners the Lagerkommandant said to the two SS men that he took a personal interest in the jewellery of the women and that this should be taken into his office.

In 1958, an anonymous Dutch prisoner asserted that Noor was cruelly beaten by an SS officer named Wilhelm Ruppert before she was shot from behind. Her last word was reported as "Liberté". Noor was survived by her mother and three siblings.

== Honours and awards ==
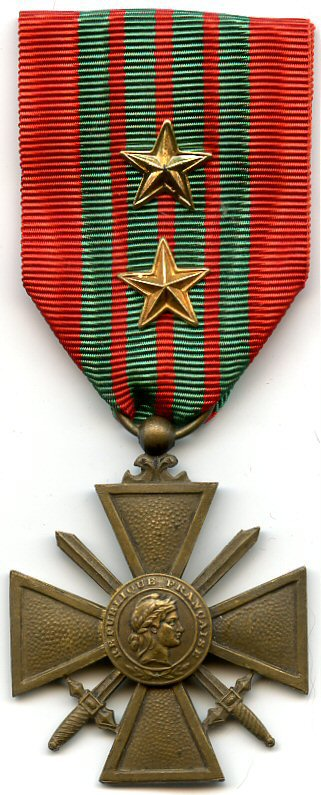
Croix de Guerre avec étoiles vermeil

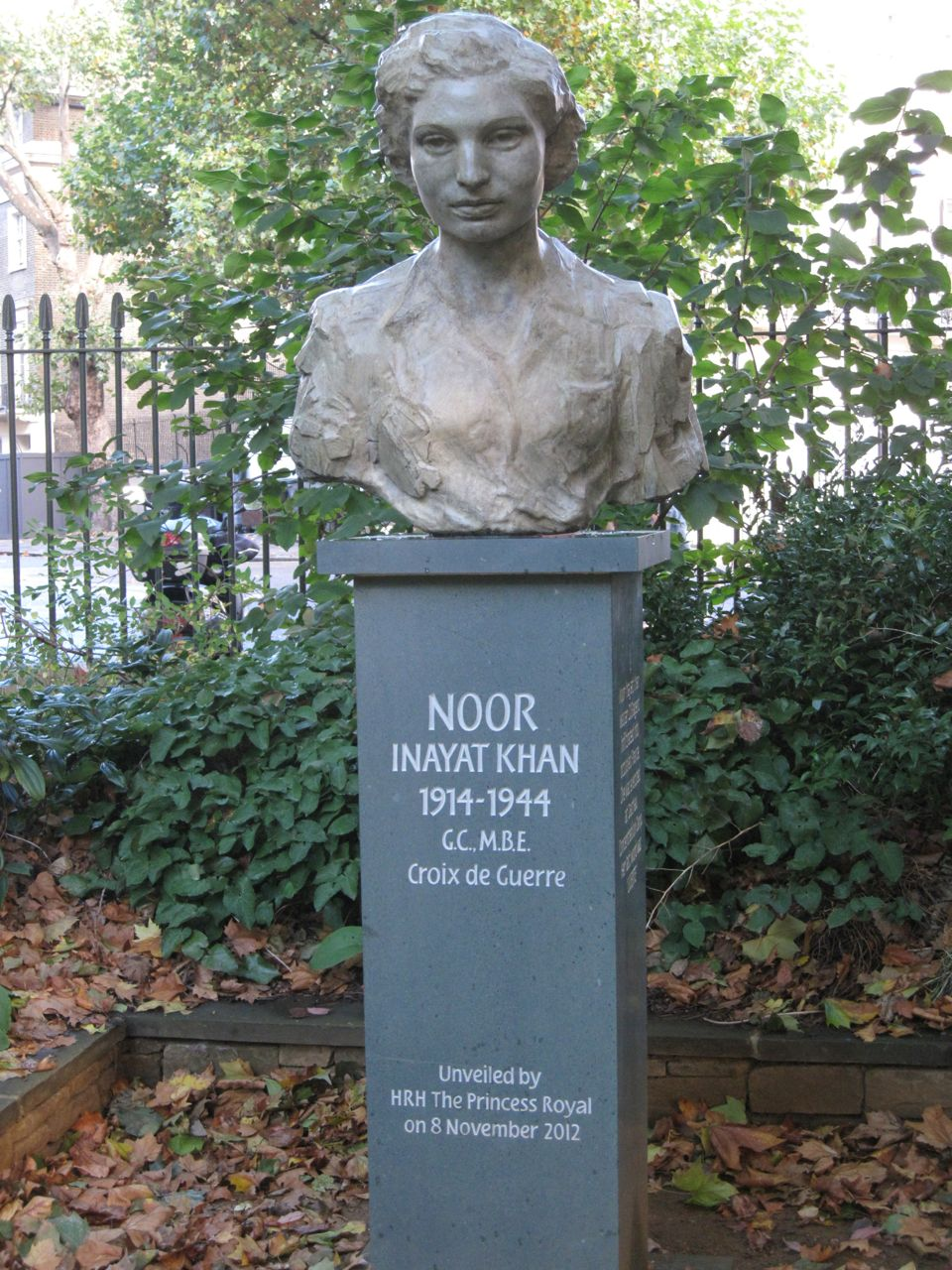
Memorial bust of Inayat Khan in Gordon Square Gardens, Bloomsbury, London

Noor Inayat Khan was posthumously awarded the George Cross in 1949. She was also awarded the French Croix de Guerre avec étoile de vermeil ("with a silver-gilt star"). Because she was still considered "missing" in 1946, she could not be appointed a Member of the Order of the British Empire, but her commission as Assistant Section Officer was gazetted in June (with effect from 5 July 1944), and she was Mentioned in Despatches in October 1946. Noor was the third of three Second World War FANY members to be awarded the George Cross, Britain's highest award for civilian gallantry.

At the beginning of 2011, a campaign to raise £100,000 in order to pay for the construction of a bronze bust of her in central London close to her former home was launched. The unveiling of the bronze bust by the Princess Royal took place on 8 November 2012 in Gordon Square Gardens, Bloomsbury, London.

Noor was commemorated in a set of postage stamps issued by the Royal Mail on 25 March 2014 about "Remarkable Lives". In 2018, a campaign was launched to have Noor represented on the next version of the £50 note.

There is a primary school in Suresnes, outside Paris, where her family lived before the war, which is named after her.

=== George Cross citation ===
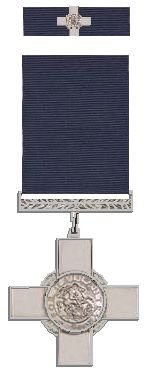
George Cross and ribbon bar.

The announcement of the award of the George Cross was made in the London Gazette of 5 April 1949. The full citation reads:

The KING has been graciously pleased to approve the posthumous award of the GEORGE CROSS to:— Assistant Section Officer Nora INAYAT-KHAN (9901), Women's Auxiliary Air Force.
Assistant Section Officer Nora INAYAT-KHAN was the first woman operator to be infiltrated into enemy occupied France, and she was landed by Lysander aircraft on 16th June, 1943. During the weeks immediately following her arrival, the Gestapo made mass arrests in the Paris Resistance groups to which she had been detailed. However, she refused to abandon what had become the principal and most dangerous post in France, even though she had been given the opportunity to return to England, because she did not want to leave her French comrades without communications and she also hoped to rebuild her group. Therefore, she remained at her post and did the excellent work which earned her a posthumous Mention in Despatches.
The Gestapo had a full description of her, but it only knew her code name "Madeleine". It deployed considerable forces in its effort to catch her and break the last remaining link with London. After 3 months, she was betrayed to the Gestapo and taken to its H.Q. in the Avenue Foch. The Gestapo had found her codes and messages and as a result, it was now in a position to work back to London. It asked her to co-operate, but she refused and gave it no information of any kind. She was imprisoned in one of the cells on the 5th floor of the Gestapo H.Q. and she remained there for several weeks during which time she made two unsuccessful attempts to escape. She was asked to sign a declaration which stated that she would make no further escape attempts, but she refused to sign it and the Chief of the Gestapo obtained permission to send her to Germany for "safe custody" from Berlin. She was the first enemy agent to be sent to Germany.
Assistant Section Officer INAYAT-KHAN was sent to Karlsruhe in November 1943, and then she was sent to Pforzheim where her cell was apart from the main prison. She was considered a particularly dangerous and uncooperative prisoner. The Director of the prison was also interrogated and confirmed that Assistant Section Officer INAYAT-KHAN refused to give any information whatsoever, either about her work or her colleagues when she was interrogated by the Karlsruhe Gestapo.
She was taken to the Dachau Concentration Camp with three other female prisoners on 12 September 1944. On her arrival, she was taken to the crematorium and shot.
Assistant Section Officer INAYAT-KHAN displayed the most conspicuous courage, both moral and physical over a period of more than 12 months.

George Cross
1939–1945 Star	France and Germany Star	War Medal with Mention in Dispatches	Croix de Guerre (avec étoile de vermeil)

=== Blue plaque ===
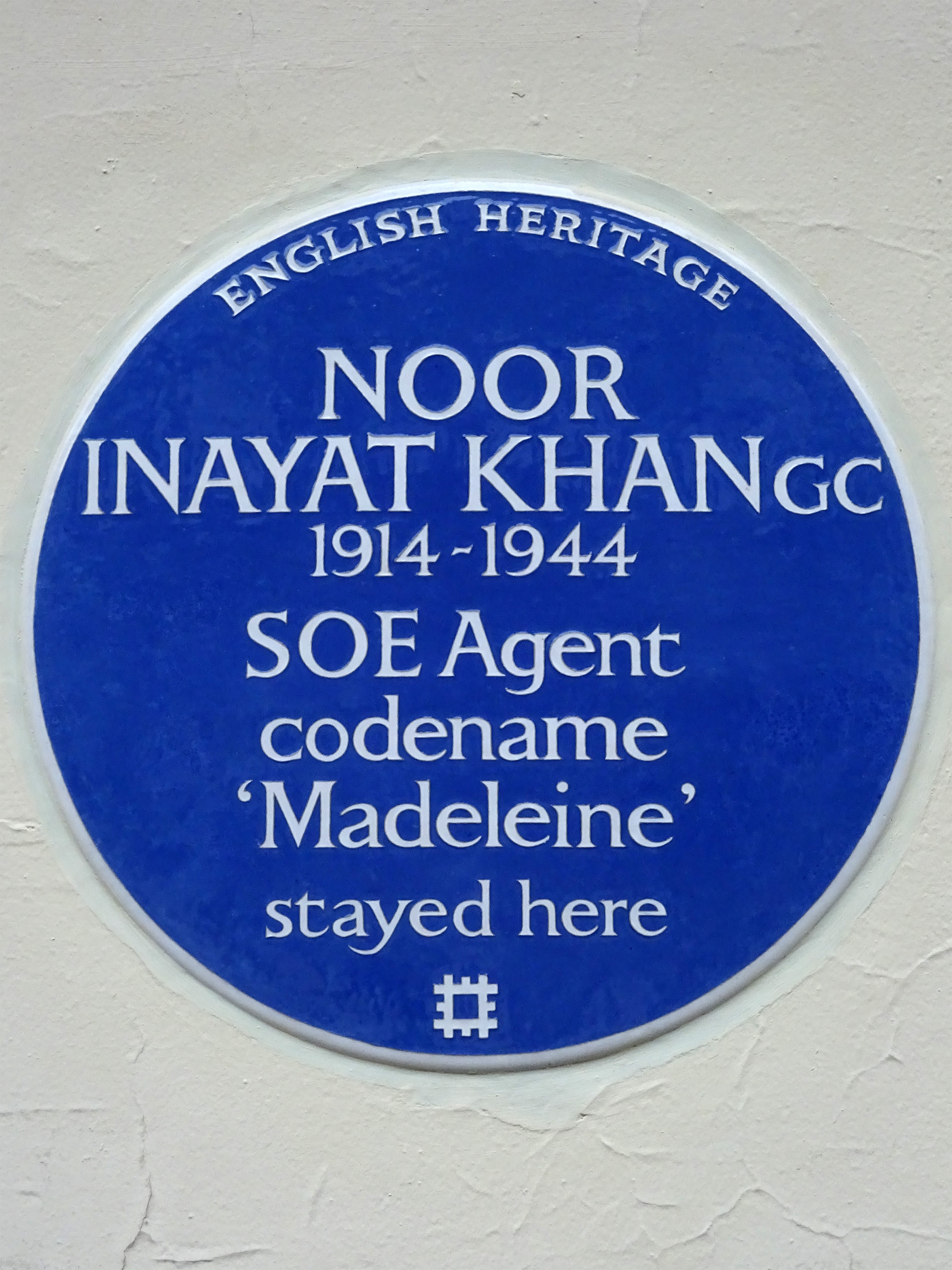
Blue plaque, August 2020

On 25 February 2019, it was announced Noor Inayat Khan would be honoured with a blue plaque at her wartime London home at 4 Taviton Street in Bloomsbury – the house she left on her final and fatal mission and the address she had etched into her bowl while in prison so she could be identified. Noor was the first woman of South Asian descent to have a blue plaque honouring her in London. The plaque was unveiled in a virtual ceremony broadcast on English Heritage's Facebook page at 7 pm on Friday 28 August 2020.

== Further information ==
Khan's military career is featured in the Ministry of Defence publication We were there. It details the contribution of members of ethnic communities to Britain in wartime over a period of two hundred years.

== In popular culture ==
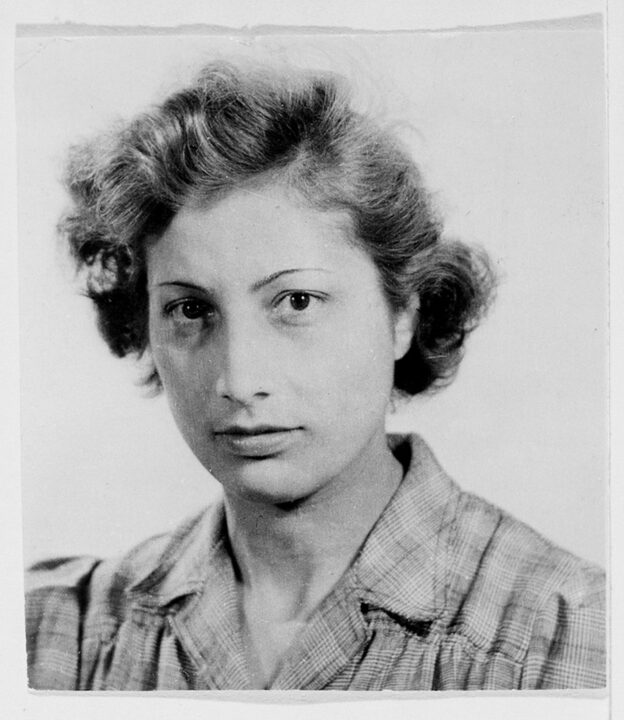
Noor Inayat Khan

=== Theatre ===
In 2022, Almanya Narula's one-woman show, Noor Inayat Khan: The Forgotten Spy, was performed at the Hollywood Fringe Festival in Los Angeles, California. In 2023, it toured nationally.

In 2018 a play based on the life of Khan, entitled Agent Madeleine, premiered at the Ottawa Fringe Festival.

In 2026 her life was the subject of a new play by Stephanie Street, A Small and Quiet Light, which was performed at Minerva Theatre, Chichester and at the Orange Tree Theatre in Richmond, London.

Khan is the basis for Catalyst Theatre's all-female musical The Invisible: Agents of Ungentlemanly Warfare. Book, music and lyrics by Jonathan Christenson.

Vera Atkins' search to find out how Khan died is the subject of the 2022 play S.O.E. by Deborah Clair.

=== Film ===
Noor's story is featured in the 2019 film A Call to Spy, written by Sarah Megan Thomas and directed by Lydia Dean Pilcher. Noor is played by Indian actress Radhika Apte.

Noor is the central character in the 2021 live action short film Liberté in which she is played by British actress Sam Naz. The film, directed by Christopher Hanvey, was shot on location at Beaulieu Palace House where Noor had trained for SOE and features music which was composed in Noor's memory by her brother Hidayat Inayat Khan.

=== Television ===
- The third episode of the Indian anthology series Adrishya, which aired on Epic TV in 2014, was based on Noor Inayat Khan's wartime career, up to her death in Nazi Germany.
- A Man Called Intrepid (first airdate February 1979), a six-hour, fact-based TV miniseries broadcast in Canada on CTV and in the US on NBC, starred David Niven as its protagonist Sir William Stephenson, and Barbara Hershey as Noor. It contains a number of deviations from the facts.
- In 2014, PBS aired a 60-minute biographical docudrama entitled Enemy of the Reich: The Noor Inayat Khan Story, executive produced by Alex Kronemer and Michael Wolfe of Unity Productions Foundation and directed by Robert H. Gardner. Grace Srinivasan played the title role.
- In 2018, Netflix released an original series entitled Churchill's Secret Agents: the new recruits. Season 1, episode 4 featured a summary of Noor's final mission with the SOE.
- On 5 January 2020, Aurora Marion played Noor in "Spyfall, Part 2", the second episode of Doctor Who, series 12.

=== Radio ===
In November 1980, as an afternoon theatre production, BBC Radio 4 broadcast a play about Noor written by Patrice Chaplin.

In November 1980, The Knightsbridge Memorial, a play about Noor, was broadcast on BBC Radio 4 as a Saturday-Night Theatre production.

In March 2025, Noor was the subject of an episode of the third series of History’s Secret Heroes on BBC Radio 4, narrated by Helena Bonham Carter

== See also ==
- British military history of World War II
- Jean Overton Fuller, first biographer of Inayat Khan
- Military history of France during World War II
- Resistance during World War II

== Sources ==
- Basu, Shrabani (2006). Spy Princess: The Life of Noor Inayat Khan. Sutton Publishing. pp. xx–xxi. ISBN 978-0750939652.
- Brown, Anthony Cave (2007). Bodyguard of Lies. Globe Pequot Press. ISBN 978-1599213835.
- Escott, Beryl E. (1991). Mission Improbable: A salute to RAF women of SOE in wartime France. Sparkford, Somerset: P. Stephens. ISBN 978-1852602895.
- Foot, M. R. D. (2004) [1966]. SOE in France (Revised ed.). London: Whitehall History Publications. pp. 297–99. ISBN 978-0714655284. Comprehensive look at the SOE in France during WW2.
- Fuller, Jean Overton (1989). Dericourt: The Chequered Spy (Revised ed.). London: Michael Russell. pp. 297–99. ISBN 978-0859551496. Comprehensive look at Dericourt.
- Jean Overton Fuller, Born For Sacrifice (Pan Books, 1957)
- Helm, Sarah (2005). A Life in Secrets: Vera Atkins and the Missing Agents of WWII. New York: Anchor Books. ISBN 978-1-4000-3140-5. Documents Atkins' post-war search for missing SOE agents including Borrel.
- Kramer, Rita (1995). Flames in the Field. London: Michael Joseph. ISBN 978-1-4538-3427-5. Focus on the four female SOE agents (Borrel, Leigh, Olschanezky and Rowden) executed in the Natzweiler-Struthof concentration camp.
- Visram, Rozina (1986). Ayahs, Lascars and Princes: The Story of Indians in Britain 1700–1947. London: Pluto Press. ISBN 978-0745300740.
