= Inayati Order =

International organization dedicated to spreading the Sufi teachings of Inayat Khan

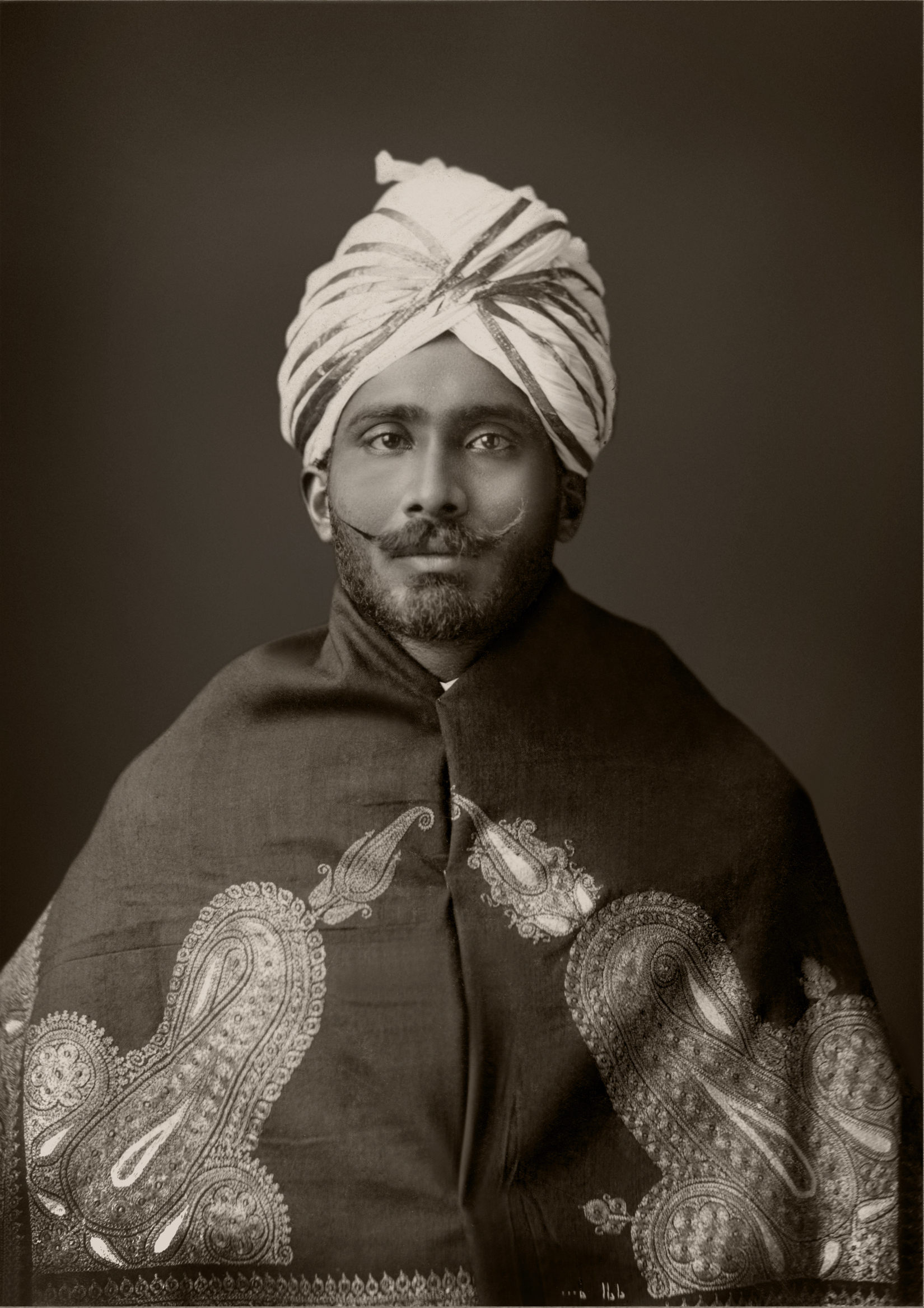
Hazrat Inayat Khan (1882–1927), founder of the Inayati Order.

The Inayati Order (officially called Inayatiyya) is an international organisation dedicated to spreading the Sufi teachings of Inayat Khan, a musician and mystic who first introduced Sufism to the modern Western world in 1910. The Inayati Order operates internationally through a network of centers, and offers a number of programs and activities. It is led by Zia Inayat Khan, grandson of Inayat Khan.

== Objectives of the Order ==
The Inayati Order commits itself to the purposes identified by Inayat Khan at the point of the first establishment of his Sufi organisation:

1. To realize and spread the knowledge of unity, the religion of love and wisdom, so that the bias of faiths and beliefs may of itself fall away, the human heart may overflow with love, and all hatred caused by distinctions and differences may be rooted out.
2. To discover the light and power latent in the human being, the secret of all religion, the power of mysticism, and the essence of philosophy, without interfering with customs or beliefs.
3. To help bring the world’s two opposite poles, East and West, close together by the interchange of thoughts and ideals, that the universal brotherhood-sisterhood may form of itself, and people may meet beyond the narrow national and racial boundaries.

== Sufi message of Inayat Khan ==
According to the Inayati Order website, the Sufi Message of Inayat Khan proclaims "the knowledge of divine unity—of all peoples, all religions, and all existence—and the religion of the heart awakened to the beauty in all creation."

Core teachings are summarised in the 10 Sufi Thoughts, “which comprise all the important subjects with which the inner life is concerned”:

1. "There is one God, the eternal, the only being; none else exists save God."
2. "There is one master, the guiding spirit of all souls, who constantly leads followers toward the light."
3. "There is one holy book, the sacred manuscript of nature, the only scripture which can enlighten the reader."
4. "There is one religion, the unswerving progress in the right direction toward the ideal, which fulfills the life’s purpose of every soul."
5. "There is one law, the law of reciprocity, which can be observed by a selfless conscience, together with a sense of awakened justice."
6. "There is one family, the human family, which unites the children of earth indiscriminately in the parenthood of God."
7. "There is one moral, the love which springs forth from self-denial and blooms in deeds of beneficence."
8. "There is one object of praise, the beauty which uplifts the heart of its worshipers through all aspects from the seen to the unseen."
9. "There is one truth, the true knowledge of our being, within and without, which is the essence of all wisdom."
10. "There is one path, the annihilation in the Unlimited, which raises the mortal to immortality, and in which resides all perfection."

== Lineage ==
The initiatic lineage of the Inayati Order includes chains of transmission from the Chishti, Suhrawardi, Qadiri, and Naqshbandi orders, as founder Inayat Khan was initiated into these four streams.

There are several living lineages and organisations that trace their origins to Inayat Khan. The Inayati Order represents the lineage passed directly to his eldest son, Vilayat Inayat Khan, includes his daughter Noor Inayat Khan, and is currently led by his grandson Zia Inayat Khan.

== History ==
In 1910, Inayat Khan traveled from Hyderabad, India, to the United States, relocating in 1912 to London. His initial mission was as a classical Indian musician, pursuing the directive of his own Sufi teacher Abu Hashim Madani to "Fare forth into the world, my child, and harmonise the East and the West with the harmony of your music. Spread the wisdom of Sufism abroad, for to this end art thou gifted by Allah, the most merciful and compassionate."

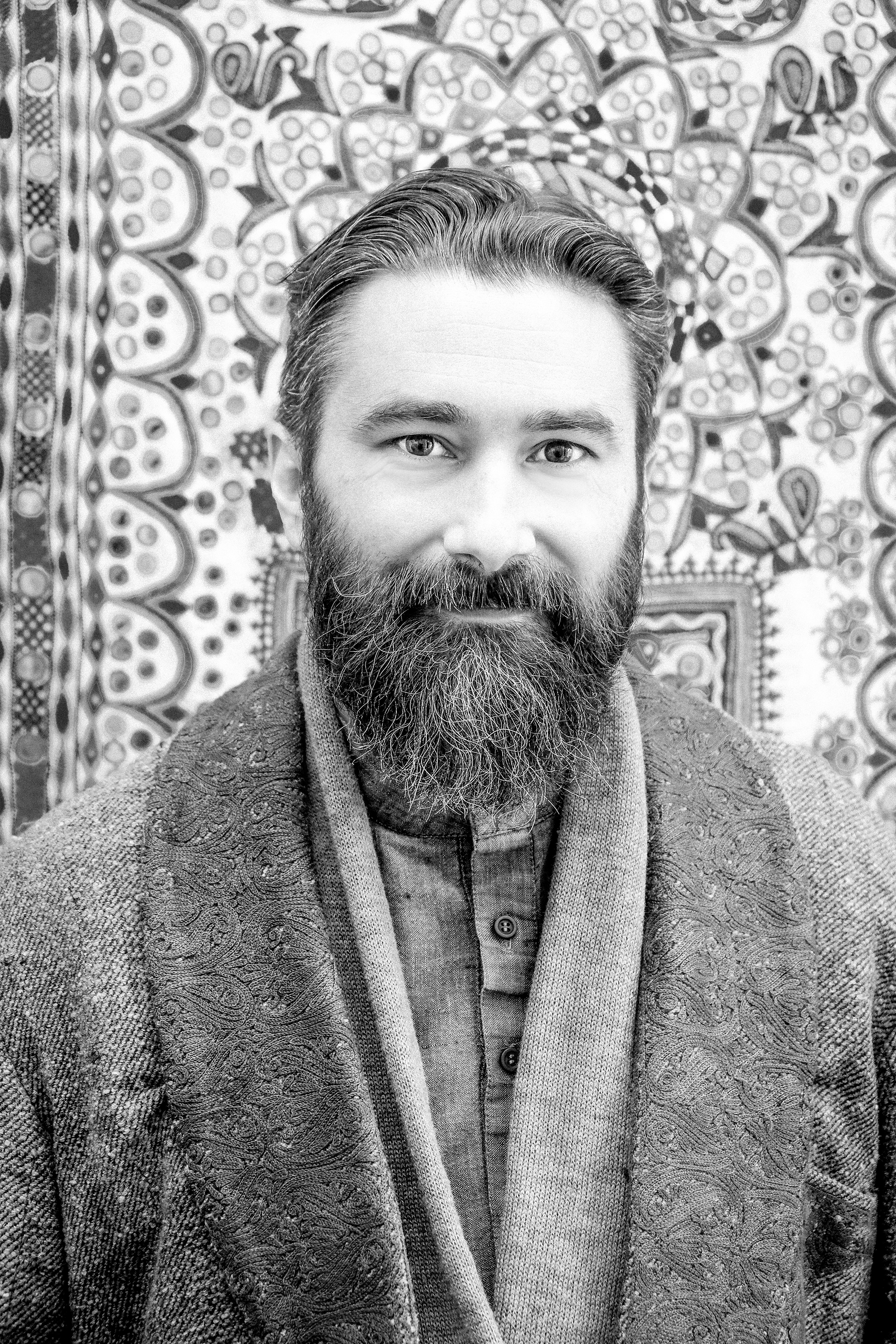
Pir Zia Inayat Khan, lineage holder of the Inayati Order

Inayat Khan later founded organisations to establish Sufi teaching in Western Europe, including the Sufi Order in London in 1918 and the Sufi Movement in Geneva in 1923. Inayat Khan also traveled extensively in the United States as a musician and teacher, and established a circle of students in North America.

Upon Inayat Khan’s death in 1927, his brothers and cousins led the Sufi Movement. In 1968, his son Vilayat Inayat Khan revived the name “The Sufi Order” to distinguish his own lineage and circle of students. Vilayat Inayat Khan later updated this to “The Sufi Order International,” and served as head of the order until 2004. During this time Inayat Khan’s teachings grew in popularity and The Sufi Order International held numerous retreats, courses, and gatherings in Europe and North America.

Zia Inayat Khan took on leadership of the Sufi Order in 2000. In 2003, Zia Inayat Khan and senior teachers launched Suluk Academy, a course of intensive study in the teachings of Inayat Khan. In 2016, the name was changed from The Sufi Order International to The Inayati Order, citing the historical Sufi tradition of adopting the name of the founder in the decades following the founder’s death. In 2020, the official name was changed to Inayatiyya.

As of 2019, the Inayati Order comprises over 100 centers of study around the world, with headquarters in Richmond, Virginia.

== See also ==
- Friedrich von Frankenberg
