= Inayat Khan =

Indian singer, poet and Sufi guide (1882–1927)

Hazrat Inayat Khan
- عنایت خان رحمت خان
- Title: Pir-o-Murshid; Shaikh al-Mashaikh; Tansen Zamanihal; Yüzkhan; Bakhshi; Shah; Mir-Khayl

Personal life
- Born: Inayat Khan Rehmat Khan; July 5, 1882 Baroda, Bombay Presidency, British India
- Died: February 5, 1927 (aged 44) New Delhi, British India
- Spouse: Pirani Ameena Begum
- Children: Vilayat; Hidayat; Noor; Khair-un-Nisa Inayat Khan

Religious life
- Religion: Islam
- Denomination: Sunni
- Jurisprudence: Hanafi
- Creed: Sufism
- Profession: Musician, Pir, Musicologist

Muslim leader
- Successor: Vilayat
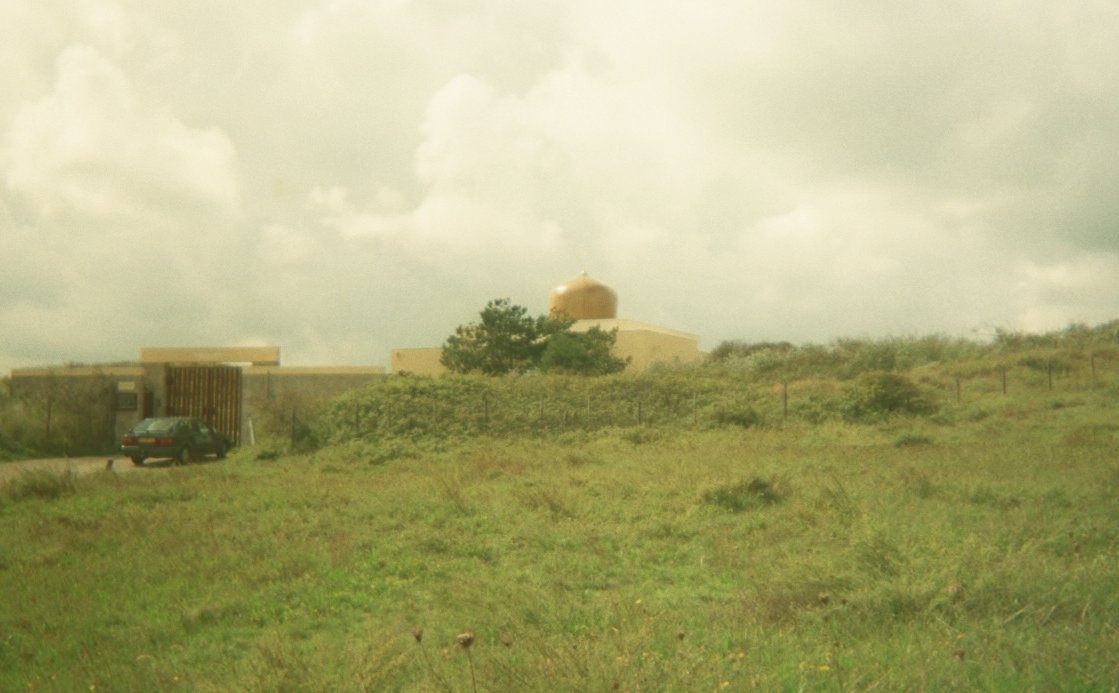
- Universel Murad Hassil, Netherlands

Sant and Pir
- Venerated in: Inayatiyya; Western Sufism
- Major shrine: Dargah in Hazrat Nizamuddin, Delhi
- Influences: Sayyid Abu Hashim Madani
- Influenced: Universal Sufism
- Tradition or genre: Chishti, and other major Sufi tariqa

Inayat Khan Rehmat Khan (Urdu: عنایت خان رحمت خان; 5 July 1882 – 5 February 1927), was an Indian professor of musicology, singer, exponent of the sarasvati vina, poet, philosopher, writer, and pioneer of the transmission of Sufism to the West. At the urging of his students, and on the basis of his ancestral Sufi tradition and four-fold training and authorisation at the hands of Sayyid Abu Hashim Madani (d. 1907) of Hyderabad, he established an order of Sufism (The Sufi Order) in London in 1914. By the time of his death in 1927, centers had been established throughout Europe and North America, and multiple volumes of his teachings had been published.

== Early life ==
Inayat Khan was born in Baroda to a noble Mughal family. His paternal ancestors, comprising yüzkhans (Central Asian lords) and bakshys (shamans), were Turkmen from the Chagatai Khanate who settled in Sialkot, Punjab during the reign of Timur. Inayat Khan's maternal grandfather, Sangit Ratna Maulabakhsh Sholay Khan, was a Hindustani classical musician and educator known as "the Beethoven of India". His maternal grandmother, Qasim Bibi, was from the royal house of Tipu Sultan of Mysore.

== Sufism ==
Inayat Khan's Sufi sources included both the traditions of his paternal ancestors (remembered as the Mahashaikhan) and the tutelage he received from Sayyid Abu Hashim Madani. From the latter he inherited four transmissions, constituting succession in the Chishti, Suhrawardi, Qadiri, and Naqshbandi orders of Sufism. Of these, the Chishti lineage, traced through the Delhi-based legacy of Shah Kalim Allah Jahanabadi, was primary.

== Travels and writings ==
Inayat Khan toured the United States with his brother Maheboob Khan and cousin Mohammed Ali Khan between the years 1910 and 1912. Further travels took him to England, France, and Russia. During the First World War, living in London, he oversaw the founding of an order of Sufism under his guidance. Following the war he traveled widely, and numerous Sufi centers sprang up in his wake in Europe and the U.S. He ultimately settled in Suresnes, France, at the house and khanqah (Sufi lodge) known as Fazal Manzil.

In propagating his Sufi teachings to Western students, he focused on universalist messages of spirituality and self-examination, while not requiring his disciples to convert to Islam. He also appointed women to many significant roles in his movement.

== Teaching ==
Inayat Khan's teaching emphasised the oneness of God (tawhid) and the underlying harmony of the revelations communicated by the prophets of all the world's great religions. His discourses treated such varied subjects as religion, art, music, ethics, philosophy, psychology, and health and healing. The primary concern of Inayat Khan's teaching was the mystical pursuit of God-realisation. To this end he established an Inner School comprising four stages of contemplative study based on the traditional Sufi disciplines of mujahada, muraqaba, mushahada, and mu‘ayyana, which he rendered in English as concentration, contemplation, meditation, and realisation.

=== Foundational principles ===
Ten principles, known as the Ten Sufi Thoughts, enunciate the universal spiritual values that are foundational to Inayat Khan's mystical philosophy.

1. There is One God, the Eternal, the Only Being; none exists save God.
2. There is One Master, the Guiding Spirit of all Souls, Who constantly leads followers towards the light.
3. There is One Holy Book, the sacred manuscript of nature, the only scripture which can enlighten the reader.
4. There is One Religion, the unswerving progress in the right direction towards the ideal, which fulfills the life's purpose of every soul.
5. There is One Law, the law of reciprocity, which can be observed by a selfless conscience together with a sense of awakened justice.
6. There is One Brotherhood and Sisterhood, the human brotherhood and sisterhood, which unites the children of earth indiscriminately in the Parenthood of God.
7. There is One Moral, the love which springs forth from self-denial, and blooms in deeds of beneficence.
8. There is One Object of Praise, the beauty which uplifts the heart of its worshippers through all aspects from the seen to the unseen.
9. There is One Truth, the true knowledge of our being, within and without, which is the essence of all wisdom.
10. There is One Path, the annihilation of the false ego in the real, which raises the mortal to immortality, and in which resides all perfection.

== Family and personal life ==
In New York, he met the woman who would become his wife, Ameena Begum née Ora Ray Baker. They had four children: Vilayat Inayat Khan, Hidayat Inayat Khan, Noor Inayat Khan, and Khair-un-Nisa Inayat Khan.

Inayat Khan was a contemporary of Kahlil Gibran and maintained a close friendship with him. A quote from Gibran's book Prophet "to know the pain of too much tenderness" is believed to refer to Khan. He was a prolific vina player, seeing the instrument and music-making more broadly as paths to understanding God. That said, he quit playing the instrument mid-life, believe himself to have fulfilled spiritual enrichment through music and opted to focus on spreading Sufism.

== Death and legacy ==
In 1926 Inayat Khan returned to India; he died of pneumonia in Delhi on 5 February 1927. His brother Maheboob succeed him as the head of the Western-oriented Sufi Movement. He is buried in the Inayat Khan Dargah in Nizamuddin, Delhi. The dargah is open to the public and hosts qawwali sessions.

Since his death, Inayat Khan has been viewed as an early pioneer in the propagation of Sufi teachings and practices to Western audiences, and ability to connect with students from all cultural and religious backgrounds through addressing transcendent values and fundamental human needs for purpose and meaning in life. Inayat is also perceived as having found a successful formula for harmonising India's ecumenical Eastern spiritualities —beyond merely Islam — with Western culture.

Posthumously, various lectures and talks of his have been compiled by scholars and supporters into books. One such work, A Sufi Master Answers: On the Sufi Message of Hazrat Inayat Khan was published in 1997 by a devote of Inayat Khan. Dr. Elizabeth Keesing.

== Bibliography ==
=== Musicological works ===
- Balasan Gitmala
- Sayaji Garbawali
- Inayat Git Ratnawali
- Inayat Harmonium Shikshak
- Inayat Fidal Shikshak
- Minqar-i Musiqar

=== Sufi works ===
- 1914 – A Sufi Message of Spiritual Liberty
- 1915 – The Confessions of Inayat Khan
- 1918 – A Sufi Prayer of Invocation
- Hindustani Lyrics
- Songs of India
- The Divan of Inayat Khan
- Akibat
- 1919 – Love, Human and Divine
- The Phenomenon of the Soul
- Pearls from the Ocean Unseen
- 1921 – In an Eastern Rosegarden
- 1922 – The Way of Illumination
- The Message
- 1923 – The Inner Life
- The Mysticism of Sound
- Notes from the Unstruck Music from the Gayan Manuscript
- The Alchemy of Happiness
- 1924 – The Soul—Whence and Whither
- 1926 – The Divine Symphony, or Vadan

=== Posthumous Sufi works ===
- 1927 – Nirtan, or The Dance of the Soul
- The Purpose of Life
- 1928 – The Unity of Religious Ideals
- 1931 – Health
- Character Building; The Art of Personality
- 1934 – Education
- 1935 – The Mind World
- Yesterday, Today, and Tomorrow
- 1936 The Bowl of Saki
- The Solution of the Problem of the Day
- 1937 – Cosmic Language
- Moral Culture
- 1938 – Rassa Shastra: The Science of Life's Creative Forces
- 1939 – Three Plays
- Metaphysics: The Experience of the Soul in Different Planes of Existence
- 1980 – Nature Meditations

=== Collected works ===
- 1960 – 1967 The Sufi Message of Hazrat Inayat Khan, 12 volumes
- 1988 – Complete Works of Pir-o-Murshid Hazrat Inayat Khan: Original Texts, 12 volumes (to date)
- 2016 – The Sufi Message of Hazrat Inayat Khan: Centennial Edition, 4 volumes (to date)

== See also ==
- Inayati Order
- Vilayat Inayat Khan (son)
- Western Sufism
- Zia Inayat Khan (grandson, current president of the Inayati Order)
- Sufi Ruhaniat International
