= List of magazines in Pakistan =

The following is a list of notable magazines and publications in Pakistan.

== In English ==
- Herald, (News magazine, published in Karachi, owned by Dawn Group of Newspapers, suspended its publication after July 2019)
- Newsline, (Monthly current affairs magazine, published in Karachi)
- Pakistan & Gulf Economist, (Weekly magazine on business and economy, published in Karachi)
- Pakistan Textile Journal, (Monthly textile magazine, published in Karachi)
- Shaheen Annual Youth Magazine, (In languages English, Urdu, Saraiki & Pashto, published in Allama Iqbal Medical College, Lahore)
- Spider, (Monthly computer magazine, published in Karachi, owned by the Dawn group, suspended its publication in 2014)
- Trade Chronicle, (monthly commerce magazine)

== In Urdu ==
- Bayyināt, monthly magazine of Jamia Uloom-ul-Islamia
- Akhbar e Jahan, Karachi
- Global Science, Karachi
- The Cricketer, Karachi
- Family Magazine, Lahore
- Jadeed Adab, literary magazine, Khanpur and Germany
- Nida e Millat, Lahore
- Nigar, Karachi

=== Digests ===
- Dosheeza Digest, Karachi
- Kiran Digest, Karachi
- Suspense Digest, Karachi
- Urdu Digest, Lahore
- Sabrang Digest, Karachi
- Hikayat Digest, Lahore
- Sayara Digest, Lahore

=== Health journals ===
- Hamdard-e-Sehat, Karachi

=== Children's magazines ===
- Hamdard Naunehal, Karachi
- Monthly Sathee, Karachi
- Anokhi Kahaniyan, Karachi
- Monthly Phool, Lahore
- Taleem-o-Tarbiat, Lahore

== In Sindhi ==
- Mehran Magazine, Karachi
- Waskaro, Karachi
- Laat, Karachi
- Gul Phul, Karachi

== In Punjabi ==
- Lehran, Lahore

=== Children's magazines ===
- Monthly Pukheroo, Lahore
