= Pakistani literature =

Pakistani literature (Urdu: ادبیاتِ پاکستان) is a distinct literature that gradually came to be defined after Pakistan gained nationhood status in 1947, emerging out of literary traditions of the Indian subcontinent. The shared tradition of Urdu literature and English literature of British India was inherited by the new state. Over a big time of period a body of literature unique to Pakistan has emerged in nearly all major Pakistani languages, including Urdu, English, Punjabi, Pashto, Balochi, Sindhi, and Saraiki.

There have been many bibliographies and biographical dictionaries documenting Pakistani writers, including the Ahl-i-Qalam Directory published by the Pakistan Academy of Letters and often revised, in its 2010 edition including 3,500 writers but only those alive at that time.

== History ==
The nature of Pakistani literature soon after independence aroused controversy among writers due to its being centred heavily on the negative events related to the independence movement. According to Gilani Kamran (GC University), Pakistani literature was expected to take a new direction along with the new state of Pakistan at this point, but did not immediately meet this expectation.

Saadat Hasan Manto (1912–1955), a prominent writer of short stories writing mainly in Urdu, produced great literature out of the events relating to the India-Pakistan partition. His literature is considered to be progressive in its tone and spirit. According to several critics it had not only evolved its own identity but also had played a significant role in documenting the hardships and hopes of Pakistan in the 20th century.

Today, Pakistani literature has taken a shape of its own by depicting the complex class system and the common man. It also has evolved in merging Urdu literary forms and English literature leading to experimentation. Many writers of fiction borrow from English and vice versa.

Pakistani literature's main official platform is the Pakistan Academy of Letters, whose work is overseen by a Board of Governors.

== Pre-1947 literary heritage and manuscripts ==
The territories of present-day Pakistan were historically part of a wider Indo-Islamic manuscript culture, within which substantial bodies of handwritten texts were produced in Arabic, Persian, later Urdu, and regional languages. Manuscripts preserved in contemporary public and private collections point to the intellectual and literary traditions that later influenced Pakistani literature. Estimates suggest that Pakistan may hold around 2 million manuscripts, predominantly in Arabic and Persian, a large proportion of which concern Islamic religious, historical, artistic, and cultural traditions. Many significant private collections remain largely undocumented and under-researched, and these are primarily Islamic in character.

== Digests ==
Since 1960s Pakistan had periodicals called digests. There are hundreds of such digests. Some digests cater to current events, but a large number of them publish pulp fiction with Karachi being the centre of popular pulp fiction. Ibn-e-Safi of Sabrang Digest (1960s) remains one of Pakistan's popular pulp fiction writers. Mohiuddin Nawab ran a 33 year long Suspense Digest series called Devta until 2010. Fiction digests which were not adequately in tune with Pakistan's Islamist religious orthodoxy under General Zia faced challenges, but also found ways and means to bypass the official and unofficial moral police (at times by bribing them).

According to Haseeb Asif historically not only romance and sexuality but also soft erotica had always been a part of Pakistani pulp fiction digests, only that some of them make it feel it guilt free by imputing it as something negative along natural human instincts. While government tried to interfere, one important cross road came with television and thereafter digital media. Some of digest writers shifted to television drama script writing, at a time when print media digests started depending more upon advertising and spirituality (rather than subscriptions) and therefore had to compromise with their sexual openness to an extent. According to Asif as the predominant language of these digests is that of middle class Pakistani society, consuming sexual content masked with imputing moral guilt on self and judging upper and lower classes too is a feature of this middle class. Asif further says while some of the authors of classical Urdu literature also explored human sexuality, but predominantly questiones social and patriarchal hypocrisy where as pulp fiction continue to comprise misogyny and patriarchal values of the society.

== Literature by language ==
=== English ===
English is one of the official languages of Pakistan (Urdu, being the other) and has been established in the area since the British colonial era. The dialect of English spoken in Pakistan is known as Pakistani English. English language poetry from Pakistan from the beginning held a special place in South Asian writing, notably with the work of Hasan Shaheed Suhrawardy, Ahmed Ali, Alamgir Hashmi, Daud Kamal, Taufiq Rafat, and Maki Kureishi, and later of M. Athar Tahir, Waqas Ahmed Khwaja, Omer Tarin, Hina Babar Ali and others; but fiction from Pakistan began to receive recognition in the latter part of the 20th century, with the popularity of the Parsi author Bapsi Sidhwa who wrote The Crow Eaters (1978), Cracking India (1988), etc., after the earlier reputations of Ahmed Ali and Zulfikar Ghose had been made in international fiction. In the diaspora, Hanif Kureishi commenced a prolific career with the novel The Buddha of Suburbia (1990), which won the Whitbread Award, and Aamer Hussein wrote a series of acclaimed short story collections. Sara Suleri published her literary memoir, Meatless Days (1989).

Pakistani English writing has had some readership in the country. From 1980s Pakistani English literature began to receive national and official recognition, when the Pakistan Academy of Letters included works originally written English in its annual literary awards. The first major English writer to receive this national honour was Alamgir Hashmi. Subsequently, through the last three decades, a number of other English writers, including Bapsi Sidhwa and Nadeem Aslam, have been recognized by the Academy. In the early years of the 21st century, a number of Pakistani novelists writing in English won or were shortlisted for international awards. Mohsin Hamid published his first novel Moth Smoke (2000), which won the Betty Trask Award and was a finalist for the PEN/Hemingway Award; he has since published his second novel, The Reluctant Fundamentalist (2007), which was shortlisted for the Man Booker Prize. British-Pakistani writer Nadeem Aslam won the Kiriyama Prize for his second book, Maps for Lost Lovers (2004). The first novel of Mohammed Hanif, A Case of Exploding Mangoes (2008) was shortlisted for the 2008 Guardian First Book Award. Emerging authors Kamila Shamsie and Daniyal Mueenuddin have garnered wide attention.

As of 2018, it was estimated that more than 100 Pakistani authors had collectively published over 150 novels, short-story collections and anthologies in English.

== See also ==
- Pakistani poetry
- Pakistani comics
- Postcolonial literature
- Book publishing in Pakistan
- Progressive Writers' Movement
- Karachi Literature Festival
