= Inayatullah =

Inayatullah, (Arabic: عنایت الله) also spelled Enayat Ollah etc., (Urdu: عنایت اللہ) is a masculine given name and surname of Arabic origin. It is composed of the elements Inayat, meaning "care", and Allah, meaning "God". It most commonly occurs in Islamic Iranic and Turkic communities. Notable people with the name include:

== Historical ==
- Inayatullah Kashmiri, Mughal noble of Kashmiri descent
- Inayatullah Khan Sial (1715–1787), Punjabi Muslim general and chieftain
- Shaikh Inayat Allah Kamboh (1608–1671), Indian scholar, writer, and historian
- Shah Inayatullah (1613–1701), Sindhi revolutionary poet

== Given name ==
- Enayat Ullah (born 1992), Pakistani musician and singer
- Enayatollah Atashi (1946–2026), Iranian basketball coach
- Enayatollah Bakhshi (1945–2026), Iranian actor
- Enayatullah Enayat, Afghan provincial governor
- Enayatullah Nazari (born 1954), Afghan politician
- Enayatollah Reza (1920–2010), Iranian historian and philosopher
- Inayat Ullah (wrestler) (born 2001), Pakistani wrestler
- Inayatullah (editor) (1920–1999), founding editor of Hikayat Digest, Pakistan
- Inayatullah (Guantanamo detainee 10029) (1974–2011), Afghan Guantanamo detainee, captured in 2007
- Inayatullah Khan (disambiguation)
- Inayatullah Khan Gandapur (1919–2005), Pakistani politician
- Inayatullah Khan Mashriqi (1888–1963), Pakistani mathematician, logician, political theorist, and Islamic scholar
- Inayat Ollah Khan Niazi (born 1940), Pakistani military officer
- Sardar Inayatullah Khan Gandapur (1919–2005), Pakistani politician

== Surname ==
- Attiya Inayatullah, Pakistani politician
- Choudhry Inayatullah (1922–??), Pakistani journalist, founding editor of Daily Mashriq
- Sohail Inayatullah (born 1958), Pakistani-Australian futurologist
