= Inayat Khan (disambiguation) =

Inayat Khan (1882–1927) was an Indian Sufi guide and the founder of Universal Sufism and Sufi Order International.

Inayat Khan may also refer to:

== Indian Sufi dynasty ==
- Noor Inayat Khan (1914–1944), daughter of Inayat Khan
- Hidayat Inayat Khan (1917–2016), son of Inayat Khan
- Vilayat Inayat Khan (1916–2004), son of Inayat Khan
- Zia Inayat Khan (born 1971), grandson of Inayat Khan
- Fazal Inayat-Khan (1942–1990), grandson of Inayat Khan

== Others ==
- the subject of a 1618 painting The Death of Inayat Khan
- Enayat Khan (1895–1938), Indian musician, sitar and surbahar player
- Inayat Hussain Khan (1849–1919), Indian classical vocalist
- Inayat Khan (cricketer) (born 1922), Pakistani cricketer
- Inayat Khan (historian) (1628–1671), Mughal historian, author of Shah Jahan-náma
- Inayat Ollah Khan Niazi (born 1940), Pakistan Army officer
- Inayat Khan, a fictional police officer portrayed by Sanjay Dutt in the 2000 Indian film Mission Kashmir

== See also ==
- Inayatullah Khan (disambiguation)
- Inayat, a male given name
