= Inayat =

Inayat (Bengali: এনায়েত, Urdu: عنایت) is a masculine given name of Arabic origin. It may refer to:

== Given name ==
- Enayat Khan (1894–1938), Indian sitar and surbahar player
- Inayat Bunglawala, British-Indian media secretary of the Muslim Council of Britain
- Inayat Hussain Khan (1849–1919), Indian classical vocalist.
- Inayat Khan (1882–1927), Indian Sufi, founder of Sufi Order International.
- Inayat Ollah Khan Niazi (born 1940), Pakistan Army officer
- Fazal Inayat-Khan (1942–1990), French psychotherapist and poet
- Hidayat Inayat Khan (1917–2016), British-French classical composer
- Noor Inayat Khan (1914–1944), British resistance agent
- Shah Inayat Qadiri (1643–1728), Punjabi Sufi saint of Qadiriyyah Silsilah
- Vilayat Inayat Khan (1916–2004), son of Inayat Khan
- Zia Inayat Khan (born 1971), American scholar of Sufism

== Places ==
- Inayatabad

== See also ==
- Inayatullah (disambiguation)
- Inayat Khan (disambiguation)
