= Gul Hameed Bhatti =

Pakistani journalist

Gul Hameed Bhatti (Urdu: گل حمید بھٹی; 1947 – 4 February 2010) was a Pakistani journalist, editor and a leading sports writer.

Known as Pakistan's "Encyclopaedia of Cricket", Bhatti wrote for The Cricketer, published from Karachi.

== Early life and career ==
Gul Hameed Bhatti was born in Lahore, Pakistan in September 1947. After completing his education, he first trained as a commercial airlines pilot but lost interest in it. Then he worked in the public relations department at the Pakistan Trade Development Corporation. Bhatti later turned to his real passion - sports journalism, joining The Cricketer (magazine). Initially he used to report on the cricket club scene from Lahore. Later he became the editor of this magazine. He joined forces with Abid Ali Kazi and Nauman Badr and launched the Cricket Statistians Association. It is widely believed in Pakistan that Bhatti, during his lifetime, had built and was maintaining one of the most comprehensive database on Pakistani cricket. In 1990, Bhatti joined The News International newspaper as a sports editor.

== Personal life ==
Gul Hameed Bhatti married a fellow journalist Razia Bondray (later known as Razia Bhatti after marriage) in 1978. It turned out to be a good match and the married couple got along well with each other. The couple had two children Kamil and Sara. Razia Bhatti died in 1996 of brain haemorrhage at age 52 — reportedly caused by severe harassment, over many years, by the 3 different governments of General Zia Ul-Haq, Nawaz Sharif and Benazir Bhutto over her bold style of reporting as a journalist and continuous criticism of government policies. His wife's sudden death also took a toll on Gul Hameed Bhatti's health as he, then, had to raise two growing children by himself.

== Death and legacy ==
Bhatti suffered with ill health after the death of his wife Razia Bhatti in 1996. Razia Bhatti had also served as editor of Herald (Pakistan) magazine and later Newsline (magazine). After a battle with throat cancer, Gul Hameed Bhatti suffered a brain stroke. He died on 4 February 2010, after suffering a second stroke at age 63. He is widely considered to be a key figure who helped usher in a new era in sports journalism in Pakistan. Gul's passion for cricket rubbed off on everyone who dealt with him.
