= History of cricket in Pakistan from 1971 to 1985 =

This article describes the history of cricket in Pakistan from the 1970–71 season to 1984–85.

== Events ==
In 1970, the Ayub Trophy was rebranded as the BCCP Trophy and converted from a knockout tournament to a mini-league format whereby teams qualified for a semi-final stage by winning one of four qualifying groups. The competition's name changed again in 1973 to BCCP Patron's Trophy.

The Pentangular Trophy commenced in the 1973–74 season and the Wills Cup, Pakistan's premier limited overs competition, in 1980–81.

== National championships ==
Winners of the Quaid-i-Azam Trophy from 1971 to 1985 were:

- 1970–71 – Karachi Blues
- 1971–72 – no competition
- 1972–73 – Railways
- 1973–74 – Railways
- 1974–75 – Punjab A
- 1975–76 – National Bank
- 1976–77 – United Bank
- 1977–78 – Habib Bank
- 1978–79 – National Bank
- 1979–80 – PIA
- 1980–81 – United Bank
- 1981–82 – National Bank
- 1982–83 – United Bank
- 1983–84 – National Bank
- 1984–85 – United Bank

Winners of the BCCP (Patron's) Trophy from 1971 to 1985 were:

- 1970–71 – PIA
- 1971–72 – PIA
- 1972–73 – Karachi Blues
- 1973–74 – Railways
- 1974–75 – National Bank
- 1975–76 – National Bank
- 1976–77 – Habib Bank
- 1977–78 – Habib Bank
- 1978–79 – National Bank
- 1979–80 – IDBP
- 1980–81 – Rawalpindi
- 1981–82 – Allied Bank
- 1982–83 – PACO
- 1983–84 – Karachi Blues
- 1984–85 – Karachi Whites

Winners of the Pentangular Trophy from 1974 to 1985 were:

- 1973–74 – PIA
- 1974–75 – National Bank
- 1975–76 – PIA
- 1977–78 – Habib Bank
- 1978–79 – Habib Bank and PIA shared trophy
- 1979–80 – PIA
- 1980–81 – PIA
- 1981–82 – Habib Bank
- 1982–83 – Habib Bank
- 1983–84 – United Bank
- 1984–85 – PACO

Winners of the Wills Cup from 1981 to 1985 were:

- 1980–81 – PIA
- 1981–82 – PIA
- 1982–83 – PIA
- 1983–84 – Habib Bank
- 1984–85 – no competition

== Leading players by season ==
=== Batsmen ===
Javed Miandad

Imran Khan

=== Bowlers ===
Imran Khan

Aaqib Javed

== International tours of Pakistan ==
=== England 1972–73 ===
- 1st Test at Gaddafi Stadium, Lahore – match drawn
- 2nd Test at Niaz Stadium, Hyderabad – match drawn
- 3rd Test at National Stadium, Karachi – match drawn

=== West Indies 1974–75 ===
- 1st Test at Gaddafi Stadium, Lahore – match drawn
- 2nd Test at National Stadium, Karachi – match drawn

=== New Zealand 1976–77 ===
- 1st Test at Gaddafi Stadium, Lahore – Pakistan won by 6 wickets
- 2nd Test at Niaz Stadium, Hyderabad – Pakistan won by 10 wickets
- 3rd Test at National Stadium, Karachi – match drawn

=== England 1977–78 ===
- 1st Test at Gaddafi Stadium, Lahore – match drawn
- 2nd Test at Niaz Stadium, Hyderabad – match drawn
- 3rd Test at National Stadium, Karachi – match drawn

=== India 1978–79 ===
- 1st Test at Iqbal Stadium, Faisalabad – match drawn
- 2nd Test at Gaddafi Stadium, Lahore – Pakistan won by 8 wickets
- 3rd Test at National Stadium, Karachi – Pakistan won by 8 wickets

=== Australia 1979–80 ===
- 1st Test at National Stadium, Karachi – Pakistan won by 7 wickets
- 2nd Test at Iqbal Stadium, Faisalabad – match drawn
- 3rd Test at Gaddafi Stadium, Lahore – match drawn

=== West Indies 1980–81 ===
- 1st Test at Gaddafi Stadium, Lahore – match drawn
- 2nd Test at Iqbal Stadium, Faisalabad – West Indies won by 156 runs
- 3rd Test at National Stadium, Karachi – match drawn
- 4th Test at Ibn-e-Qasim Bagh Stadium, Multan – match drawn

=== Sri Lanka 1981–82 ===
- 1st Test at National Stadium, Karachi – Pakistan won by 204 runs
- 2nd Test at Iqbal Stadium, Faisalabad – match drawn
- 3rd Test at Gaddafi Stadium, Lahore – Pakistan won by an innings and 102 runs

=== Australia 1982–83 ===
- 1st Test at National Stadium, Karachi – Pakistan won by 9 wickets
- 2nd Test at Iqbal Stadium, Faisalabad – Pakistan won by an innings and 3 runs
- 3rd Test at Gaddafi Stadium, Lahore – Pakistan won by 9 wickets

In a supplementary One Day International series, Pakistan won the first two matches by 59 runs and 28 runs respectively, there being no result in a third match due to bad weather.

Australia also played three first-class matches against BCCP Patron's XI at the Pindi Club Ground, Rawalpindi; BCCP XI at the Ibn-e-Qasim Bagh Stadium, Multan; and Pakistan Invitation XI at the Jinnah Stadium, Sialkot. Australia won the first two matches and drew the third.

=== India 1982–83 ===
- 1st Test at Gaddafi Stadium, Lahore – match drawn
- 2nd Test at National Stadium, Karachi – Pakistan won by an innings and 86 runs
- 3rd Test at Iqbal Stadium, Faisalabad – Pakistan won by 10 wickets
- 4th Test at Niaz Stadium, Hyderabad – Pakistan won by an innings and 119 runs
- 5th Test at Gaddafi Stadium, Lahore – match drawn
- 6th Test at National Stadium, Karachi – match drawn

=== England 1983–84 ===
- 1st Test at National Stadium, Karachi – Pakistan won by 3 wickets
- 2nd Test at Iqbal Stadium, Faisalabad – match drawn
- 3rd Test at Gaddafi Stadium, Lahore – match drawn

=== India 1984–85 ===
- 1st Test at Gaddafi Stadium, Lahore – match drawn
- 2nd Test at Iqbal Stadium, Faisalabad – match drawn
- 3rd Test at National Stadium, Karachi – game abandoned; no toss was made; the game and the rest of the tour were cancelled due to the assassination of Mrs Indira Gandhi

=== New Zealand 1984–85 ===
- 1st Test at Gaddafi Stadium, Lahore – Pakistan won by 6 wickets
- 2nd Test at Niaz Stadium, Hyderabad – Pakistan won by 7 wickets
- 3rd Test at National Stadium, Karachi – match drawn

== Bibliography ==
- First Class Cricket in Pakistan (5 volumes) by Abid Ali Kazi
- Playfair Cricket Annual
- Wisden Cricketers Almanack

== External sources ==
- CricketArchive – List of Tournaments in Pakistan
