= Cricketer (disambiguation) =

A cricketer is a person who plays cricket.

Cricketer may also refer to:

- The Cricketer, a British magazine
  - The Wisden Cricketer, as it was known 2003–2011
- The Cricketer (Pakistani magazine)

== See also ==
The cricketers
