= Ilyas Sitapuri =

Pakistani writer

Ilyas Sitapuri الیاس سیتا پوری
- Born: 30 October 1934; Sitapur, United Provinces, British India
- Died: 1 October 2003 (aged 68); Karachi, Sindh, Pakistan
- Occupations: Novelist; Historical writer
- Spouse: Zia Tasneem Bilgrami
- Writing career
- Years active: 1950–2003
- Genre: Historical fiction

Ilyas Sitapuri (30 October 1934 – 1 October 2003) was a Pakistani historical fiction writer. He is known for writing historical stories for Sabrang Digest and Suspense Digest. His popular stories and novels include, Kashmir Ki Kali, Daastan-e-Hoor, Bala Khanay Ki Dulhan, and Sikandar-e-Azam.

== Early life ==
Sitapuri was born as Muhammad Ilyas Khan on 30 October 1934, in Sitapur, British India. His family belonged to the Yusufzai tribe who had migrated to Sitapur during the reign of Mughal emperor Shah Jahan. In 1952, he migrated to Pakistan and settled in Karachi.

== Writing career ==
Sitapuri started his writing career with children's stories in the late 1940s. At the age of 16, he penned his first novel, "Shakar". After coming to Pakistan, he struggled as a writer and worked for different publishing institutions. In 1970, he was introduced to Shakeel Adilzada, the editor of Sabrang Digest. Then, he wrote his first historical story for the digest, Khan-e-Azam Ka Tohfa that was published in January 1971. He continued writing for Sabrang Digest until 1974. In January 1975, he joined Suspense Digest and continuously wrote for it until his death. Sitapuri's stories and novels have also been published in India by the Shama Book Depot, (Delhi).

== Writing style ==
Sitapuri makes historical facts live with fictional characters and vivid scripts, so that the readers find themselves actually walking in the remote era. He intelligently portrays human instincts and psychology while writing about historical events.

== Personal life ==
Sitapuri was married to Zia Tasneem Bilgrami who also used to write Islamic biographies in Suspense Digest. They had 5 daughters and 3 sons. One of their daughters, Zanobia, is a performing artist and journalist.

== Popular stories/novels ==
Some famous historical stories and novels of Ilyas Sitapuri include:

- Ajaib Khana e Ishq
- Dastan E Hoor
- Haram Sara
- Raag Ka Badan
- Andar Ka Admi
- Bala Khanay Ki Dulhan
- Sikandar E Azam
- Ashna Parast
- Parsayee Ka Khumar
- Changez Khan
- Taimur Lang
- Ghulam Badshah
- Mahkoom Khaleefa
- Taj Mahal
- Khaqan e Azam
- Qaraqaram k baasi
- Farzand e Aasman
- Dasht ka Bhedia
- Bint e Hawa
- Visal e Sanam

== Death ==
Sitapuri died on 1 October 2003, in Karachi.
