= Inayatullah Khan (disambiguation) =

Inayatullah Khan was the King of Afghanistan. It may also refer to:

== People ==
- Inayatullah Khan (Indian politician)
- Inayatullah Khan (Pakistani politician)

== See also ==
- Inayatullah (disambiguation)
- Inayat Khan (disambiguation)
