= Hamdard Naunehal =

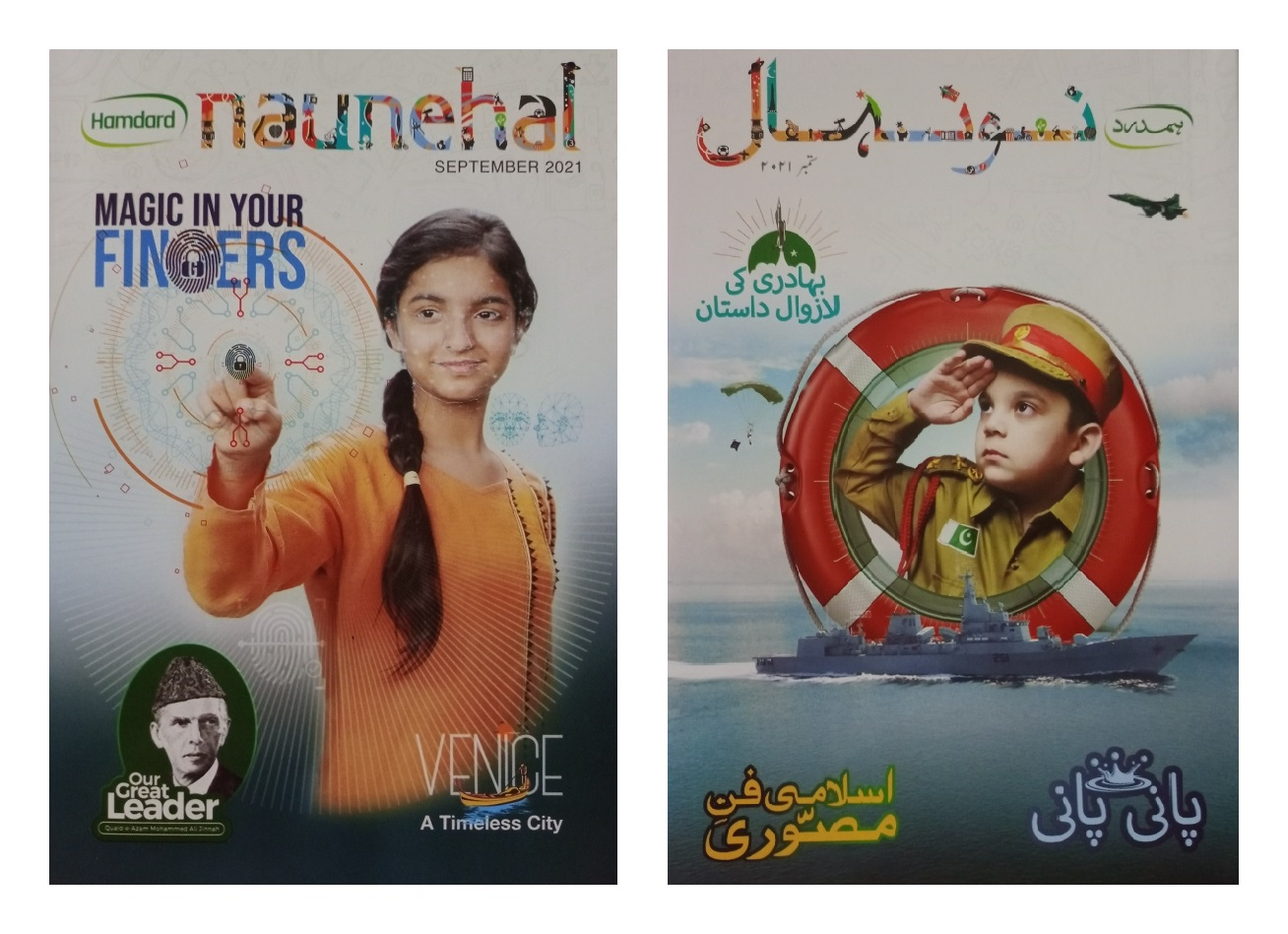
- Hamdard Naunehal - September 2021 edition
- Editor: Saleem Farrukhi
- Categories: Bilingual education
- Frequency: Monthly
- Founder: Hakim Said
- Founded: 1953
- First issue: 1953; 73 years ago
- Company: Hamdard Pakistan
- Country: Pakistan
- Language: Urdu and English
- Website: www.naunehal.com

Hamdard Naunehal (Urdu: ہمدرد نونہال) is a Pakistani kids bilingual (Urdu and English) monthly magazine first published by Hakim Said of Hamdard Laboratories, under the editorship of Masood Ahmed Barkati, in 1953. This magazine is very popular among children due to its emphasis on proper Urdu through the section "نونہال لغت", tidbits, moral & mystery stories, cartoons, and informative snippets.

== Content team ==
The current editor for the magazine is Saleem Farrukhi, while the patron-in-chief is Sadia Rashid (daughter of the late Hakim Saeed Shaheed, a philanthropist and founder of Hamdard Industries). The project head is Mohammad Arsalan, the designer is Akram Warsi, and the drawing artist was Ghazala Imam until December 2023.

The current team took over after the death of the previous editor, Masood Ahmed Barkati. The magazine keeps his memory alive by publishing articles from his time.

== Bilingual format ==
The format of the digest has not changed for long, except for the inclusion of a section entitled ھنڈکلیا, which aims at teaching basic-level cooking, until October 2020, when Naunehal was revamped into a bilingual magazine with 96 Urdu and 64 English pages.

== See also ==
- List of Urdu magazines for children
- List of magazines in Pakistan
