= Taleem-o-Tarbiat =

- Taleem-o-Tarbiat, October 2012 Edition
- Editor: Abdus salam
- Former editors: Zaheer Salam
- Categories: Children's non-fiction
- Frequency: Monthly
- Publisher: Zaheer Salam
- Founded: April 1941
- Company: Ferozsons
- Country: Pakistan
- Based in: Lahore
- Language: Urdu
- Website: www.ferozsons.com.pk

Taleem-o-Tarbiat (Urdu: تعلیم و تربیت) (in English: Education and Training) is a children's Urdu-language magazine published by Zaheer Salam of Ferozsons in Lahore, Punjab, Pakistan.

== History and profile ==
Taleem-o-Tarbiat was established in April 1941. The publisher, Ferozsons, claims it is "Pakistan's oldest" children's magazine. A 1961 edition of The Pakistan Review said "Among Urdu writers Saeed Lakht, Editor of Taleem-o-Tarbiat, is the most popular with the children." Ayasha Syeed, writing in Living Our Religions, said "I still have fond memories of Taleem-o-Tarbiat, my favorite childhood Urdu language magazine, that we received on a subscription basis. This periodical was full of stories and anecdotes that carried Sufi wisdom, adapted for children."

Common topics in magazine include: praises, Na`at, Islamic education, poetry, jokes, painting gallery, golden words, and Pakistan's history, play of 10mins, riddles.

Famous Novels Published

The famous novels published in TOT include Purisrar Naqab Posh ( A Hameed) Angothi kahan gai ( A Hameed), Mission Siachin (Saleem Khan Gummi), Churailon Kay Sarayee, Sabz Paniyon key Shehr, Raz aik ropye ka, Dhoop chaon, Gharhay me Lash, Robinson Crusoe, ghaibi insaan ( The Hollow Man) ak mandik ak ullu ( A Toad for Tuesday ) Cheekhta Khanjar, Shahnama Furdosi, Jamwaron Ki Kahani, Mehmood pr kia Beeti, Khooni Jazera (Treasure Island), Pinako k Karnamay (Pinocchio), Mera Nam Mungo hai, Barfani Insan (Saleem khan Gimmi), Raju ki kahani, etc.

Noted writers

Noted writers for the magazine have included Syed Dilawar Ali Meerza Adeeb.

== See also ==
- List of Urdu magazines for children
- List of magazines in Pakistan
