= Anokhi Kahaniyan =

- January 2015 cover
- Editor: Mehboob Elahi Makhmoor
- Former editors: Mustafa Hashmi, Rauf Aslam Araeen, Shahid Ali Sahar
- Staff writers: Elahi Bax Chisti, Noor Muhammad Hashmi, Prof Mujeeb Zafar Anwaar Hameedi, Naushad Adil and Mehboob Elahi Makhmoor
- Categories: Children's non-fiction
- Frequency: Monthly
- Publisher: Elahi Publications
- Founded: 1991
- First issue: 10 August 1991
- Country: Pakistan
- Based in: Karachi
- Language: Urdu
- Website: www.anokhikahaniyan.com

Anokhi Kahaniyan (Urdu: انوکھی کہانیاں lit. Amazing stories) is children's Urdu language magazine published from Karachi, Pakistan. Its editor is Mehboob Elahi Makhmoor.

Anokhi Kahaniyan is among the most popular children's magazines of Pakistan.

== History and profile ==
The first issue of Anokhi Kahaniyan came out on 10 August 1991. The first three issues were jointly edited by Mustafa Hashmi, Rauf Aslam Araeen, Shahid Ali Sahar and Mehboob Elahi Makhmoor, Enam Ellahi. The editorship was taken by Elahi Bax Chisti, Noor Muhammad Hashmi and Mehboob Elahi Makhmoor in December 1991. The magazine has been published and edited by Mehboob Elahi Makhmoor since 1991.

Anokhi Kahaniyan faced financial hardships during initial phase. The late Chisti, father of Makhmoor had a great financial contribution in the establishment of the magazine.

Many popular children's literature writers have been writing for Anokhi Kahaniyan. Naushad Adil is among those writers.

== Awards ==
Anokhi Kahaniyan has been awarded with the Best Magazine award for four times by UNICEF Pakistan and International Islamic University, Islamabad. National Book Foundation has also awarded the founder and editor of the magazine with appreciation certificates and price cash of Rs. 10,000 ($100) for three times. National textbook board approved the inclusion of Makhmoor's drafts in curriculum for three consecutive years.

== See also ==
- List of Urdu magazines for children
