= Pakistan Textile Journal =

Trade journal in Pakistan

- Founder: Mazhar Yusuf (1951-2009)
- Frequency: Monthly
- Publisher: Nadeem Mazhar
- Founded: 1951
- Country: Pakistan
- Based in: Karachi
- Website: http://www.ptj.com.pk

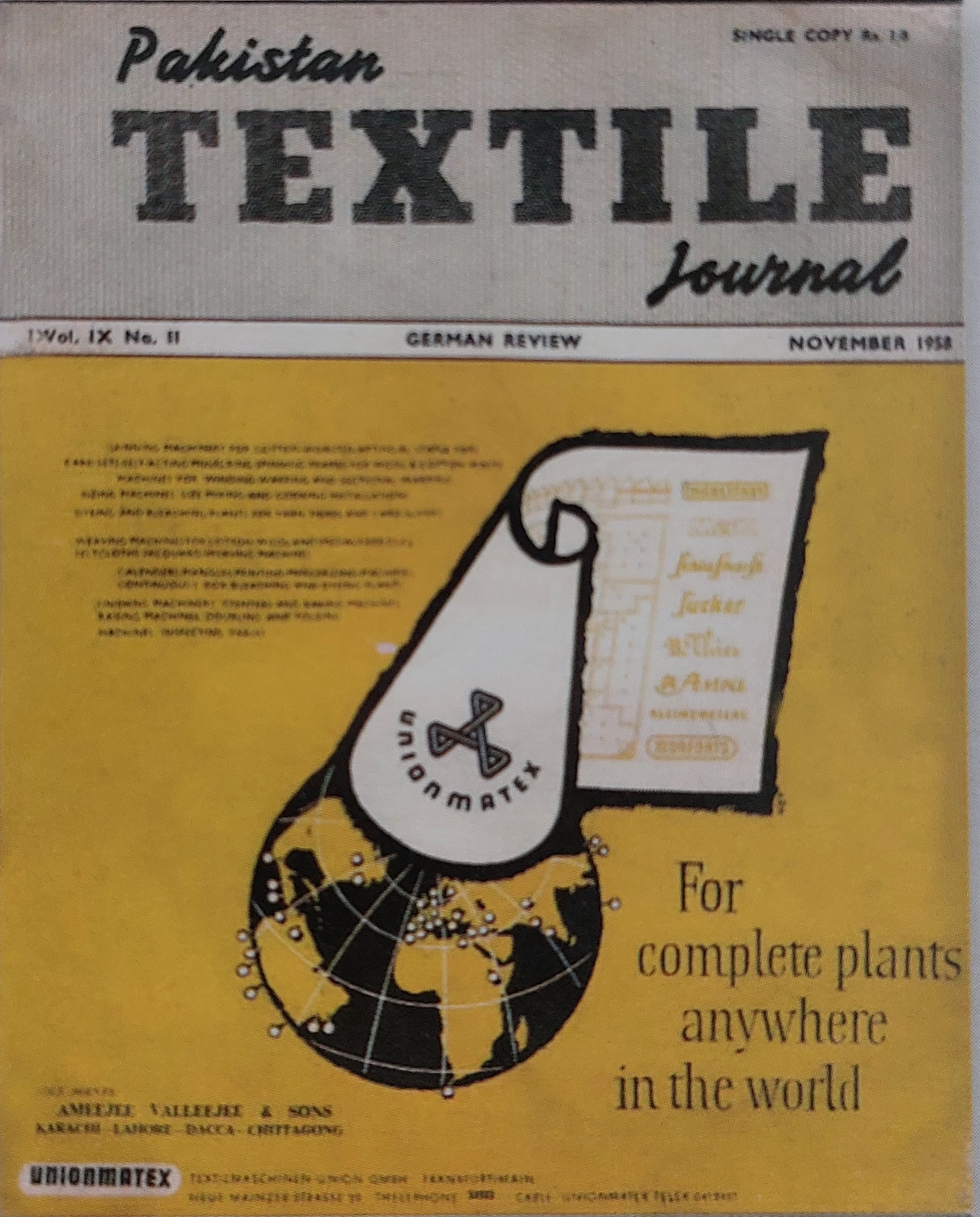
November 1958 Issue

The Pakistan Textile Journal (Urdu: ٹیکسٹاہل جرنل پاکستان) is an English-language magazine. It is the leading monthly magazine for the textile industry of Pakistan that provides valuable insight on the local and international textile affairs. The magazine is issued on a monthly basis and consists of an in depth analysis of the progress made by Pakistan and other countries of the world in textiles. Taking great pride in being one of the oldest magazines of Pakistan.

== History Of Pakistan Textile Journal ==
Pakistan Textile Journal was founded in 1951 by Mazhar Yusuf. Publishing magazines on a monthly basis since the past 70 years, it strives in providing valuable news and updates in textiles. It is based on practical experiences and latest technical innovations in the fields of fibres both natural and synthetic, spinning, weaving, knitting, non-woven, embroidery, dyeing/finishing, printing of fabrics, garments and knitwear.

Mazhar Yusuf (1925--2009) founder and publisher of Pakistan Textile journal was a veteran journalist who started his career in 1948 as a junior reporter in the newspaper, Sindh Observer. Aware of the immense potential of Pakistan's new textile industry, he started the textile trade publication in October 1951 under the name Cotton and Textile Journal. The new trade publication which was renamed later to Pakistan Textile Journal. He traveled all over the world covering various shows and events in the textile industry, he regularly contributed articles to a number of English and regional language news papers for many years. Everyone in the textile industry recognized Mr. Mazhar Yusuf as the founder of Pakistan Textile Journal, but he also started his book publishing firm, Sindh Kitab Ghar, He was also the founder-secretary and the moving spirit behind a social welfare organization, Tanzeem-e-Ahbab-e-Meerut and also the life member of Arts Council Pakistan and was also actively involved in various social causes till the last days of his life. The strong editorial team assembled by the founder has made Pakistan Textile Journal, one of the leading trade journals in the world.

== See also ==
- Textile industry in Pakistan
- All Pakistan Textile Mills Association
- List of Magazines in Pakistan
