= Newsline (magazine) =

Pakistani magazine

- Editor: Rehana Hakim
- Former editors: Razia Bhatti
- Categories: Politics and current affairs
- Frequency: Monthly
- Founded: 1989
- First issue: July 1989
- Final issue: 15 December 2019
- Company: Hum Network Limited (2014 – 2019); News Line Publications (Pvt.) Limited (1989 – 2014)
- Country: Pakistan
- Based in: Karachi
- Language: English
- Website: newslinemagazine.com
- OCLC: 1589238

Newsline was a Pakistani monthly English current affairs and political magazine owned by Hum Network. It was published from 1989 to 2019 in Karachi, Pakistan.

== History ==
Newsline was started in July 1989. Razia Bhatti (1944 – 1996), a Pakistani journalist and former editor of the Herald, was the founder editor of the magazine.

In 2014, the Hum Network acquired the magazine. In December 2019, it published its last issue and stopped publication citing "financial constraints" by the Hum Network.

== See also ==
- List of magazines in Pakistan
