= Razia Bhatti =

Pakistani journalist (1944–1996)

- Born: Razia Bondrey; 1944; Karachi
- Died: 12 March 1996 (aged 51–52); Karachi, Pakistan
- Occupation: Journalist
- Years active: 1967–1996
- Known for: Founding the staff-owned monthly magazine Newsline in Pakistan in 1989

Razia Bhatti (Urdu: رضیہ بھٹی) (born 1944 – died 12 March 1996) was a Pakistani journalist who served as editor of the Herald and Newsline magazines.

When she died at the age of 52, the Pakistan Press Foundation called it "end of a golden chapter of journalism in Pakistan." Bhatti founded staff-owned Newsline magazine with the help of other female journalists after leaving Herald magazine.

She was the editor of Pakistani magazine Herald for 12 years and then she founded Newsline and edited it for 8 years. In 1994, Bhatti received the "Courage in Journalism" award from the New York-based International Women's Media Foundation.

== Early life and education ==
Razia Bhatti was born in 1944 at Karachi. She did her master's degree in English and Journalism from Karachi University and then decided to join professional journalism as her career.

== Career ==
=== The Herald ===
Bhatti began her career in 1967, when she joined the Pakistani magazine The Illustrated Weekly of Pakistan, later renamed as The Herald and turned it into a monthly publication with focus on current and political issues. Bhatti became the assistant editor of Herald in 1970 and editor in 1976. The censorship imposed on press during General Zia-ul-Haq's martial law did not deter Bhatti and she continued reporting. "General Zia once got so infuriated that he waved a copy of her article at a press conference and said he would not tolerate such journalism," recalls Beena Sarwar in her article, Razia Bhatti and Najma Babar: Two Champions of Independent Journalism in Pakistan. After she was pressurized to write in support of the policies of General Zia Ul-Haq's regime, Razia Bhatti resigned from the magazine.

=== Newsline ===
After receiving pressure to curb her writing, most of her team of journalists resigned from The Herald along with her and together they established a new staff-owned current affairs monthly magazine called Newsline. Newsline was first published with Bhatti's editorial note in July 1989, that began:

Forty-two years down the road from independence, this nation seems to have bartered away the promise of its birth. To a whole generation of Pakistanis, fear, violence, authoritarianism and deceit represent the norm, for they have known no other. .... The press in Pakistan shares the guilt of this nation's state. It has been silent when it should have spoken, dishonest when it should have been forthright, succumbed when it should have stood fast.

The Newsline magazine under Razia Bhatti's editorship covered a number of issues including drug cartels, ethnic and fascist political parties, militant Islamic groups, a president's son-in-law, a prime minister's spouse and successive governments during her career. She broke taboos and transgressed limits imposed on freedom of expression by authoritarian regimes as well as a conservative society. Throughout her career, Bhatti was driven to present unbiased, accurate and comprehensive reports on issues affecting the people of Pakistan. She was known to champion social causes, and campaigned against Government corruption.

In December 1994, Newsline magazine published an article criticizing then Prime Minister Benazir Bhutto for her inaction in the face of random killings, looting and high crime rate in the largest city of Pakistan, Karachi. Benazir Bhutto reacted to the criticism by banning Newsline magazine from the government-owned Pakistan International Airlines flights. Nothing intimidated Razia Bhatti and her staff at the magazine Newsline, and their reporting on the shortcomings of Benazir Bhutto government continued.

== Personal life ==
Razia Bhatti was married to Gul Hameed Bhatti and had two children - Kamil and Sara. Razia Bhatti died on 12 March 1996 at age 52. She suffered from high blood pressure and died of a brain hemorrhage at her home in Karachi, Pakistan.

After her death, a noted Pakistani scholar and journalist Eqbal Ahmad wrote in his tribute to Razia Bhatti, "She will crash, I had thought then, or else she will help transform journalism in Pakistan. She did both."

== Awards and recognition ==
- The Courage in Journalism Award in October 1994 from the International Women's Media Foundation (IWMF), United States "for her extraordinary qualities in pursuing work under dangerous circumstances".

Veteran Pakistani diplomat, journalist, and now (in 2025) a frequent Pakistani news media commentator Maleeha Lodhi, who knew Razia Bhatti well, ... writes in a tribute to her:

"I remember when Razia came to New York in October 1994 to receive the courage in journalism award from the international women's foundation. She became the first Pakistani to be honoured for her extraordinary qualities in pursuing work under dangerous circumstances. Razia possessed the three c's of journalist excellence: courage, commitment and credibility".

== See also ==
- Newsline (magazine)
