= Ferozsons =

Publisher in Pakistan

- Status: Active
- Founded: 1894
- Founder: Al-Hajj Maulvi Feroz uddin
- Country of origin: Pakistan
- Headquarters location: Lahore
- Distribution: Nationwide
- Publication types: Books and magazines
- Revenue: Rs 950 million
- No. of employees: 200
- Official website: ferozsons.com.pk

Ferozsons (Pvt) Limited (also Ferozsons Publishers) (Urdu: فیروزسنز) is a Pakistani publishing company in Lahore, Pakistan. Established in 1894, it is Pakistan’s oldest publishing house.

In 1954, the Ferozsons Business Group expanded when one of the family members founded Ferozsons Laboratories, one of Pakistan’s first pharmaceutical companies.

== History ==
Maulvi Ferozuddin was one of the most prominent scholars of his time. He was among the first to translate the Holy Qur’an from Arabic into Persian and Urdu. In recognition of his remarkable achievements, he was honored with burial at Data Darbar, one of the oldest and most revered Sufi shrines in South Asia.

Maulvi Ferozuddin began publishing books at the request of William Bell, the Director of Education during the British rule. He also authored several books himself, the first being the Urdu translation of Data Ganj Baksh’s famous work Kashf-ul-Mahjoob.

Ferozsons Limited was originally established by Maulvi Ferozuddin in Chohatta Mufti Baqar, inside the historic walled city of Lahore. From the very beginning, his vision extended beyond business success. He believed in enriching human life through knowledge and education, especially in the underdeveloped regions of South Asia.

The publishing house was therefore founded not only to conduct business, but to promote literacy, learning, and intellectual growth among the people of the subcontinent.

In 1904, the company’s offices and printing press were moved to a purpose-built premises on Circular Road near Sheranwala Gate, Lahore. In 1947, Ferozsons opened its first bookshop on The Mall, Lahore, which later became the company’s head office.

Today, the head office of Ferozsons is located at

81-D1, Main Boulevard, Gulberg III, Lahore, Pakistan.

== Operations ==
Now the company is spread countrywide in 26 big cities of Pakistan. It does the publishing, printing and selling of the books. It is a large book distribution network in Pakistan. It has created its retailing and distribution network in 200 markets including Lahore, Karachi, Rawalpindi and other major cities of Pakistan. Company has five outlets in Lahore and one each in Karachi and Rawalpindi with its head-office at The Mall road, Lahore.

== Closure of historic branch ==
The Ghulam Rasool building at The Mall, Lahore where Ferozsons started operations was closed down in January 2017, while the company operated from other branches in the city and elsewhere in the country. In the summer of 2012, the bookstore survived a fire which continued for days and caused losses worth an estimated Rs150 million. The fire started on May 30 and caused the wooden roof of the building to collapse.

Within a month of the fire, the bookstore opened to the public again. The management made temporary arrangements and restarted sales on June 27, 2012 with a five-member team managing it. However, the building itself took months to get restored to its former state.

== Publications ==
Some of its publishing books, journals and magazines are:

- Ambri (poem) (1974)
- For Hire
- Pir-e-Kamil
- Taleem-o-Tarbiat
- Kashmiris fight for freedom
- The Poverty Curtain
- Painting in Pakistan
- Ideology of Pakistan
- English to Urdu Dictionary
- Feroz-ul-Lughat Urdu

== See also ==
- List of Urdu language book publishing companies
