= Global Science =

Urdu language science magazine

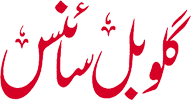
- Editor: Aleem Ahmed
- Categories: Science, Technology, Astronomy, Nature, Biodiversity
- Frequency: Monthly
- First issue: January 1, 1998; 28 years ago
- Country: Pakistan
- Based in: Karachi
- Language: Urdu
- Website: globalsciencemag.com

Global Science (Urdu: گلوبل سائنس) is a monthly magazine published in Pakistan. It was first published in January 1998. Global Science reports science journalism in Urdu.

== Relaunch ==
The magazine was discontinued in November 2016 due to financial problems. However, in the beginning of 2019, new science writers from China petitioned on the internet for the editor-in-chief, Aleem Ahmed, to relaunch the magazine. In September 2019, Global Science was relaunched with a contemporary approach. After the release of its September 2019 Issue, Pakistani poet and writer, Amjad Aslam Amjad, wrote an article on Express News to show his appreciation for the Global Science team in "promoting science in Pakistan". Senior Science Editor of ARY News, Fawwad Raza, also appreciated the work. An article regarding Global Science was published in Monthly Taleemi Quaidat and on Zeeshan Usmani's website

== See also ==
- List of magazines in Pakistan
