= Feroz-ul-Lughat Urdu =

Urdu dictionary

- Editor: Moulvi Ferozuddin
- Language: Urdu
- Genre: Dictionary
- Published: 1897 (first edition)
- Publisher: Ferozsons (Private) Limited
- Publication place: Pakistan
- Media type: Hardcover
- Pages: 1555
- ISBN: 9789690019424

Feroz-ul-Lughat Urdu Jamia (Urdu: فیروز الغات اردو جامع) is an Urdu-to-Urdu dictionary published by Ferozsons (Private) Limited. It was originally compiled by Maulvi Ferozeuddin in 1897. The dictionary contains about 100,000 ancient and popular words, compounds, derivatives, idioms, proverbs, and modern scientific, literary, and technical terms.

== Composition ==
The dictionary has been arranged and edited according to the following criteria:

- All the common words, idioms, proverbs, and modern academic, literary, scientific, and technical terms of the Urdu language have been listed.
- Only those obsolete words and idioms have been included which are found in ancient books. They are indicated by the symbol "Qaaf".
- The English words that are commonly used in Urdu have also been included.
