= Monthly Sathee =

Urdu children's monthly magazine based in Pakistan

Monthly SATHEE
- Editor: Muhammad Owais Munir
- Frequency: Monthly Magazine
- Format: Digest
- Publisher: Sarfaraz Ahmed
- Founded: 1977
- Based in: Karachi, Pakistan
- Language: Urdu
- Website: www.monthlysathee.com

The Monthly Sathee is an Urdu children's monthly magazine based in Pakistan. It is a Magazine or Digest of Pakistan in continuous publication since its foundation in 1977. Its current group editor is Muhammad Owais Munir.

== Special Numbers ==
| S.no | Title | Year and Month | Description |
|---|---|---|---|
| 1 | Imtehan number | Sept 1978 | First Special number |
| 2 | Aazadi number | Aug 1985 | |
| 3 | Computer number | July 1990 | |
| 4 | Pandarah sala number | Feb 1992 | 160 Pages |
| 5 | Aazadi e kashmir | Jul 1992 | |
| 6 | Science Special | Nov 1992 | |
| 7 | Huqooq e Atfaal | Apr 1993 | 2nd Award given by Dawah Academy |
| 8 | Jeway Pakistan | Aug 1993 | |
| 9 | Khas Bachay Khas Shumara | Mar 1994 | 1st Awqard given by Dawah Academy |
| 10 | Atfaal e Pakistan number | Mar 1997 | |
| 11 | Azam e Azadi number | Aug 1997 | |
| 12 | Bees sala number | Nov 1997 | 148 Pages |
| 13 | Maa number | Apr 1998 | |
| 14 | World cup special | Jun 1999 | 136 Pages |
| 15 | Huqooq e atfaal | Nov 1999 | |
| 16 | Sehat o Safai number | May 2000 | 136 Pages, with Puzzle gift |
| 17 | Aazadi e Kashmir | Nov 2000 | |
| 18 | Bachay Aur aman | Jul 2001 | Best Title image by Dawah Academy |
| 19 | Paschis sala number | Sep 2002 | |
| 20 | Herat naak number | Jul 2003 | |
| 21 | Jungle number | Jul 2004 | 144 Pages |
| 21B | Aazadi number | Aug 2004 | 120 Pages |
| 22 | Quaid e Azam number | Dec 2005 | 160 Pages, with Quaid's Autograph Book |
| 23 | Aalim e Islam number | Dec 2006 | |
| 24 | Tees sala number | Sep 2007 | 200 Pages, With Card game gift |
| 25 | Karnama number | Jan 2008 | 152 Pages |
| 26 | Bor number | Jun 2008 | 152 Pages with toy gift |
| 27 | Shararat number | Jul 2009 | 152 Pages |
| 28 | Science number | jun 2010 | 168 Pages |
| 29 | Tameer e Pakistan number | Aug 2011 | 168 Pages |
| 30 | Sayr sapatay number | Jul 2012 | 160 Pages |
| 31 | Bachpan number | Jun 2013 | 200 Pages |
| 32 | Pentis sala number | Nov 2013 | 240 Pages |
| 33 | Mureekh number | Jun 2014 | |
| 34 | Idea number | May 2015 | 176 Pages |
| 35 | Abbu number | May 2016 | |
| 36 | Bhool number | May 2017 | |
| 37 | Chalis sala number | Nov 2017 | 288 Pages, with puzzle game |
| 38 | Shikayat number | May 2018 | 208 Pages |

== See also ==
- List of Urdu magazines for children
- List of magazines in Pakistan
