= Masood Ahmed Barkati =

Pakistani writer (1993-2017)

- مسعود احمد برکاتی
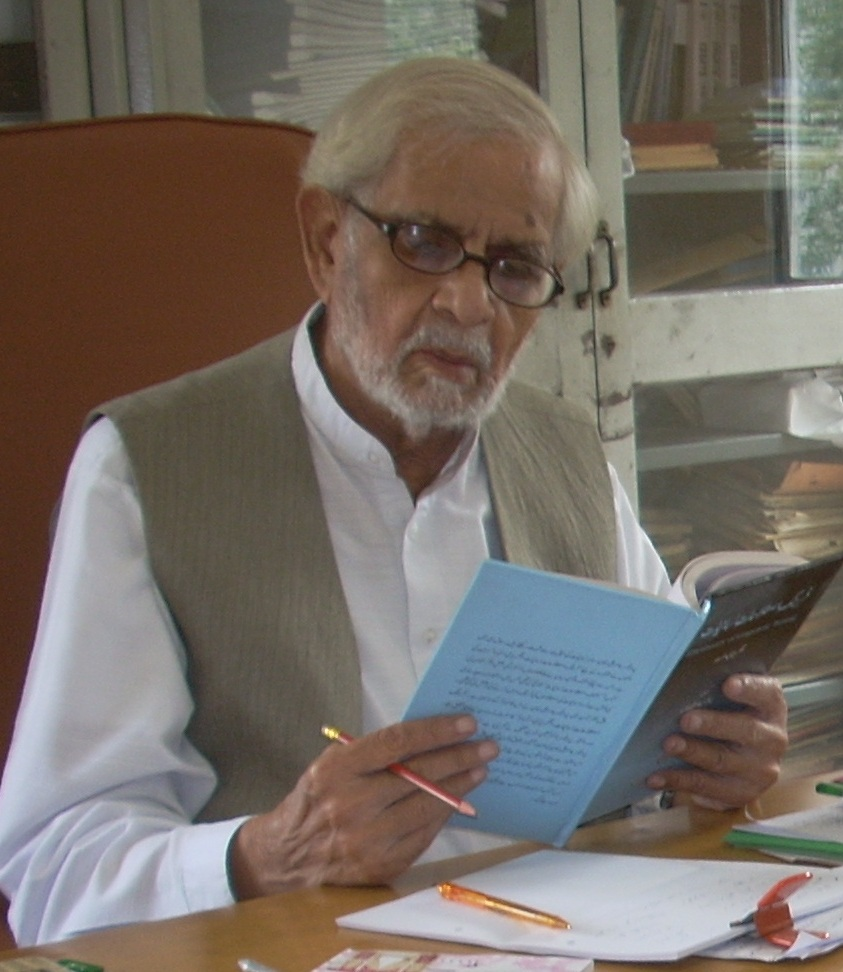
- Born: 15 August 1933; Tonk, Rajasthan, India
- Died: 10 December 2017 (aged 84); Karachi
- Occupations: Writer, editor
- Children: 4
- Relatives: Mehmood Akhtar Barkati (elder brother)
- Writing career
- Language: Urdu
- Years active: 1951–2017
- Genre: Children's literature / Editing
- Notable work: Hamdard Naunihal
- Notable awards: Address of Welcome by APNS

Masood Ahmed Barkati (Urdu: مسعود احمد برکاتی; 15 August 1933 – 10 December 2017) was a Pakistani writer and editor who was known as the editor of Hamdard Naunihal and Monthly Hamdard-e-Sehat Karachi.

== Early life ==
Masood Ahmed Barkati was born on 15 August 1933, in Tonk, current-day Rajasthan, India. His grandfather, Hakim Syed Barkaat Ahmed, was a renowned physician and religious scholar in the state of Rajasthan. His father, Hakim Mohammad Ahmed, was also an Unani medicine physician. Barkati's father died when he was hardly 2 years old. He got his earlier education from Darul Uloom Al-Khaliliah.
After partition of India in 1947, Barkati migrated alone to Pakistan while his family was still in India. Later, his elder Hakim Mehmood Akhtar Barkati brother also came to Pakistan. In the beginning, he used to be a private tutor for a living in Hyderabad, Sindh.

== Career as writer and editor ==
Barkati had a passion for writing since his childhood and started a penned journal, "Al Bakaat", at the name of his grandfather when he was still a school-going student. When he came to Pakistan, he wrote his first article, "Ishtrakiyat Kiya Hai?" (What is Communism?) in 1951 for an Urdu journal and after being encouraged by the editor, he wrote many articles on the subject of Communism, religion, and class system.
Barkati's writing career took a turn when he met Hakeem Muhammad Saeed who recruited him as a staff member in Hamdard Foundation. Later, when Hakim Saeed issued a journal for children, "Hamdard Naunihal" in 1953, he appointed Barkati as its first editor. Barkati was also editor of another health journal, "Hamdard-e-Sehat", issued under the supervision of Hakim Saeed. Barkati performed his editorial duties for both journals for the next 65 years. Barkati also served as co-editor of "Payami", an Urdu edition of UNESCO courier. Apart from writing children stories, Barkati also wrote several books for adults on the subjects of health, wellness, and time-management.

== Personal life ==
Barkati married in mid-1950s. He had three daughters and a son.

== Books ==
- Do Musafir, Do Mulak (Urdu travelogue)
- Johar-e-Qabil
- Teen Bandoqchi (Urdu translation of "The Three Musketeers")
- Monti Kristo Ka Nawab (Urdu translation of "The Count of Monte Cristo")
- Hazaron Khwahishein
- Hakeem Saeed Ke Tibbi Mashwaray (compilation)
- Mard-e-Darvesh
- Farhang Istlahaat-e-Tibb
- Ghazayein, Dawayein
- Saeed Spon (Sindhi translation)
- Mehboob Balooch
- Profile of a Humanitarian (co-author)

== Awards and recognition ==
The All Pakistan Newspapers Society presented Masood Ahmed Barkati with the Sapas Nama (Address of Welcome) as a senior professional editor on 2 March 1996.

== Death ==
After a prolonged illness, Barkati died on 10 December 2017, in Karachi.
