= Textile industry in Pakistan =

The textile industry is Pakistan's largest manufacturing sector, employing nearly 25 million people. As the eighth largest exporter of textile commodities in Asia, the industry contributes 8.5% to the country's gross domestic product.

It accounts for about 45% of the total labor force and 38% of manufacturing workers. Pakistan is the fourth-largest cotton producer and has the third-largest spinning capacity in Asia, after China and India, contributing 5% to global spinning capacity. The industry comprises 1,221 ginning units, 442 spinning units, 124 large spinning units, and 425 small units.

The Government of Pakistan oversees this sector through the Ministry of Textile Industry. However, due to the devastating floods in 2022 and the ongoing energy and foreign exchange crises, an estimated 700,000 individuals in the textile industry have lost their jobs in 2023.

== History ==
The origin of the Indian textiles is thought to be the Indus Valley Civilization, situated in the modern-day Indian Subcontinent, where people used homespun cotton to weave garments. Historically, the Indus valley region engaged in significant trade with the rest of the world. The silk from the region, for example, is known to have been popular in Rome, Egypt, Britain, and Indonesia.

In the 1950s, textile manufacturing emerged as a central part of Pakistan's industrialization, shortly following independence from the British rule in the South Asia. In 1974, the Government of Pakistan established the Cotton Export Corporation (CEC). The CEC served as a barrier to private manufacturers from participating in international trade. However, in the late 1980s, the role of the CEC diminished and by 1988-89, private manufacturers were able to buy cotton from ginners and sell in both domestic and foreign markets. Between 1947 and 2000, the number of textile mills in Pakistan increased from three to six hundred. In the same time period, spindles increased from 177,000 to 805 million.

== Production ==
There are six primary sectors of the textile production in Pakistan:

- Spinning
- Weaving
- Processing
- Printing
- Garment manufacturing
- Filament yarn manufacturing

Cotton is the largest segment of textile production. Other fibers produced include synthetic fiber, filament yarn, art silk, wool, and jute.

- Cotton: Cotton spinning is perhaps the most important segment in the Pakistan textile industry with 521 units installed and operational.
- Synthetic fibers: Within synthetic fibers, nylon, polyester, acrylic, and polyolefin dominate the market. There are currently five major producers of synthetic fibers in Pakistan, with a total capacity of 636,000 tons per annum.
- Filament yarn: Three types of filament yarn are produced in Pakistan. These are acetate rayon yarn, polyester filament yarn, and nylon filament yarn. There are currently about six units in the country.
- Artificial Silk: This fiber resembles silk but costs less to produce. There are about 90,000 looms in the country located mainly in Karachi, Faisalabad, Gujranwala, and Jalapur Jattan, as well as some in FATA.
- Wool: The main products manufactured from wool include woolen yarn, acrylic yarn, fabrics, shawls, blankets, and carpets.
- Jute: Jute sakes and hessian cloth are primarily used for packing agricultural products such as grain and rice. The production of jute products was approximately 100,000 tons in 2009-10.

== Textile production technology and skill development ==
The Textile Institute, the United Kingdom's local section for Lahore has played an extensive role in contributing to development of skill improvement and technology sharing through its various training and latest knowledge sharing platforms.

== Trade ==
Textiles comprise 57% of Pakistan's export revenues. However, in recent years, textile exports have declined significantly. Textile exports were recorded at $11.625 billion in 2014-2015. In 2015-2016, this number had dropped 7.7% to $10.395 billion.

The Pakistan Textile Exporters Association recently requested the government to take significant measures to ensure the growth of textile exports and sustain the employment provided by the sector. Specifically, the PTEA has requested:

- Zero rating on export value chain (i.e. no tax, no refund) to boost export growth
- Subsidize a decrease in cost of production to boost competitiveness of Pakistani exports
- Guarantee energy supply to textile mills at competitive rates

Furthermore, the Pakistan Textile Mills Association has demanded that the removal of duty on cotton imports and a rebate of five percent on textile exports. This plea has come at a time with about 110 mills have been shut down due to various barriers to growth including the energy crisis.

== Barriers to growth ==
In recent years, Pakistan has faced competition from regional players including Bangladesh, India and Vietnam. In the past decade, Pakistan's share in global textile market decreased to 1.7 percent from 2.2 percent, Bangladesh saw an increase from 1.9 to 3.3 percent and India from 3.4 to 4.7 percent. Barriers to growth include:

- Cost of production: The rising cost of production in the country has stalled investment as well as export competitiveness. A vertical shift in monetary policy and KIBOR rates have contributed to an increase in the cost of doing business and reduced lending abilities of local manufacturers.
- Energy Crisis: Pakistan is currently facing a large-scale energy crisis. Due to energy demand exceeding supply by about 5000 MW. The government manages the deficit through daily power cuts (or blackouts). These power cuts have significantly impacted manufacturing industries in Pakistan. Several textile mills have closed their units due to inability to sustain operations. In addition, the mills have reportedly turned away export orders due to the inability to fill these orders when power cuts per day can last upwards of 12 hours.
- Research and Development: There has been a limited effort to improve the quality and quantity of textiles in Pakistan through research and development, limiting the competitiveness of Pakistan's textiles in the global market.

== Labor rights ==
The textile industry is the second largest employment sector in Pakistan. Labor costs are estimated to be about five to eight percent of total cost while import income of the sector is estimated to be about $12.5 billion in 2010-11. Textile mill owners have often complained that labor costs are "too high" while workers continue to be underpaid and over utilized. Factories often do not issue letters of employments to workers and therefore can easily fire them without legal consequences. Furthermore, safety and security remains a significant issue at textile, where there are limited checks on exhaust systems, light systems, and waste water disposal. This dire state of affairs of labor rights comes in sharp contrast to the growing Pakistan fashion industry, which mainly serves the country's elites.

== See also ==
- Economy of Pakistan
- Foreign trade of Pakistan
- Pakistan Textile Journal
- Textile manufacturing
