= Balchand =

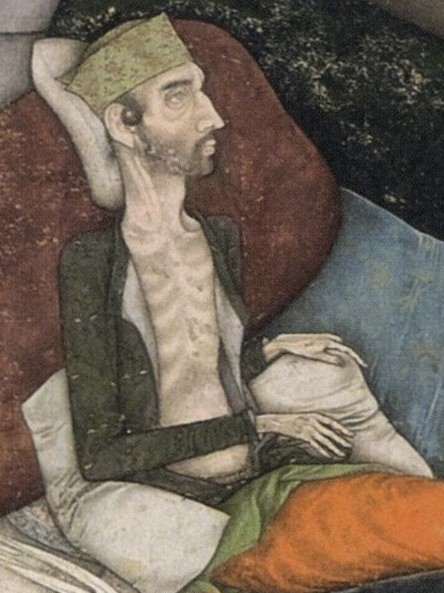
The Death of Inayat Khan by Balchand

Balchand (active from c.1595-c.1650) was a major Indian Hindu artist of Mughal painting, in the 17th century. He was noted for the dark realism of his paintings, a style he shared with his famous brother, the painter Payag. He was proficient in individual portraits and manuscript illustrations, his work was known for his empathetic quality and elegant detailing, like The Death of Inayat Khan.

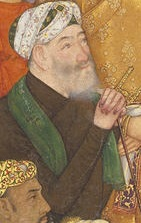
Detail of Rustam Mirza Safavi in Jahangir Receives Prince Khurram at Ajmer on His Return from the Mewar Campaign, circa 1635, part of the Padshahnama

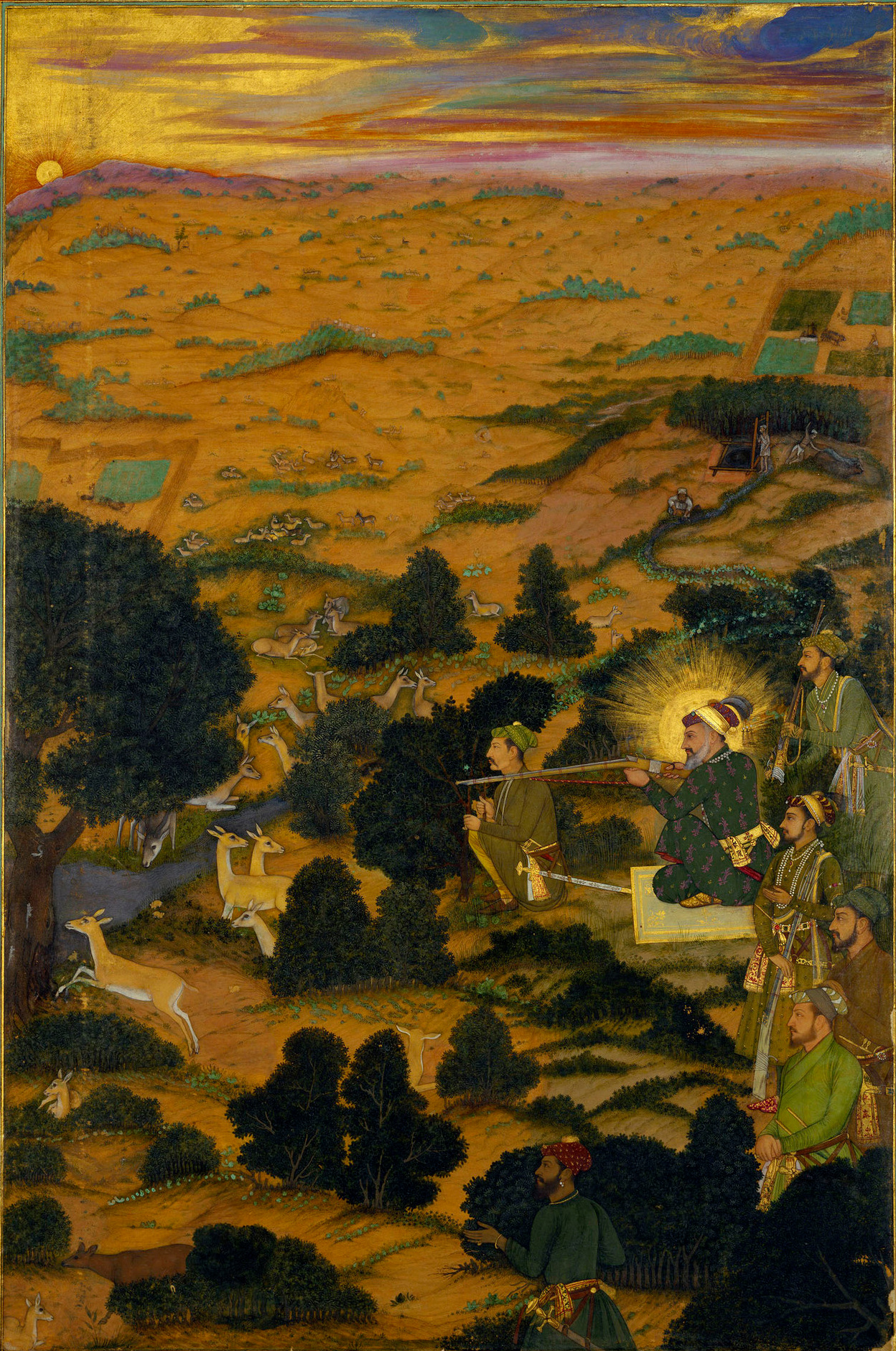
Shah Jahan on the hunt

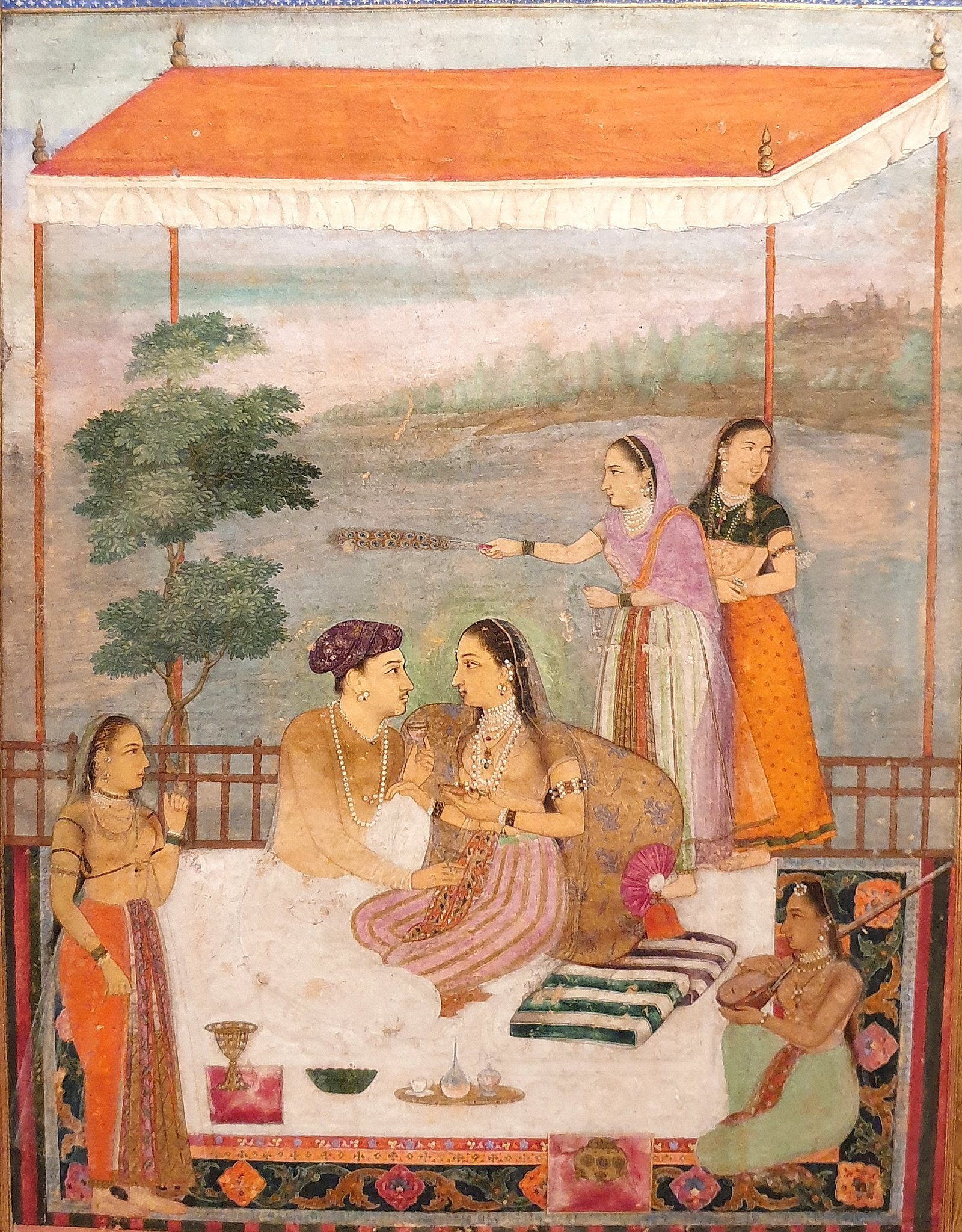
Royal Lovers on a Terrace, ca 1633
