= Kiran Digest =

Pakistani Urdu magazine

- Staff writers: Nabeela Aziz, Fozia Yasmeen, Shagufta Bhatti etc
- Categories: Literary magazine
- Frequency: Monthly
- Publisher: Karachi
- Country: Pakistan
- Language: Urdu

Kiran Digest (Urdu: کرن ڈائجسٹ) is a Pakistani monthly publishing novel and a fictional digest from Karachi. It is a family magazine which publishes social and romantic stories, especially for women.

== See also ==
- List of magazines in Pakistan
