= Lehran =

Pakistan-based magazine

Lehran لہراں ਲਹਿਰਾਂ
- Editor(s): Irfan Akhtar; Kulsom Akhtar
- Categories: Literary magazine
- Frequency: Monthly
- Founder: Syed Akhtar Hussain Akhtar
- First issue: March 1965; 61 years ago
- Country: Pakistan
- Based in: Lahore
- Language: Punjabi

The Lehran (Punjabi: لہراں or ਲਹਿਰਾਂ, 'waves'), also referred to as Monthly Lehran, is a Pakistan-based magazine published monthly from Lahore in Shahmukhi Punjabi, with Gurmukhi transliterations. It is a literary magazine—of particular interest to university students—started by Syed Akhtar Hussein Akhtar, a Punjabi Language Movement activist, in March 1965 and is associated with the Modern Punjabi College in Old Anarkali.

Monthy Lehran started the practice of publishing content in both the Punjabi scripts, which has been praised for promoting a composite Punjabi culture and bridging the cultural divide between Pakistani and Indian Punjab. The practice has been co-opted by various other Punjabi writers from Pakistan.

It is presently managed by Akhtar's children, Irfan and Kulsom Akhtar.

== Background ==
=== Origins ===
The Lehran was founded by Syed Akhtar Hussein Akhtar, a pioneer in the Punjabi Language Movement, in March 1965 under the mentorship of Faqir Muhammad and noted Punjabi writers Abdul Hameed Amar, Hakeem Sher Muhammad Nasir and Khizar Tameemi. The cover of the first issue of the magazine was designed by painter, and later politician, Hanif Ramay. Lehran was attached with the Modern Punjabi College in Old Anarkali—also founded by Akhtar—and students were required to subscribe to the magazine. Students also helped out with office affairs.

According to Dawn, the Lehran filled the void for a Punjabi literary magazine for college students in Lahore created after the death of Chaudhary Muhammad Afzal, another educationist, who had also previously mentored Akhtar. In its early days, the Lehran published articles mainly related to the curricula of Akhtar's college and other general literary ones in Punjabi.

=== Gurmukhi transliteration ===
The Lehran was initially published in Shahmukhi, the Perso-Arabic script used for writing Punjabi in the Punjab Province of Pakistan. Shortly before 2005, Monthly Lehran started to transliterate its articles to Gurmukhi—the Punjabi script used in Indian Punjab. It was a pioneer in this field, which was appropriated by many other Pakistani writers.

The Lehran was praised for bridging a socio-cultural and religious divide between Pakistani and Indian Punjab by publishing content in both scripts used for the Punjabi language and for promoting a composite Punjabi culture. Akhtar also began to teach the Gurmukhi abugida to readers in Pakistani Punjab through instruction in the Lehran.
