= Monthly Pukheroo =

Pakistani children's magazine

- Editor: Ashraf Sohail
- Categories: Children's Magazine
- Frequency: Monthly
- Founded: 1995
- Company: Punjabi Bal Adabi Board
- Country: Pakistan
- Based in: Lahore
- Language: Punjabi

Monthly Pukheroo is a children's magazine published in Pakistan. It is published in the shahmukhi alphabet of the Punjabi language. The magazine includes stories, poems, stories, rhymes, riddles, songs, and lullabies for children. Ashraf Sohail is the current editor, with contributions from Abdul Ghafoor Khan, Sohail Qaiser Hashmi, and Ali Akmal Tasawwar. Art is contributed by JS Deep. The magazine temporarily went out of business in 2005, but was revived with financial assistance from the government of Punjab. The magazine is also distributed in the United States and Canada.
