= The Death of Inayat Khan =

1618 painting by Balchand

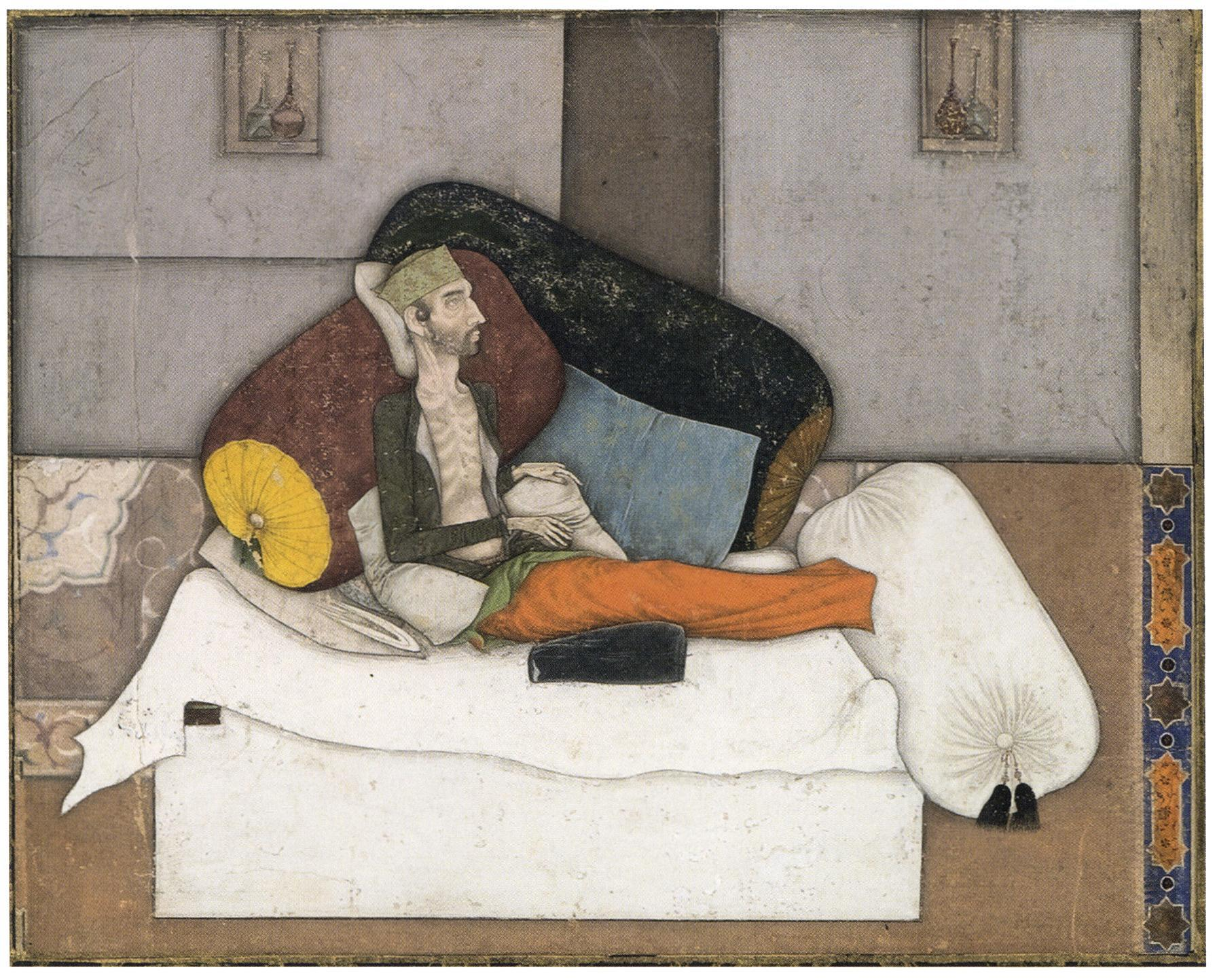
- Artist: Balchand
- Year: 1618
- Location: Bodleian Library

The Death of Inayat Khan is a Mughal miniature painting by the artist Balchand, commissioned in the 17th century by the Mughal emperor Jahangir.

== Background ==
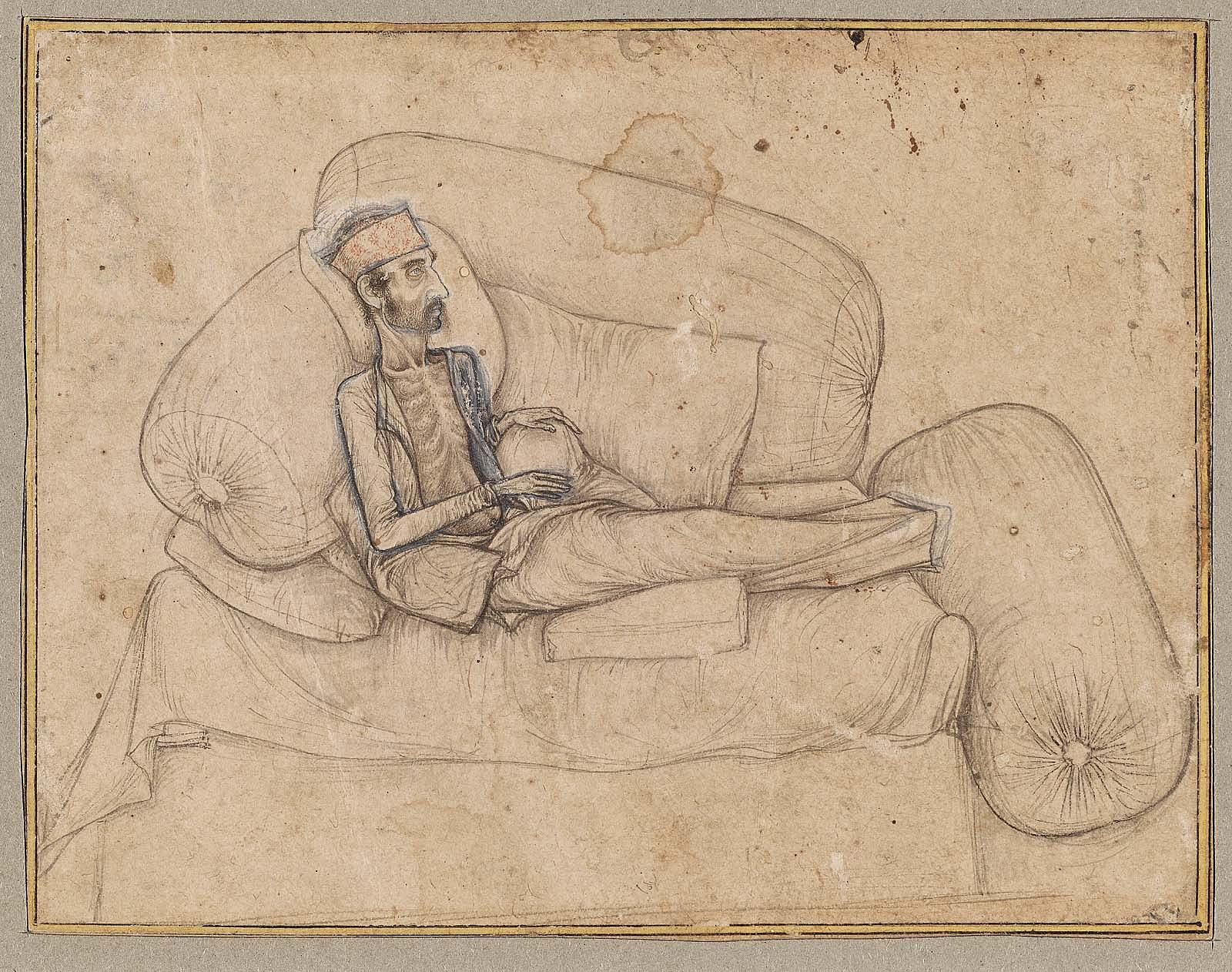
The preliminary drawing upon which the painting is based

In his autobiography, the Jahangirnama, the emperor Jahangir identifies Inayat Khan as "one of my closest servants and subjects" and provides a brief overview of his final days, and how the painting came to be. Described as being addicted to opium and wine, he eventually developed diarrhea and was also affected by frequent seizures. Following this, he developed an extreme appetite. Ultimately, he became afflicted with cachexia and oedema, becoming extremely weak. Although the emperor ordered a hakim to treat Khan, the treatment proved to be of no avail.

During the course of his illness, Khan requested permission from the emperor to depart for his hometown, the city of Agra. The emperor ordered him to appear personally before him, and as such, he was brought to the emperor in a palanquin. The emperor, greatly astonished at Khan's emaciated state, ordered the court artists to depict his likeness. The emperor advised Khan to focus on Dhikr or remembrance of God, and granted him leave, along with a thousand rupees for the journey. Khan died the next day, on 10 October 1618.

This painting is attributed to the court artist Balchand, as an inscription on the painting reads "the work of Balchand, the servant of the court". The preliminary drawing, upon which the painting is based, also survives, and is now in the Museum of Fine Arts Boston.

== Description ==
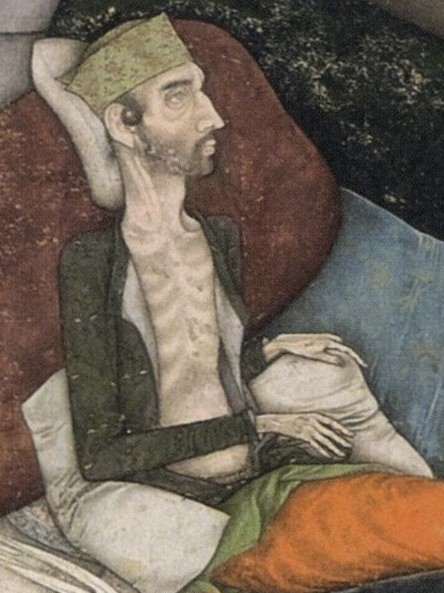
Khan is wearing an unbuttoned jama, revealing his ribcage.

Inayat Khan is in an emaciated state, resting upon a charpai, gazing into empty space with a blank expression. He is lying with his legs straight, but his torso upright, propped up by two bolsters and several smaller pillows that are placed behind his head, back, elbows, and beneath his knees. A third bolster is placed underneath his feet. The painting depicts that even at the end of his life and strength, Khan attempts to follow the courtly manner, with his torso upright and eyes straight ahead, displaying obeisance to the emperor.

He is wearing an open dark green jama that reveals his prominent ribcage, and a salmon-coloured salwar that is held up by a bow-tied drawstring. He is also wearing a green cap.

In the background is a bluish wall, that has two niches containing bottles, on either side of a dark doorway.
