= Abid Ali Kazi =

Pakistani cricket statistician and historian

Abid Ali Kazi

Abid Ali Kazi (Urdu: عابد علی قاضی), born in Karachi, Pakistan on 20 July 1961, is a cricket statistician and historian. His involvement with the game of cricket dates back to the mid-1970s. Realizing that his cricket playing abilities would not take him to the highest level, he focused on writing, statistical analysis and research. He has hands-on experience in the non-playing aspects of the game, including editorial contribution, archives, statistics, history, scoring, organizing, publishing and sponsoring.

Abid Ali Kazi's major contribution to cricket is compiling the history of Pakistan's domestic cricket. He collected, corrected and published scorecards of first-class matches played in Pakistan which remained largely undocumented till the 1990s. Kazi's efforts appear as five volumes in the series First-Class Cricket in Pakistan, which covers the period 1947–48 to 1974–75.

He was declared Statistician of the Year by the Association of Cricket Statisticians and Historians in 2004. Kazi co-founded the Pakistan Association of Cricket Statisticians and Scorers with the late Gul Hameed Bhatti in 1983. He has been the Pakistan correspondent of Wisden Cricketers' Almanack since 1987. Besides appearing on different TV channels as cricket expert, he co-hosted a popular weekly cricket show, The Blazing Strokes on AAJ TV in 2007.

Abid Kazi was Managing Editor and Publisher of The Cricketer International, Asian Edition from March 1990 to February 1995. He has written on cricket extensively in national and international publications and has authored a number of books on the statistical history of Pakistan cricket.

He served as the General Manager Marketing of the Pakistan Cricket Board in 2001–02.
