= Sabrang Digest =

Defunct Pakistani Urdu digest

- Sabrang Digest (cover) October 1975
- Editor-in-chief: Shakeel Adilzada
- Frequency: Monthly
- Format: Digest
- First issue: January 1, 1970
- Final issue: 2007
- Country: Pakistan
- Based in: Karachi
- Language: Urdu

Sabrang Digest (Urdu: سب رنگ ڈائجسٹ) was a Pakistani Urdu digest which was in circulation from 1970 to 2007

== History and profile ==
Sabrang Digest was founded on January 1, 1970 by Shakeel Adilzada. The earliest editorial team included Shafique Hassan (editor-in-chief), Shakeel Adilzada (editor), and Hassan Hashmi (associate editor). After its first issue, Sabrang Digest made an immediate impact and its circulation reached 0.15 million. The digest published stories from notable Urdu writers like, Ahmed Nadeem Qasmi, Rajinder Singh Bedi, Ilyas Sitapuri, and many others.

After being irregular in publication for some years, Sabrang eventually discontinued in 2007.

== Popular story books ==
Sabrang published a number of popular episodic stories that have been later compiled in book form:

- Ghulam Roohein
- Aqabala
- Sona Ghaat Ka Pujari
- Inka
- Baazigar
- Ambarbail
- Sab Rang Kahaniyan

== See also ==
- List of magazines in Pakistan
