= Mohiuddin Nawab =

Pakistani novelist (1930–2016)

Mohiuddin Nawab محی الدین نواب
- Born: 4 September 1930; Kharagpur, West Bengal, British India
- Died: 6 February 2016 (aged 85); Karachi, Pakistan
- Occupations: Novelist; screenwriter; poet
- Children: 13
- Writing career
- Years active: 1953–2016
- Genres: Romantic literature, Realistic Fiction, Paranormal fiction
- Notable works: Devta (novel), published in Suspense Digest

Mohiuddin Nawab (Urdu: محی الدین نواب) (4 September 1930 – 6 February 2016) was a Pakistani novelist, screenwriter, and poet. He is famous for his popular novel series, "Devta" that was episodically and continuously published in Suspense Digest from February 1977 to January 2010. Devta is the autobiography of a fictional character, Farhad Ali Taimur, who is a master of telepathy, chain smoker, and a womaniser.
Apart from Devta, Nawab wrote nearly 600 romantic, social, spy, and historical short/novel-length stories for renowned digests like, Jasoosi Digest, and Suspense Digest. Some of his notable stories include Kachra Ghar, Iman Ka Safar, Khali Seep, and Adha Chehra. A collection of his poetry and prose has been published under the title, "Do Tara". Nawab also wrote scripts for a few movies including, "Jo Darr Gya Woh Marr Gya" (1995).

== Early life and family ==
Mohiuddin Nawab was born on 4 September 1930, in Kharagpur, West Bengal, British India. Nawab passed his matriculation examination in his native city, Kharagpur. After partition in 1947, he migrated to Dhaka, East Pakistan (now Bangladesh). Then, after the fall of East Pakistan in 1971, he migrated along with his family for the second time to Karachi, Pakistan. He belonged to an Urdu-speaking family. His grandfather was an interior decorator and his father an official painter in the Railways department. During his stay in Dhaka, Nawab used to prepare banners and hoardings for cinema halls for a living.

== Literary career ==
Nawab initially started writing romantic stories with a female pen name. At the age of 23, his first story, "Ek Deewar, Ek Shagaf", with his own name was published in a film magazine, "Romaan", in around 1970. After going through a struggling period as a writer, he finally got attention of the Suspense Digest's editor, Maraj Rasool. Then he became a regular writer for Suspense and Jasoosi Digest for the next 40 years.
Nawab was a friend of the poet and paranormal researcher Rais Amrohvi, and getting inspired by Rais's books on telepathy and hypnotism, he conceived the idea of Devta with a fictional character, Farhad Ali Taimoor. He started writing Devta in February 1977 and soon it became the most popular digest story. The readers used to wait for its next episode. Devta raised the monthly sale of Suspense Digest greater than any of its rival digest and Nawab became the most busy writer of the era. The novel Devta continued for 33 continuous years, ending in 396 episodes. Later it was published in book form in 53 volumes. With 11,206,310 word count, Devta stands in the list of longest novels in history.
Nawab wrote over 600 romantic and social stories, mostly for the Suspense Digest. These short stories have been compiled into nearly 200 books.

== Writing style and themes ==
Romance and social issues are the main themes of Nawab's writings. His take on life reveals a sharp and critical eye that mercilessly exposes the naked truths of society. Creative metaphors and witty phrases were his strongest weapons. He was quite aware of men's hard nature, women's soft psychology, and duplicity of human society in general and he used this insight in his writings in a unique and exceptional way. Even while writing fiction, his feet never left the ground of reality. He merged fiction and facts in a style only a few writers could even try. His characters are the familiar faces that readers observe around them. His stories usually take place in the ordinary settings of everyday life. He puts words of social wisdom in the mouths of laypersons like a worried father, a caring mother, a jobless young man, a maiden girl waiting for a marriage proposal, a hardworking laborer, a motor mechanic, a clergyman (molvi), etc.

== Personal life ==
Nawab had three wives and 13 children.

== List of works ==
=== Devta ===
- 56 volumes

=== Romantic and social novels ===
- Aanchal
- Aik Raat Ki Malika
- Shajr e Mamnoa
- Be Torh
- Admi ka Bap
- Kharedar e Wafa
- Band Mothee
- Rooh Ki Wapsi
- Jalwa Numai
- Aatish Qadam
- Doosra Ghaao
- Sacha Fareb
- Sehr Shab Gazida
- Eman Wale
- Aadha Chehra
- Aafat Jahan
- Baasi Phool
- Marvi
- Wapsi
- Naik kamai
- Tilism e Mohabbat
- Azab E Agahi
- Zahreela Phool
- Youm e Hisab
- Taeoon
- Situm Zada
- Tang Amad
- Silver Jublee
- Short Cut
- Shan e Bandagi
- Nayk Kamye
- Shahina
- Qaid E Hayat
- Seh Zor Sheh Zor
- Sapne Sab Apne
- Rishton Ki Baazi
- Rah e Kharzar
- Qadeem Rishta
- Pathar Ka Sheesha
- Nisf Sadi ka Qissa
- Pathar
- Pul Sraat
- Nausar Baz
- Muqaddar
- Mohabbat Ka Azab
- Kashish Lazawaal
- Lahu ka bojh
- Mamta Ka Azab
- Mausam
- Khosh Damini
- Khof E Khuda
- Kala Dil Wala
- Kambal
- Karobar e Wirasat
- Imaan Ka Safar
- Kachra Ghar
- Kachche Rishtey
- Admi Ka Baap
- Joray ka Phool
- Jannat e Nishan
- Inteha
- Hind Se Yunan Tak
- Grift
- Haya Ki Sooli Per
- Insan or Shaitan
- Elaaj
- Door Andesh
- Dil Paara Paara
- Casion
- Chilman
- Bodhi Mehboobah
- Biradri
- Be Misaal
- Bandish
- Bay Naam Rishtey
- Badast e Zindah
- Azab e Aakhir
- Badi Ul Jama
- Anhoni
- Ankh Macholi
- Andher Nagri
- Andhi Chaal
- Akhri Mousam
- Akhir Wada
- Ajnabi Mahboob
- Afat Jahan
- Ajal Naamaa
- Adhoora Adhoori
- Abla Badan
- Madawa

=== Novels adapted into TV plays ===
- Aadha Chehra
- Sarparast

=== Poetry ===
- Do Tara

=== Film scripts ===
- Jo Darr Gya Woh Marr Gya (1995)

== Death ==
Nawab died on 6 February 2016, in Karachi.
