= Choudhry Inayatullah =

Pakistani journalist (1922–?)

- Born: Inayat Ullah; 1922; Medhi Mohalla, Gojra, Punjab, India
- Died: Lahore, Pakistan
- Occupations: Journalist; editor
- Notable credit: Founding editor of Daily Mashriq
- Children: 1

Choudhry Inayatullah (Urdu: عنایت اللہ; born 1922) was a Pakistani senior journalist. He was the founding editor of the Daily Mashriq newspaper.
