= Devta (novel) =

Urdu fiction novel

Devta (Novel)
- Author: Mohiuddin Nawab
- Language: Urdu
- Genre: Crime, Mystery, Adventure Thriller Fantasy
- Publisher: Kitaabiyat Publication
- Publication place: Pakistan
- Media type: Print (hardcover, paperback)

Devta (Urdu: دیوتا deotā, "deity") is a serialized fantasy thriller novel written in the Urdu language by Mohiuddin Nawab. It was published monthly for 33 years in the Pakistani magazine Suspense Digest from February 1977 to January 2010. Devta is the fictional autobiography of Farhad Ali Taimoor, a man who gained telepathic powers.

The author Mohiuddin Nawab, a well-known social story writer of Pakistan, has written more than 500 stories, both short stories and novel-length, mostly published in Suspense Digest, a monthly magazine published in Karachi and available in Pakistan, India, and elsewhere in the world where Urdu is spoken. He has also written screenplays for film and television.

Spanning 49 volumes and an estimated 2,450,000 words, (9,800,000 estimated characters with and without spaces. 6898.1 Pages) Devta is the longest continuously published story on record. It was started in February 1977 and appeared every month in Suspense Digest, with its concluding chapter published in January 2010.

== Plot ==
It is a story starting with a teenage boy living in Shahdara town on the outskirts of Lahore, Pakistan. The story has been written by Mohiuddin Nawab under the pseudonym Farhad Ali Taimoor as a fictional autobiography. The title of the story is given as "Devta" arising from the Hindi language which stands for "god" or earthly god in the Hindu religion. He is described as Devta because of his mind control powers gained through telepathy. He fights with the group of Super Master, Mask Man and underworld mafias other criminal mind people and groups in different stages, and a battle rages moving from continents and islands and into government circles and private power broker homes. The story is a multiple of stories where Farhad is faced with opponents at every stage and in various forms. Farhad in the beginning starts as a novice but soon he is confronted by the U.S. spy agency "Super Master" group. The Super Master is an underground powerful mega boss working for the U.S. interests worldwide and he virtually controls the U.S. military, civilian government, and financial top men. It is the top spy agency with a global network of crime, terror, intrigue, conspiracy, and drug control. The Super Master agency is the top-secret agency. Another rival is the Mask Man organization which originated from Russia. Mask Man has one leader in each country who is called Boss. Unfortunately, as the story progresses, both these organizations disappeared from the story and new enemy organizations enter. Farhad initially had Sonia, a fighter as his wife and later marries a number of other girls. He also had 2 sons. Baba Sahib Sanctuary in Paris is a safe heaven for him whenever he is defeated or injured. The novel is widely loved by people across the globe.

== Characters ==
1. Farhad Ali Taimoor: The telepathic main character
2. Madam Sonia: A former member of Master Group. She came to Pakistan to kill Farhad, but she fell in love with him and became his right hand and his wife.
3. Fride Wascour AKA Baba Fareed Wasti: He is the founder of an institute of theoretical and practical psychology, also known as the Baba sahab institute. He has a twin brother who is revealed later in the novel.
4. Sheikh-ul-Faras Ghulam Hussain-al-Burqi: A wise man with spiritual powers. He became the leader of the Baba Sahab Institution after the death of Baba Fareed Wasti, who started the Institution. He died in Volume 22 of the series.
5. Ali Asad-Ullah Tibrezi He obtained leadership of the Baba Sahab Institution after the death of Sheikh-ul-Faras.
6. Rasvanti / Aamina Farhad: Farhad's wife, originally from India also acquired telepathy.
7. Laila Sheikh, Farhad's wife, a telepath, and Sheikh-ul-Faras Ghulam Hussain-al-Burqi's daughter
8. Salman Wasti AKA Super Master Aaree ree: A student of Baba Fareed wasti who gained telepathy
9. Sultana Sheikh: Wife of Salman wasti, a telepath, and sister of Laila Farhad
10. Raheela AKA Mama heela: Salman wasti's first wife. She is a witch along with her mother and grandmother. She is the daughter of Baba Fareed Wasti's.
11. Sania AKA Sonia Sani: Daughter of Salman and Raheela. She gained telepathic skills from a transformer machine. Afterward, she married Paras Ali Temor.
12. Romana: She was Farhad's love interest. A very good fighter and also a good gymnast. She was killed by a suicide bomber unit (Kali Ballaein) of Super Master Group.
13. Marjana: She was Farhad's love interest. She was a very good fighter and practitioner of martial arts, trained by Master Watso Roki. She was killed in Kaaf Valley when Super Master attacked there.
14. Aahla Bibi: She was Farhad's love interest. Very intelligent girl from Baba Sahab Institution. She was leader of spy group of institution named Aalla Bibi & 40 Thieves which has forty members, who are the best spies, and Aahla Bibi was the leader. She died of gunfire wounds in Volume 22 of the series while he was with Ali Taimoor, helping him to rescue his mother from the captivity of Super Master.
15. Manjali: She was Farhad's love interest. A poisonous girl from Africa was educated at Baba Sahab Institution. She was killed by Farhad's enemies with help of black magic.
16. Mambasi
17. Rabi Asfand Yar: He was the respected spiritual leader of Jews. A person who was a yoga master and got hypnotism skills. Very strong hypnotist, plan-maker, and enemy of Farhad.
18. Maria: She was Paras's love interest. A poisonous girl with a father from England and a mother from an African tribe. She was kept under custody and training by the black magic witch of that tribe, from her birth who made her poisonous. She also made Paras poisonous when he visited the tribe during a battle with his enemies...
19. Sabata: She was Farhad's love interest. She was a princess of Kaaf Valley. She was a very good fighter and horse rider. She was killed in Kaaf Valley when Super Master attacked there.
20. Sheeba: A Jewish girl who also has telepathy skills. She was an enemy of Farhad but later fell in love with him and became a member of his telepathy team. She later kills herself.
21. Pamilla (Nickname = Poomi): She is Farhad's love interest. Very good fighter and also a good gymnast.
22. Master Watso Roki: Japanese teacher of Martial Arts at Baba Sahab Institution who trained Marjana, Pamilla, Paras-I & II & other students of the institute
23. Paras Ali Taimoor-I: known as Paras
24. Paras Ali Taimoor-II Known as Ali Taimoor. originally the son of Ali Asad-Ullah Tibrezi.
25. Puras: Para's twin Brother is revealed in the 38th volume. He was given to a Hindu Family by his maid immediately after birth. Just before the disclosure in the last chapter, his maid (i.e. Lady Rosana) reveals this secret act of her performed 25 years ago on Jazira Al Bird.
26. Super Master: This is the code name of a leader of the Super Master group of the United States. Super Master is controlled by the U.S. government.
27. Mask Man: This is the code name of the leader of the Red power group of Russia. Red power is controlled by the Russian government.
28. Master Youshay: He was master of Super Master Group, a government agency built for crime and enslaving other countries by any means. He was also a telepathy master but was killed by Farhad Ali Taimoor. Later his son became Super Master got telepathy skills with help of Transformer Machine and tried to take revenge on his father from Farhad Ali Taimoor, but was killed.
29. Armor: An intelligent mechanic and scientist, he invented transformer machines along with his brothers, Harper & Sharper, and sisters, Madam Rozina and Jenepher, also known as JoJo.
30. JoJo: The youngest sister of Armor and the wife of Farhad's son Paras
31. Tartar Bilba: He was an enemy of Farhad, from the Super Master group but later joined his team. He was the prince of Kaaf Valley. He was a very good fighter and horse rider. He was killed in Kaaf Valley when Super Master attacked there.
32. Tartar Ghilba: The king of Kaaf Valley, he was killed in Kaaf Valley when Super Master attacked there.
33. Master Danial: He is known as "Aaag Ka Devta" (God of Fire).
34. Cheetal & Sheetal: Twin dumb brothers from India who were sent to kill Farhad but later were his companions.
35. Tatiana She was a highly intelligent Russian spy, the most trusted in his country who can visit any restricted area. She is killed by Sonia in volume 22 of the series in her home.
36. Prince Dagger A man from the Super Master team, who got telepathy skills from a transformer machine.
37. John Dagger: A man from the Super Master team, who got telepathy skills from a transformer machine.
38. George Freeman: An intelligent mechanic and scientist who made a transformer machine with help of blueprints and paper details of the original. He was killed by Farhad.
39. Gabriel Grant & Susana: Male and female superhumans who were built by Super Master by scientific technology to bring Madonna from Paris to the U.S.
40. Madonna: She was from the Super Master team who got telepathy skills from transformer machine. She injured Farhad with gunfire which she shot from his companion by means of telepathic control, where he was hiding. She was later killed by Farhad in an airplane crash when Super Master was trying to rescue her from Paris.
41. Master Chimpanzee
42. She-Super: A cruel and intelligent woman who was a big merchant of all kinds of dogs. She was forced to kill Farhad by a Master who was her friend. She was later killed by Sonia.
43. Dharam Vir (The Black Guide): An intelligent officer of Indian intelligence, sent to kill Farhad. He was later killed by Farhad.
44. Stoffer Grace: He was also a member of master group, second of Master Yoshay. He also knows telepathy.
45. Col. Joshoo Hu: The Chief of the Japanese Secret Service
46. Souzuku: The daughter of Col. Joshoo Hu
47. Major Yaamaa Gochi
48. Garlaash
49. Shaheena: Farhad's first cousin. He loved her like a sister.
50. Saeed Ahmed: Farhad's friend and officer of Army Intelligence from Pakistan.
51. Chamia: Indian witch who bewitched Farhad with her black magic and also Sammy Poker, an English girl. She was killed by Farhad.
52. Doctor Makky Brodley / doctor shepherd: A plastic surgeon. He has done many plastic surgeries for Farhad, Sonia and Paras.
53. Black Shadow AKA Christopher Mackey: Farhad's enemy and Boss of 10 Christopher Mackeys.
54. Sarah izzac AKA Laila Saani: She had a double role as Sarah she served as an agent of Israel's secret services and as Laila Saani freedom fighter; the Super Master group killed her.
55. Master Key: A gang of yoga army has many Master keys but originally there are 4 bosses. A division of Super Master Group.
56. Izzat Ali: Chief Flying Officer of Interpol, Farhad's friend
57. Shahnaz: Lady with perfume powers
58. Monkey Master: Leader of monkey force who came from space.
59. Double Jewels: Twin sisters with extraordinary martial arts skills and synchronized brains
60. She Devi: Indian telepath lady working for RAW and later fell in love with Paris (son of Farhad Ali Taimur).
61. Kibriya: Son of Sonia and Farhad Ali Taimoor.
62. Aala Bibi Jr.: Twin sister of Kibriya.
63. SheTara (Shanaz): Dummy of Devi SheTara; wife of Paras Ali Taimoor; telepathic.
64. Jalal Baig: Boss of a gang and enemy of Farhad Ali and Sonia.
65. Tan Sing: Yoga expert and father of Rasvanti.
66. Harper: An Israeli Jew
67. Sharper: Jewish, brother of Harper
68. Barbara: Jewish, sister of Harper and Sharper
