= Sayara Digest =

Pakistani Urdu magazine

- Editor: Muhammad Saqib
- Former editors: Naveedul Islam
- Frequency: Monthly
- Format: Digest
- First issue: February 1, 1963; 63 years ago
- Country: Pakistan
- Language: Urdu

Sayara Digest is an Urdu magazine founded in 1963 and is published from Lahore, Pakistan. It focuses on politics, religion, Science, general info, interviews, features, poetry, fiction, etc. The digest has the tradition of publishing special numbers on different topics like Quran number, Rasool number, Islamic history number, parents number, etc.

== History ==
Sayara Digest was launched in February 1963 from Lahore. Its first managing editor was Naveedul Islam and its editorial circle included Salim Kayani, Abad Shahpuri, Ghulam Hussain Azhar, Nihal Lahori and Aziz Ahmed.
