= Enayat Ullah =

Pakistani playback singer (born 1992)

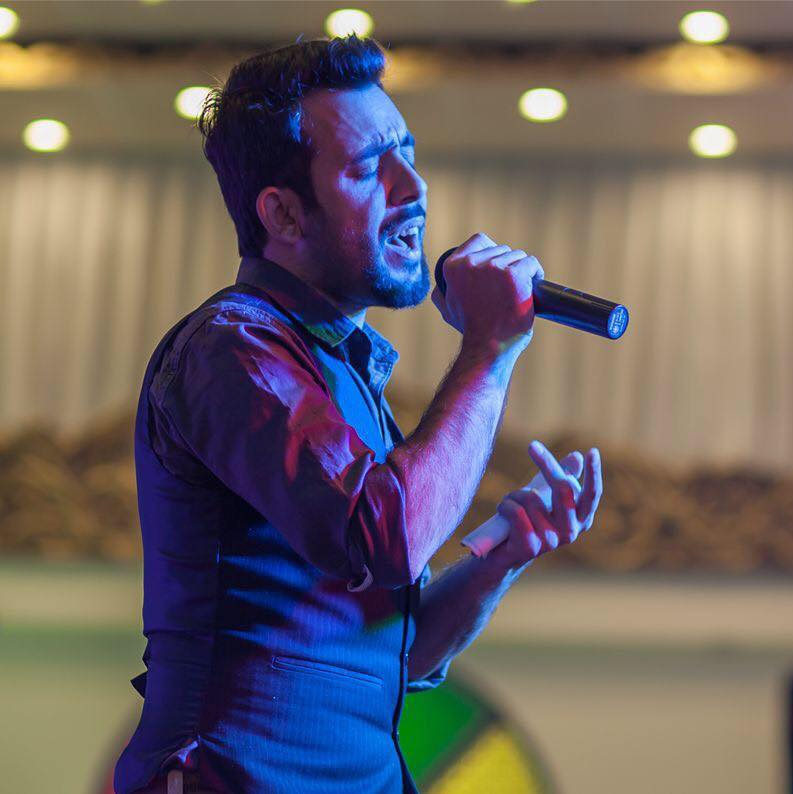
- Ullah with Yoon band

Background information
- Born: 1 May 1992 (age 34); Swat, Khyber Pakhtunkhwa, Pakistan
- Genres: Filmi; Semi classical; Folk music
- Occupations: singer; songwriter; music composer; entrepreneur
- Instruments: Vocals; Rubab
- Years active: 2012–present
- Website: iamenayatyoon.com

Enayat Ullah (born Inayat Ullah; 1 May 1992) known as a popular icon in Pushto music Industry by his unique voice and music compositions. Mr. Enayat Ullah is playback vocalist, music composer and songwriter. Enayat Ullah has been active in music field since 2003. His debut music album was released in 2003 known as; Rangoona Da watan means (Colors of the homeland). Enayat Ullah has been remarkable since childhood in classical, Folk and Semi Classical music along with Rock, Hip Hop and Pop music of Pushtoon land, KPK of the Northern Pakistan. He won presidential gold medal in Boy scouting from the former President of Pakistan Asif Ali Zardari on 20 February 2012. He along with Yoon band recently gained national appreciation for his own written ghazal known as Dar Pa Dar Garzama Za in Pushto and other one of famous Pushtoon Musician Ustad Awalmir Cover in the same show. That master piece was also a big hit known as Ta kho waya za ba sa kram? written by famous poet Khatir.

He is lead vocalist of Yoon Band, founded by Enayat Ullah, Hamza Khan, Sajawal Khan and Sannan Mahboob on 18 August 2016. Yoon Band gave its first performance in the United Nations' UNIC inauguration ceremony at COMSATS University, Islamabad. A big celebration happened in Swat on 31 December's 2016 night when Yoon Band along with Enayat Ullah gave their best concert in the area which gained them provincial fame in less than 1 month covered by national and international media. The concert was a huge success after the war on terror since 2007. Enayat Ullah's talent has been showcased in the previous couple of months since September 2016 on Voice of America radio and TV channels. as well as Mashal Radio live from Prague, Czech Republic.

== Early life ==
Enayat Ullah was born as Khandaan in Swat, Khyber Pakhtunkhwa, on 1 May 1992. His father, Khurshid Ali Khan was a government servant at a primary school in remote village Khwaza Khela Swat. Enayat's father died when he was 4 on 9 September 1996 due to liver cancer. In 2002 Khpal Kor Foundation accepted him for primary and secondary education on orphan's quota. From 28 February 2002 till December 2009 Enayat Ullah completed his Matric education and then went to study Intermediate Government Degree College at Mingora Swat around 2010. He received Gold in Boy Scouting from the ex. President of Pakistan General Pervaiz Musharraf.
