= Trade Chronicle =

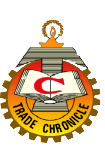

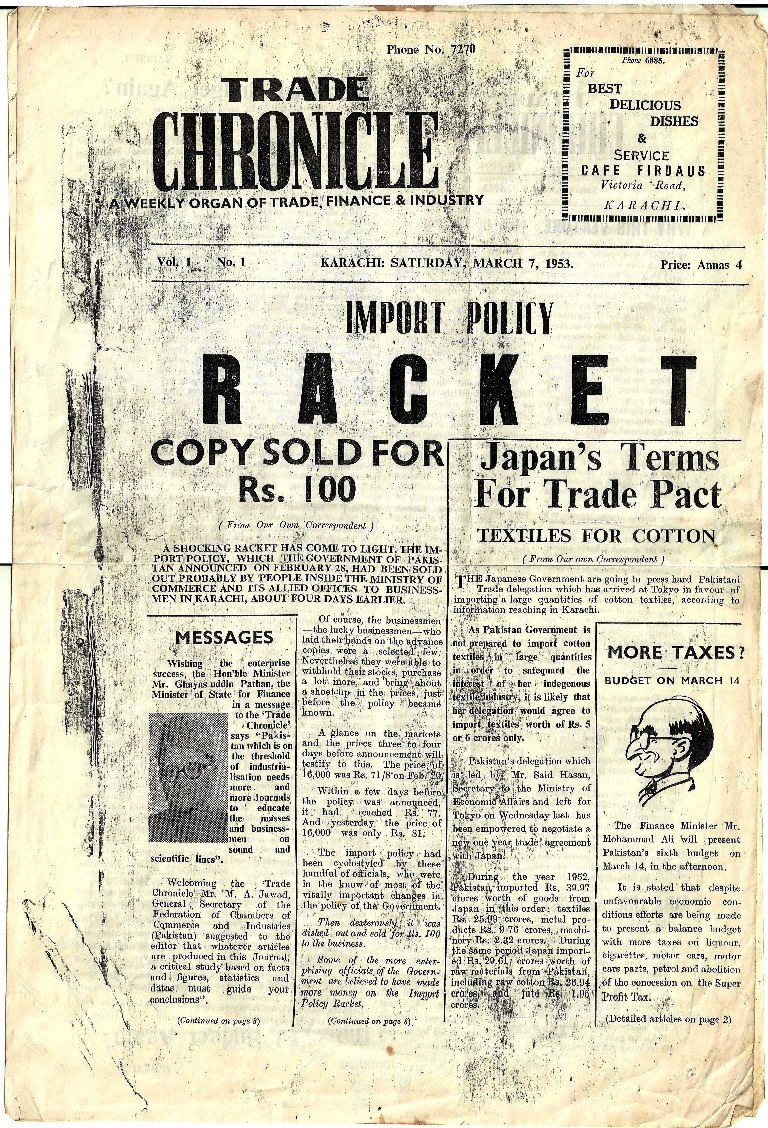
- First copy of Trade Chronicle printed in March 1953
- Editor: Abdul Rab Siddiqi
- Former editors: Mr. Abdul Rauf Siddiqi
- Categories: Commerce, Trade and Industry
- Frequency: Monthly
- Founded: March 23, 1953; 73 years ago
- First issue: March 1953
- Language: English
- Website: Trade Chronicle Website

The Trade Chronicle is a monthly magazine published in Pakistan. It covers topics in trade, commerce, and industry. Regular features include aviation, banking, and insurance news. It has been publishing since 1953.

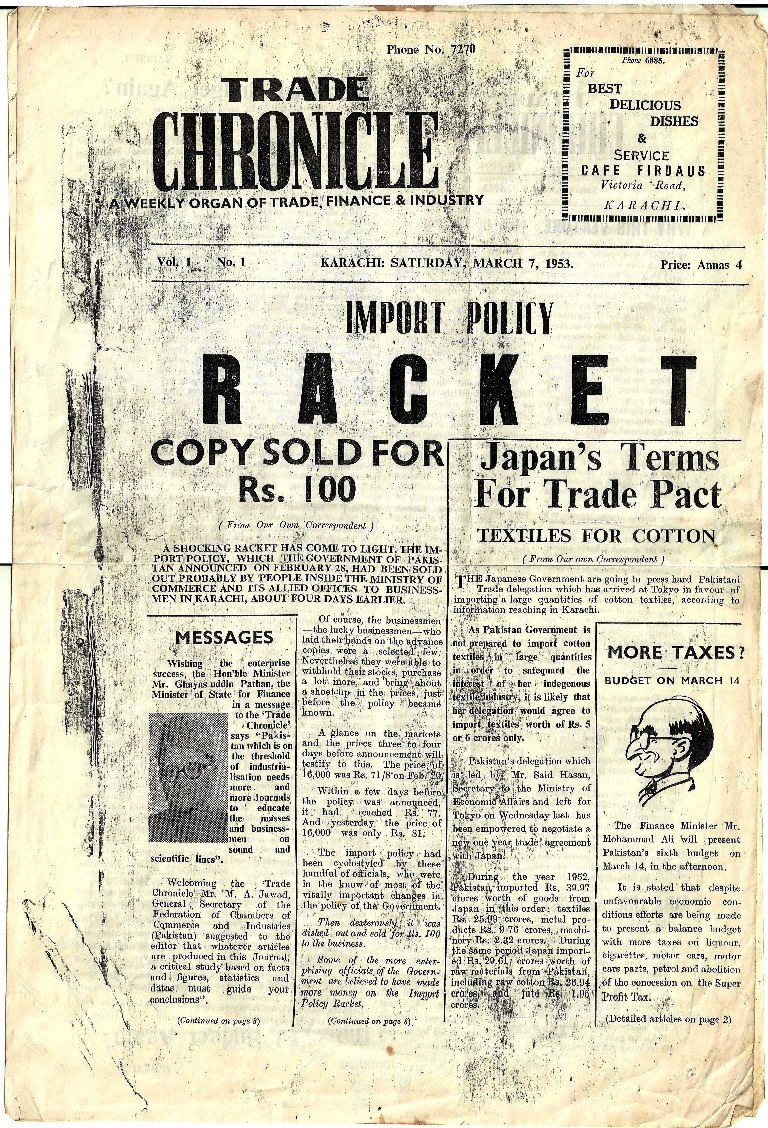
This is the first copy of Trade Chronicle Magazine which was printed by Late Abdul Rauf Siddiqi in 1953
