= The Cricketer (Pakistani magazine) =

Cricket magazine published in Karachi, Pakistan (1972–2008)

The Cricketer was a monthly English-language cricket magazine published in Karachi, Pakistan. It was founded in 1972 by Riaz Ahmed Mansuri. The first issue was published in April 1972. The magazine was initially edited by the noted, then-retired Pakistani cricketer Hanif Mohammad, and later by the statistician and cricket historian Gul Hameed Bhatti.

The magazine closed in April 2008 after 36 years of publication. An Urdu version of The Cricketer Pakistan was also launched in March 1979 and shut down in June 2018.
