= Suspense Digest =

Pakistani Magazine

- Editor-in-chief: Azra Rasool
- Categories: Suspense
- Frequency: Monthly
- Publisher: Jasoosi Digest Publications
- Founder: Mehraj Rasool
- Founded: 1971
- First issue: January 1972
- Country: Pakistan
- Based in: Karachi, Pakistan
- Language: Urdu

Suspense Digest is the largest circulated monthly Urdu language suspense magazine in Pakistan. The approximately 290 to 320 pages magazine is published by JDP (Jasoosi Digest Publications). The first issue was launched in January 1972. The publication has been a member of the All Pakistan Newspapers Society since 24 August 1986.

== Overview ==
The Jasoosi digest publications released various other digests like Jasoosi, Pakeeza, Sarguzasht and Dilkash. These family Urdu magazines are very famous in Pakistan. Suspense Digest is based on social, romantic, history related stories. The magazine is monthly and released by the Jasoosi digest publications on particular dates of a month. Famous story writers of subcontinent like Mohiuddin Nawab, Ilyas Sitapuri, Zia Tasneem Bilgrami, M.A. Rahat and others are associated with these magazines.

The magazine published the world longest fiction novel, Devta, from 1977 to 2010, written by Mohiuddin Nawab.

The most notable serialised novels Suspense Digest has published include:

Suspense Digest Novels
Novel	Writer	Publishing Year
Devta	Mohiuddin Nawab	February 1977–January 2010
Moout Ke Sodagar	Aqleem Aleem	October 1984–June 2006
Anari	Ahmed Iqbal	May 2006–February 2012
Firoon	Sheen Sagheer Adeeb	1979–1980
Taloot	MA Rahat	1973–1977
Nirwan ki Talash	MA Rahat	1974–1980
Darkshan	Anwar Siddique	1982–1984
Musafir	Nasir Malik	2012–2014
Janaum Kada	Hafeez Iqbal	1981–1984
Kashkol	Anwar Siddiqe	2011–2013
Sheesh Mahel	Asma Qadri	2015–2017
Marvi	Mohiuddin Nawab	2014–2016
Waqat	Hussam butt	2017–2019
