= Zia Inayat Khan =

President of the Inayatiyya

Pir Zia Inayat Khan
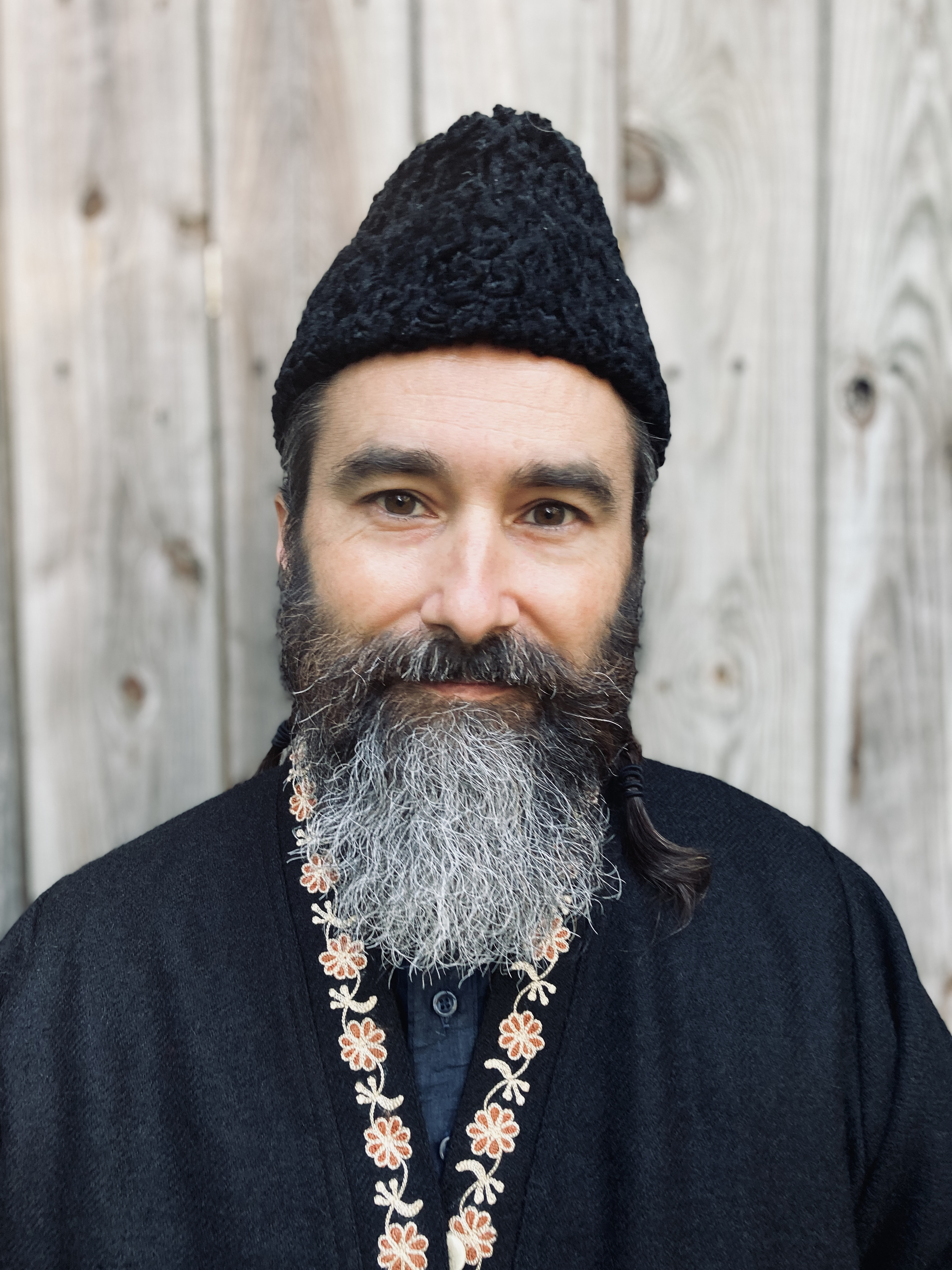
- Title: Pir-o-Murshid

Personal life
- Born: 1971 (age 54–55) Novato, California
- Known for: Sufi teaching, scholarship, writing
- Relatives: Inayat Khan, Pir Vilayat Inayat Khan, Noor Inayat Khan

Religious life
- Religion: Islam
- Order: Inayati Sufism
- Creed: Sufism
- Profession: Teacher, Author

Muslim leader
- Predecessor: Pir Vilayat
- Website: https://pirzia.org/

Zia Inayat Khan (born 1971) is a scholar and teacher of Sufism in the lineage of his grandfather, Hazrat Inayat Khan. He is president of the Inayatiyya (formerly Inayati Order) and founder of Suluk Academy, a school of contemplative study with branches in the United States and Europe.

== Biography ==
Zia Inayat Khan was born in Novato, California, in 1971, and is the first son of Sufi teachers Vilayat Inayat Khan and Murshida Taj Inayat. Vilayat made it clear to Zia at an early age that he wished him to take the mantle of his Sufi lineage as passed down from Inayat Khan, and instructed him in meditation and spiritual retreat. He earned his Ph.D. in Religion from Duke University and a B.A. (Hons.) in Persian Literature from the London School of Oriental and African Studies. Zia was confirmed as spiritual successor to Vilayat in 2001, and has served as head of the Inayatiyya, guiding Inayati communities in North and South America, Europe, the Middle East, Asia, and the South Pacific.

== Works ==
Zia has lectured and taught extensively throughout the United States, Europe, and India on Sufism and its relevance to personal and collective transformation. Zia has specialized in carrying forward and teaching the spiritual legacy of his grandfather, Inayat Khan. Zia's writings and talks also focus on connecting the heritage of contemplative wisdom traditions with contemporary society, with an emphasis on responding to crucial ecological and social challenges. He regards the current ecological crisis as “a unique and compelling factor in contemporary mysticism,” and that the spiritual answer to the ecological crisis lies in the acknowledgment of the sacredness of nature and of the environment.

== Publications ==
- Inayat Khan, Zia (2000). "7 Illuminative Presence". In Hart, Tobin; Nelson, Peter L.; Puhakka, Kaisa (eds.). Transpersonal Knowing: Exploring the Horizon of Consciousness. SUNY Press. pp. 147–159. ISBN 978-0791446164.
- Inayat Khan, Zia, ed. (2001). Pearl in Wine: Essays on the Life, Music and Sufism of Hazrat Inayat Khan. Omega Publications. ISBN 978-0-930872-70-0.
- Inayat Khan, Zia (2006). A hybrid Sufi order at the crossroads of modernity: the Sufi order and Sufi movement of Pir-o-Murshid Inayat Khan.
- Inayat Khan, Pir Zia (2012). Saracen Chivalry: Counsels on Valor, Generosity and the Mystical Quest. Suluk Press. ISBN 978-0-930872-91-5.
- Inayat Khan, Pir Zia (2013). Caravan of Souls: An Introduction to the Sufi Path of Hazrat Inayat Khan. Suluk Press. ISBN 978-1-941810-02-6.
- Inayat Khan, Pir Zia (2013). "Persian and Indian Visions of the Living Earth". In Vaughan-Lee, Llewellyn (ed.). Spiritual Ecology: The Cry of the Earth. Golden Sufi Center. ISBN 978-1890350451.
- Inayat Khan, Pir Zia (2014). "The Seed of Love". In Global Peace Initiative of Women (ed.). Sacred Seed, A Collection of Essays. Golden Sufi Center. ISBN 978-1-890350-63-5.
- Inayat Khan, Pir Zia (2015). Seven Pillars: Journey to Wisdom. Seven Pillars House of Wisdom. ISBN 978-0692327074.
- Inayat Khan, Pir Zia (2016). Ritterliche Tugenden im Alten Orient: Edelmut, Tapferkeit und mystische Suche (in German). Verlag Heilbronn. ISBN 978-3-936246-25-4.
- Inayat Khan, Pir Zia (2017). Bird Language: Aphorisms in 7 Languages. Verlag Heilbronn. ISBN 978-3-936246-28-5.
- Inayat Khan, Pir Zia (2017). Mingled Waters: Sufism and the Mystical Unity of Religions. Suluk Press. ISBN 978-1-941810-20-0.
- Inayat Khan, Pir Zia (2020). Dream Flowers: The Collected Works of Noor Inayat Khan. Suluk Press. ISBN 978-1941810347.
- Inayat Khan, Pir Zia (2021). Ritterschaft des Herzens: 40 Regeln für ein aufrechtes Leben (in German). Verlag Heilbronn. ISBN 978-3-936246-46-9.
- Inayat Khan, Pir Zia (2022). Immortality: A Traveler’s Guide. Suluk Press. ISBN 978-1941810422.
- Inayat Khan, Pir Zia (2023). "Learning to Master Anger". In Daaji (Kamlesh Patel) (ed.). From Anger to Love: A Collaboration Spanning the Fields of Science, Psychology and Contemplative Traditions. Westland. ISBN 978-9360454678.
- Inayat Khan, Pir Zia (2023). Heilige Ströme: Die mystische Einheit der Religionen und der Sufismus (in German). Verlag Heilbronn. ISBN 978-3-936246-53-7.
- Inayat Khan, Pir Zia (2024). Soufisme et unité mystique des religions: Au confluent des eaux (in French). Éditions L'Harmattan. ISBN 978-2-336-45566-2.
- Inayat Khan, Pir Zia (2026). Tears from the Mother of the Sun: A Secret History of the World. Inner Traditions. ISBN 979-8888501825.
