= Inayatullah (editor) =

Pakistani novelist

- عنایت اللہ
- Born: Inayatullah; 1 November 1920; Gujar Khan, Punjab, British India
- Died: 16 November 1999 (aged 79)
- Occupation: Novelist / editor
- Years active: 1970–1999

Inayatullah (1920–1999) was a Pakistani novelist, story writer, and the founding editor of monthly Hikayat Digest.

== Early life ==
Inayatullah was born into a Rajput family on 1 November 1920, in Gujar Khan, Punjab, British India. In 1936, he passed his matriculation examination and joined the British Army as a clerk. He was in an infantry unit of the British army and fought at Burma Front against Japan. In 1944, Inayatullah was taken prisoner by the Japanese, but managed to flee from the prison, again joining the British army. His unit was sent by the authorities to Malaysia to counter the rebellions. After the partition of British India, Inayatullah joined the Pakistan Air Force as a corporal. In 1965, when the war started between Pakistan and India, he became a war correspondent.

== Writing career ==
Inayatullah started his career as an editor of the monthly Sayyara digest. He later founded his own publishing house, Maktabae Daastan. In 1970, Inayatullah began publishing a monthly magazine called Hikayat Digest from Lahore. Inayatullah was drawn to writing historical books during the time. He also wrote historical novels, hunting stories, and detective fiction in addition to his editorial job. He also wrote about general psychology, biography, politics, and social evils in his essays. He published over a hundred works under the pen names Meem Alf, Iltumsh, Ahmad Yar Khan, Sabir Hussain Rajput, Waqas, Mehdi Khan, and Gumnaam Khatoon, along with his original name Inayatullah.

== Books ==
=== Historical novels ===
- Andalus ki Nagin
- Aur Neel Behta Raha: 2 volumes
- Firdaus-e-Iblees: 2 volumes
- Dastaan Eemaan Faroshon Ki: 5 volumes
- Damishq Ke Qaid Khanay Main
- Doob Doob Kar Ubhri Nao
- Hijaaz ki Aandhi
- Aur Aik Boot Shikan Paida Huwa: 4 volumes
- Shamsheer-e-Bay Niyaam: 2 volumes
- Sitaara Jo Toot Gaya
- Ameer Taimoor
- Azaadi ya Jung ke Hero

=== Other novels ===
- 2 Pullon Ki Kahani
- 4 Dewari Ke Dareechon Say
- Aik Kahaani
- Main Gunahgar To Nahin
- Khaki Wardi Lal Lahoo
- BRB Behti Rahay Gi
- Akhiyan Meet Ke Sapna Takya
- Fateh Garh Se Farar
- Badar Say Batapur Tak
- 4 Deewari Ki Dunya
- Choti Behan Ka Pagla Bhai
- Hamari Shikast Ki Kahani
- Hamzad ka Ishq
- Parcham Urhta Raha
- Jurm Jang Or Jazbaat
- Heeray Ka jigger
- Kala Burqa Jal RahaTha
- Lahore Ki Dehleez Per
- Main Buzdil Tha Aur Wo Mar Gaya hay Tum Zinda Raho
- Main Kisi Ki Beti Nahi
- Manzil Aur Musafir
- Pakistan Aik Payaz Aur Do Rotian
- Panchveen Larki
- Raat ka Rahi
- Patan Patan Kay Paapi
- Payasi Roohen
- Piyasay
- Tahira
- Uljhay Rastay
- Ustani Aur Taxi Driver
- Wajida Veena Aur Watan

== Death ==
Inayatullah died on 16 November 1999, in Lahore at the age of 79.
