= Herald (Pakistan) =

Monthly magazine in Pakistan

- Cover of the May 2016 Herald
- Editor: Muhammad Badar Alam
- Former editors: Razia Bhatti
- Categories: Politics and current affairs
- Frequency: Monthly
- Circulation: ~ 1,000–9,999
- Founded: 1948 as Illustrated Weekly of Pakistan
- First issue: January 1970
- Final issue: 14 July 2019
- Company: Dawn Media Group
- Country: Pakistan
- Based in: Karachi
- Language: English
- Website: herald.dawn.com
- OCLC: 1589238

The Herald was a politics and current affairs monthly magazine published by the Dawn Media Group in Karachi, Pakistan, from 1970 to 2019. The Herald was responsible for producing many large and breaking stories since its inception.

It was renamed from The Illustrated Weekly of Pakistan in January 1970, which was published from 1948–1969.

It was Pakistan's most widely read monthly magazine, providing in-depth analyses, investigative reporting and extensive coverage of current affairs. The magazine enjoyed a wide circulation abroad, particularly among academics and Pakistani expatriate communities in the Middle East, United Kingdom and North America.

The "indomitable Razia Bhatti" was the magazine's first editor.

During General Zia's military dictatorship's tough press censorship, the magazine "maintained its independence with an unusual weapon — the blank space."

It stopped publication after its July 2019 issue, 20 issues short of 600, after nearly 50 years of publication.

== See also ==
- List of magazines in Pakistan
