= Inayat Ollah Khan Niazi =

Inayat Ollah Khan Niazi (born August 14, 1940) is a retired officer of the Pakistan Army and a bureaucrat. A recipient of Sitara-i-Imtiaz, he served in the Pakistan Army from 1958 to 1997.

On his retirement in 1997, he was appointed Director General Federal of the Investigation Authority (DG FIA) from which he resigned a few months later. In 1998, he was appointed Chairman of the Benevolent Fund. After the military coup of General Musharraf, he was offered the prestigious post of Deputy Chairman of the National Accountability Bureau (NAB). Over the years he has held other posts such as DG Auqaf and Chairman NAFDEC. He held the status of a Federal Minister in his last assignment as Chairman Federal Land Commission. He retired from public service on August 16, 2008.
