= Victoria & Abdul: The True Story of the Queen's Closest Confidant =

2010 book by Shrabani Basu

- Author: Shrabani Basu
- Language: English
- Subject: History
- Published: 2010
- Publisher: The History Press
- Publication date: 1st 2010, 2nd 2011, 3rd 2017
- Publication place: United Kingdom
- Pages: 334
- ISBN: 978-0-7509-8258-0

Victoria & Abdul: The True Story of the Queen's Closest Confidant is a book about Queen Victoria and her Munshi Abdul Karim, researched and written by Shrabani Basu, published by The History Press in 2010, and adapted to produce the feature film Victoria & Abdul in 2017.

== Synopsis ==
In the introduction, Basu explains how a visit to the restored Durbar room at Osborne House in 2001, in her research of the Queen's taste for curry, drew her attention to a painting of Karim on the wall of the Indian corridor, and how "he looked more like a nawab than a servant".

The historical context of when and where Karim was born is followed by an account of the Colonial and Indian Exhibition of 1886 and how he was subsequently recruited by the superintendent of Agra Central Jail, John W. Tyler, to wait on the Queen in England during her Golden Jubilee. The display of Indian maharajahs is detailed before the story of how Karim came to be in Queen Victoria's regular presence, giving her daily lessons in Urdu.

In addition to Queen Victoria and Karim, the main personages featuring in the book include some members of the Royal family, the Royal Household, viceroys and secretaries of state for India, British prime ministers and several Indians.

Sources in the book include the Royal collections at St James's Palace, Royal Archives at Windsor Castle, Osborne House, material from the British Library, the diaries and scrapbooks of Sir James Reid, the unpublished personal memoirs of Abdul Karim, kept in Karachi, India office records, journals written by Queen Victoria in Urdu, and several newspapers. Secondary sources include Michaela Reid's Ask Sir James (1987).

== Bibliographic details ==
Victoria & Abdul was first published in 2010, then in 2011 and 2017, by The History Press, based in Gloucester. The book has 334 pages, beginning with a contents page, author's note, acknowledgements, a forward, a diagram of Queen Victoria's family tree, a mid-19th century map of British India territories, a map of the United Kingdom showing the locations of the Queen's palaces, and a dramatis personae, followed by an introduction, 15 chapters, an epilogue, notes and sources, a bibliography and an index. Between pages 224 and 225 are 16 pages of photographs.

== Personages discussed ==
In addition to Queen Victoria and Karim, the main characters featuring in the book include some members of the Royal family, the Royal Household, viceroys and secretaries of state for India, British prime ministers and several Indians.

=== Royal Family ===
- Prince Edward
- Princess Alix
- Princess Victoria, German Empress
- Princess Alice
- Princess Helena of Schleswig-Holstein
- Prince Arthur, Duke of Connaught
- Princess Beatrice
- Prince Henry of Battenberg
- Princess May of Teck
- Prince George

=== The Royal Household ===
- Henry Ponsonby
- James Reid
- Fritz Ponsonby
- Arthur Bigge
- Harriet Phipps
- Lady Edith Lytton
- Fleetwood Edwards
- Dighton Probyn
- Edward Pelham Clinton

=== Prime ministers ===
- Marquess of Salisbury
- William Gladstone
- Earl of Rosebery

=== Indians ===
- Khuda Bakhsh
- Muhammad Bukhsh
- Bhai Ram Singh
- Rafiuddin Ahmed
- Duleep Singh
- Nripendra Narayan
- Suniti Devi
- Sayaji Rao Gaekwad
- Chimnabai
- John W. Tyler

=== Secretary of State for India ===
- Lord Cross
- Lord Kimberley
- Lord Fowler
- Lord Hamilton
- Lord Morley

=== Viceroys ===
- Lord Dufferin
- Lord Lansdowne
- Lord Elgin
- Lord Curzon
- Lord Minto

== Reviews ==
Reviews of the book appeared in The Washington Post, The Washington Times, BBC History Magazine, Dawn, The New York Times, Vanity Fair and the Times of India.

The Washington Times described the author as having "done solid homework". The BBC History Magazine stated that the book told a "charming tale which should have been told before", and in Dawn, the book was described as "a mélange of history, drama and fantasy". The Times of India said that its power lay in it being "fact rather than fiction".

The review in The Washington Post ended with "it's good that the story of the queen and her munshi has been brought to light, but the bright shine of Victoria & Abdul means there's no room for history's more shadowy parts". A review in The New York Times was titled "When the Empress of India Met Her Muslim Teacher". Vanity Fair questioned why their relationship was so controversial. Basu had examined Queen Victoria's Hindustani journals and Karim's personal diaries, unlike previous biographers of the Queen.

== Film adaptation ==
The book was adapted to make the film Victoria & Abdul (2017), which features Dame Judi Dench and Ali Fazal.
