= Sravana =

Sravana, Shravana or Shravan may refer to:

- Shravana (hearing), Sanskrit term for hearing
- Shravana, a Hindu nakshatra as used in Hindu astronomy
- Shravana (month), the fifth month of the Hindu calendar, connected to the arrival of the south-west monsoons
- Shravana Kumara, a character in the ancient Indian epic Ramayana
- Sravana Bhargavi (born 1989), Indian playback singer
- Shravan Reddy, Indian actor

== See also ==
- Saravan (disambiguation)
- Sravanthi (disambiguation)
- Shrawan Kumar (disambiguation)
- Saravanan, an Indian name
  - Saravanan (actor), Indian actor
- Shrabani Basu, Indian journalist and historian
- Shrabani Deodhar, Indian film director and screenwriter
- Srabani Nanda, Indian sprinter
- Srabani Sen, Indian musician
