= Priyanga Burford =

English actress, narrator, and writer

- Occupations: Actress, narrator, and writer
- Spouse: Tom Burford (m. 1999)
- Children: 2

Priyanga Burford is an English actress, narrator, and writer. She is known for her TV work in UKIP: The First 100 Days (2015), Innocent (2017), and Steeltown Murders (2023). She has also performed on stage, including in the premiere production of Consent at the Royal National Theatre in 2017.

== Career ==
=== Film and television ===
Burford's screen acting credits include roles in No Time to Die, A Long Way Down, A Rather English Marriage, The Thick of It, Silent Witness, and Casualty. In 2015, she starred in the Channel 4 mockumentary UKIP: The First 100 Days in which she played the fictional Deepa Kaur, the first Asian woman to be elected as a UK Independence Party Member of Parliament. In 2017, she appeared in King Charles III, a future history television film adapted by Mike Bartlett from his play of the same name. She plays Mrs Stevens, Leader of the Opposition. In 2021, she starred in the second season of the ITV crime drama Innocent. She played Sita Anwar in the 2023 four-part BBC series Steeltown Murders, which dramatises a true crime story of the cold case investigation into a serial killer in Port Talbot, Wales, in the 1970s.

=== Theatre ===
Between 28 April and 17 May 2017, she appeared in the premiere production of Consent at the in the Dorfman Theatre, National Theatre, London.

Between 21 September and 24 October 2026, she appeared as the character Noor in play A Small and Quiet Light, an original play written by Stephanie Street, based on the book Spy Princess: The Life of Noor Inayat Khan by Shrabani Basu, and directed by Elin Schofield, at the Orange Tree Theatre in Richmond, London.

=== Videogames ===
In 2026, she made her videogame performance debut as M in 007 First Light.
