= Victoria & Abdul =

2017 British biographical historical drama film by Stephen Frears

- British release poster
- Directed by: Stephen Frears
- Screenplay by: Lee Hall
- Based on: Victoria & Abdul by Shrabani Basu
- Produced by: Tim Bevan; Eric Fellner; Beeban Kidron; Tracey Seaward
- Starring: Ali Fazal; Judi Dench; Eddie Izzard; Adeel Akhtar; Paul Higgins; Michael Gambon
- Cinematography: Danny Cohen
- Edited by: Melanie Oliver
- Music by: Thomas Newman
- Production companies: Focus Features; BBC Films; Perfect World Pictures; Working Title Films; Cross Street Films
- Distributed by: Focus Features (United States); Universal Pictures (International)
- Release dates: 3 September 2017 (Venice); 22 September 2017 (United Kingdom); 6 October 2017 (United States)
- Running time: 111 minutes
- Countries: United Kingdom; United States
- Languages: English; Urdu; Hindi
- Budget: $21 million
- Box office: $68.3 million

Victoria & Abdul is a 2017 biographical historical drama film directed by Stephen Frears and written by Lee Hall. The film is based on the book Victoria & Abdul: The True Story of the Queen's Closest Confidant by Shrabani Basu, about the real-life relationship between Queen Victoria of the United Kingdom and her Indian Muslim servant Abdul Karim. It stars Judi Dench, Ali Fazal, Michael Gambon, Eddie Izzard, Tim Pigott-Smith (in his final film role), and Adeel Akhtar. The film had its world premiere at the 74th Venice Film Festival and was theatrically released on 15 September 2017 in the United Kingdom. It grossed $68 million worldwide.

The film was nominated for Best Costume Design and Best Makeup and Hairstyling at the 90th Academy Awards, and Best Actress in a Motion Picture – Musical or Comedy (for Dench) at the 75th Golden Globe Awards.

== Plot ==
Abdul Karim, a young prison clerk from a Muslim, Urdu-speaking family in Agra, British India, is instructed to travel to Britain for Queen Victoria's Golden Jubilee in 1888 to present her with a mohur, a gold coin that has been minted as a token of appreciation from British-ruled India.

The Queen, lonely and tired of her fawning courtiers, develops an interest in and then a friendship with Abdul. She spends time with him alone and gives him a bejewelled locket with her photograph. She promotes him to be her Munshi and asks him to teach her Urdu and the Quran. She in fact learns Urdu for 14 years. When Victoria discovers he is married, she has him bring his wife to England. His wife and his mother-in-law both wear black burqas, much to the consternation of the household—and the fascination of Victoria.

As Victoria's interest in India grows, she has the Durbar Room built at her Isle of Wight home of Osborne House for state functions. It is elaborately and intricately decorated, with a carpet from Agra, formal portraits of renowned Indians, a replica of the Peacock Throne and carvings by Bhai Ram Singh.

While Victoria treats Abdul as a son, his preferment is resented by her household and inner circle, including her son, Bertie, and the prime minister, Lord Salisbury. The household plots to undermine their relationship, hoping that Abdul will be sent home. When Victoria embarrasses herself by recounting Abdul's one-sided account of the Indian Rebellion of 1857 to the court, Victoria's faith and trust in him are shaken. She decides he must return to India, but soon changes her mind and asks him to stay.

The prime minister is adamant that the royal household must be rid of Abdul. They research his family background in India and present Victoria with a dossier showing that his family is more ordinary and poor than Abdul claimed. When Victoria insists that her doctor examine Abdul to learn why his wife has not become pregnant, he discovers that Abdul has gonorrhea. He expects the Queen will dismiss Abdul in disgust, but Victoria remains loyal to him, orders his medical treatment and admonishes her courtiers for plotting against him. She announces her intention to give Abdul a knighthood.

Eventually, the household decides that Victoria must break with Abdul. If not, they all will resign and have Victoria declared insane. When Victoria is told, she angrily summons her family and the entire household and demands that anyone who wishes to give up their place should step forward. When no-one does, she says she has decided against making Abdul a knight. She will instead include him in her next honours list as a Commander of the Royal Victorian Order.

When Victoria falls ill, she urges Abdul to return to India while she can still protect him and warns him that the court will turn on him after her death. Abdul insists that he will stay until her death. In 1901, Victoria dies, and Bertie, now King Edward VII, rejects Abdul, burning all the gifts and papers from the Queen, and sending him and his family back to India. Abdul's wife saves the locket Victoria gave him.

It is revealed that Abdul lived in India until his death eight years later in 1909. The film ends with Abdul bowing out to a large statue of Queen Victoria close to the Taj Mahal, and talking to it in respect.

== Cast ==
The cast includes:

- Judi Dench as Queen Victoria
- Ali Fazal as Abdul Karim
- Tim Pigott-Smith as Henry Ponsonby
- Eddie Izzard as Albert Edward, Prince of Wales, later Edward VII ("Bertie")
- Adeel Akhtar as Mohammad Bakhsh
- Michael Gambon as Robert Gascoyne-Cecil, 3rd Marquess of Salisbury
- Paul Higgins as Sir James Reid, 1st Baronet
- Olivia Williams as Jane Spencer, Baroness Churchill
- Fenella Woolgar as Harriet Phipps
- Julian Wadham as Alick Yorke
- Robin Soans as Arthur Bigge, 1st Baron Stamfordham
- Simon Callow as Giacomo Puccini
- Simon Paisley Day as Mr Tyler
- Amani Zardoe as Princess Helena of the United Kingdom
- Sophie Trott as Sophia of Prussia
- Penny Ryder as Sophie of the Netherlands
- Joe Caffrey as Sous Chef
- Tim McMullan as Tailor
- Jonathan Harden as Wilhelm II, German Emperor
- John Rowe as Head Waiter

== Production ==
On 17 June 2016, it was reported that Judi Dench would play Queen Victoria in Victoria & Abdul, a film based on the book of the same name by Shrabani Basu. Stephen Frears was set to direct. Dench had also portrayed Victoria in the 1997 film Mrs Brown, to which this film has been described as an unofficial sequel. On 5 August 2016, it was announced that Ali Fazal would play Victoria's confidant Abdul Karim, while the film would be co-produced by Working Title Films and BBC Films, and co-financed by BBC and Focus Features. Focus also handles US distribution rights, while Universal Pictures International handles all other countries. The script was written by Lee Hall, and the producers are Beeban Kidron, Tracey Seaward, Tim Bevan, and Eric Fellner, while the other cast includes Eddie Izzard, Michael Gambon, Tim Pigott-Smith, and Adeel Akhtar.

Principal photography began on 15 September 2016, at Victoria's former royal residence Osborne House on the Isle of Wight.

Costumes from the production were on display at Osborne House from 24 July until 30 September 2017. To capitalise on the renewed interest in Victoria arising from both the film and the concurrent second series of ITV's Victoria television series, the Isle of Wight Tourist Board has created a 'Victoria's Island Trail' encouraging tourists to visit the key locations on the island that have connections to the Queen.

The production also filmed at Chatham Historic Dockyard, Kent, on HMS Gannet and the quayside adjacent to the ship.

== Release ==
Victoria & Abdul was released for audiences in the United Kingdom on 15 September 2017.

== Reception ==
=== Critical response ===
On review aggregator website Rotten Tomatoes, the film has an approval rating of 66% based on 199 reviews, with an average rating of 6.10/10. The site's critical consensus reads, "Victoria & Abdul reunites Dame Judi Dench with the role of Queen Victoria – which is all this period drama needs to overcome its imbalanced narrative." On Metacritic, the film has a weighted average score of 58 out of 100, based on 34 critics, indicating "mixed or average reviews".

In the Women's Voices for Change, Alexandra MacAaron, who rated the movie eight out of ten, wrote that "Judi Dench's Oscar-worthy second turn as Queen Victoria is a poignant portrait of fading power and human connection." Christopher Orr's response from The Atlantic was positive, and he wrote "Victoria & Abdul is worth seeing for Dench's magisterial performance and for Frears's light but sure directorial touch. Just don't mistake it for actual history."

Writing for NPR, Ella Taylor described the film as a "strange hybrid of a movie [which is] also a gentle love story with no possibility of an upbeat ending", though she praised the script as being "bold". In an article for The Independent, Amrou Al-Kadhi criticised the film's depiction of Abdul for its "offensive two-dimensionality".

In the Daily Express, critic Andy Lea rated the film two out of five, describing Abdul's character as "disappointingly servile" and criticising the plot as "decent material for a knockabout farce", but praising Dench as "predictably brilliant". In his 4-out-of-4-rated review, Rex Reed in the New York Observer wrote: "Judi Dench gives a touching, majestic performance" and, complimenting the script and direction, he said that "every scene is gorgeous to look at, every shot magnificently detailed and richly framed. And the exemplary performances are as good as it gets in movies today."

The film has been criticized by The Independent newspaper for "whitewashing" colonialism in depictions of the British Empire.

=== Accolades ===
Year	Award/Festival	Category	Nominee(s)	Result
2017	26th Heartland Film Festival	Truly Moving Picture Award	Stephen Frears	Won
2017	21st Hollywood Film Awards	Hollywood Film Composer Award	Thomas Newman	Won
2018	7th AACTA International Awards	Best Actress	Judi Dench	Nominated
2018	75th Golden Globe Awards	Best Actress in a Motion Picture – Musical or Comedy	Judi Dench	Nominated
2018	24th Screen Actors Guild Awards	Outstanding Performance by a Female Actor in a Leading Role	Judi Dench	Nominated
2018	38th London Film Critics Circle Awards	British/Irish Actress of the Year	Judi Dench	Nominated
2018	17th AARP Movies for Grownups Awards	Best Actress	Judi Dench	Nominated
2018	22nd Satellite Awards	Best Actress in a Motion Picture	Judi Dench	Nominated
2018	22nd Satellite Awards	Best Adapted Screenplay	Lee Hall	Nominated
2018	22nd Satellite Awards	Best Costume Design	Consolata Boyle	Nominated
2018	15th Irish Film & Television Awards	Best Costume Design	Consolata Boyle	Won
2018	90th Academy Awards	Best Costume Design	Consolata Boyle	Nominated
2018	90th Academy Awards	Best Makeup and Hairstyling	Daniel Phillips and Lou Sheppard	Nominated
2018	71st British Academy Film Awards	Best Makeup and Hair	Daniel Phillips and Lou Sheppard	Nominated

== Soundtrack ==
Victoria & Abdul (Original Motion Picture Soundtrack)

Soundtrack album by Thomas Newman
- Released: September 15, 2017
- Genre: Soundtrack
- Length: 46:21
- Label: Back Lot

Thomas Newman soundtrack chronology
Five Came Back (2017)	Victoria & Abdul (Original Motion Picture Soundtrack) (2017)	Thank You for Your Service (2017)

No.	Title	Length
1.	"Ceremonial Fanfare"	0:17
2.	"Agra Gaol"	1:19
3.	"Civilization!"	1:49
4.	"Victoria Regina"	0:34
5.	"Quenelle with Regency Sauce, Etc."	1:35
6.	"The Queen's Gaze"	0:37
7.	"Jelly"	0:27
8.	"The Wickedness of Children"	1:33
9.	"O'Sullivan's March (Trad.)"	0:26
10.	"Florence"	1:32
11.	"Loch Muick"	1:16
12.	"Glassalt Shiel"	1:09
13.	"The Munshi Returns"	1:23
14.	"Unveiled"	0:50
15.	"Peacock Throne"	0:51
16.	"The Mango Is Off"	1:10
17.	""All the Riches of the Orient""	0:58
18.	"Mutiny Lesson"	1:06
19.	"Knocked for Six"	2:33
20.	"Process Turn Bow Present"	1:22
21.	"The Only Way Is Down"	1:13
22.	"Racialists"	1:03
23.	"A Deputation"	0:28
24.	"The Emperor's Egg"	0:39
25.	"Certified Insane"	1:36
26.	"Sons of the Brave"	0:48
27.	"Resign to My Face"	2:04
28.	"Banquet Hall of Eternity"	2:18
29.	"The Empress of India"	6:10
30.	"Victoria & Abdul"	1:58
31.	"Munshi Mania"	2:11
32.	"Gain the Ocean (End Title)"	2:41
Total length:		46:21
