= For King and Another Country =

2015 book by Shrabani Basu

- First edition
- Author: Shrabani Basu
- Language: English
- Genre: Non-fiction
- Publisher: Bloomsbury Press
- Publication date: 2015

For King and Another Country: Indian Soldiers on the Western Front, 1914–18 is a book about the Indian contributions to the British efforts in the First World War, written by Shrabani Basu and published in 2015.
