= Euston Square =

Location in London

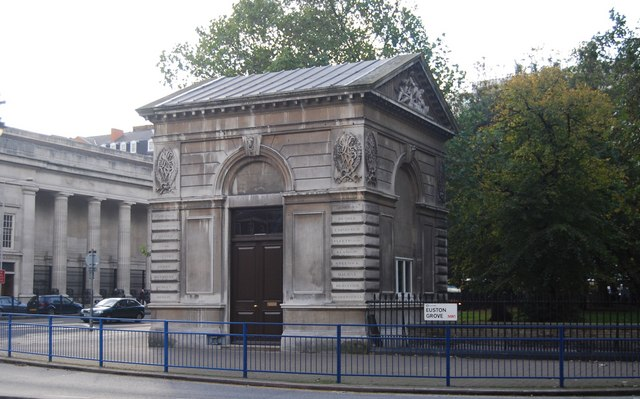
- One of the two lodges in Euston Square Gardens, added in 1870
- Interactive map of Euston Square
- Postal code: NW1
- Coordinates: 51.526895°N 0.132168°W

Construction
- Completion: 1813

Euston Square is a large square in the London Borough of Camden in Central London. It lies on Euston Road, and Euston railway station and Euston bus station are on its northernmost side. Although “Euston Square” strictly refers to the square, in day-to-day use the name is often used to refer to Euston Square tube station, whose entrance is at the junction of Euston Road and North Gower Street. The southern half of the square was built over in the 1920s, leaving Euston Square Gardens on the north side in front of Euston station.

== History ==
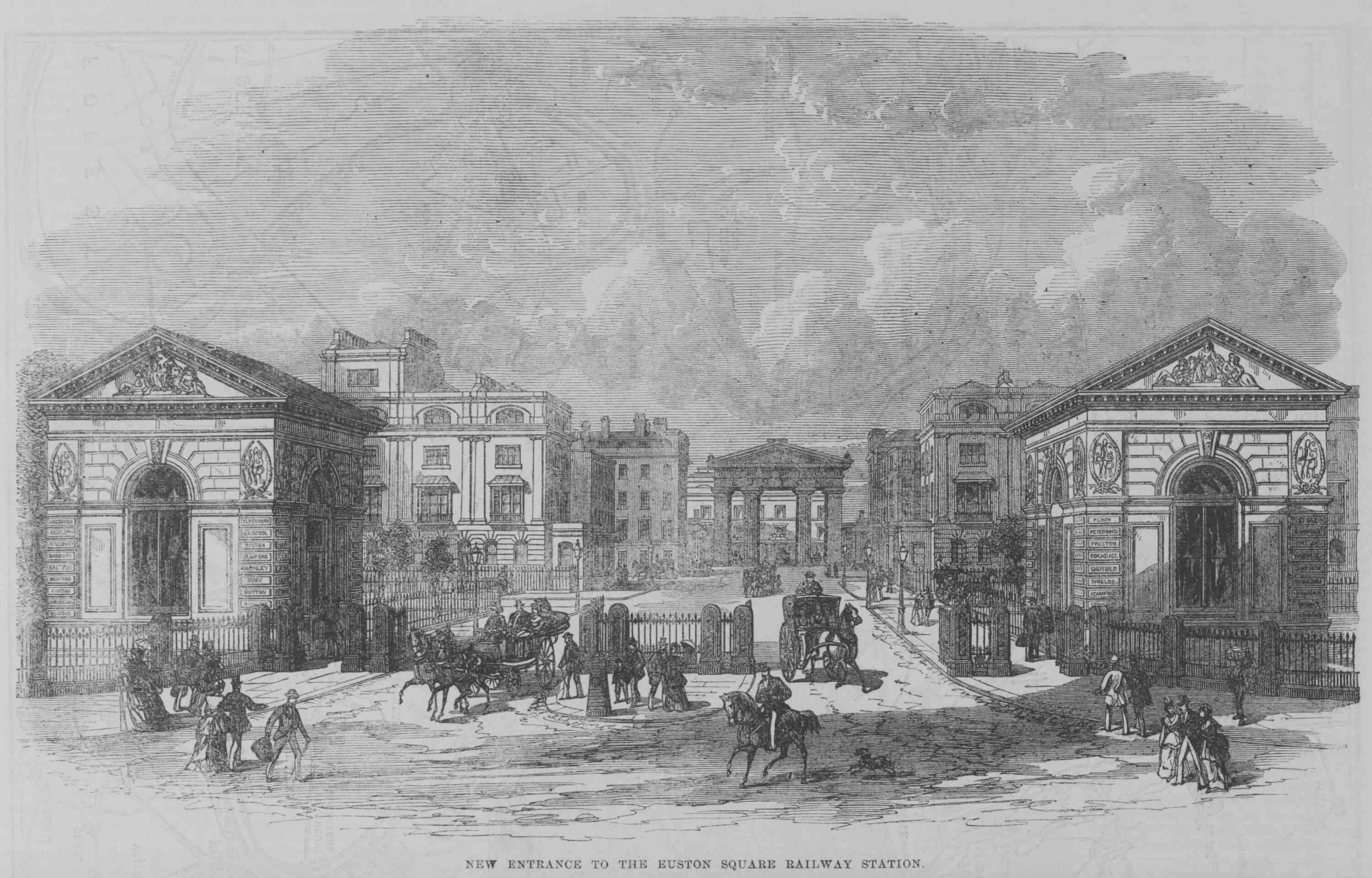
1870 view of the entrance to Euston railway station, known then as Euston Square railway station

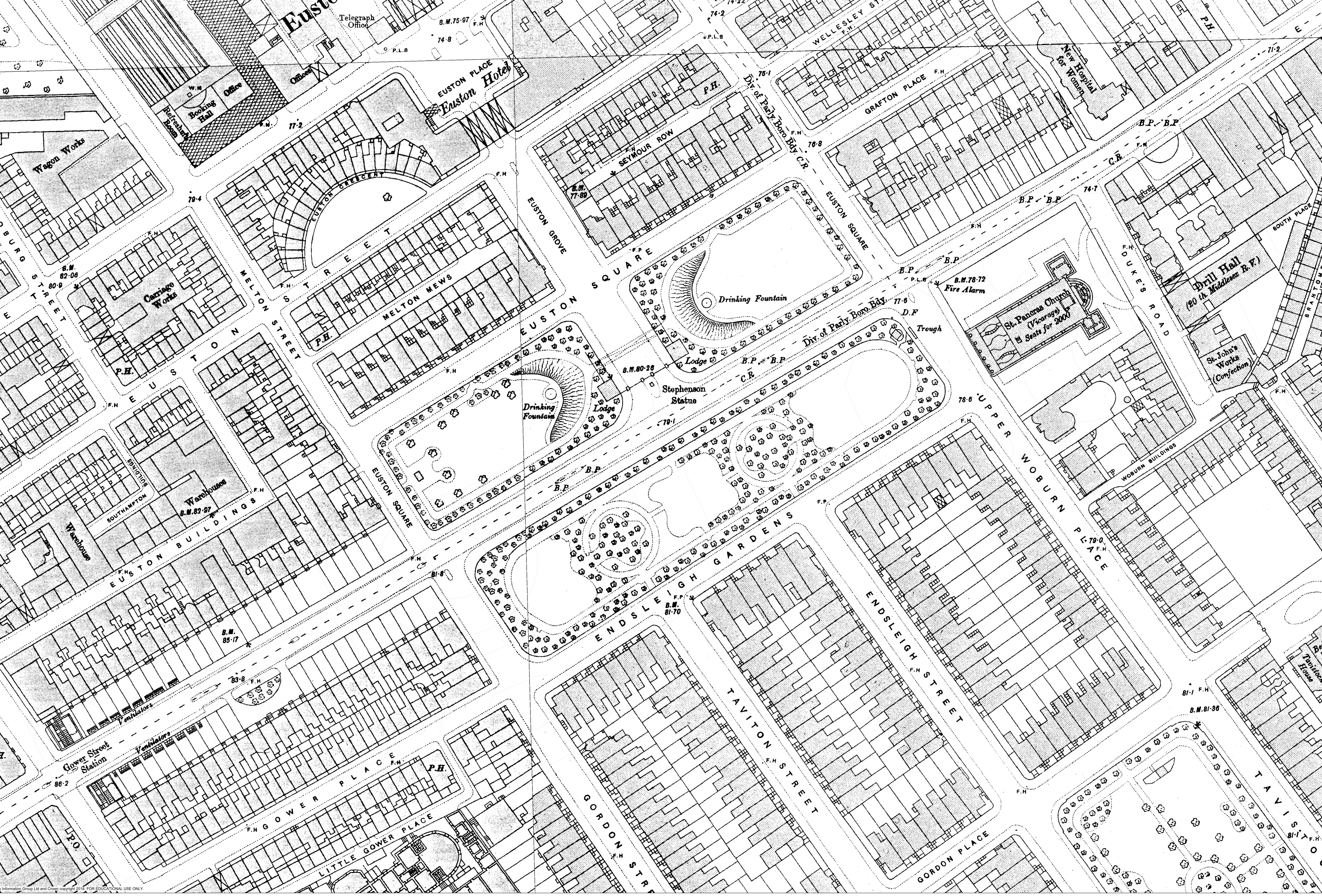
1895 map of Euston Square

Euston Road forms a section of the New Road, which was constructed in the 1750s as a turnpike trust toll road. The road was intended initially as a drovers' road, a route along which to drive cattle and sheep, to the live meat market at Smithfield from roads approaching London from the north and north-west, thus avoiding the congested east–west route via Oxford Street and High Holborn. The road was built to a minimum width of 60 feet (18 m), and very rapidly. It was also intended to halt the “ruinous rage for building” on the north side of central London by the Bedford, Portman and Fitzroy Estates, amongst others.

In the 1810s the northward expansion of Bloomsbury reached the New Road with the creation of Euston Square, named after Euston Hall in Suffolk, the ancestral home of the Dukes of Grafton, the main landowners in the area during the mid-19th century. Gardens were laid out on the north and south sides of the New Road, with houses at its edges.

Euston station became London’s first inter-city railway station when it opened on 20 July 1837 on land adjacent to the north side of Euston Square. The London and Birmingham Railway company was denied the legal right to press further into the city and the line halted at the edge of the Southampton Estate, two blocks north of Euston Square.

Gower Street station was opened in 1863 by the Metropolitan Railway (MR), the world's first underground railway, and was renamed “Euston Square” tube station in 1909.

In 1870 the main line station was rebuilt with a formal layout, and two Portland stone classical style entrance lodges were erected on Euston Road to frame the approach to the portico of the main station entrance, known as the Euston Arch.

In 1877 or 1878, no. 4 Euston Square was the site of a murder that became popularly known as the "Euston Square Murder" after the body of Matilda Hacker was found in the coal cellar of the house in 1879. She had last been seen in 1877.

In 1923 the freehold of the southern part of the square, known as Endsleigh Gardens, came on the market and was bought by the Quakers for building. In return for permission to bring the building line forward by 20 feet (6.1 m), a 30 feet (9.1 m) wide strip of land had to be surrendered for the widening of Euston Road by the London County Council. As a result, half the area of the square was lost.

During World War II, much of the southern side of Euston Road between Gower Street and Gordon Street was destroyed by bombing. In the 1960s, in conjunction with the construction of an underpass at the junction of Euston Road and Tottenham Court Road, Euston Road was widened. The north side of the square was substantially redeveloped, and the old mainline station building was demolished and replaced with the present building.

== Description ==
The north side of the square is occupied by Euston Bus Station, opened in 1979 in front of Euston Station. The London and North Western Railway War Memorial forms the roundabout in front of the bus station.

The residential character of the old Euston Square has largely vanished, and the vicinity is now dominated by the stone facades of commercial and institutional premises, notably the Grade II* listed no. 30 on the west side occupied by the Royal College of General Practitioners, the Grade II listed Friends House on the south side which is home to the central offices of the Religious Society of Friends (the Quakers) in Britain, and on the east side the Grade II* listed Euston Fire Station.

Euston Square Gardens is a pleasant green space where rail travellers and local workers can relax. The two lodges are the only survivors of the formal 1870 layout to Euston Station, along with the statue of the railway engineer Robert Stephenson which originally stood between them and is now located in the station forecourt.

More recently, the west side of the gardens has been repurposed to enable the HS2 construction project. In 2021 the west garden’s London planes were felled so that the station’s taxi rank could be relocated above ground. The rank is due to move to the Eastern Gardens in April 2023 and the Western Gardens will become a work site. London Borough of Camden Council, working with TfL and Network Rail, are agreeing a site restoration scheme with HS2 that will result in an enhanced Euston Square Garden.
