= Sravanthi =

Sravanthi may refer to:

- Sravanthi (film), 1985 Indian Telugu-language romance film
- Sravanthi Juluri (born 1980), Indian visual artist
- Sravanti Mazumdar, Indian singer and radio host
- Sravanthi Naidu, Indian cricketer
- Sravanthi Ravi Kishore (fl. 1986), Indian film producer

== See also ==
- Sravana (disambiguation)
- Srabanti Chatterjee, an Indian actress
- Srabanti Chowdhury, Indian-American electrical engineer
