= Endsleigh Gardens =

Street in Camden, London, England

Coordinates: 51°31′36.7″N 00°07′49.6″W

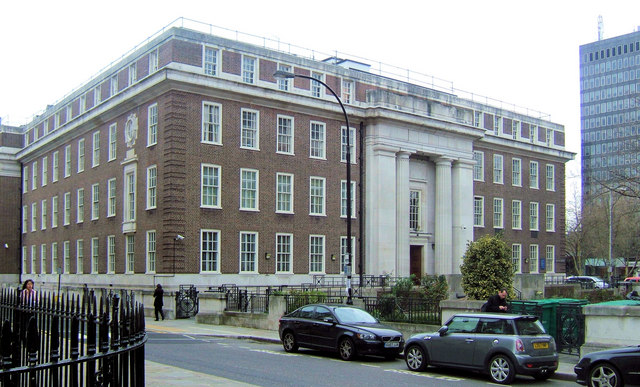
Friends House from Endsleigh Gardens

Endsleigh Gardens is a street in the Bloomsbury district of central London, in the London Borough of Camden. It runs south-west to north-east from Gordon Street to Woburn Place. The south-west end becomes Gower Place after the junction with Gordon Street. Taviton Street and Endsleigh Street run off the south side.

Endsleigh Gardens was formerly the south side of Euston Square, which in 1878 was the site of the "Euston Square Murder". In 1879 the Metropolitan Board of Works renamed the street Endsleigh Gardens in response to local requests.

== Euston Square Murder ==
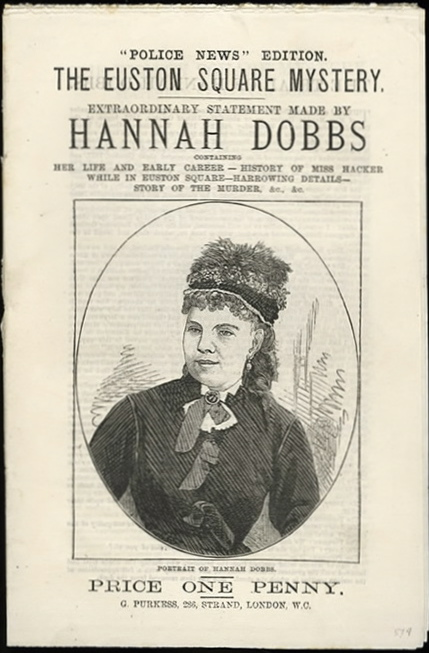
Hannah Dobbs, acquitted of the murder of Matilda Hacker, on the cover of a Police News special edition, c. 1879

Endsleigh Gardens was originally the southern part of Euston Square. In 1877 or 1878, number four Euston Square was the site of a murder that became popularly known as the "Euston Square Murder" after the body of Matilda Hacker was found in the coal cellar of the house in 1879. She had last been seen in 1877.

Hannah Dobbs, a former servant at the house and mistress of the leaseholder Severin Bastendorff, was arrested after it was found that she had pawned some of Hacker's possessions. In 1879 she was tried for murder at the Old Bailey, but acquitted due to lack of evidence.

== Renaming ==
As of 25 September 1879, the Metropolitan Board of Works of London recorded the receipt of a letter from the Vestry of Saint Pancras, asking that the south side of Euston Square be renamed Endsleigh Gardens, and the houses renumbered. The vestry had received the request from George Cubitt, MP, a freeholder of the south side of Euston Square, along with a petition signed by "nearly the whole of the leaseholders and occupiers of the houses there". The vestry meeting had voted in favour, 69 to 3.

As of 28 November 1879, a committee reported to the Metropolitan Board of Works in favour of the request, and as of 5 December 1879, the change was moved, seconded and resolved.

The reasons for the request are not recorded in the Board of Works' minutes. Some accounts suggest that the name was changed to avoid the notoriety of the Euston Square Murder. As early as 1884 The Building News noted, in discussing various name changes, that "A little while before the inhabitants of the north [sic] side of Euston-square tried to bury the murderous memories attached thereto beneath the name of Endsleigh-gardens."

== Buildings ==
Friends House is on the north side of the street between Endsleigh Gardens and the Euston Road.

A 1953 Ordnance Survey map shows on the south side the Endsleigh Hotel on the corner with Gordon Street, a YWCA hostel and the Caledonian Christian Club between Taviton Street and Endsleigh Street, and the Cora Hotel at the east end on the corner with Upper Woburn Place. On the north side is Drayton House on the corner with Gordon Street, Friends House, and a weights and measures office for the London County Council.

== Notable residents ==
Residents of the street have included:

- No 5. William Michael Rossetti, writer and critic, lived there from 1868 to 1891
- No 13. Thomas J. Judkin, reverend and painter; and, James Hamilton, minister and religious author
- No 16. Rev. Henry Stebbing, man of letters and cleric
- No 18. Sir Percy Bunting, journalist

On 10 September 1889, the poet and novelist Amy Levy killed herself at the family home at No 7, aged 27, by carbon monoxide poisoning after suffering from depression. There has been some campaigning for a blue plaque there to remember her. Oscar Wilde described her as "a girl who has a touch of genius in her work".

In the 1890s, there were reports of prostitution in the area. Resident James Stock complained to the Metropolitan Police of "the fearful prevalence… of a gross state of street prostitution attended by features of a very disgusting character, particularly between the hours of 10 and 12 at which it is not fit for any respectable female to walk about and young men cannot do so without molestation."

== Historic maps ==
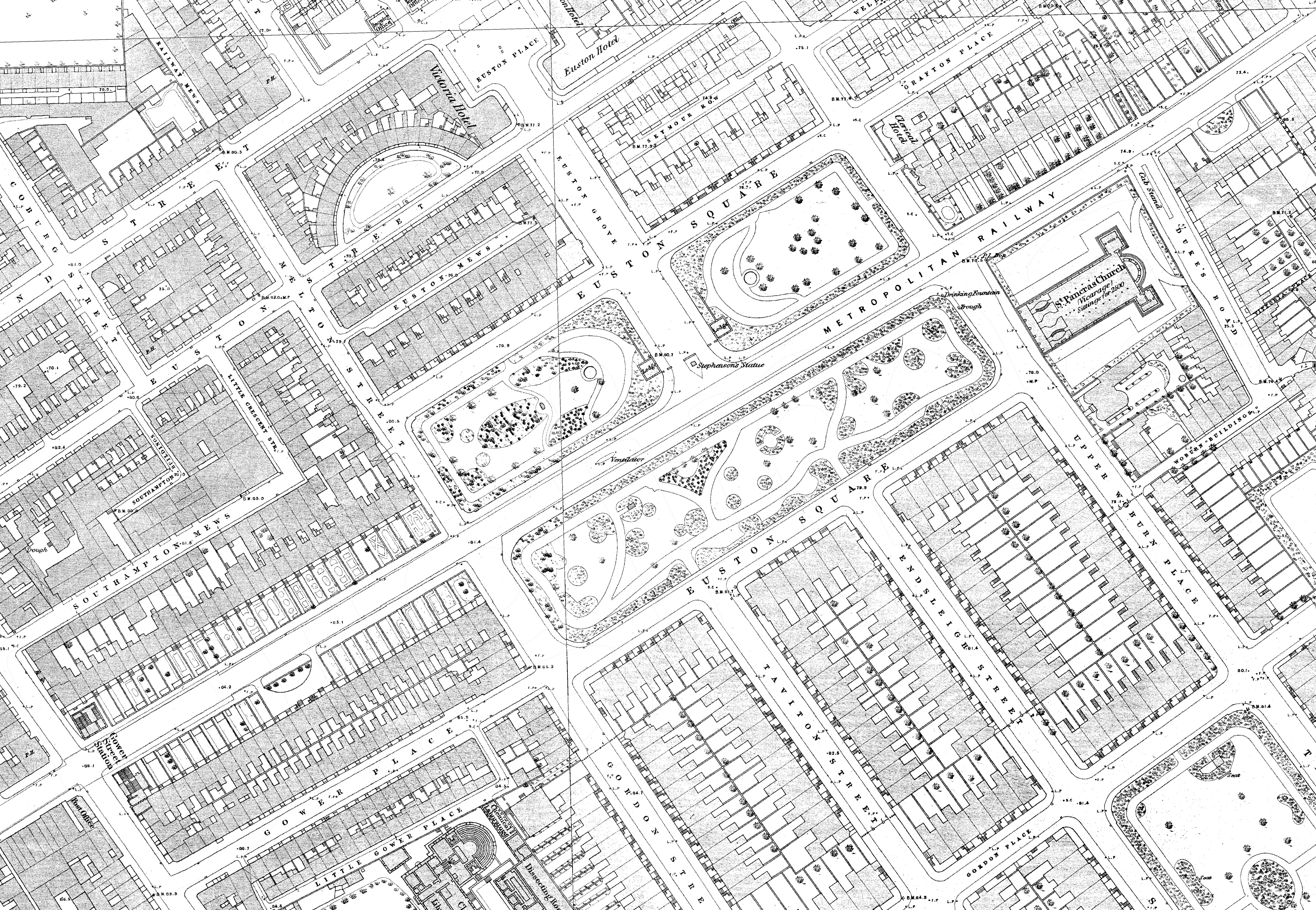
Euston Square on an 1874 Ordnance Survey map

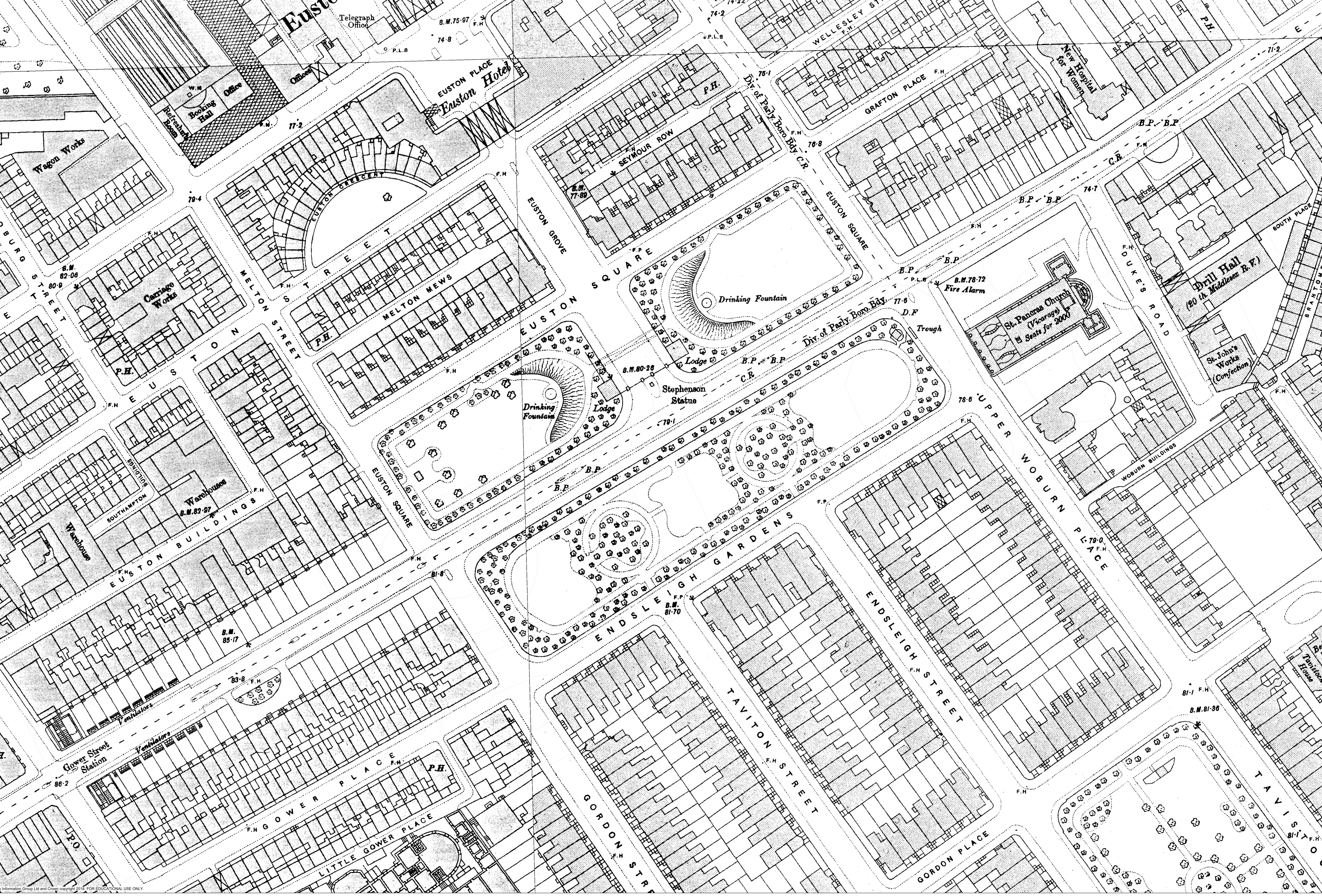
Endsleigh Gardens on an 1895 Ordnance Survey map after renaming

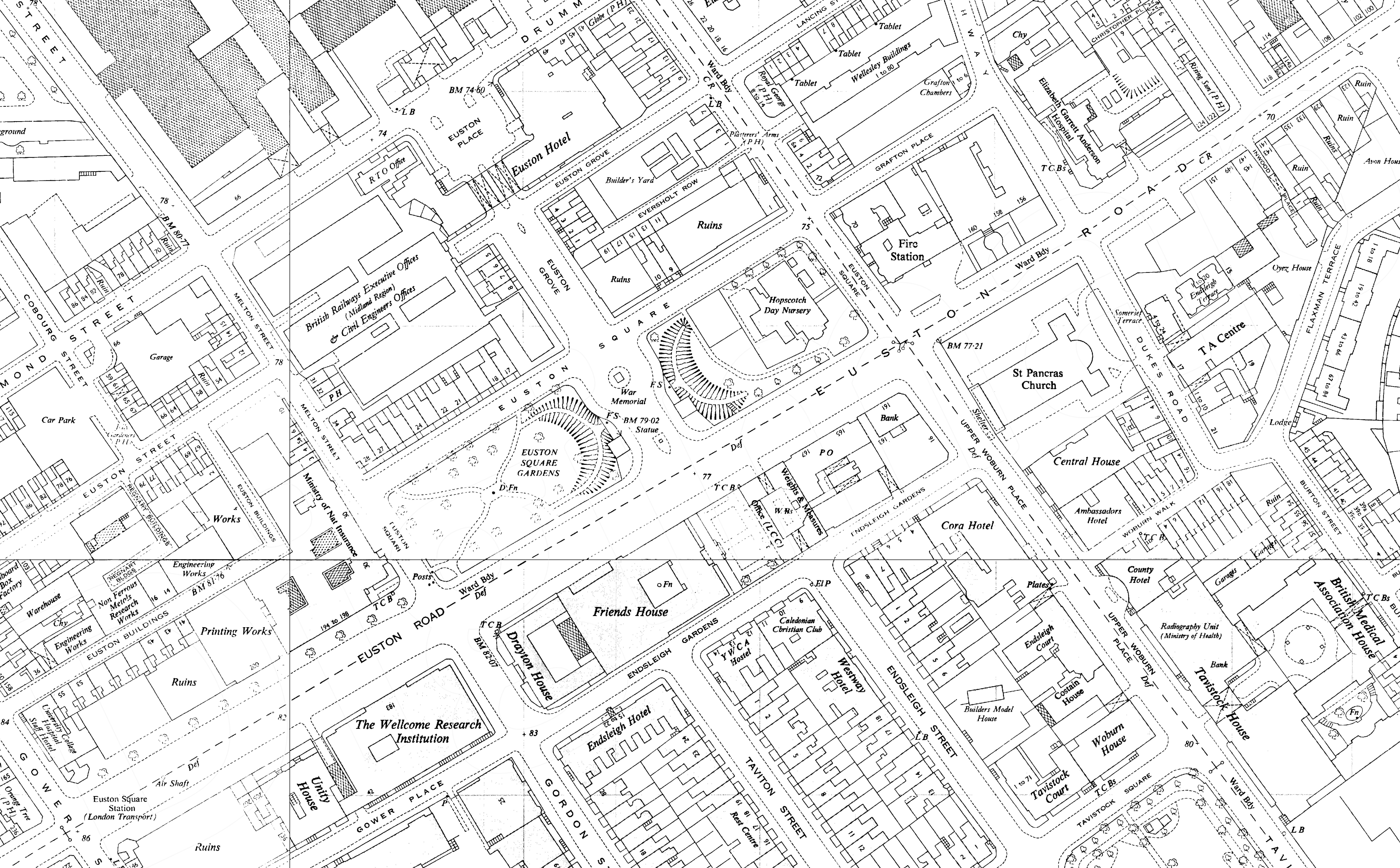
1953 Ordnance Survey map
