= Saravan =

Saravan or Sarawan may refer to:

- Saravan, Iran, a city in Sistan and Baluchestan Province, Iran
  - Saravan County
- Sarawan, an area in Balochistan, Pakistan
- Saravan, Gilan, a village in Gilan Province, Iran
  - Saravan Rural District
- Saravan, Armenia, a village in Armenia
- Aswaran, Sassanian cavalry

== See also ==
- Wat Saravan, a temple in Phnom Penh, Cambodia
- Salavan (disambiguation), places in Laos
- Sravana (disambiguation)
