= Salavan =

Salavan may refer to:

- Salavan Province, Laos
- Salavan (district), Laos
- Salavan (city), Laos

== See also ==
- Saravan (disambiguation)
