= Curry in the Crown: The Story of Britain's Favourite Dish =

- Curry in the Crown: The Story of Britain's Favourite Dish
- Author: Shrabani Basu
- Language: English
- Subject: Food
- Publication date: 1999
- Publication place: India
- Pages: 206
- ISBN: 978-8172233471

Curry in the Crown: The Story of Britain's Favourite Dish is a book written by Shrabani Basu. It was originally published in India in 1999, and later published in the United Kingdom under the title Curry: The Story of the Nation's Favourite Dish. The book discusses how Indian food became a million dollar business in the United Kingdom.

HarperCollins published the book in India, whilst Sutton Publishing published the book in the United Kingdom. The British version includes a guide to restaurants in the United Kingdom which serve curry.

== Reception ==
Tunku Varadarajan, writing in India Today, said that the history of Indian food in the United Kingdom was a compelling story. However he called Basu's book "shoddily written and mind-bogglingly banal", offering "no anthropological insights, few historical perspectives, no literary conspectus, little sociological research".

Colin Paterson of the Sunday Sun wrote that he wished that the restaurant guide covered the Tyne and Wear area.
