= Spy Princess =

2006 book by Shrabani Basu

Spy Princess: The Life of Noor Inayat Khan
- First edition, Sutton, 2006.
- Author: Shrabani Basu
- Language: English
- Subject: Biography
- Set in: Moscow, London, Paris
- Publisher: Sutton Publishing (2006); The History Press (2nd edition, 2008)
- Publication place: United Kingdom
- ISBN: 978-0-7524-6368-1

Spy Princess: The Life of Noor Inayat Khan is a book that traces the life of children's story writer and decorated British secret agent of the Second World War, Noor Inayat Khan. It was researched and written by Shrabani Basu, and first published in the United Kingdom in 2006 by Sutton Publishing. The book has a foreword by M. R. D. Foot and contains information from her formerly secret personal Special Operations Executive (SOE) files, released in 2003.

After a prologue detailing Khan's final journey to Dachau concentration camp in 1944, early chapters cover her ancestral link to Tipu Sultan and early life in Moscow, London and Paris. In 1940, just before Paris was occupied, she escaped with her family to Britain and volunteered for the Women's Auxiliary Air Force (WAAF). A fluent French speaker and a trained radio operator, she was soon recruited by the SOE, a secret British organisation. In June 1943, she became the first woman radio operator to be infiltrated into occupied France, before being betrayed and caught by the Gestapo.

The book featured in the BBC's Woman's Hour in 2006 and was reviewed by Khushwant Singh who felt it filled in gaps left by previous biographies of Khan, and Boyd Tonkin who suggested that Khan's story should be taught in British schools. As a result of her work on the book, Basu helped form the Noor Inayat Khan Memorial Trust. In 2021, it was announced that Spy Princess would be adapted into a television series.

== Background ==
Spy Princess is a biography of Noor Inayat Khan, a descendant of Tipu Sultan, and the first woman radio operator to be infiltrated into occupied France during the Second World War. It is authored by Shrabani Basu, who includes details collected from interviews with Khan's friends and relatives including her brothers Hidayat and Vilayat. It includes extracts from Madeleine, a biography of Khan by her friend Jean Overton Fuller, and information from Khan's formerly secret Special Operations Executive (SOE) files, released in 2003.

Khan was born in Moscow to an Indian father, Inayat Khan, and an American mother, Ora Ray Baker. Her father was a Sufi preacher and she was brought up in a house filled with music and meditation. Her book Twenty Jataka Tales was published in 1939 in the UK. In the foreword, Michael Foot writes that the book answers some questions as to why "an innocent like this" ended up in occupied France "at all". She was killed by the Nazis at Dachau concentration camp on 13 September 1944, and was posthumously awarded at first the Croix de Guerre by France and later the George Cross by Britain. According to Basu in Spy Princess, Khan found it difficult to see any country invaded.

== Publication ==
Spy Princess was first published by Sutton Publishing (now The History Press) in 2006 and launched in London by the Indian High Commissioner Kamalesh Sharma at an event attended by Ian Jack and Sir Gulam Noon. A second edition was published by The History Press in 2008, with subsequent reprints in 2010, 2016, 2019 and 2020.

The book has been translated into Marathi, published by Mehata Pablisinga Hausa. Other publishers include the Lotus Collection imprint of Roli Books, Omega Publications in the US in 2006, with a preface by Khan's nephew Zia Inayat Khan, and a large print version in 2007, published by W. F. Howes.

The 2020 reprint of the second edition has 10 chapters, preceded by a map of the Prospect circuits in France, a foreword by M. R. D. Foot, acknowledgements and an introduction. In the book, Basu acknowledges Sutton Publishing for first commissioning and publishing it. Following a section titled 'Aftermath' are four appendices, which list the French Resistance circuits, the names of people who helped Khan, a chronology of events and a list of Indians awarded the Victoria Cross and the George Cross between 1939 and 1945. There are citations to references listed in the notes section, and a bibliography and an index. It has 286 pages, in addition to eight pages of photographs. There are no footnotes.

== Synopsis ==
After a prologue describing Khan's final journey to Dachau, early chapters cover her ancestry and early life in Moscow, London and Paris. The book dispels some previously held accounts of Khan, including dismissing that she was recruited during a tiger-hunt in India, that her father was associated with Rasputin and recruited by him, and that she was born in the Kremlin, and states that many former romanticised accounts were nothing less than "pure fantasy".

In 1940, just before Paris was occupied, she escaped with her family to the UK and volunteered for the Women's Auxiliary Air Force (WAAF). A fluent French speaker and a trained radio operator, she was soon recruited by the Special Operations Executive (SOE), a secret British organisation. In June 1943, code-named Nora Baker, she became the first woman radio operator to be infiltrated into occupied France. Her brief was to assist the Prosper circuit and the French Resistance. Within a week, she was the only radio operator left in Paris, as members of her network fell to the Gestapo, mostly due to betrayal by double agents. Determined to maintain communications between the Resistance and the SOE, she declined the opportunity to return to London, and continued to transmit messages, avoiding being captured while repeatedly changing her looks and locations. Her work allowed safe passage of several SOE members, in addition to supplies of money and ammunition to the French Resistance.

She was however betrayed and caught by the Gestapo, and was sent at first to 84 Avenue Foch and then ultimately Dachau after 10-months of imprisonment and torture, but she revealed nothing. Despite sending the appropriate warning code that should have alerted the SOE to her capture, the SOE did not believe her and the Germans continued to use her transmitter to send messages to London, leading to the deaths of several SOE members. In addition, she had misunderstood her instruction in filing her messages, resulting in her meticulously kept notebook falling into the hands of the Gestapo.

Further details of Khan's execution are detailed near the end, before discussing the search for information on her time in capture and circumstances of death.

== Characters ==
=== Khan family and friends ===
- Ameena Begum
- Nadia Boulanger
- Jean Overton Fuller
- Inayat Khan
- Hidayat Inayat Khan
- Vilayat Inayat Khan

=== SOE and French Resistance ===
- Francine Agazarian
- Jack Agazarian
- France Antelme
- Vera Atkins
- Yolande Beekman
- Nicolas Bodington
- Andrée Borrel
- Maurice Buckmaster
- Yvonne Cormeau
- Madeleine Damerment
- Henri Déricourt
- Henri Garry
- Renee Garry
- Selwyn Jepson
- Cecily Lefort
- Leo Marks
- Gilbert Norman
- Eliane Plewman
- John Renshaw Starr
- Madeleine Tambour
- Germaine Tambour
- Francis Suttill

=== Nazis ===
- Max Wassmer
- Josef Gmeiner
- Josef Kieffer
- Ernest Vogt
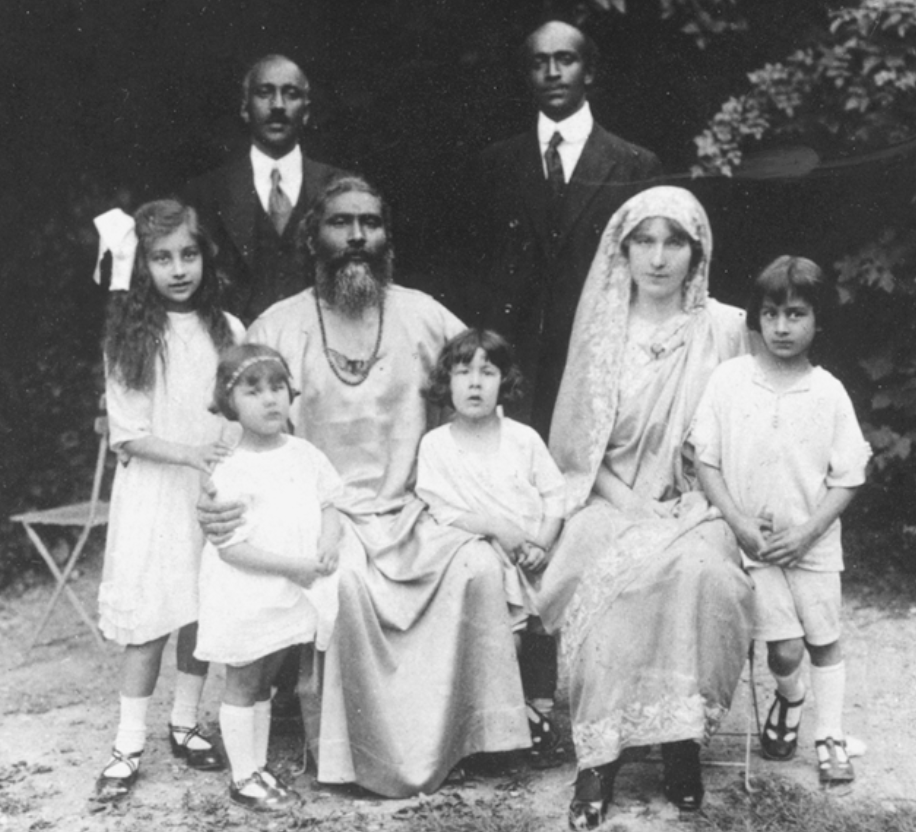
Inayat Khan family in Paris before 1926

Khan's mother Amina Begum

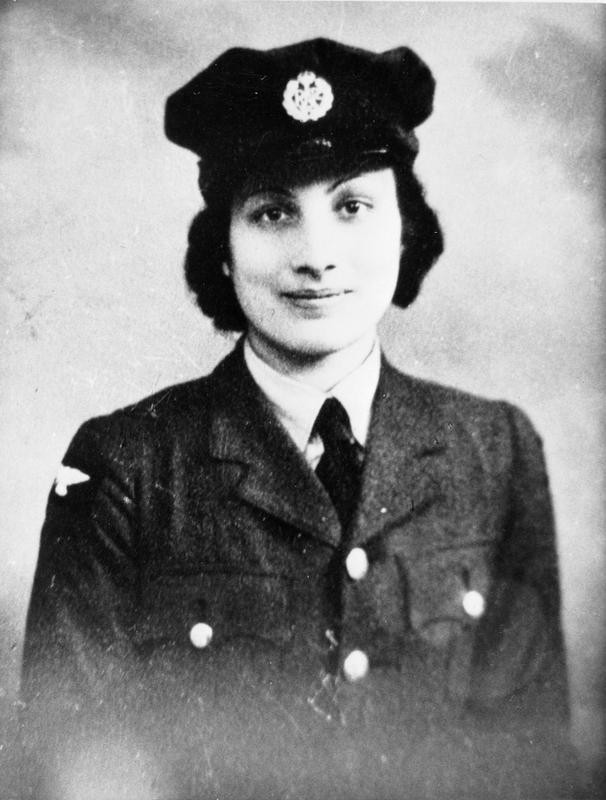
Khan in uniform

== Reception ==
The book featured in the BBC's Woman's Hour in early 2006. Later in the year it was reviewed in The Tribune by Khushwant Singh who wrote that the book "fills in gaps left in the earlier versions. It makes compelling reading. It is something Bollywood could take up as profit-making challenge". Boyd Tonkin, in The Independent, wrote that Khan "ought to be as popular a heroine in British schools as Florence Nightingale once was" and described the book as a "moving and scrupulous biography" that should be taught in British schools. In 2018, the book was referenced in an obituary on Khan in the New York Times, then included in an attempt to fill in missing female obituaries from the past.

As a result of her work on the book, Basu helped form the Noor Inayat Khan Memorial Trust, and to erect a bust of Khan, which was unveiled in 2012 at Gordon Square. In 2021, it was announced that the book would be adapted into a television series.

== Theatre ==
Between 21 September and 24 October 2026, the Orange Tree Theatre in Richmond, London performed a play called A Small and Quiet Light about Noor's wartime in Paris and her subsequent capture and demise, adapted by Stephanie Street from the book, and directed by Elin Schofield.
