= Saravanan =

- Gender: Male
- Language: Tamil

Origin
- Meaning: Murugan
- Region of origin: Southern India; North-eastern Sri Lanka

Other names
- Nickname: saro
- Derived: Murugan

Saravanan is a Tamil male given name. Due to the Tamil tradition of using patronymic surnames, it may also be a surname for males and females. It is one of the names of the Hindu god Murugan. It may refer to:

- Saravanan (actor)
- M. Saravanan (producer)
- M. Saravanan (film director)
- Mariappan Saravanan (1972–1999), Indian Army officer
- Saravanan Murugan (born 1968), Tamil Malaysian politician
- Saravanan Meenatchi, Tamil soap opera on Vijay TV
- Pudhukottaiyilirundhu Saravanan, 2004 Tamil film
- Sakthi Saravanan, Indian cinematographer
- V. Saravanan (born 1978), former Malaysian football player
- Govindasamy Saravanan (born 1970), Malaysian race walker
- Tiruchy L. Saravanan, flute player
- Saravanan Engira Surya, a 2015 Tamil film
- Senthil Kumar (born 1978), Indian film and television actor also known as Mirchi Saravanan
- Suriya (born 1975), Tamil actor whose real name is Saravanan Sivakumar,
- Saravanan Michael Ramalingam (1971–1996), Singaporean murder victim.
- Vishnu Saravanan (born 1999), Indian sailor
- Saravanan movie name Ratsasan 2018 as triple role Christopher Fernandez, Mary Fernandez & Annabella George
