= Shrabani Basu =

Indian journalist and historian

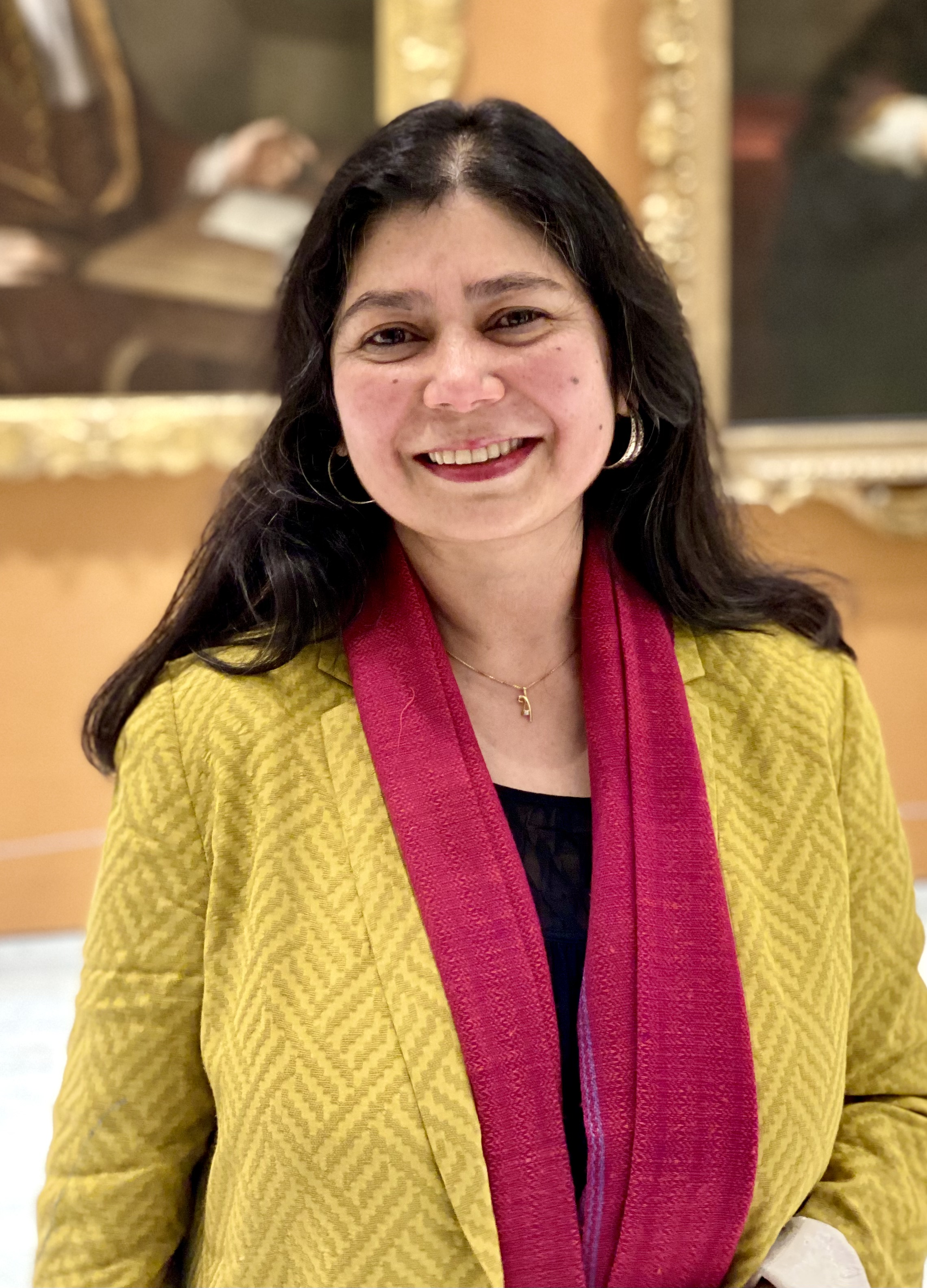
- Shrabani Basu (Osler Club of London, Royal College of Physicians, London (2022))
- Born: Kolkata, India
- Education: St. Stephen's College, Delhi; Delhi University
- Occupations: Journalist; Writer; Historian
- Children: 2
- Writing career
- Genre: History
- Subject: British Empire
- Notable works: Curry: The Story of Britain's Favourite Dish (1999); Spy Princess (2006); For King and Another Country (2015); Victoria & Abdul (2017)
- Website: shrabanibasu.co.uk

Shrabani Basu is an Indian journalist and historian, best known for writing Spy Princess (2006), an account of the life of Noor Inayat Khan, and Victoria & Abdul (2010), based on the friendship between Queen Victoria and Abdul Karim. She later compiled the stories of Indian men sent to Europe in the First World War, in For King and Another Country (2015). In The Mystery of the Parsee Lawyer (2021), she showed how Arthur Conan Doyle proved the innocence of George Edalji, an Indian lawyer in early twentieth century Midlands, England.

Basu's work has been adapted into the film Victoria & Abdul (2017), and has led to the founding of the Noor Inayat Khan Memorial Trust and a memorial to Khan, erected in Gordon Square, London. In 2020, she unveiled a Blue Plaque outside Khan's home on Taviton Street.

== Early life and education ==
Shrabani Basu was born in Kolkata to Chitta Ranjan Basu. She has two sisters. She grew up in Dhaka, Kathmandu and Delhi. She studied history at St Stephen’s College, Delhi, and gained a master's degree from Delhi University.

== Career ==
Basu's career in journalism started in 1983, when she became a trainee journalist for The Times of India in Mumbai. In 1987 she moved to London and worked for the Calcutta-based newspaper Anandabazar Patrika and The Telegraph.

=== Spy Princess ===
Basu studied Jean Overton Fuller's biography of Noor Inayat Khan, interviewed Khan's relatives, and extracted data from her SOE personal files, to write Spy Princess: The life of Noor Inayat Khan. It was published in 2006. Following her campaign for a memorial for Noor Inayat Khan in 2010, a bust in her memory was subsequently erected in Gordon Square, London, near Khan's house. Princess Anne unveiled the memorial in 2012. In 2020, Basu unveiled a Blue Plaque that was installed by English Heritage outside Khan's London home on Taviton Street. As of 2021, Spy Princess is being adapted into a TV series, written by Olivia Hetreed, and in consultation with Basu.

=== For King and Another Country ===
After compiling the stories of Indian men sent to Europe in 1914, she published For King and Another Country: Indian Soldiers on the Western Front, 1914–18 (2015), a book describing some of India's contributions in the First World War.

=== Victoria & Abdul ===
In the 1990s, during her research on the Curry: The Story of Britain's Favourite Dish, she came across the story of Abdul Karim. After carrying out historical research on the subject, using the Queen's own Urdu diaries and her physician, Sir James Reid's diaries, she wrote Victoria & Abdul, a book based on the friendship between Queen Victoria and Karim. It was then adapted into the film Victoria & Abdul (2017), which featured Dame Judi Dench and Ali Fazal.

=== The Mystery of the Parsee Lawyer ===
Basu's book The Mystery of the Parsee Lawyer, was released in 2021. It describes the story of a young Indian lawyer, George Edalji, who hired Arthur Conan Doyle to prove his innocence.

== Personal and family ==
Basu has two daughters.

== Honours and awards ==
In 2024, for her contributions to British and Indian history, the University of London awarded Basu with an honorary Degree of Doctor of Literature.

== Publications ==
- Curry: The Story of Britain's Favourite Dish. History Press Limited. 1999. ISBN 978-0-7509-9420-0.
- Spy Princess: The life of Noor Inayat Khan. Stroud, Gloucestershire: Sutton Publishing. 2006. ISBN 978-0-7524-6368-1. OCLC 1043350666.
- Victoria & Abdul: The true story of the queen's closest confidant. Stroud, Gloucestershire: The History Press. 2010. ISBN 978-0-7509-8258-0. OCLC 495598872.
- Basu, Shrabani (2014). Re-imagine: India-U.K. cultural relations in the 21st Century. Bloomsbury. ISBN 978-93-82951-34-6. OCLC 872379543.
- For king and another country: Indian soldiers on the Western Front 1914-18. London: Bloomsbury Publishing. 2015. ISBN 978-93-85436-49-9. OCLC 930453170.
- The Mystery of the Parsee Lawyer: Arthur Conan Doyle, George Edalji and the case of the foreigner in the English village. London: Bloomsbury Publishing. 2021. ISBN 978-1-5266-1528-2. OCLC 1233312355.

== Gallery ==
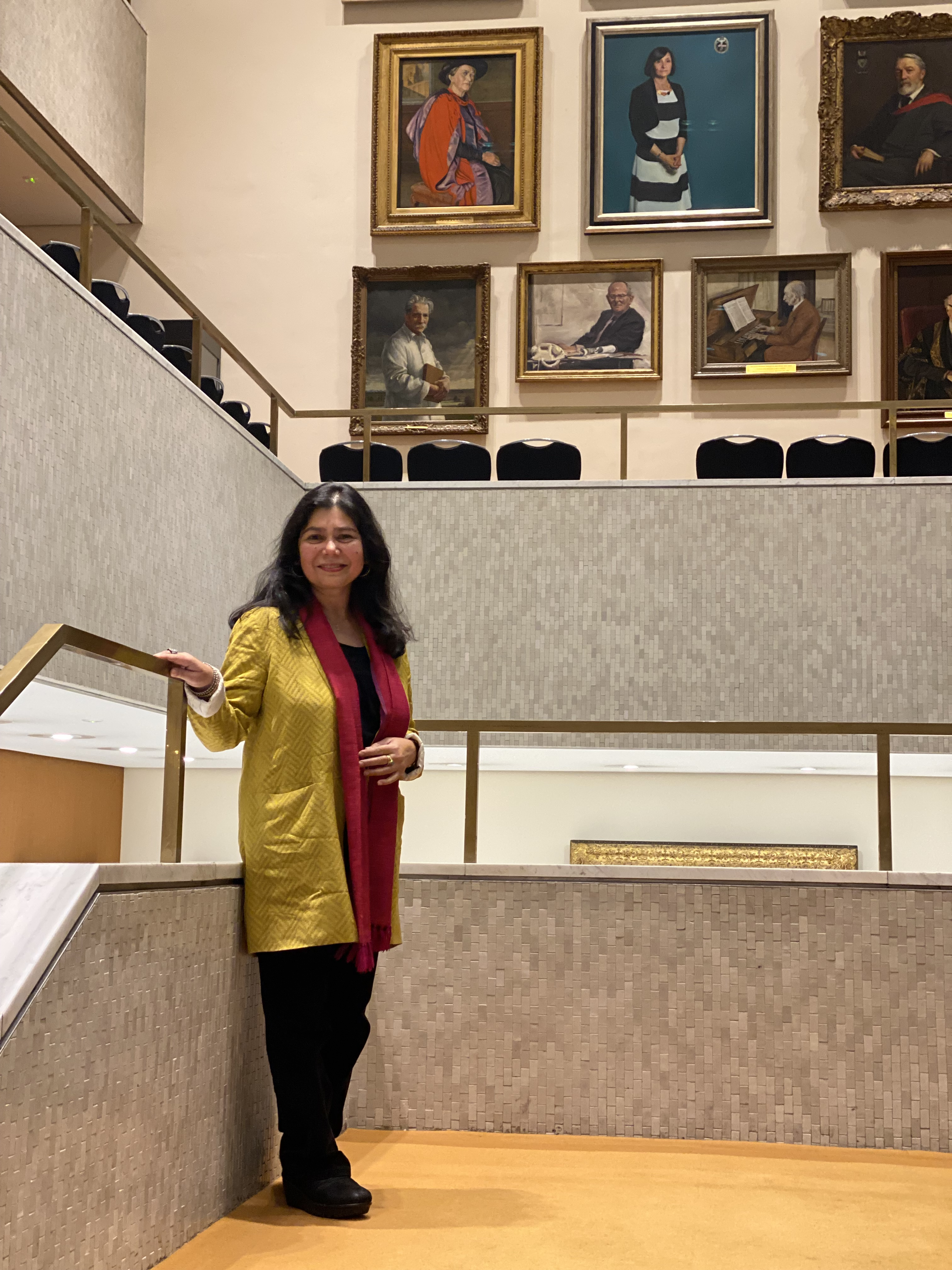
Shrabani Basu, Royal College of Physicians

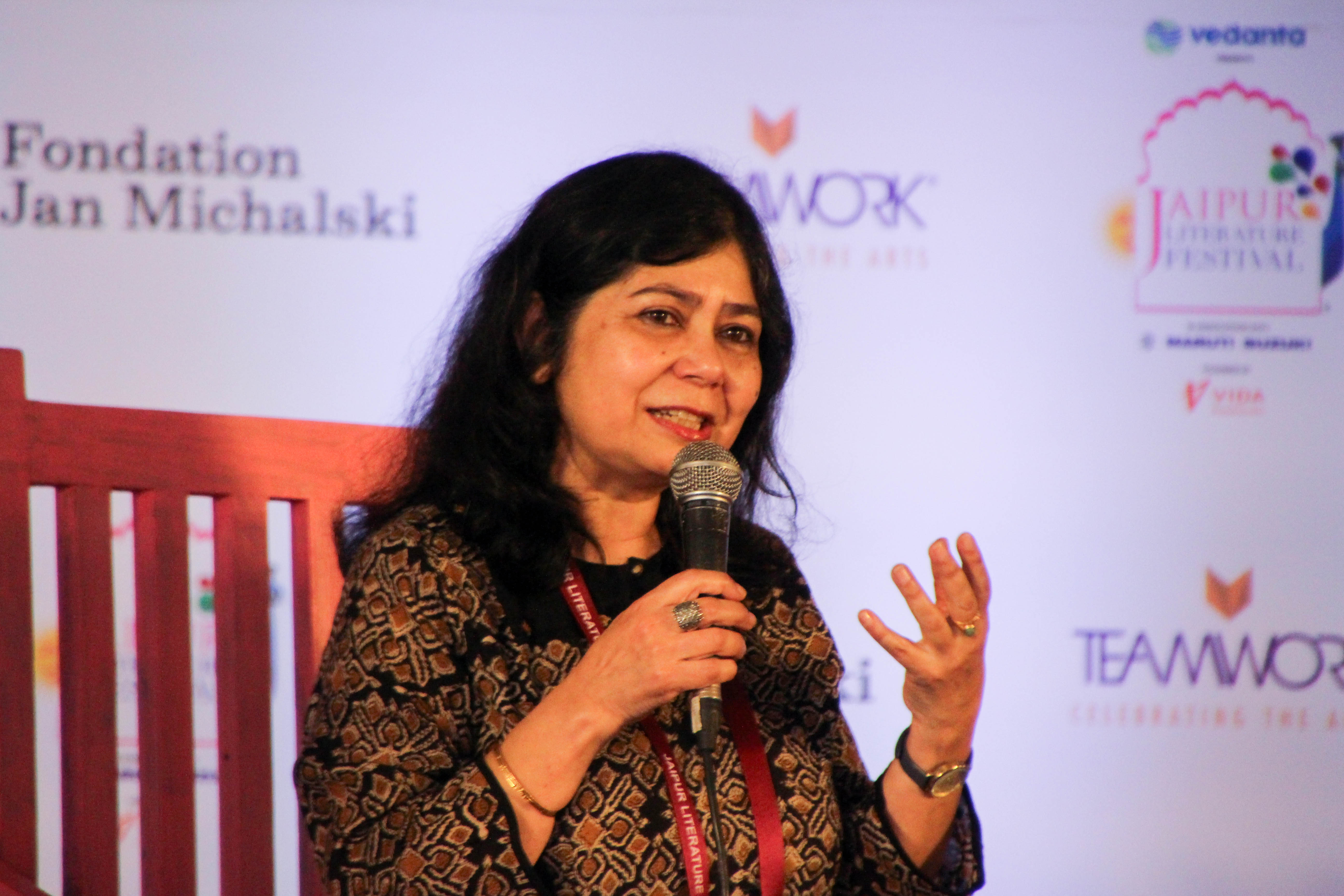
Basu at the 2025 Jaipur Literature Festival
