= Taviton Street =

Street in Bloomsbury, London

Coordinates: 51°31′32.17″N 0°7′54.07″W

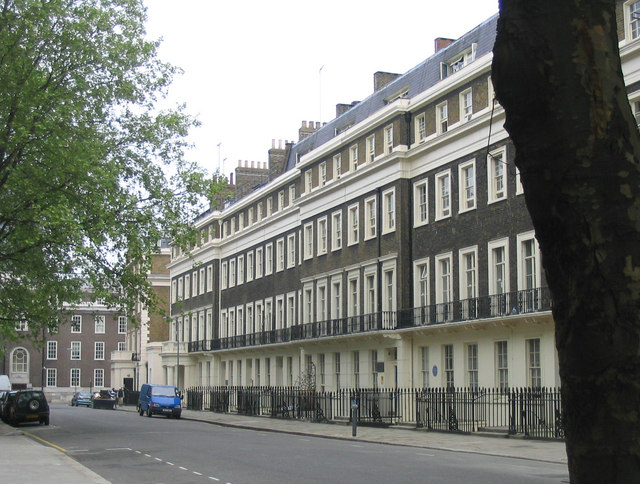
Taviton Street. looking north.

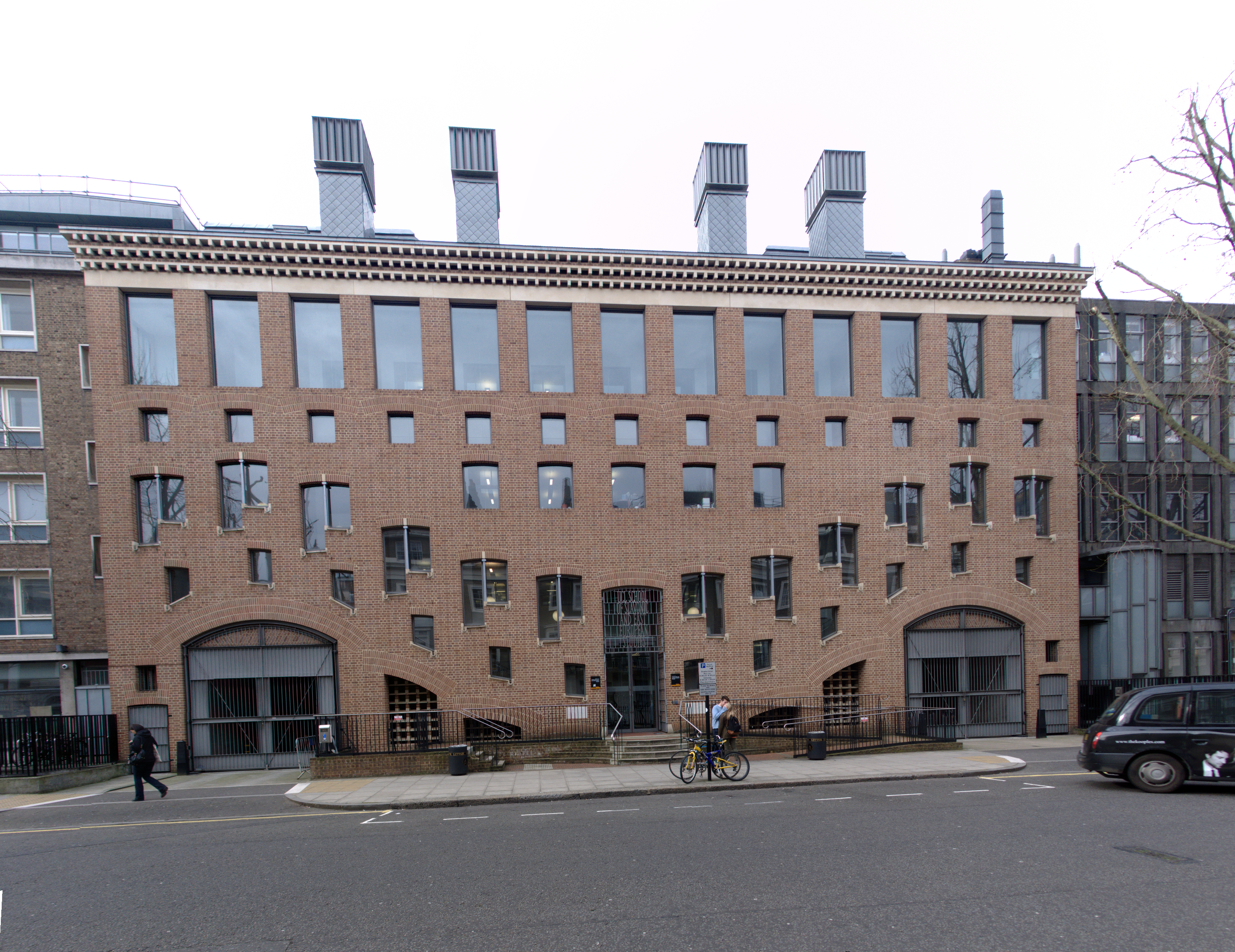
UCL's School of Slavonic and East European Studies

Taviton Street is a street in the Bloomsbury district of central London, in the London Borough of Camden. It runs between Endsleigh Gardens in the north and Gordon Square and Endsleigh Place in the south. University College London's School of Slavonic and East European Studies (SSEES) moved into new buildings on the western side in 2005. UCL's Campbell House halls of residence occupy the original building on the East and West side of the street. The Department of Anthropology occupies 14 Taviton Street and beside it the back of the Christopher Ingold Building (CIB), built in 1970 houses UCL's Department of Chemistry. The original design of the CIB called for two further phases that would have cut Taviton Street in two, and occupied the area now occupied by SSEES and Campbell House.

== Former residents ==
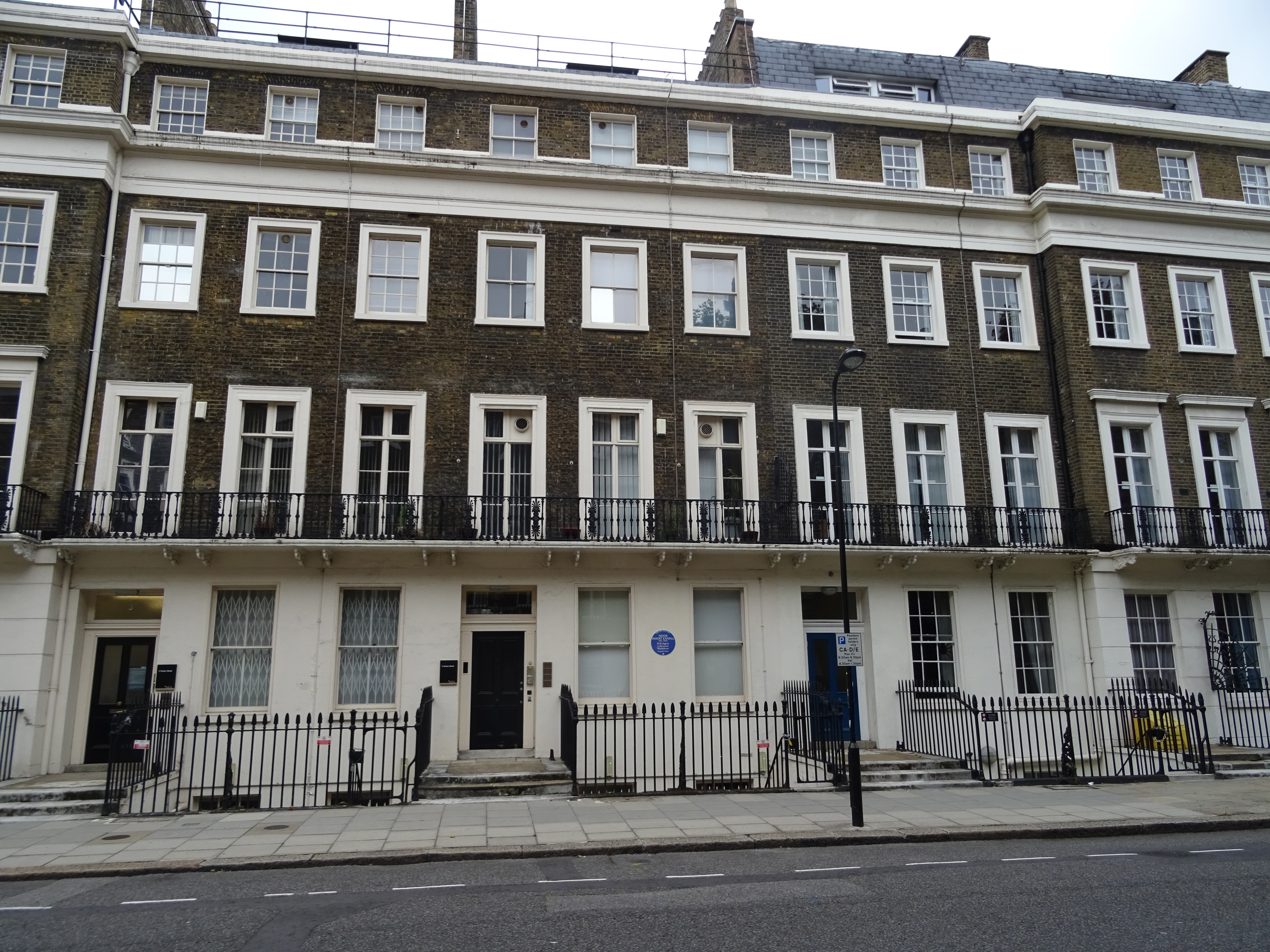
4 Taviton Street: Noor Inayat Khan blue plaque

According to the Survey of London, the former residents include:

- No. 6. 1853, Rev. Jasper Peck.
- No. 8. 1888–1902, Hugh Price Hughes (1847–1902), Methodist divine and leader of the "forward" party in Methodism. Edited the Methodist Times.
- No. 10. 1893–1900, Rev. William Tundall.
- No. 17. 1866–1877, The Dowager Viscountess Sidmouth. Born Mary Young, eldest daughter of Rev. John Young, rector of Thorpe Malsor, Northamptonshire. She married William Leonard Addington, second Viscount Sidmouth, in 1820.
- No. 20. 1862–1866, Rev. J. Fearnley.
- No. 24. 1883–1885, Rev. James Mathew Roberton.

Noor Inayat Khan once resided in Taviton Street.
