= Rafiuddin Ahmed =

Sir, Maulvi Rafiuddin Ahmed
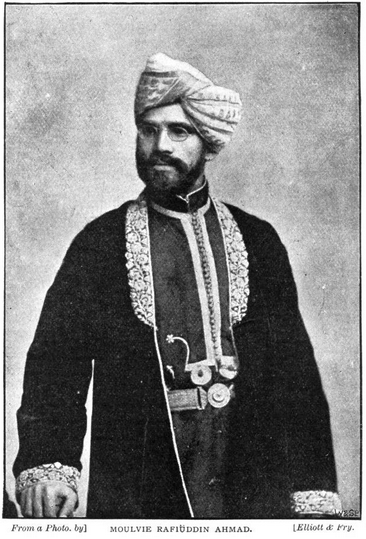

Minister of Agriculture and Minister of Education
- In office 1928–1934

Personal details
- Born: 1865
- Died: 1954 (aged 88–89)
- Education: Deccan College, Pune; King's College London; Middle Temple

Sir Rafiuddin Ahmed (1865–1954) was an Indian Muslim barrister, journalist and politician. He was generally known as the Moulvi.

He was educated at Deccan College, Pune, and King's College London. In 1892, he became a barrister-at-law in the Middle Temple. He was a close friend of Abdul Karim (the Munshi), the Indian secretary of Queen Victoria.

Victoria was instrumental in involving Ahmed in diplomatic approaches to Sultan Abdul Hamid II of the Ottoman Empire in the late 1890s, and unsuccessfully suggested that he be appointed to the British embassy in Constantinople.

He was a prominent member of the Muslim Patriotic League, and under the Montagu–Chelmsford Reforms, which introduced greater self-government to British India, he was elected to the council of the Bombay Presidency. In 1928, he was appointed Minister of Agriculture and then as Minister of Education where he served till 1934. For his work in government, he was knighted in 1932.

He died in his native Pune, where he had lived for the last 20 years of his life.
