= Shrawan Kumar =

Shrawan Kumar may refer to:

- Shravana Kumara, a fictional character in the ancient Indian epic Ramayana
- Shrawan Kumar (geneticist), Indian-American geneticist
- Shrawan Kumar (mathematician) (born 1953), Indian-American mathematician
- Shrawan Kumar (politician) (born 1957), Indian politician in Bihar

== See also ==
- Sharwan Kumar (born 1947), Indian politician in Rajasthan
- Shravan Kumar Goswami, Indian writer
- Shravan Kumar Patyal, Indian lieutenant
- Shravan Kumar Rathod, Indian music composer
