= Harriet Phipps =

English courtier (1841–1922)

The Honourable Harriet Lepel Phipps, VA
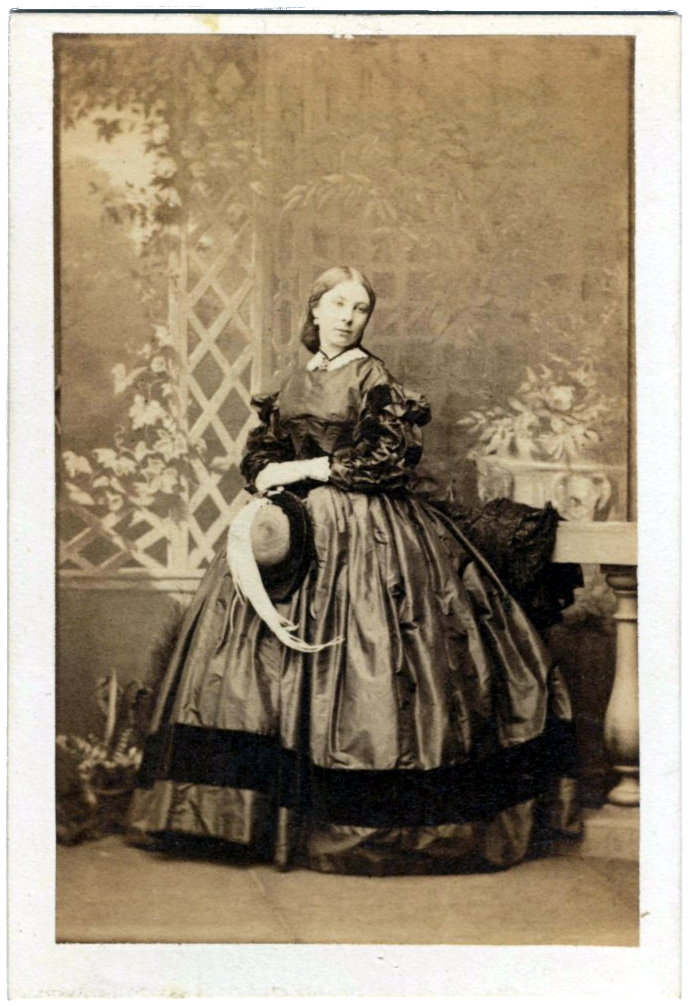
- Harriet Lepel Phipps photography by Camille Silvy
- Born: 22 January 1841
- Died: 7 March 1922 (aged 81)
- Occupation: courtier
- Father: Charles Beaumont Phipps
- Awards: Royal Order of Victoria and Albert

The Hon. Harriet Lepel Phipps, VA (22 January 1841 – 7 March 1922) was an English courtier who served as a confidential attendant of Queen Victoria.

== Family ==
Phipps was born in 1841. She was the youngest daughter of Sir Charles Beaumont Phipps, a courtier, confidant of the Queen, and Keeper of the Privy Purse.

== Career ==
Phipps was appointed Maid of Honour in Ordinary to the Queen on 3 March 1862 (giving her the courtesy rank of a baron's daughter), and later served as a Woman of the Bedchamber from 1889 until Victoria's death. She often accompanied the Queen during visits, including the April 1900 visit to Ireland.

Phipps was used by the Queen to carry out confidential errands, and had access to many secrets, which she faithfully kept. Her papers were destroyed upon her death. She was decorated with the Royal Order of Victoria and Albert, 4th class.

Marie Mallet, a fellow lady of the bedchamber, found Phipps as a messenger of instructions from Victoria "the embodiment of early Victorian traditions, discreet almost to a fault, full of little mysteries," but also described her as "gay and excellent company and always warm-hearted".

Her 1889 portrait, by John Lavery, is now in the collection of the Glasgow Museums.

== Personal life ==
She died unmarried and childless on 7 March 1922.

== Cultural depictions ==
Phipps was portrayed by Fenella Woolgar in the 2017 film Victoria & Abdul.
