= Steve Jameson =

American artist (born 1973)

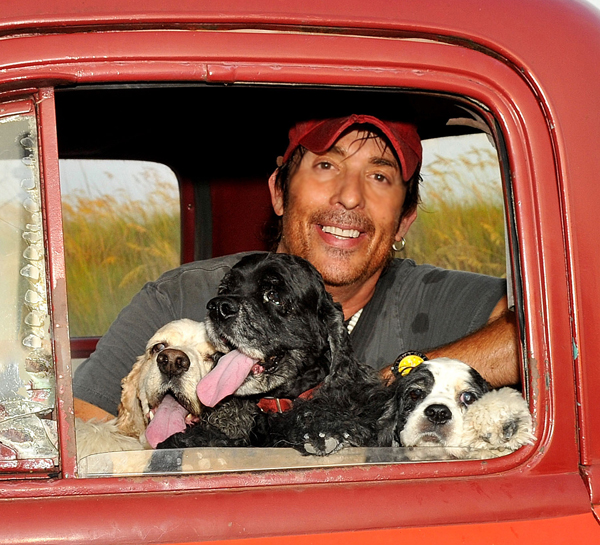
- Jameson with his cocker spaniels in Myrtle Beach, South Carolina, in 2009
- Born: Charles Stephen Jameson; May 6, 1973 (age 53); Fort Knox, Kentucky, U.S.
- Website: www.cedarartstudio.com

Charles Stephen "Steve" Jameson (born May 6, 1973) is a United States painter and children's book illustrator. Jameson paints under two brush names: "Cedar" and "Wodin".

Books illustrated by Jameson include Just Imagine, God Brother, Dreaming of the Beloved, and Cooking with Katie.

In 2009, Jameson was elected into the National Watercolor Society.

== Early life ==
Steve Jameson was born in 1973 at Fort Knox, Kentucky, United States, and grew up in nearby Elizabethtown; he was the oldest of seven children.

Steve first went to a private Catholic school, St. James Elementary, and later attended Elizabethtown Catholic High School, both of Saint James Parish in Elizabethtown, Kentucky. He also attended Elizabethtown High School, where he graduated. Following high school, he studied at the University of Kentucky, Lexington. He majored in architecture and fine art.

At the age of 22, Steve came to spiritually follow the teachings of Meher Baba while visiting Meher Spiritual Center in Myrtle Beach, South Carolina.

== His life in Myrtle Beach ==
At the age of 29, Steve moved to live near the Meher Spiritual Center in Myrtle Beach, South Carolina where many disciples of Meher Baba make their homes. He opened a sign shop called The Sign Man, making custom, sandblasted, illustrated & gilded residential signs for tourists to make a living for himself. He uses his sign shop as his painting studio.

Jameson, under the painting name of "Wodin", has become a prolific painter of the image of Avatar Meher Baba. Hundreds of his paintings are in private collections all over the world.

Steve has visited Meher Baba's Samadhi (tomb shrine) in Ahmednagar, India three times. On these pilgrimages, he met the last remaining disciples of Meher Baba, including Baba's younger sister, Mani Irani. He became very close friends with Mani and illustrated two of her books; one of her childhood stores of life with her God-brother and another of her dreams of her God-realized brother. The first book Steve illustrated for Mani was "God Brother", published by Sheriar Books in 1993. The second book he illustrated for her was "Dreaming of the Beloved", published by Sheriar Books in 1998.

Jameson's greatest project has been the designing of his planned Daddy God Art Museum to be built on the South Carolina coast among other popular tourist destinations near the Meher Spiritual Center of Myrtle Beach.

== Fine art career ==
=== The Daddy God art series ===
Jameson first received public recognition for a series of artworks entitled DADDY GOD. These images of a spiritual figure are based on the physical form of Avatar Meher Baba. Jameson is widely recognized among the followers of Meher Baba to be one of the most popular, prolific and well-known painters of the physical form of Avatar Meher Baba. He has been selected as the illustrator-of-choice by several of Meher Baba's closest Mandali (spiritual disciples); including Meher Baba's sister Mani Irani and Katie Irani. He first illustrated God Brother (1994), a children's book by Mani Irani, sister of the Indian spiritual master Avatar Meher Baba. Later, Mani Irani again chose him to illustrate her last published book, Dreaming of the Beloved (1998), by Mani Irani. He won the Printing Industry of the Carolinas (PICA)'s First Place for a 4-color book illustration. Fellow disciple of Meher Baba, Katie Irani then selected Jameson to illustrate her book of anecdotes & recipes calledCooking with Katie (2003), by Katie Irani.

The Daddy God series
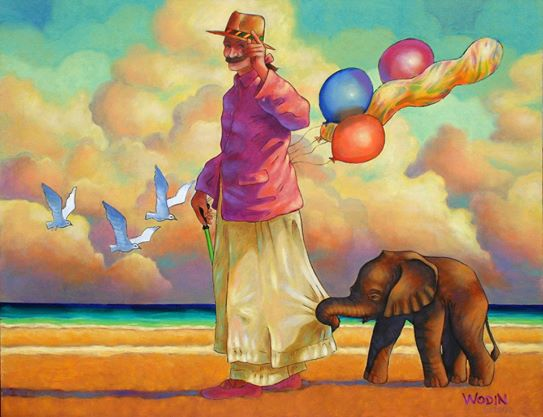
Oil on canvas, 56"x72", 2009, held in reserve for the future Daddy God Museum.

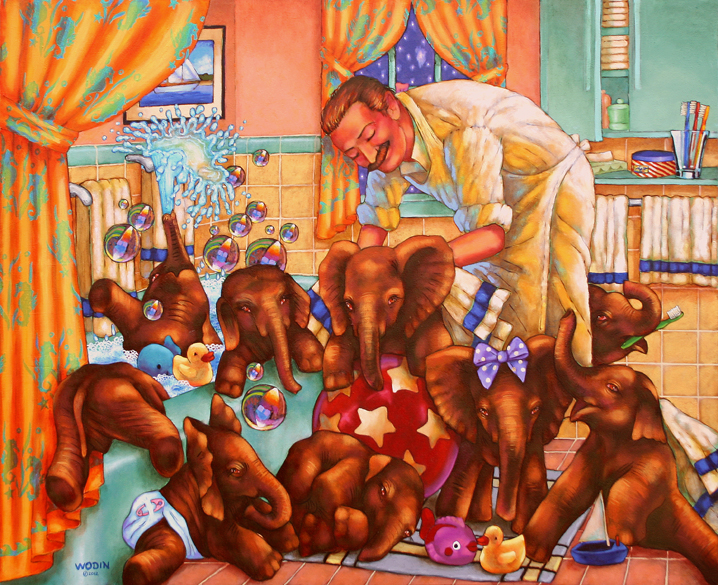
Oil on canvas, 56"x72", 2012, held in reserve for the future Daddy God Museum.

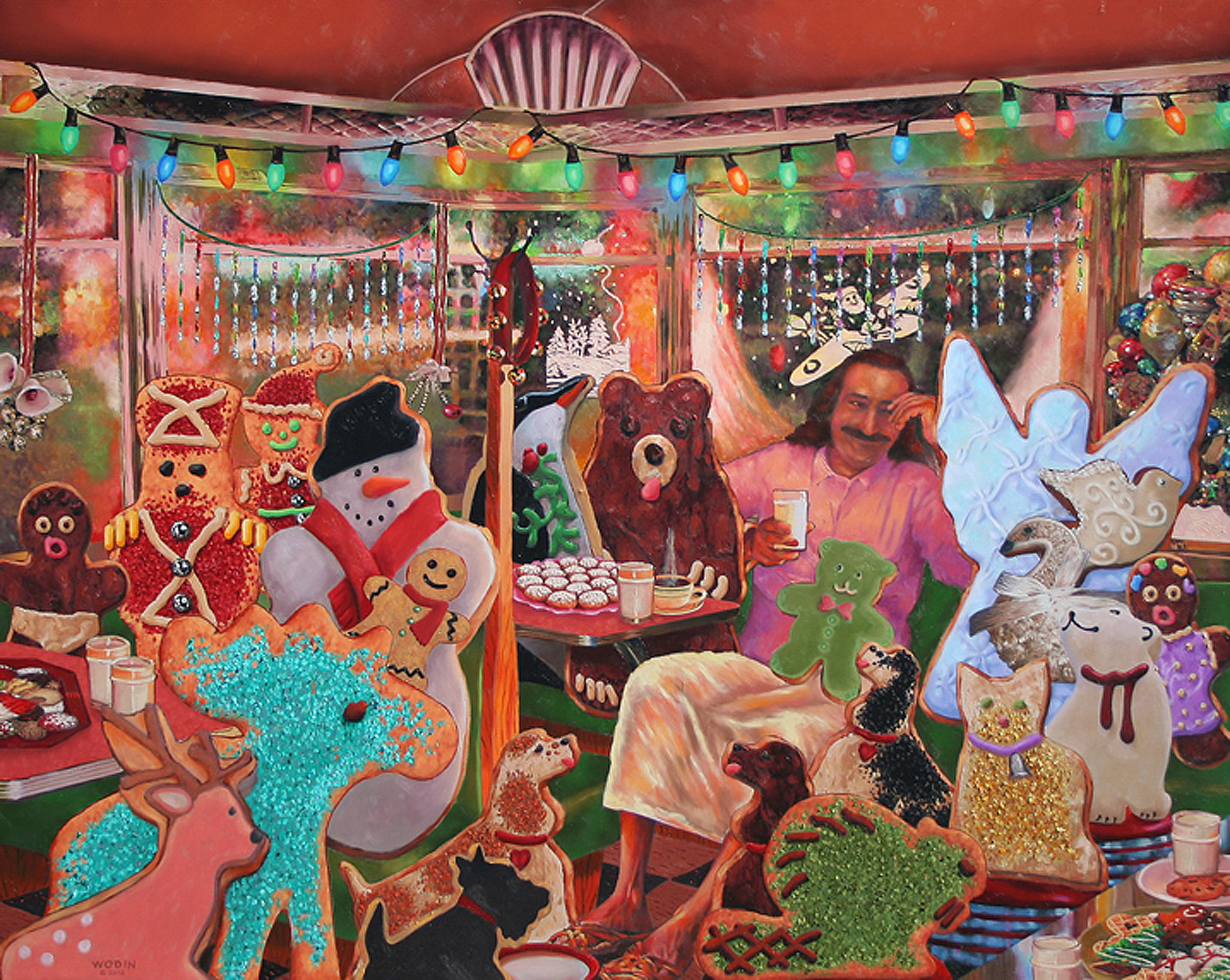
Oil on canvas, 56"x72", 2013, held in reserve for the future Daddy God Museum.

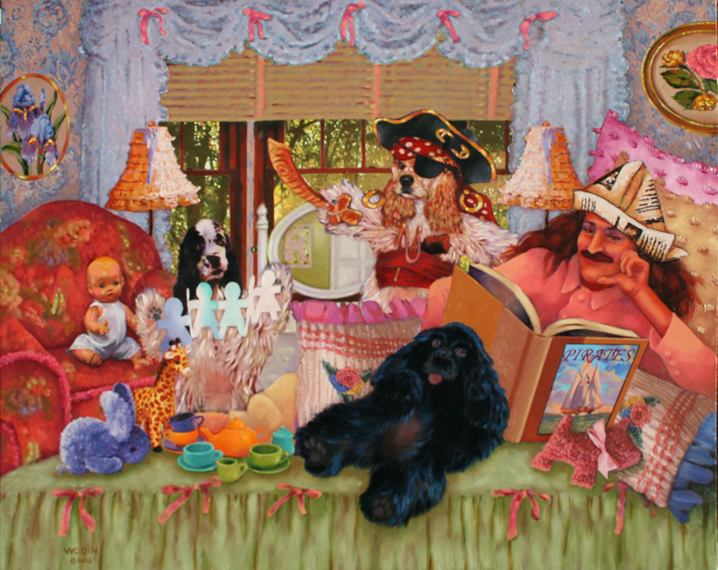
Oil on canvas, 56"x72", 2014, held in reserve for the future Daddy God Museum.

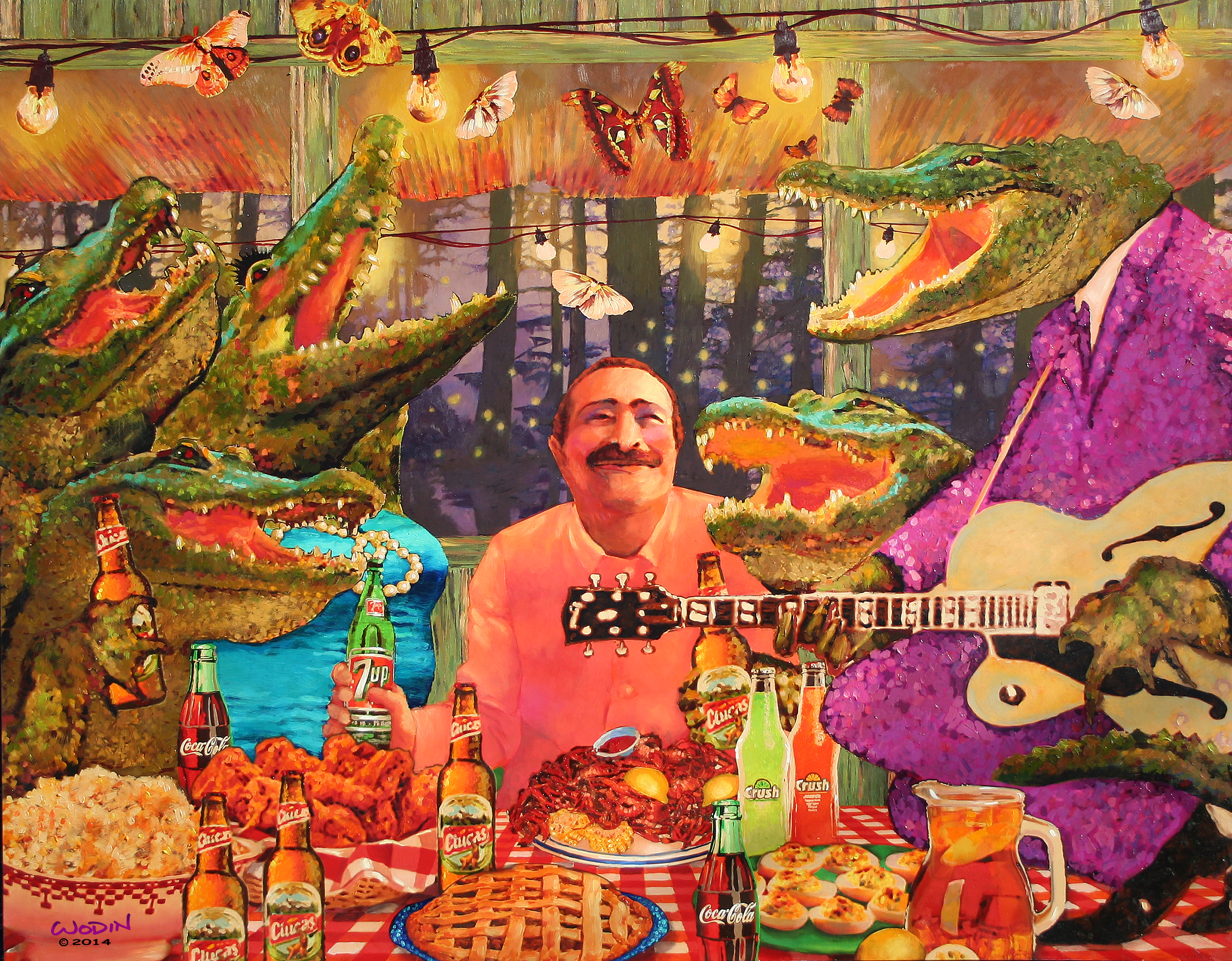
Oil on canvas, 56"x72", 2014, held in reserve for the future Daddy God Museum.

=== Videography ===
In 1996, Steve produced a set of animated videos entitled LIFE IS A PAIR O'DUCKS. Sixteen short stories written by Jameson are accompanied by sound effects, Hollywood music writer Kris Kraft's musical score, voice overs by actresses such as Jane Barry Haynes and Mani Irani, sister of Avatar Meher Baba; with videography by Emmy award-winning television producer Chris Riger. Riger also created the documentary films Meher Baba's Call, The Ancient One and others about the life of Avatar Meher Baba.

In 2010, guitarist and song composer Mischa Rutenberg used Jameson's artwork from his series DADDY GOD in his music videos THIS IS NOTHING BUT YOUR LOVE and KINDNESS.
