= Helen Dahm =

Swiss artist (1878–1968)

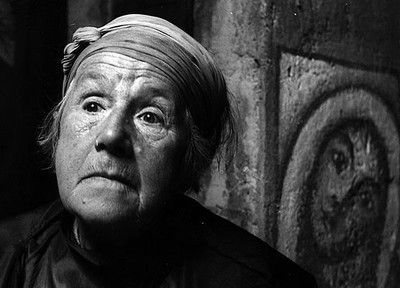
- Helen Dahm in Meherabad, India
- Born: May 21, 1878; Kreuzlingen, Switzerland
- Died: May 24, 1968 (aged 90); Männedorf, Switzerland
- Known for: Painter
- Movement: Expressionism

Helen Dahm (May 21, 1878 – May 24, 1968) was a Swiss artist and a follower of the expressionist movement.

Helen Dahm was born in Egelshofen (now Kreuzlingen), Switzerland. She studied art in Zurich and Munich. Her early work included hand-colored, hand-pressed fabric prints, mostly expressionistic in style. In the early 1930s, Helen suffered from severe depression and did very little art. However, a meeting with Meher Baba in Cannes, France, in 1937 had a profound effect on her. In 1938, by invitation of Meher Baba, Dahm came to live in his ashram in Meherabad, India and painted the interior murals in his would-be samadhi (tomb) that had been completed earlier that year. Her paintings are still viewable there today, as restored by American artist Dot Lesnik in 1989. For health reasons Dahm eventually returned to her homeland of Switzerland.

After this period, Dahm's work took an inspired religious turn, becoming occupied with imagery including expressionistic interpretations of paradise, the Pietà, the crucifixion of Christ and angels. After this period her work became increasingly abstract.

Helen Dahm only received recognition late in life. In 1967, at the age of 89, she had her first major retrospective exhibition in Switzerland.

Else Strantz was her life partner for twenty years, and it was through Strantz that Dahm met the Blue Rider group of artists, who were very influential to Dahm.
