= Meher Baba Newsreel Footage =

Series of 1932 newsreels

Meredith Starr interviewing Meher Baba in New York, 1932

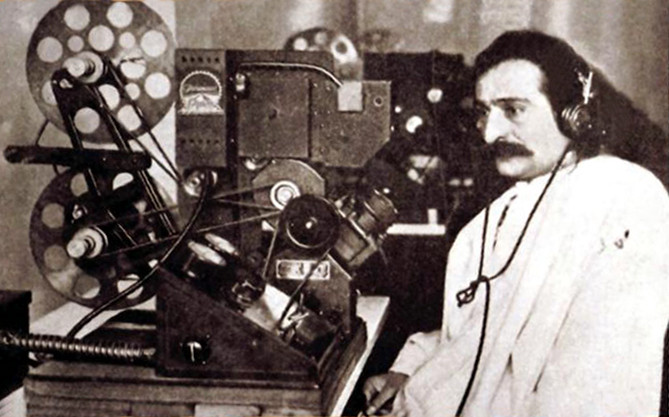
published by the Kinematograph Weekly, Meher Baba in Willesden, North West London, April 15, 1932, viewing a newsreel clip of himself at Paramount Studios. On April 15th, 1932, Paramount Film Studio sent two cars to bring Baba and his group to Willesden to see the film that was taken of him dictating from the alphabet board and being read out by Charles Purdom

Meher Baba Newsreel footage is a series of 1932 newsreels of Meher Baba's Messages to the west and his interviews with media at Croton-on-Hudson, New York, house of American actress Margaret Mayo in the United States, and Russell Square, 32 Russell Road, Kensington, London, England.

== Footage ==
The newsreel features Interviews with television personalities Meredith Starr, Charles Purdom, and British actor Quentin Tod among others. The reels were produced by 20th Century Fox Film Corporation for their Movietone News, and Paramount Pictures for their Paramount News series respectively. The freeze-framing shots on board the SS Bremen from New York City to Le Havre, at Hancock, New Hampshire, and North Devonshire retreat in 1932 were rediscovered in 1994 from a film archive in New York.
