= You Alone Exist =

1962 poem

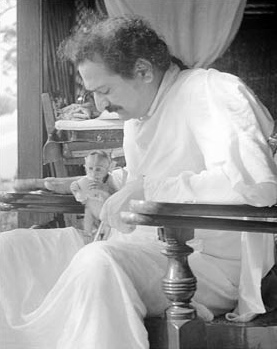
- First published in: 1962

You Alone Exist is a prayer poem describing the unlimited attributes of God. Dictated by Meher Baba during 1959-1962 to his close disciple Bhau Kalchuri, the prayer-poem expressively describes the all-pervading nature of God through many attributes, from simple to sublime.

== Text ==
The full text of the poem was written by Bhau Kalchuri under direction of Avatar Meher Baba.

== Music video ==
A 2005 collage film was directed and produced by Peter Nordeen with music composed and sung by Jim Meyer. The stock footage is compiled and edited together from Meher Baba Newsreel Footage (1932), Three Incredible Weeks (1954), Meherabad (1955), Meher Baba's USA Tour (1956/1958), Pune-Meherabad (1960), East-West Gathering (1962) by Robert Fredericks in tandem to the rhythm of the musical prayer.

== Bibliography ==
- D. E. Stevens (1986). Listen Humanity. Crossroad Pub.
- Robbins Thomas and Anthony Dick (1972). Getting Straight with Meher Baba. JSTOR.
