= Meredith Starr =

Roland Meredith Starr
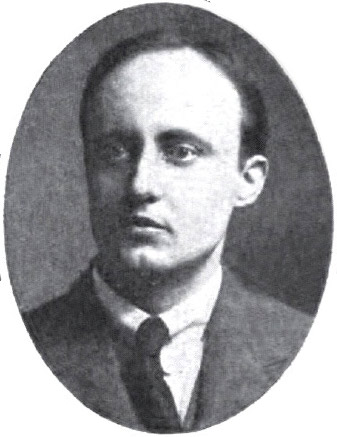
- Born: 29 December 1890; Middlesex, England
- Died: 13 December 1971 (aged 80); Suffolk, England
- Occupation(s): Poet, Mystic
- Spouse: Lady Mary Grey (1917-1930; div)
- Children: 2

Roland Meredith Starr (born Herbert Close; 29 December 1890 – 13 December 1971) was a British occultist and poet. He is credited with introducing Meher Baba to the West.

== Life ==
Starr was born in Prestbury House, Hampton, at Richmond in the County of Middlesex, England, to well-to-do land owning parents ("landed proprietors") William Brooks Close and Mary Baker Brooks Close. When Starr was one year old his parents separated and he was raised by his mother. He received his education at Winchester College in Hampshire. Starr was a psychologist, homeopath, occultist and an editorial writer. He was also the principal player in bringing Meher Baba to the West for the first time at the start of the 1930s, although he himself did not remain a follower for very long.

In the early 20th century, Starr wrote for The Occult Review, an illustrated monthly journal containing articles and correspondence by many notable occultists of the day, including Aleister Crowley, Arthur Edward Waite, W. L. Wilmshurst, Franz Hartmann, Florence Farr, and Herbert Stanley Redgrove. He probably changed his name to Meredith Starr when he was twenty in relation to his work as a reviewer and contributor for The Occult Review. He also wrote for Aleister Crowley's publication The Equinox, publishing Memory of Love (under the name "Herbert Close"), VII, 291 - Vol 7, in 1911.

Meredith Starr met Meher Baba in Toka, India on 30 June 1928. In 1931 Starr established a retreat center at East Challacombe, North Devon (a couple of miles from Combe Martin), where he invited Meher Baba to come and meet westerners. It was at the Devon retreat that many of Meher Baba's lasting followers from Europe and the United States first met Baba. Meredith was famously lacking in a sense of humor and had a particular sense of how spiritual conduct should be, thus enforcing strong codes of serious contemplative conduct that made even Meher Baba uncomfortable. Yet he is considered to have played a central role in introducing Meher Baba to the western world.

In December 1932, Starr grew irritated with Meher Baba and wrote to him, "Give me either the 400 pounds you owe me or illumination; otherwise, I will leave you and expose you as a fraud!" He then did leave Meher Baba. The money he referred to was money he had spent hosting Meher Baba at his retreat in Devon. Starr disbanded the Devon retreat and sold the property a year and a half later. He later organized 'nature cure and scientific relaxation' courses at Frogmore Hall, Herts.

He was married firstly on 1 March 1917 at Paddington Register Office to Lady Mary Grey, daughter of the 8th Earl and Countess of Stamford, by whom he had two sons. He was divorced by decree nisi 10 April 1930, on his admission of an adulterous relationship of four years' duration with Margaret Ross of East Challacombe, Combe Martin, Devon. He is buried in the Municipal Cemetery, Kirkley, Suffolk.

MEMORY OF LOVE

O DREAD Desire of Love! O lips and eyes!
O image of the love that never dies,
But, fed by furtive fire, rages most
When Hope and Faith have been for ever lost!
O oft-kissed lips and soul-remembered eyes,
O stricken heart -- the old love never dies!

O Passion of dead lips that used to cling
To warm red living ones that breathed no pain!
O Passion of dead hours that daily bring
To life some phantom pale that died in vain! ...
Some echo tuned to Memory's dying strain,
Some witness of the immemorial spring!

— Meredith Starr (The Equinox)
