= Quentin Tod =

- Born: 27 December 1884; Kent, England
- Died: 5 May 1947 (aged 62); Chelsea, London
- Occupations: Actor, dancer

Quentin Tod (27 December 1884 – 5 May 1947), sometimes credited as Quentin Todd, was a British actor, dancer, choreographer, television pioneer, and a devotee of Meher Baba.

== Biography ==
Tod's first credited performance in film was in the 1930 Monty Banks comedy The New Waiter, in which Tod played himself. He was the sole credited dancer in the first British televised version of A Midsummer Night's Dream in 1937 and was ballet choreographer on the 1937 British television pantomime performance of Dick Whittington and His Cat. The following year he devised Have You Brought Your Music? for BBC Television. The show featured music played by the now defunct BBC Television Orchestra.

Quentin Tod met the Indian spiritual master Meher Baba in London at the home of Helena Davy in 1931 and became a devoted follower for the remainder of his life. He spent time in Meher Baba's ashram in India near Ahmednagar and also traveled with him to the United States in 1932.

Tod died in 1947 of malnutrition in St. Stephen's Hospital in Chelsea, London at the age of 62.
