= God in a Pill? =

Book by Meher Baba

- Author: Meher Baba
- Language: English
- Published: 1966 (Sufism Reoriented)
- Publication place: United States
- Media type: Pamphlet

God in a Pill? Meher Baba on L.S.D. and The High Roads was a 1966 pamphlet containing messages from Meher Baba speaking out against taking drugs such as marijuana and LSD, ultimately saying they were harmful "physically, mentally, and spiritually."

The pamphlet was published in 1966 by Sufism Reoriented using quotes by Meher Baba where he disparaged the view that hallucinogenic and psychedelic drugs, especially LSD, but also marijuana, psilocybin, and other drugs, might be used to elicit meaningful spiritual insight. Meher Baba wrote, "If God can be found through the medium of any drug, God is not worthy of being God." It was compiled from letters to several academics in the West including Allan Cohen, Robert Dreyfuss and Richard Alpert.

The pamphlet went out of print, but in 2003 the material was republished in A Mirage Will Never Quench Your Thirst, A Source of Wisdom About Drugs by Laurent Weichberger (Sheriar Foundation, 2003). The new book has material not contained in the original God in A Pill? and a section entitled God in A Pill? Revisited, which reprints those quotes from God in A Pill? which were directly from Meher Baba related to drugs.

== History ==
Meher Baba's name spread throughout the Counterculture of the 1960s, his image appearing in the documentary film Woodstock, on posters and inspiration cards of the era, and on the cover of Rolling Stone. In the mid-1960s Meher Baba became concerned about the rising use of illicit drugs in the West. In correspondence he told several academics, including Richard Alpert, not only to stop using drugs, but to help others to get off drugs. In a November 1970 Rolling Stone article, Pete Townshend, leader of the rock band The Who and a follower of Baba's, discussed Baba's message on drugs, writing:

Baba did emphasize to a young devotee going to see Baba in about 1966, that the biggest single gesture a man could make for youth, would be to spend his life trying to show the dangers of dope. Remember, Baba was concerned with a set of people that felt the psychedelics held the key to religious experience, to Universal consciousness. God in a pill.

== Baba's statements on drugs ==
Meher Baba emphatically told several disciples not only to cease taking hallucinogenic drugs, but also to spread his word that drugs were harmful physically, mentally, and spiritually.

Tell those who indulge in these drugs (LSD, marijuana, and other types) that it is harmful physically, mentally and spiritually, and that they should stop the taking of these drugs. Your duty is to tell them, regardless of whether they accept what you say, or if they ridicule or humiliate you, to boldly and bravely face these things.

In addition Baba made certain statements specifically about LSD, giving a clarification to several American professors through his secretary Adi K. Irani on July 4, 1964.

- Meher Baba did say that the user of LSD could never reach subtle consciousness in this incarnation despite its repeated use, unless the person surrendered to a Perfect Master. To experience real, spiritual consciousness, surrenderance to a Perfect Master is necessary.
- The experiences gained through LSD are, in some cases, experiences of the shadows of the subtle plane in the gross world. These experiences have nothing at all to do with spiritual advancement.
- Baba stresses that repeated use of LSD leads to insanity which may prove incurable in mental cases, even with LSD treatment.
- Medical use of LSD helps to cure, in some cases, mental disorders and madness.
- There is no such thing as “areas in the brain reserved for subtle consciousness,” and the question of LSD affecting them has no meaning.
- When LSD is used for genuine medical purposes, in controlled doses under the supervision of specialists, there are no chances of the brain, liver or kidney being damaged.
- Baba answered again that continued LSD use for non-medical purposes results in madness, and eventually death.
