= Mast (Meher Baba) =

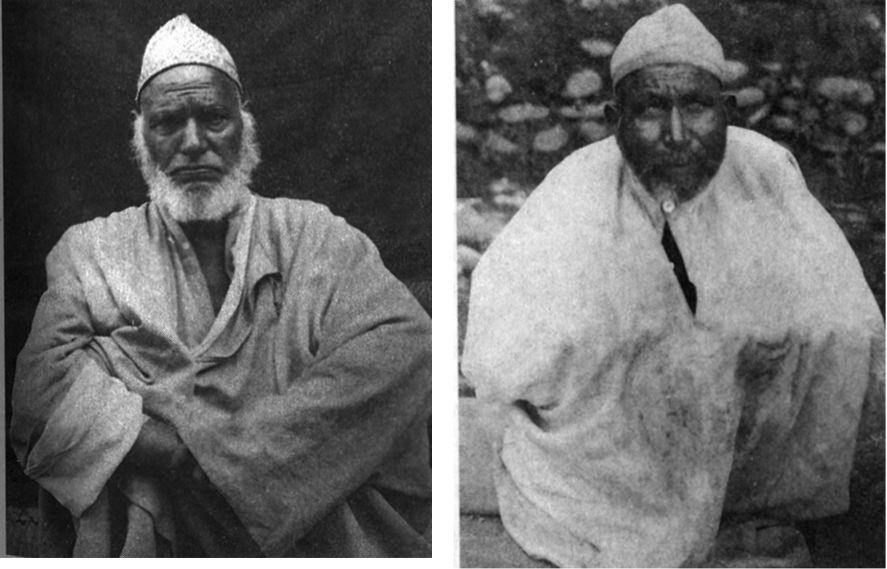
Masts in Kashmir

A mast (from Persian مست mast), in Meher Baba's teaching, is a person who is overwhelmed with love for God, accompanied with external disorientation resembling intoxication. The word was coined by Meher Baba and originates from the Sufi term mast-Allah meaning "intoxicated with God" from Persian mast, literally meaning "intoxicated." Another interpretation of its origin is that it is derived from masti, a Persian word meaning "overpowered."

== Overview ==
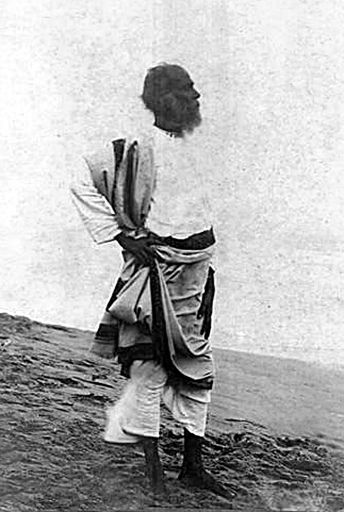
Sadguru and mast Pagal Haranath at Puri Beach

According to Meher Baba, a mast is one who is entranced or spellbound by internal spiritual experiences and ecstasies, who cannot function outwardly in an ordinary way, and may appear mad to a casual outside observer. Such experiences, according to Meher Baba, stem from the station of a mast's consciousness (his or her state of consciousness) on inner planes of involution. In The Wayfarers: Meher Baba With the God-Intoxicated, British medical doctor William Donkin documents at length Meher Baba's contacts with masts throughout South Asia (primarily Iran, India, and Pakistan). The introduction, written by Meher Baba, explains their unique state and their outward characteristics. He carefully distinguishes the mast state from madness and explains that in the case of the mad person, the mind is sped up, while in the case of the mast it is slowed down. Meher Baba made a Sufi analogy (reflecting the poetry of Hafez) to the drunkenness of one intoxicated with wine, but in this case, the wine is the love of God. Meher Baba contacted thousands of masts all over India, Pakistan, and Iran, saying that he was freeing them from enchantment and helping them to continue on the spiritual path and to be of inward service to humanity.

Masts can be in varying degrees of the states of salik or majzoob. Salik means more in touch with outward surroundings, meaning grounded and ordinary. Majzoob refers to that state of being immersed in the inner plane and divorced from the outside world.
