= Meher Spiritual Center =

Religious site in North Myrtle Beach, South Carolina

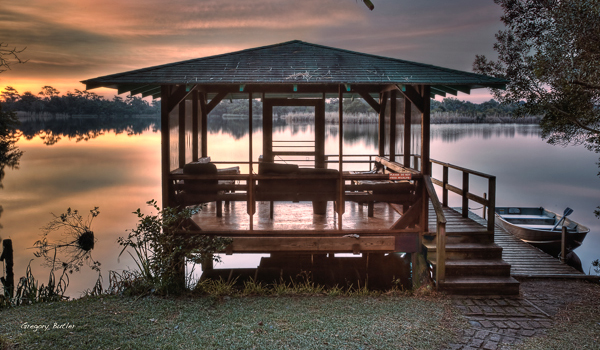
- Founded: 1944
- Type: Religious Pilgrimage
- Location: Myrtle Beach, South Carolina
- Coordinates: 33°47′24″N 78°45′56″W
- Key people: Simeon B. Chapin
- Website: mehercenter.org

Meher Spiritual Center is a universal spiritual retreat and religious site located in North Myrtle Beach, South Carolina. The Center adjacent to Briarcliffe Acres was co-founded by Elizabeth Chapin Patterson and Norina Matchabelli in the early 1940s under the direction of spiritual master Meher Baba.

== History ==
Elizabeth Patterson and Norina Matchabelli originally sought land in other parts of the United States including California. But no land met all the requirements stated by Meher Baba such as equitable climate, virgin soil, ample water, soil that could be made self-sustaining to a large number of people, and the property should be given from the heart. Eventually Elizabeth Patterson's father, Simeon B. Chapin, who was one of the original developers of Myrtle Beach, gave her the land as a gift. He felt that it was not suitable for his resort plans since its lakes obstructed access to the beach.

== The Center ==
The Meher Spiritual Center is 500-acre (200 ha) designated wildlife sanctuary, with more than 200 species of plants, 100 species of birds and 44 species of animals. The Center has two lakes, many nature trails, and a mile of Atlantic shoreline. The Center has a house built for Meher Baba which is named "Meher Abode" but usually referred to as "Baba's House." Meher Baba stayed there during his three visits to America in the 1950s. Meher Baba inaugurated the Meher Center in 1952 and also visited in 1956 and 1958.

== Gallery ==
Main Sites at the sanctuary

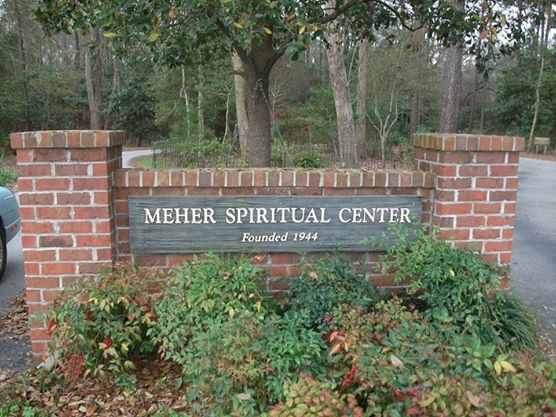
Center Entrance

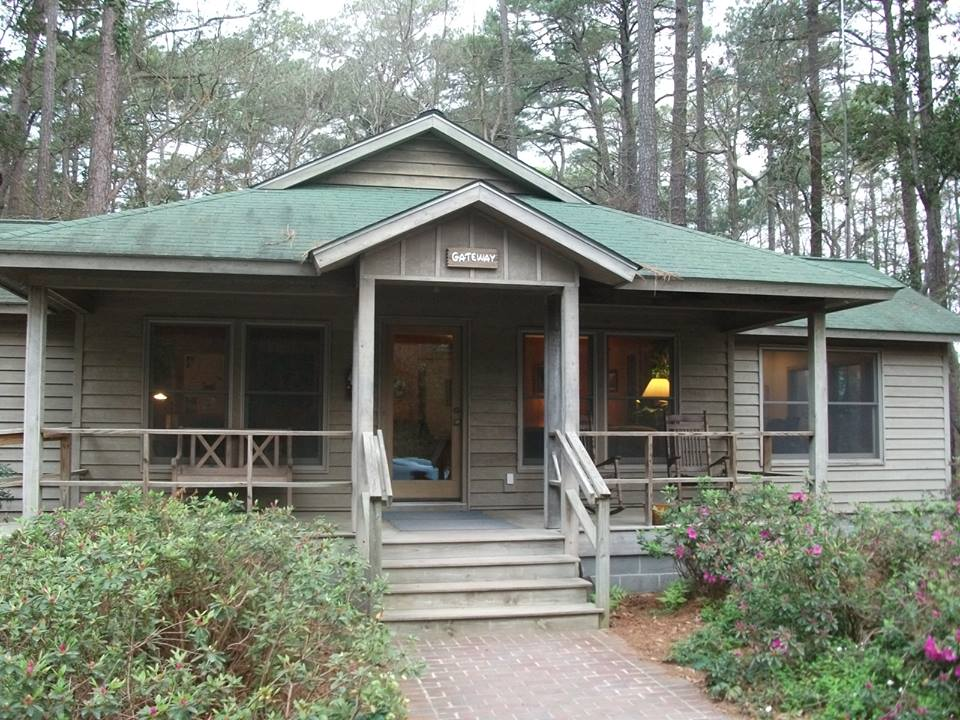
Gateway

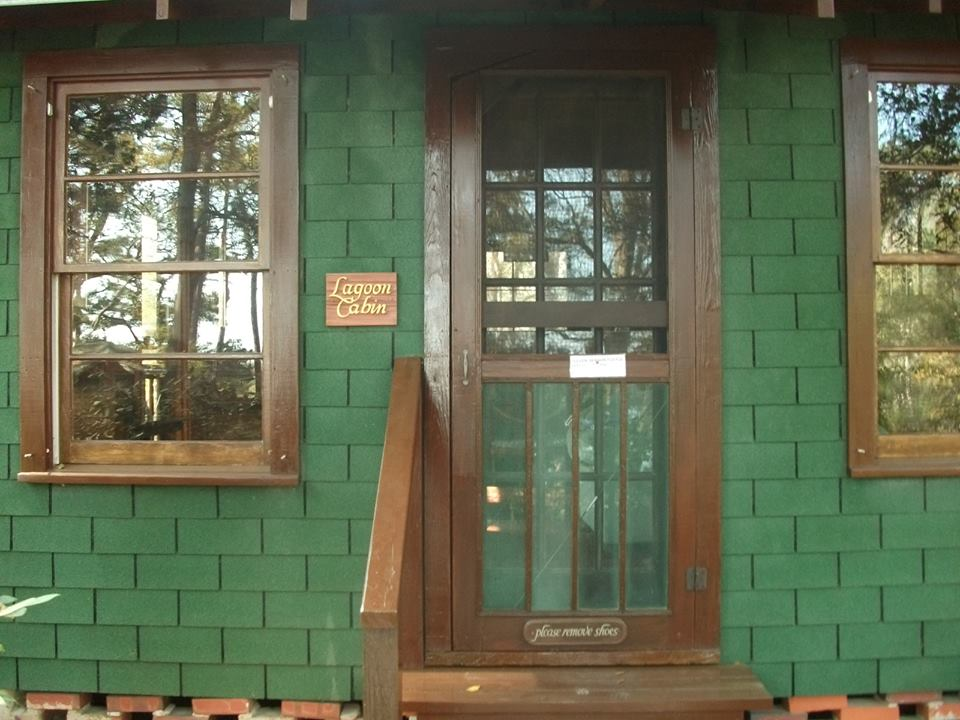
Lagoon Cabin front

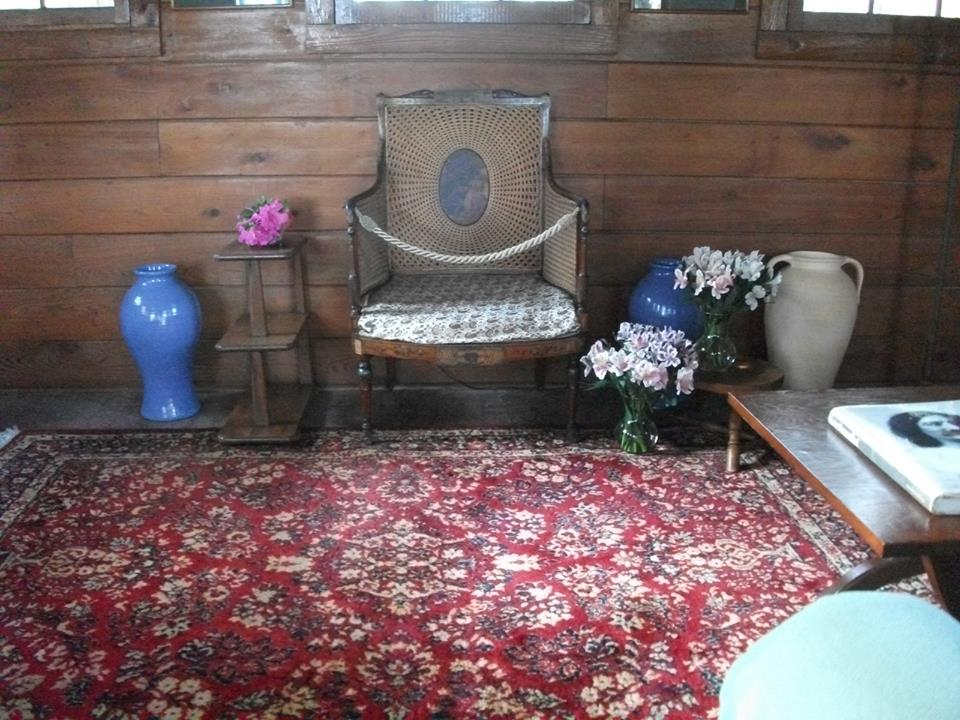
Lagoon Cabin interior

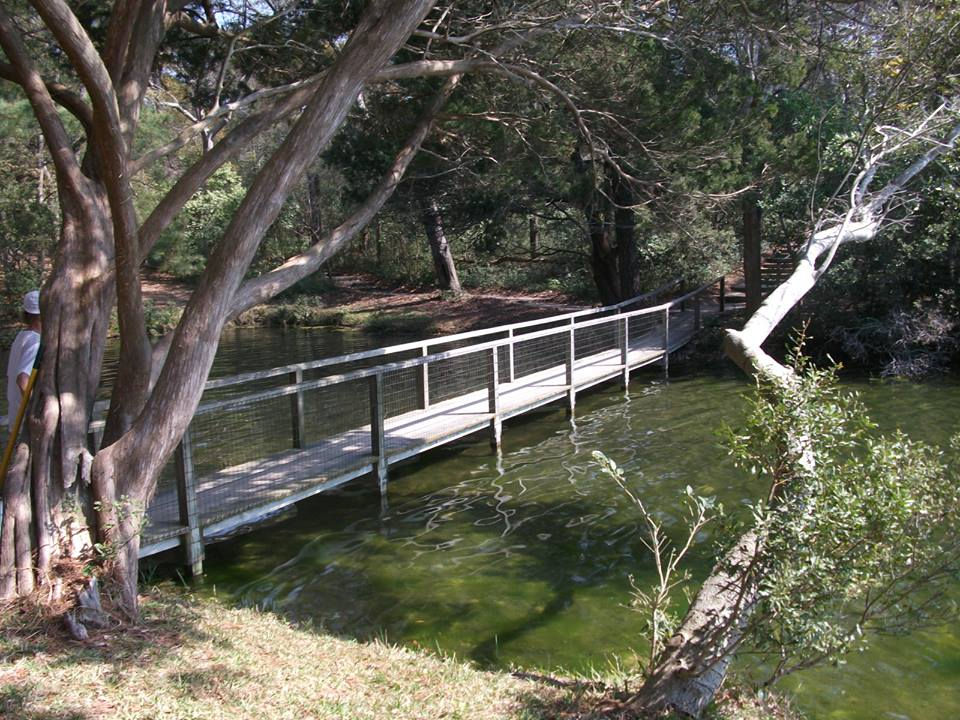
Walk Bridge

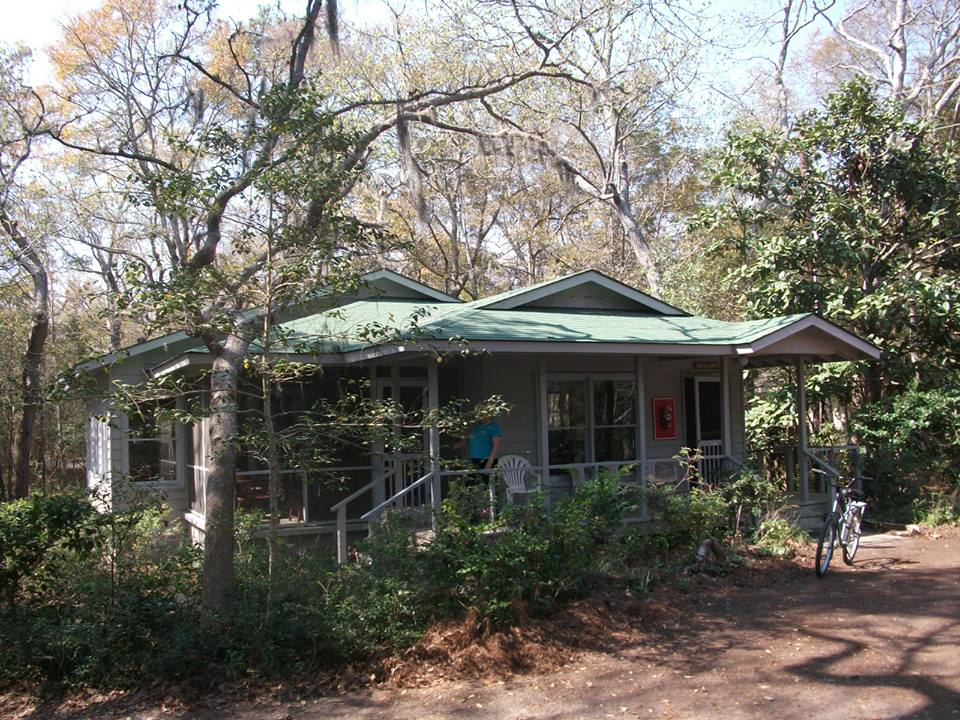
Refectory

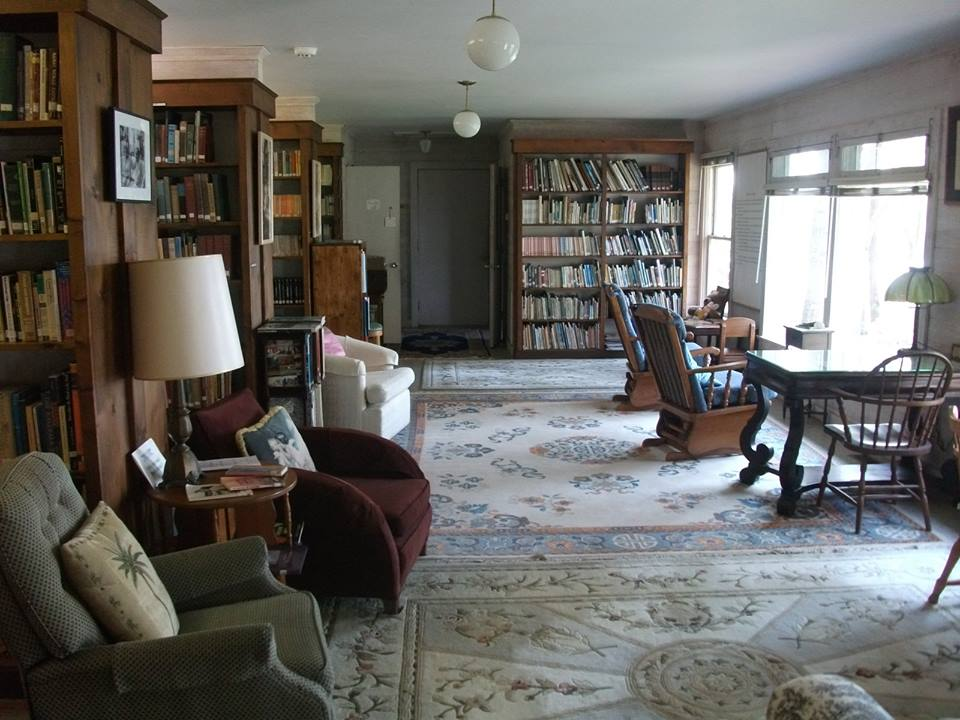
Saroja Library

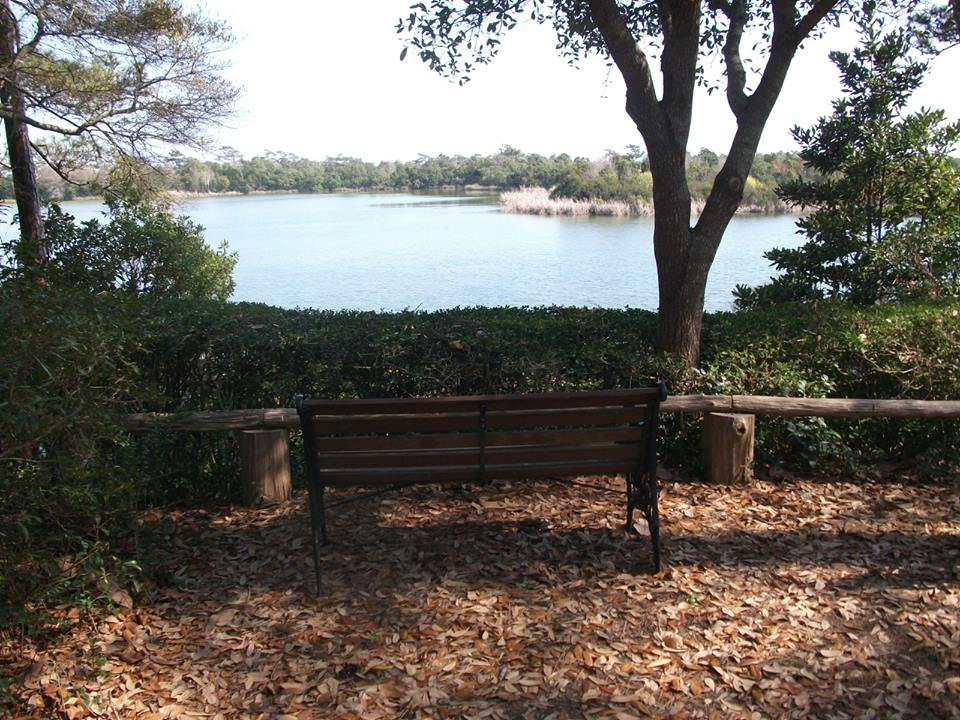
Lake view

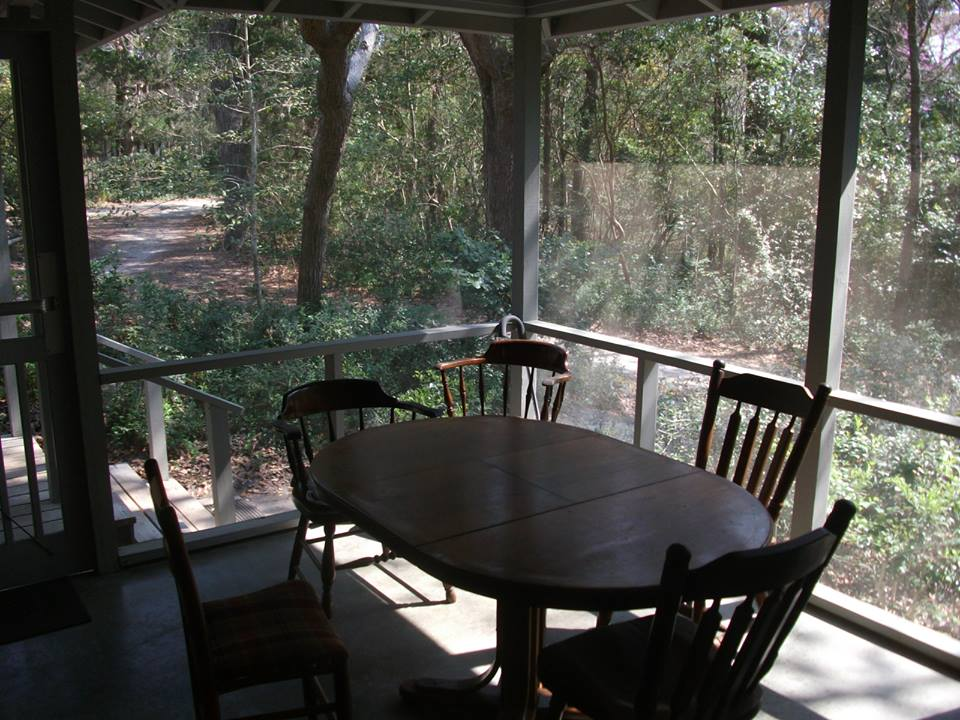
Retreat

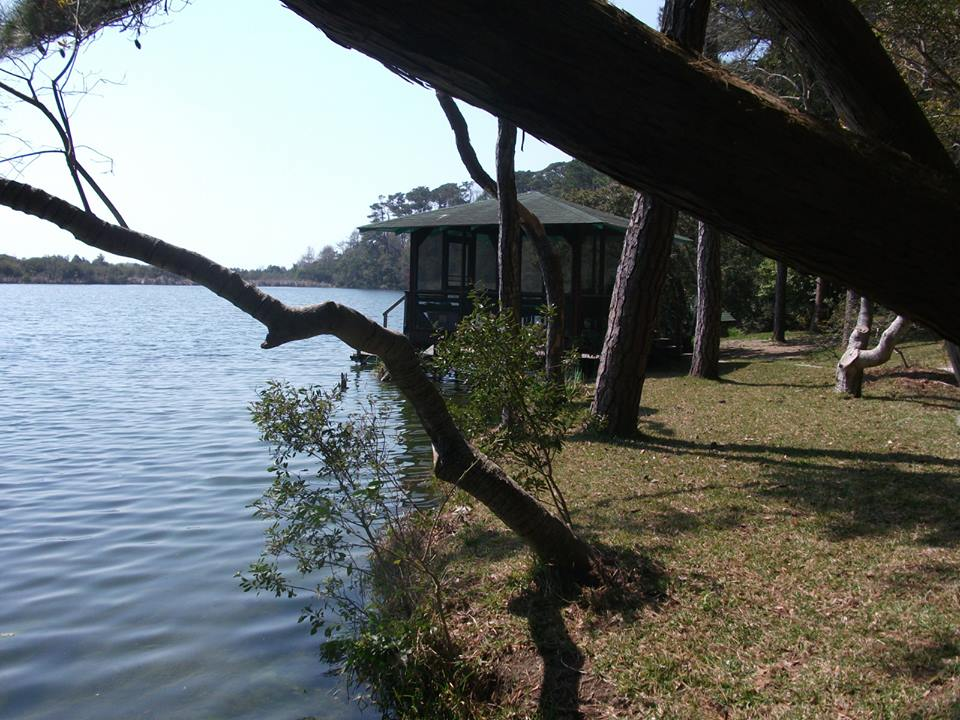
Boat House
