= Charles Purdom =

British author, drama critic, town planner and economist

- C. B. Purdom
- Born: 15 October 1883; Southwark, London, England
- Died: 8 July 1965 (aged 81); Welwyn Garden City, England
- Occupations: Writer, economist
- Spouse: Lilian Antonia Purdom
- Children: Ronan H. Purdom; Philip C. Purdom; Barbara M. Purdom; Edmund C. Purdom

Charles Benjamin Purdom (15 October 1883 – 8 July 1965) was a British author, drama critic, town planner, and economist. He was one of the pioneers and founders of the first garden cities, Letchworth and Welwyn Garden City, the latter of which he was appointed Finance Director between 1919–1928. He was then made Honorary Secretary, then Treasurer of the International Federation for Housing and Planning (1931–1935). He was also founder of the Letchworth and Welwyn Garden City Theatre Society, now the Welwyn Drama Club. He won the Howard Walden cup at the Welwyn Garden City Drama Festival and the David Belasco cup in New-York in 1927. He was an author of many books on city development, on Shakespeare and Bernard Shaw plays, Harley Granville-Barker, and on producing plays. He was editor of an English literary periodical called Everyman, covering books, drama, music and travel and featured articles by renowned authors such as Ivor Brown, Arthur Machen, G. K. Chesterton, A. E. Coppard, and Bertrand Russell. He was General Secretary of British Equity (1939–1940) and joint secretary of the London Theatre Council. He was also the earliest biographer of Meher Baba. He was father of the actor Edmund Purdom. He died in Welwyn Garden City in 1965.

== First biographer of Meher Baba ==
Purdom was a devoted follower of the Indian silent teacher Meher Baba after meeting him in Devon, England on Baba's first visit to the West in 1931. Purdom was Meher Baba's original biographer, writing The Perfect Master: The Early Life of Meher Baba in 1937, which covers Meher Baba's life from 1911–1936, and The God Man: The Life, Journeys & Work of Meher Baba with an Interpretation of His Silence & Spiritual Teaching in 1964. He also wrote an early single-volume edition of Meher Baba's discourses titled God to Man and Man to God: The Discourses of Meher Baba (1955) and with author Malcolm Schloss co-wrote a detailed account of a group visit with Meher Baba in India titled Three Incredible Weeks with Meher Baba.

== Selected publications ==
- The Garden City: A Study of the Development of a Modern Town, J.M. Dent & Sons, London, 1913
- The Building of Satellite Towns: A Contribution to the Study of Town Development and Regional Planning, J.M. Dent & Sons, London, 1925
- The Swan Shakespeare; a Player's Edition – 3 Volumes , J.M. Dent & Sons, London, 1930
- Producing Plays: a handbook for producers & players, J.M. Dent, London 1930
- Everyman at War. Sixty Personal Narratives of the War, (Selected from Everyman Magazine), Dutton, New York, 1930 and J.M. Dent, London, 1939
- The Perfect Master: The Life of Shri Meher Baba, (Meher Baba's life from 1911–1936), Williams & Norgate Ltd, London, 1937. Reprinted as Perfect Master, The Early Life of Meher Baba, by Sheriar Press USA in 1976
- The New Order, J.M. Dent and Sons Ltd, 1941
- How Shall We Rebuild London?, J.M. Dent, London, 1946
- Economic Wellbeing, Nicholson and Watson, 1947
- Producing Shakespeare, Sir Isaac Pitman & Sons, London, 1950
- Life Over Again (Autobiography), J.M. Dent & Sons Ltd., London, 1951
- Drama Festivals and Their Adjudication; a Handbook for Producers, Actors, Festival Organisers, and Adjudicators, J.M. Dent and Sons Ltd., London, 1951
- Harley Granville Barker: Man of the Theatre, Dramatist, and Scholar, Salisbury Square, 1955
- God to Man and Man to God: The Discourses of Meher Baba, Victor Gollancz Ltd., London, 1955
- Bernard Shaw's Letters to Granville Barker, Phoenix House, London, 1956
- A Guide to the Plays of Bernard Shaw, Methuen & Co. Ltd, London, 1963
- The Letchworth Achievement, J.M. Dent & Sons, 1963
- What Happens in Shakespeare: a New Interpretation, John Baker Publ., London, 1963
- The God-Man: The Life, Journeys & Work of Meher Baba with an Interpretation of His Silence & Spiritual Teaching, George Allen & Unwin, London, 1964
- Three Incredible Weeks with Meher Baba: 11–30 September 1954, Sheriar Press, Myrtle Beach, 1979

Trade union offices
Preceded by Geoffrey Robinson	General Secretary of Equity; 1939–1940	Succeeded by Llewellyn Rees
