= Meherabad =

Village in Maharashtra

- Pilgrimage Site
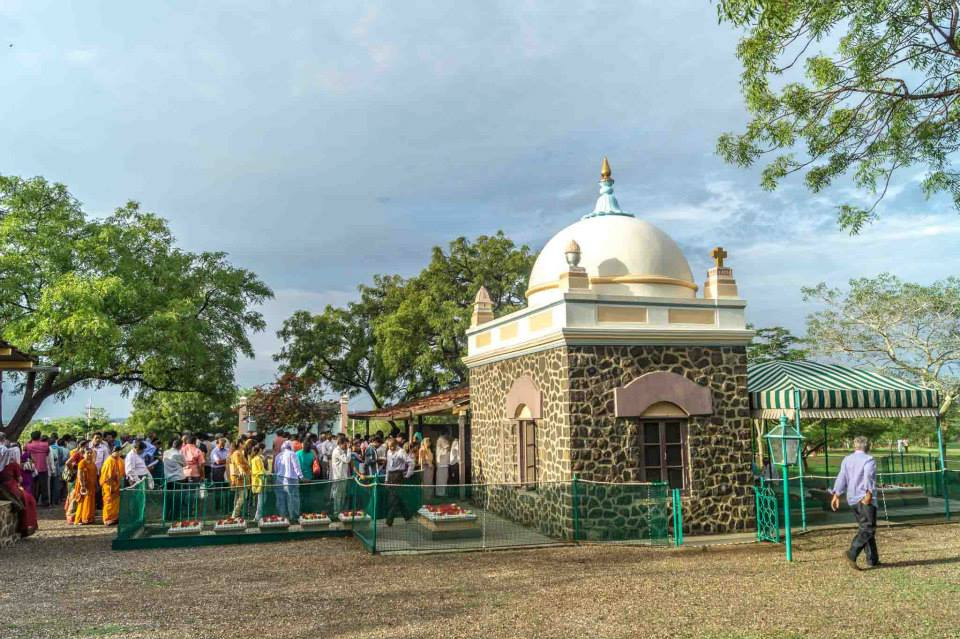
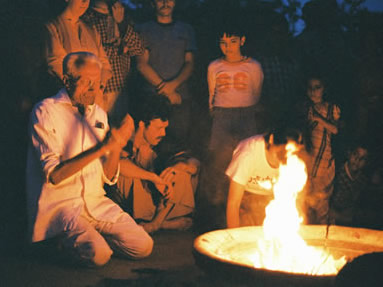
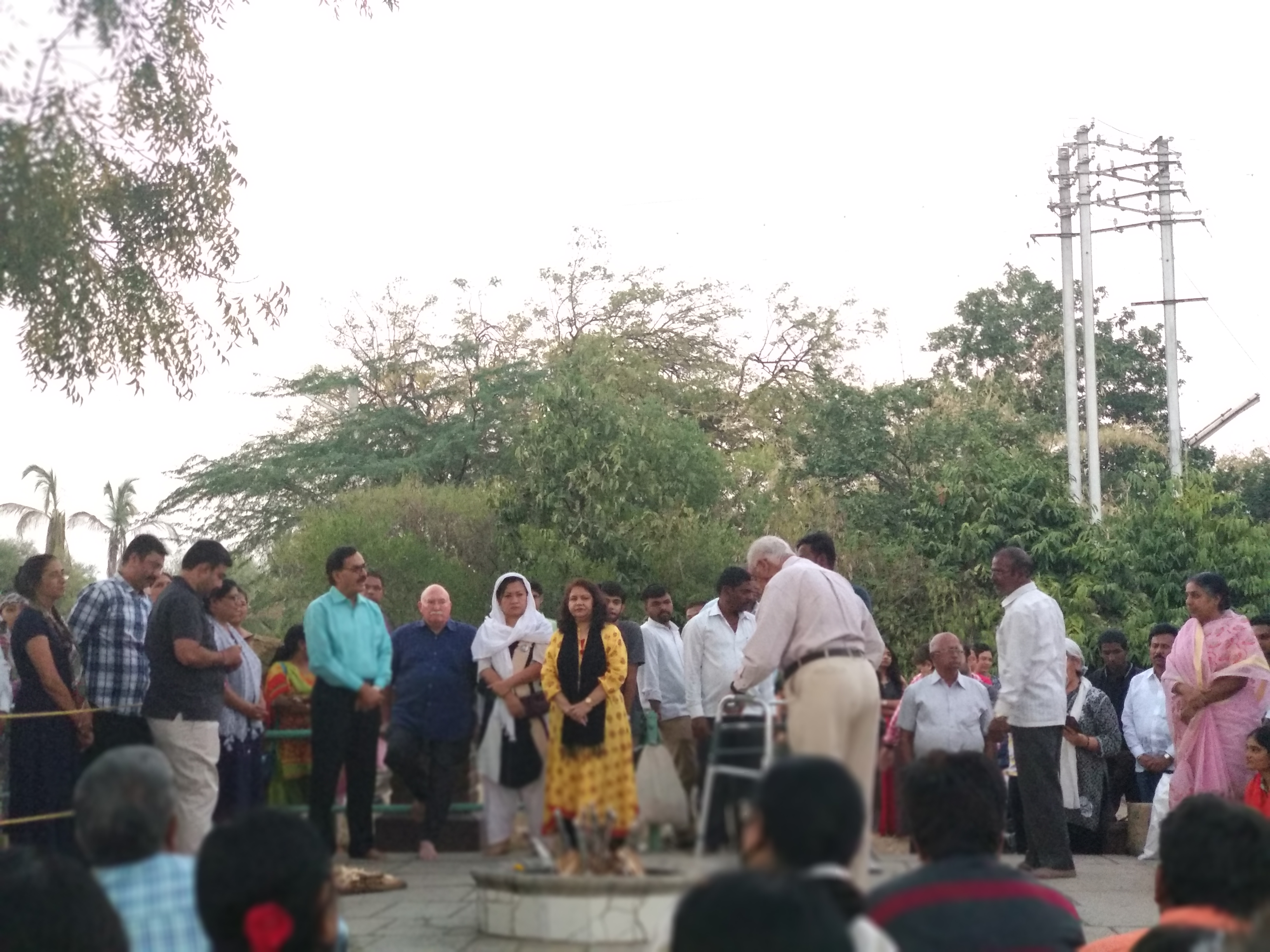
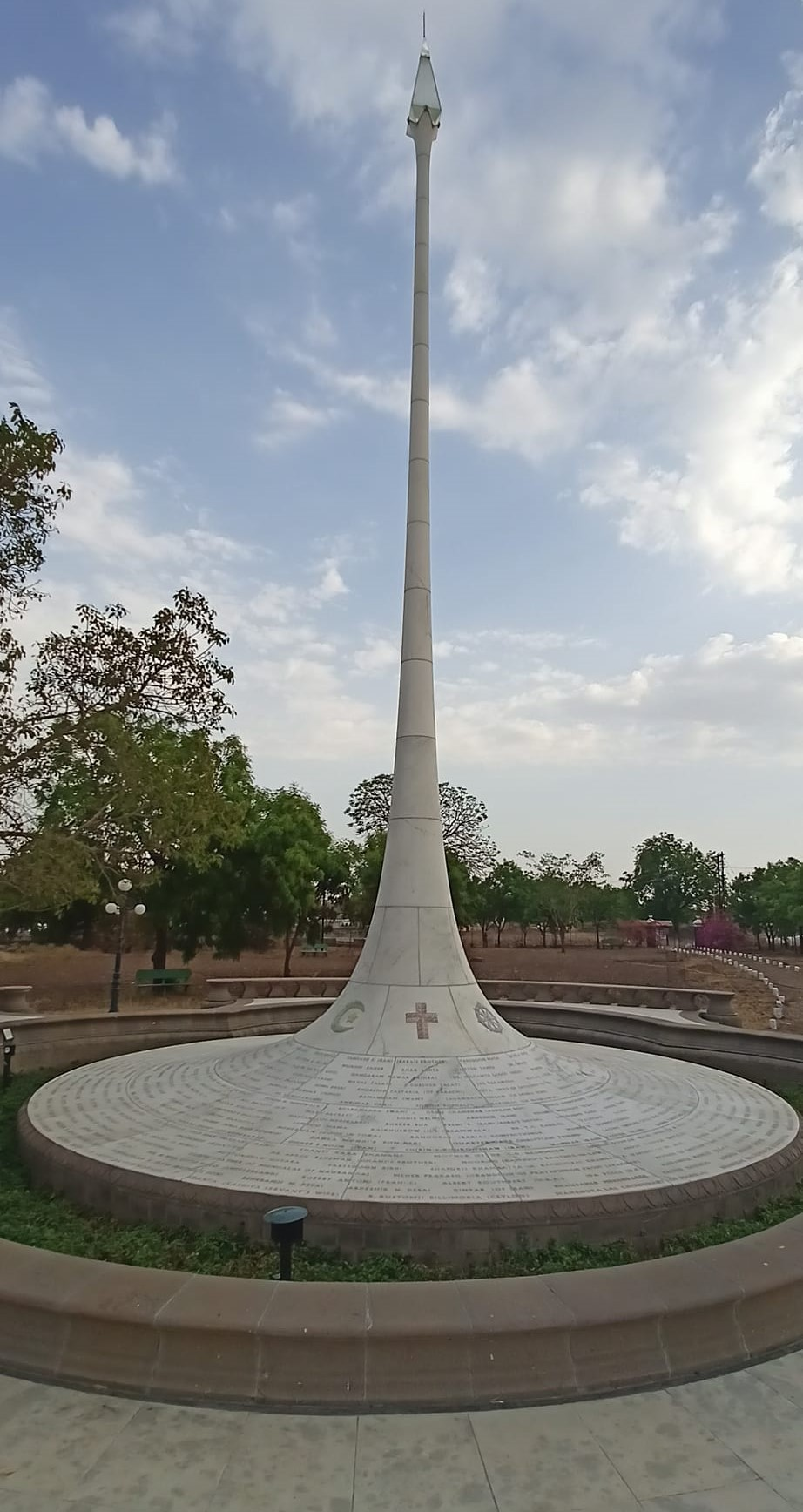
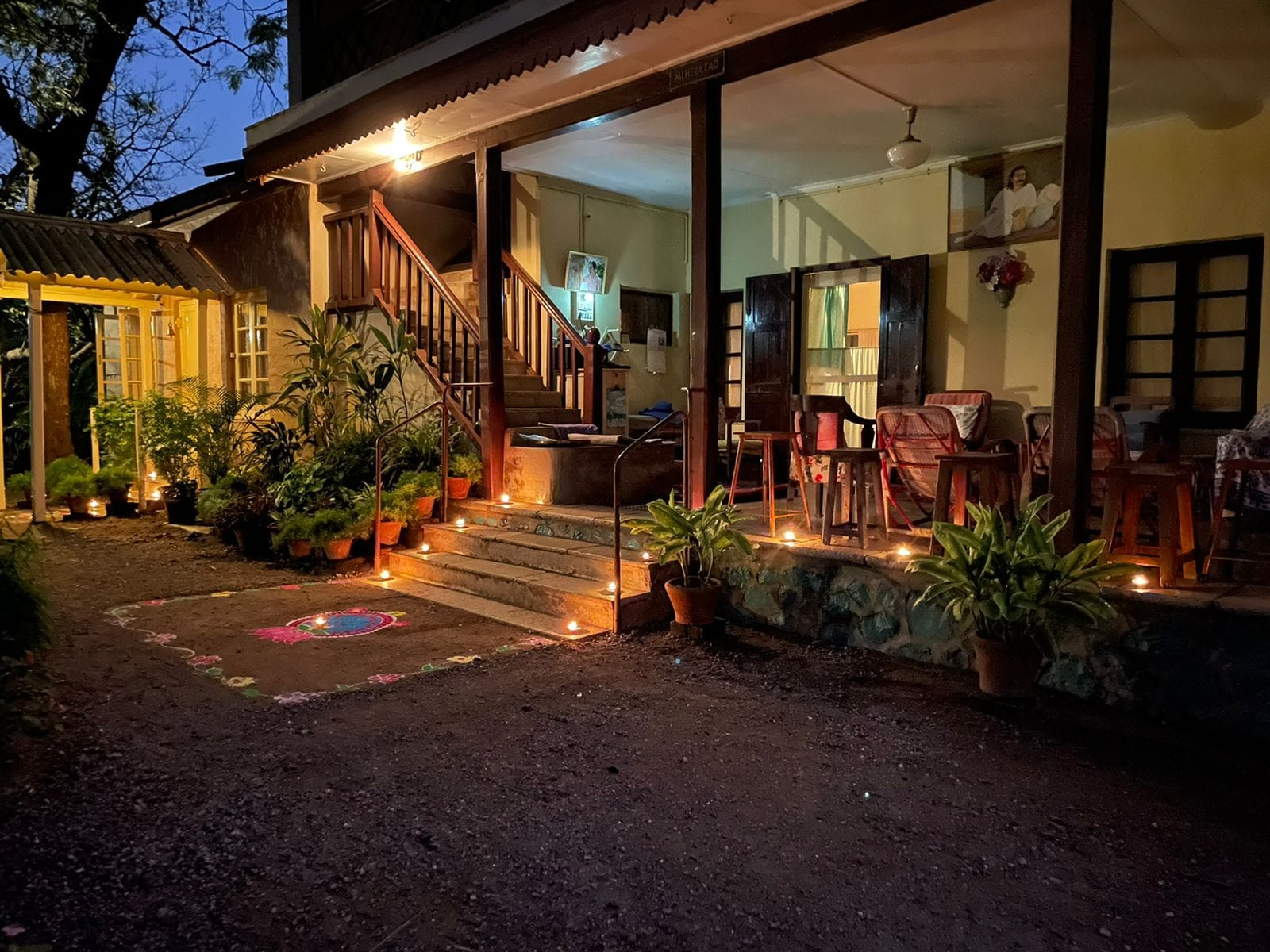
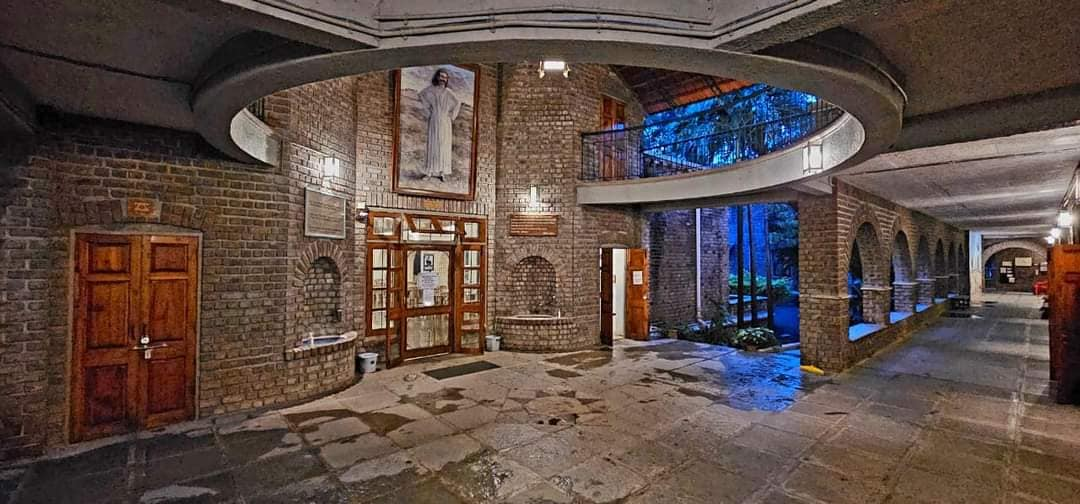
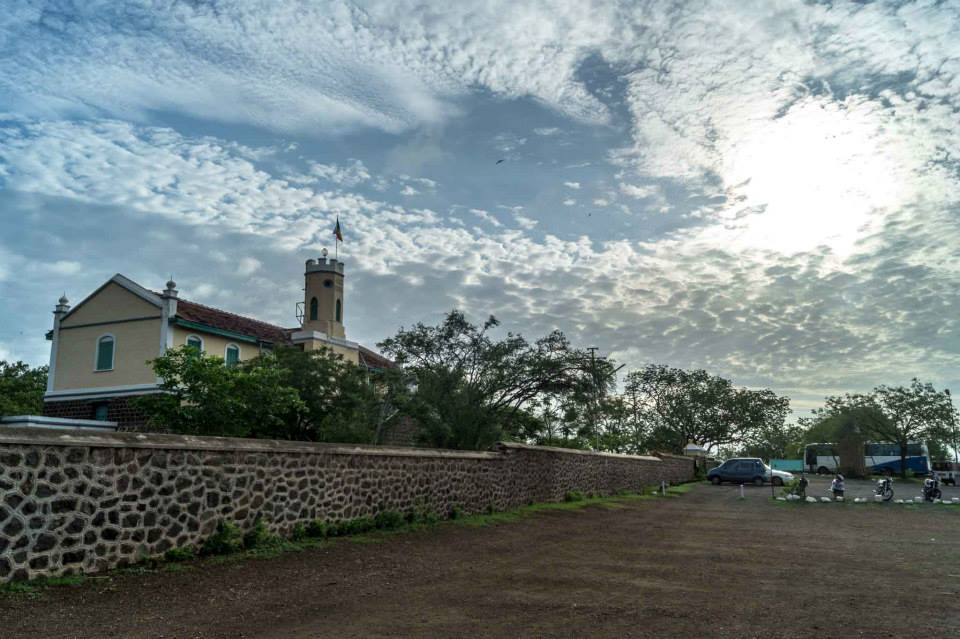
- Meher Baba's Samadhi Mandir and Sanctum Sanctorum at upper Meherabad Dhuni worship at lower Meherabad Dhuni site at lower Meherabad Memorial Tower at lower Meherabad Mandali House at Meherazad Meher Pilgrim Retreat Museum at upper Meherabad

- Location within Maharashtra Location within India
- Coordinates: 19.029539°N 74.719042°E
- Country: India
- State: Maharashtra
- District: Ahmednagar
- Elevation: 672 m (2,205 ft)
- Time zone: UTC+5:30 (IST)
- PIN: 414001
- Website: ambppct.org

Meherabad is a universal spiritual retreat in Arangaon village about 9 kilometres (6 mi), south of Ahmednagar, Maharashtra, India. It is home to Indian Spiritual Master Meher Baba's Samadhi Mandir. Meherabad was originally established as an ashram by Meher Baba in 1923.

Amartithi is celebrated in Meherabad every year on 31 January commemorating entombment of Meher Baba's physical form on 31 January 1969. The word "Amartithi" was coined by Meher Baba's Mandali and means "deathless day" (Literally, amar, deathless; tithi, day). Also translated as "eternal date" or "date with the Eternal." Around 10,000-20,000 overnight and 30,000-40,000 daytime visitors from all over the world gather at Meherabad for the three-day program.

Amartithi is celebrated by Meher Baba's followers all over the world, including in the United States, Europe, and Australia, and, besides "Silence Day" (10 July, commemorating the commencement of Meher Baba's lifelong silence), "Christmas Day" (25 December), and "Meher Baba's Birthday" (25 February), it is considered among the most significant holidays among followers of Meher Baba.

At Meherabad the climax of the event takes place on Amartithi day itself when the assembled crowd keeps silence for fifteen minutes in honor of the physical passing of Meher Baba at 12:15 p.m. on 31 January 1969. Meher Baba's flag is flown over Meherabad during Amartithi.

== Honoring the sacred Dhuni ==
On the 12th day of every month, the sacred Dhuni fire is worshiped at the dhuni site in lower Meherabad.

== Memorial Tower ==
The foundation stone of the memorial tower was laid by Meher Baba on 23 December 1944. In December 2019, the memorial tower designed by resident architect Ted Judson was inaugurated on the land consecrated by Meher Baba at lower Meherabad. The Tower has name inscriptions of Departed Meher Baba lovers specially designated by Meher Baba.

== Pilgrim Retreats ==
Meherabad is home to Meher Pilgrim Center, Meher Pilgrim Retreat, Hostels (A-B-C-D), Dharmshala, and Andhra Rest House serving as housing facilities to pilgrims. The Pilgrim Center and Pilgrim Retreat are closed during the hot Indian summer from 15 March to 15 June of each year. The Meher Pilgrim Retreat is a 88,000-square-foot (8,200 m^{2}) housing facility inaguarted on 15 June 2006.

== Gilori Shah's Tomb ==
Gilori Shah had his final resting place in Meherabad when Meher Baba established his Ashram.

== Lower Meherabad Sites ==
- Gilori Shah's tomb
- Dhuni Site
- Neem Tree and Original Well
- Upasni Serai Site
- Men Mandali's tombs
- Meher Baba's Table-House
- Meher Baba's Jhopdi
- Dr. Donkin's Quarters
- Mandali Halls, Meher Pilgrim Center, Hostels (A-B-C-D), Dharmshala, and Andhra Rest House

== Upper Meherabad Sites ==
- Meher Baba's Samadhi Mandir
- Woman Mandali's tombs
- Museums
- Amphitheaters
- New Site
- Meher Pilgrim Retreat

== AMBPPCT ==
In 1959, Meher Baba established the "Avatar Meher Baba Perpetual Public Charitable Trust" a registered Public Charitable Trust in India to fulfil the objectives laid down in the Trust Deed given by Meher Baba. The Trust is responsible for various activities at Meherabad, including preserving and disseminating Meher Baba’s universal teachings and message of love, compassion, and oneness. On 17 June 1967, Meher Baba executed His Last Will and Testament, in which He bequeathed His property, tangible and intangible. In February 2021 the Board of Trustees approved a Master Plan for the Trust that encompasses the future development of Meherabad, Meherazad, and Meher Nazar. Framroze Mistry is the current Trust Chairman. The AMBPPC trust is located south of Meherabad at King's Road, Post Bag 31, Ahmednagar, Maharashtra, India.

== Medical Facilities ==
The AMBPPCT provides free Medical Care to nearby communities and villages.

- Meher Health Centre - Primary AMBPPCT public health center opened in 1975 at the "Family Quarters" grounds Ahmednagar
- Meher Pilgrim Retreat Dispensary - Outpatient clinic ministers to the medical needs of Meherabad pilgrims
- The Meher Hospital - Hosts a daily consultation for Trust employees and their families
- Meher Free Dispensary (Homeopathy)

== Educational Programmes ==
- Meher English School
- Physical Education Centre
- Spiritual Academy

== Meher Darbar ==
Meher Darbar is located at MS SH 10 near PRO office is a one stop destination in Meherabad for religious products, and internet cafe to pilgrims. It is owned by resident Baba lover Pushkar Jangale. Meher Darbar is a micro enterprise engaged in the retail sale of Meher Baba's literature, magazines, photographs, decorative items and clothing accessories.

== Meherazad ==
Meherazad was originally Meher Baba Mandali's House established by Meher Baba at Pimpalgaon Malvi, Shendi, south of Ahmednagar. Meherazad gardens and seclusion hill are open to visitors on Tuesdays, Thursdays, and Sundays from 11:00 am to 12:30 pm. A shuttle bus service for pilgrims is available from the Meher Pilgrim Retreat in Meherabad to Meherazad.

== Gallery ==
Meherabad

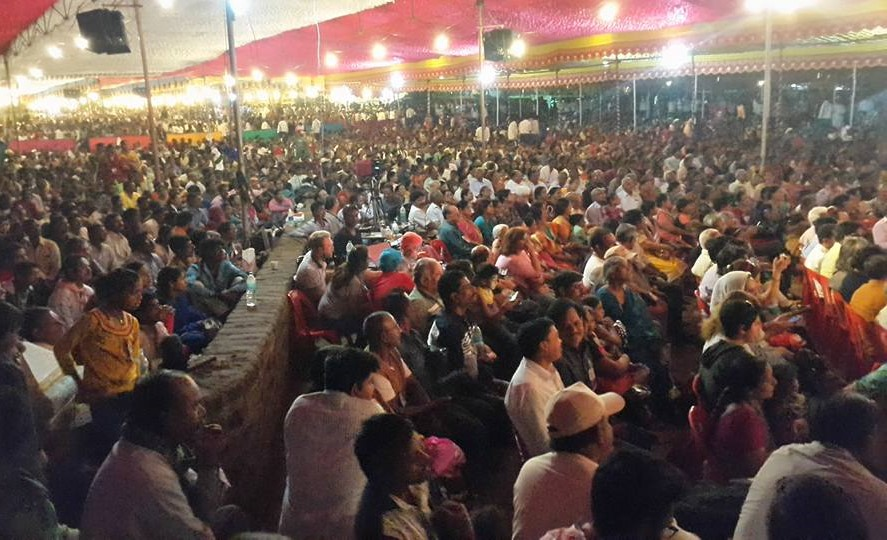
Pilgrims during Amartithi

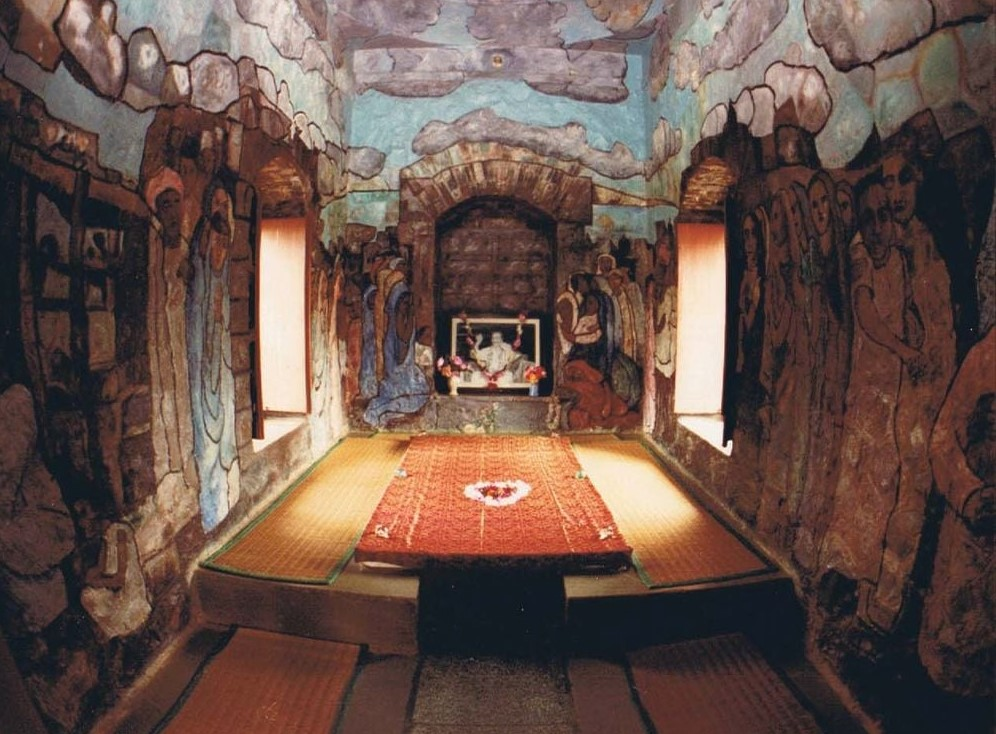
Meher Baba's Tomb inside view

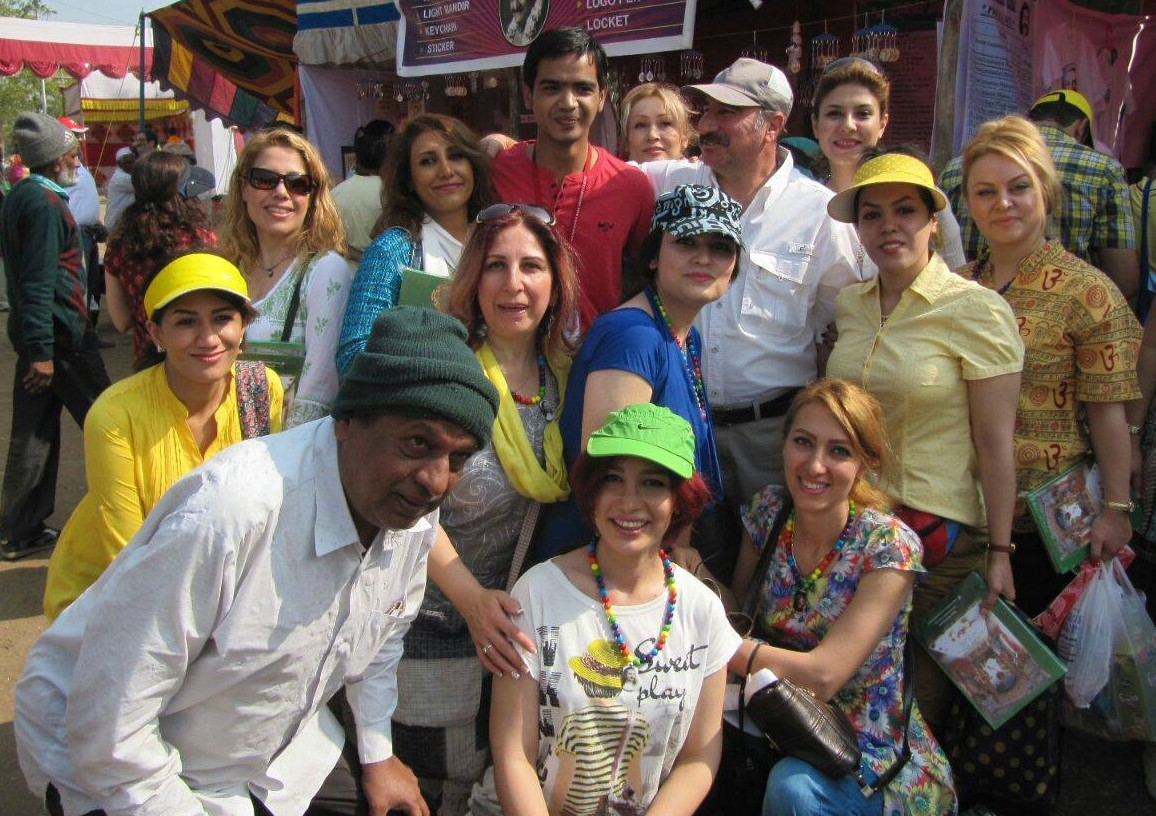
Pilgrims at Amartithi

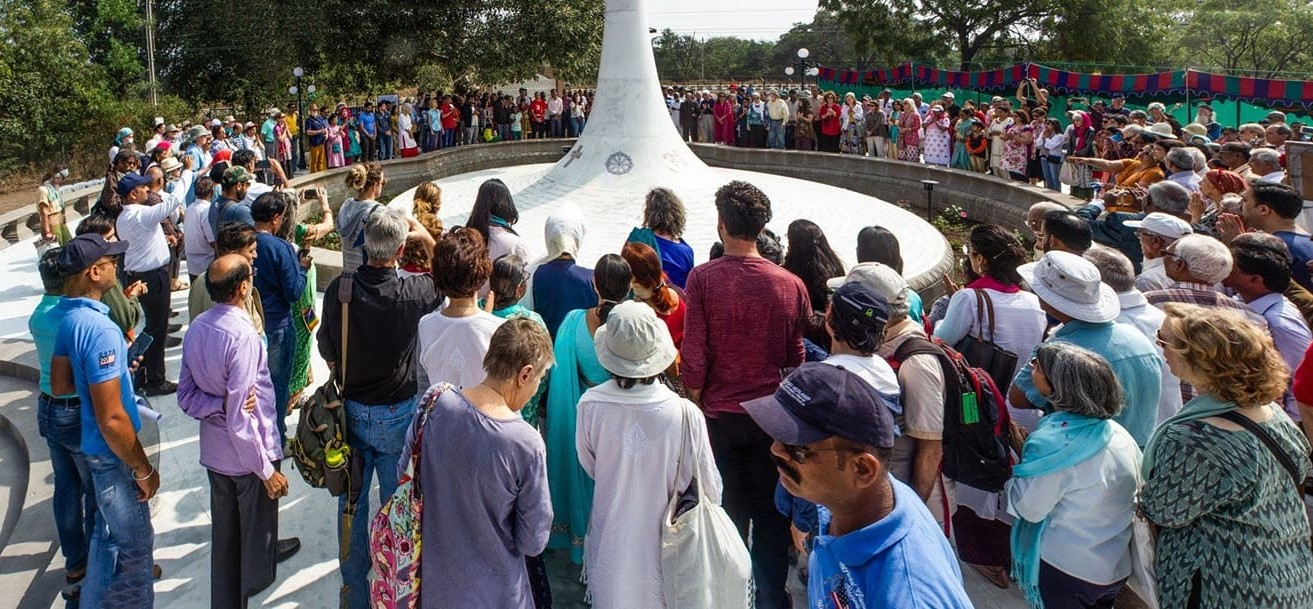
Pilgrims at Memorial Tower
