= Mandali (Meher Baba) =

Mandali from the Sanskrit mandala meaning circle, connection, community, is a term that Meher Baba used for his closest disciples.

== Inner circle ==
Mandali are considered to include those close disciples that lived permanently or for extended periods with Meher Baba at his ashrams. However, not all of Meher Baba's mandali lived with him. According to Meher Baba the Avatar always has 10 concentric circles of 12 men and/or women each. The inner circle consists of 12 men plus two women, for a total of 122 mandali. But Meher Baba also said, "Those who do my work are my mandali. If we were to list their names, it would fill a volume." At another time Baba said, "By mandali I mean those who have been with me for several years, but ask for nothing... In short, I would say that the mandali means those whose intimacy I feel."

== See also ==
- New Life (Meher Baba)
