= Simeon B. Chapin =

- Simeon B. Chapin
- Born: Simeon Brooks Chapin; May 31, 1865; Milwaukee, Wisconsin
- Died: January 6, 1945 (aged 79); Pinehurst, North Carolina
- Occupations: Financier, Philanthropist
- Known for: Developer of Myrtle Beach
- Spouse: Elizabeth Mattocks (m. 1892)
- Children: 4
- Parents: Emory David Chapin (father); Marietta Armour Chapin (mother)

Simeon Brooks Chapin (May 31, 1865 – January 6, 1945) was a financier, philanthropist, and one of the early developers of Myrtle Beach, South Carolina.

== Biography ==
Chapin was born in Milwaukee, Wisconsin, the son of Emory David and Marietta Armour Chapin. In 1878, he attended Harvard School for Boys in Chicago. In 1883, he began work at Armour and Company in Chicago. In 1892, he began his own business as a banker and broker in Chicago and in the same year married Elizabeth Mattocks. In 1901, he formed S. B. Chapin Company with offices in both Chicago and Wall Street. In 1906, he and his family moved to Manhattan, where they took up permanent residence on 5th Ave., in one of three private residences where 930 Fifth Avenue is located today.

In 1912, he joined Burroughs and Collins Company to form Burroughs & Chapin, which developed much of Myrtle Beach, South Carolina. Chapin retired in 1941, after which he formed several philanthropic foundations, including Chapin Foundation of Myrtle Beach, which by 2005 had contributed $15 million to churches, institutions, and hospitals in the city. He also founded the Chapin-May Foundation in Chicago, Chapin Foundation in Lake Geneva, Wisconsin, and Chapin Foundation of North Carolina in Pinehurst and Sanford.

He died in Pinehurst in 1945.

== Private life ==
The Chapins had four children, Marietta, Elizabeth, Simeon Jr., and Virginia.
