= Meher Baba =

Indian spiritual master (1894–1969)

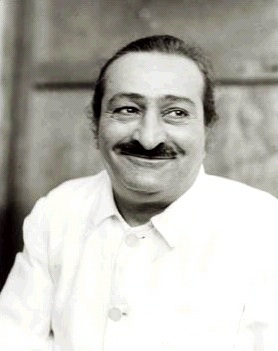
- Meher Baba in 1945
- Born: Merwan Sheriar Irani; 25 February 1894; Pune, Bombay Presidency, British India
- Died: 31 January 1969 (aged 74); Meherabad, Ahmednagar, Maharashtra, India
- Other name: The Awakener

Philosophical work
- Main interests: Religion; metaphysics; aesthetics; ethics
- Notable works: God Speaks; Discourses
- Website: avatarmeherbabatrust.org

Signature
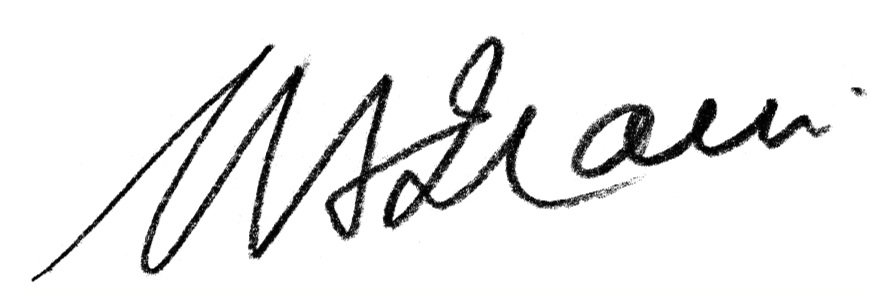

Meher Baba (/ˈmeɪər ˈbɑːbə/ or /mɛˈhɛr bɑːˈbɑː/; born Merwan Sheriar Irani; 25 February 1894 – 31 January 1969) was an Indian spiritual leader who said he was the Avatar, the reincarnation of Muhammad, Buddha, Jesus, Krishna, Rama and Zoroaster, or the total manifestation of God in human form. A spiritual figure of the 20th century, he had a following of hundreds of thousands of people, mostly in India, with a smaller number of followers in North America, Europe, South America, and Australia.

Meher Baba's map of consciousness has been described as "a unique amalgam of Sufi, Vedic, and Yogic terminology". He taught that the goal of all beings was to become conscious of their own divinity, and to realise the oneness of God.

At the age of 19, Meher Baba began a seven-year period of spiritual transformation, during which he had encounters with Hazrat Babajan, Upasni Maharaj, Sai Baba of Shirdi, Tajuddin Baba, and Narayan Maharaj. In 1925, he began a 44-year period of silence, during which he communicated first using an alphabet board and by 1954 entirely through hand gestures using an interpreter. Meher Baba died on 31 January 1969 and was entombed at Meherabad. His tomb, or "samadhi", has become a place of pilgrimage for his followers, often known as "Baba lovers".

== Overview of teachings ==
Meher Baba's teachings concerned the nature and purpose of life. He described the phenomenal world as illusory, and taught that the universe is imagination. He taught that God alone exists, and each soul is God passing through imagination in order to realise its own divinity. He advised followers wishing to attain God-realisation, emphasizing love and selfless-service. His other teachings included discussion of Perfect Masters, the Avatar, spiritual aspirants, and the various stages of the spiritual path, which he termed involution. God Speaks and Discourses are regarded as among his most important written works.

For decades he declined to speak and later refrained from communicating via written language. This practice has remained a topic of discussion among some of his followers.

== Wider influence ==
His legacy includes the Avatar Meher Baba Charitable Trust he established in India, and a handful of centers for information and pilgrimage. He has influenced pop culture creators and introduced the slogan "Don't worry; be happy". This was used in Bobby McFerrin's hit 1988 song of the same name. Among his followers were well-known musicians such as Melanie Safka and Pete Townshend, as well as journalists including Sir Tom Hopkinson.

In 1971, Meher Baba's following in the United States was estimated at 7,000 people. Some commentators have suggested that the size of the movement has been underestimated due to the rarity of proselytising by Meher Baba's followers, and that in 1975, the movement was larger than the more visible Hare Krishna movement.

Meher Baba was accepted as the leader of a Sufi organization based in California which he renamed Sufism Reoriented. Meher Baba's Sufi influence is said to have drawn from Sai Baba of Shirdi, whom Meher Baba designated as a Qutb. However, some commentators have asserted that Meher Baba's interpretation of Sufism shared very few similarities with the Sufi Movement apart from universalism and anti-dogmatism.

== Life and works ==
=== Early life ===
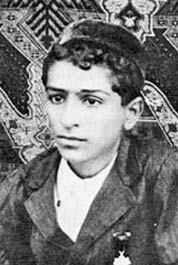
Meher Baba (as Merwan Irani) at 16 years old in 1910

Meher Baba was born to Irani Zoroastrian parents in 1894 in Pune, India (formerly Poona). He was named Merwan Sheriar Irani, the second son of Sheriar Irani and Shireen Irani. Sheriar Irani was a Persian Zoroastrian from Khorramshahr who had spent years wandering in search of spiritual experiences before settling in Pune.

As a boy, Baba formed the Cosmopolitan Club, which was dedicated to remaining informed on world affairs and donating money to charity. He was a multi-instrumentalist and poet. Fluent in several languages, he enjoyed the works of Hafez, William Shakespeare, and Percy Bysshe Shelley.

His spiritual transformation began when he was 19 years old and lasted for seven years. At 19, he met Hazrat Babajan, an elderly Muslim saint. He was cycling past a tree that she had made her abode, when she called to him. When he approached her, she kissed him on the forehead, causing him to enter a nine-month-long trance which he described as "divine bliss", with a lack of consciousness of his body. Babajan predicted that he would become a spiritual leader. He then encountered Upasni Maharaj, who he later said helped him to integrate his mystical experiences with ordinary consciousness, thus enabling him to function in the world without diminishing his experience of God-realisation.

Over the next several years, he encountered other spiritual figures, namely Tajuddin Baba, Narayan Maharaj, and Sai Baba of Shirdi, who, along with Babajan and Upasni Maharaj, Baba later said were the five "Perfect Masters" of the age. By early 1922, at the age of 27, Baba began gathering his own disciples. They gave him the name Meher Baba, which means "compassionate father".

In 1922, Meher Baba and his followers established Manzil-e-Meem (House of the Master) in Mumbai. There, Baba commenced his practice of demanding strict discipline and obedience from his disciples. A year later, Baba and his mandali moved to an area a few miles outside Ahmednagar which he named Meherabad. This ashram would become the center for his work. During the 1920s, Meher Baba opened a school, hospital, and dispensary at Meherabad, all of which were free and open to all castes and faiths.

From 10 July 1925 until the end of his life, Meher Baba maintained silence. He communicated first through chalk and slate, then by an alphabet board, and later via a unique repertoire of gestures. On 1 December 1926, he wrote his last message, and began relying on an alphabet board. With his mandali (circle of disciples), he spent long periods in seclusion, during which he often fasted. He also traveled widely, held public gatherings, and engaged in works of charity with lepers and the poor.

=== 1930–1939: First contact with the West ===
Beginning in 1931, Meher Baba made the first of many visits to the West. Throughout that decade, Meher Baba began a period of world travel and took several trips to Europe and the United States. It was during this period that he established contact with his first close group of Western disciples. He traveled on a Persian passport, as he had given up writing, as well as speaking, and would not sign the forms required by the British government of India.

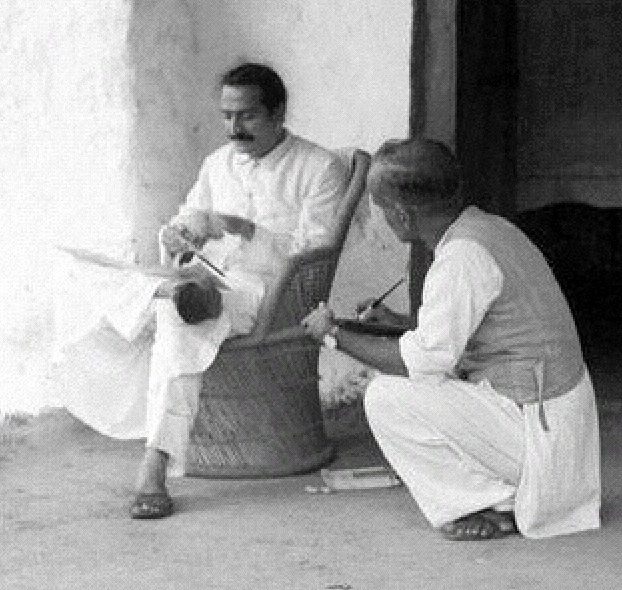
Meher Baba dictating a message to a disciple in 1936 using his alphabet board

On his first trip to England in 1931, he traveled on the SS Rajputana, at the same time as Mahatma Gandhi, who was sailing to the second Round Table Conference in London. Baba and Gandhi met three times on board. One of these exchanges lasted for three hours. The British press publicized these meetings, but an aide to Gandhi said, "You may say emphatically that Gandhi never asked Meher Baba for help or for spiritual or other advice."

In the West, Meher Baba met with a number of celebrities and artists, including Gary Cooper, Charles Laughton, Tallulah Bankhead, Boris Karloff, Tom Mix, Maurice Chevalier, and Ernst Lubitsch. On 1 June 1932, Mary Pickford and Douglas Fairbanks, Jr. held a reception for Baba at Pickfair at which he delivered a message to Hollywood. As a result, says Robert S. Ellwood, Meher Baba emerged as "one of the enthusiasms of the '30s".

In 1934, after announcing that he would break his self-imposed silence in the Hollywood Bowl, Baba changed his plans abruptly, boarded the RMS Empress of Canada, and sailed to Hong Kong without explanation. The Associated Press reported that "Baba had decided to postpone the word-fast-breaking until next February because 'conditions are not yet ripe'." He returned to England in 1936, but did not return to the United States again until the early 1950s.

In the late 1930s, Meher Baba invited a group of Western women to join him in India, where he arranged a series of trips throughout India and British Ceylon that became known as the Blue Bus Tours. When the tour returned home, many newspapers treated their journey as an occasion for scandal. Time magazine's 1936 review of God Is My Adventure describes the US's fascination with the "long-haired, silky-mustached Parsee named Shri Sadgaru [sic] Meher Baba" four years earlier.

=== 1940–1949: Masts and the New Life ===
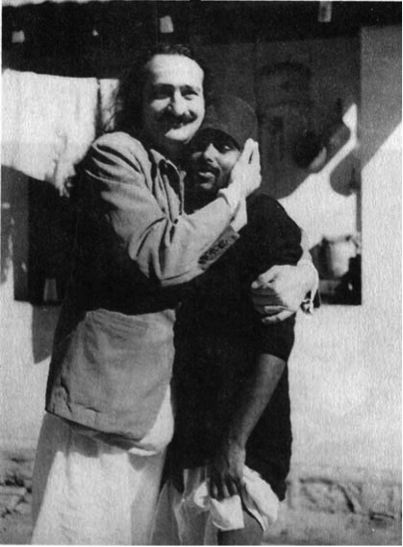
Meher Baba with a mast in Bangalore, 1940

In the 1930s and 1940s, Meher Baba worked with masts, or those "intoxicated with God". According to Baba, these individuals are disabled by their enchanting experience of the higher spiritual planes. Although outwardly masts may appear irrational or insane, Baba claimed that their spiritual status was elevated, and that by meeting with them he helped them to progress spiritually while enlisting their aid in his spiritual work. One of these masts, Mohammed, lived at Meher Baba's encampment at Meherabad until his death in 2003.

During his journey in 1946, Meher Baba went to Sehwan Sharif to meet a Sufi saint and descendant of Lal Shahbaz Qalandar, Murshid Nadir Ali Shah, whom Baba referred to as an advanced pilgrim.

In 1949, Baba began a period that he called the New Life. Following a series of questions on their readiness to obey even the most difficult of his requests, Baba selected twenty companions to join him in a life of complete "hopelessness and helplessness".

He made provisions for those dependent on him, after which he and his companions otherwise gave up nearly all property and financial responsibilities. They traveled around India incognito while begging for food and carrying out Baba's instructions according to a strict set of conditions, including acceptance of any circumstance and consistent good cheer in the face of any difficulty. Companions who failed to comply were sent away.

Concerning the New Life, Meher Baba wrote:

This New Life is endless, and even after my physical death it will be kept alive by those who live the life of complete renunciation of falsehood, lies, hatred, anger, greed and lust; and who, to accomplish all this, do no lustful actions, do no harm to anyone, do no backbiting, do not seek material possessions or power, who accept no homage, neither covet honor nor shun disgrace, and fear no one and nothing; by those who rely wholly and solely on God, and who love God purely for the sake of loving; who believe in the lovers of God and in the reality of Manifestation, and yet do not expect any spiritual or material reward; who do not let go the hand of Truth, and who, without being upset by calamities, bravely and wholeheartedly face all hardships with one hundred percent cheerfulness, and give no importance to caste, creed and religious ceremonies. This New Life will live by itself eternally, even if there is no one to live it.

Meher Baba ended the New Life in February 1952 and once again began a round of public appearances throughout India and the West.

=== 1950–1959: God Speaks and automobile accidents ===
After being injured as a passenger in two serious automobile accidents, one near Prague, Oklahoma in the United States in 1952, and one in India in 1956, Meher Baba's ability to walk became limited.

In the 1950s, Baba established two centers outside of India, namely the Meher Spiritual Center in North Myrtle Beach, South Carolina in the United States and Avatar's Abode near Brisbane, Australia. He inaugurated the Meher Spiritual Center in April 1952. On 24 May 1952, en route from the Meher Spiritual Center to Meher Mount in Ojai, California, the car in which he was a passenger was struck head-on near Prague, Oklahoma. He and his companions were thrown from the vehicle and injured. Baba's leg was severely broken and he sustained facial injuries including a broken nose. The injured were treated at Prague Memorial Hospital, after which they returned to Myrtle Beach to recuperate. While recuperating at Youpon Dunes, a home owned by Elizabeth Patterson, he worked on the charter for a group of Sufis, which he named Sufism Reoriented.

In August 1953, in Dehradun, Meher Baba began dictating his major book, God Speaks, The Theme of Creation and Its Purpose. He dedicated this book "To the Universe — the Illusion that sustains Reality". In September 1954, Meher Baba gave a men-only sahavas at Meherabad that later became known as the Three Incredible Weeks. During this time Baba issued a declaration, "Meher Baba's Call", wherein he once again affirmed his Avatarhood "irrespective of the doubts and convictions" of others. At the end of this sahavas, Meher Baba gave the completed manuscript of his book God Speaks to two members of Sufism Reoriented, Ludwig H. Dimpfl and Don E. Stevens, for editing and publication in America. The book was published by Dodd, Mead and Company the following year.

On 30 September 1954, Meher Baba gave his Final Declaration message.

In October 1954, Meher Baba discarded his alphabet board and began using a unique set of hand gestures to communicate, which he used for the rest of his life.

On 2 December 1956, outside Satara, India, the car in which Meher Baba was riding lost control and a second serious automobile accident occurred. Baba suffered a fractured pelvis and other severe injuries. Nilu, one of Baba's mandali, was killed. This collision seriously incapacitated Baba. Despite his physicians' predictions, Baba began to walk again, but from that point was in constant pain and had limited mobility. During his trip to the West in 1958, he often needed to be carried from venue to venue.

In 1956, during his fifth visit to the United States, Baba stayed at New York's Hotel Delmonico before traveling to the Meher Spiritual Center at North Myrtle Beach, South Carolina. In July he traveled to Washington, D.C., and received friends and disciples at the home of Ivy Duce, wife of James Terry Duce, the vice-president of the Arabian American Oil Company. He then traveled to Meher Mount at Ojai, California before proceeding to Australia. His final visits to the United States and Australia were made in 1958.

=== 1960–1969: Final years and death ===
In 1962, Baba held one of his last public functions, a mass meeting in India called the East-West Gathering. At these meetings, at which his Western followers were invited to meet his Indian disciples, Baba gave darshan to many thousands, despite the physical strain this caused him. Despite deteriorating health, he continued what he called his "Universal Work", which included fasting and seclusion, until his death. In the mid-1960s Baba became concerned with the drug culture in the West and began correspondences with several Western academics, including Timothy Leary and Richard Alpert, in which he discouraged the use of hallucinogenic drugs for spiritual purposes. In 1966, Baba's responses to questions on drugs were published in a pamphlet titled God in a Pill? Baba stated that drug use was spiritually damaging and that if enlightenment were possible through drugs then "God is not worthy of being God". Baba instructed his young Western disciples to spread this message; in doing so, they increased awareness of Baba's teachings. In an interview with Frederick Chapman, a Harvard graduate and Fulbright scholar who met Baba during a year of study in India, Baba described LSD as "harmful physically, mentally, and spiritually" and warned that "[its continued use] leads to madness or death". Baba lovers in the United States, Europe, and Australia initiated an anti-drug campaign during this period. Though some contend that this campaign was mostly futile, it attracted new followers to Baba. Furthermore, some of Baba's views entered into academic debate on the merits and dangers of hallucinogens.

From the East-West Gathering of 1962 onward, Baba's health deteriorated. Despite the physical toll it took on his body, he continued to undergo periods of seclusion and fasting. In late July 1968, Baba stated that he had completed a particularly taxing period of seclusion and noted that his work was "completed 100% to my satisfaction". He was by then using a wheelchair. Within a few months, his condition had worsened and he was bedridden, wracked by muscle spasms without clear medical origin. Despite the care of several physicians, the spasms worsened. On 31 January 1969, at 12:15 p.m., he died after a violent spasm wracked his body. He conveyed by his last gestures, "Do not forget that I am God." In time, his devotees called the anniversary of his death Amartithi (deathless day). Baba's body was placed at his samadhi at Meherabad, India, covered with roses and cooled by ice. His body was kept available to the public for one week before its final burial. Prior to his death, Baba had made extensive preparations for a public darshan program to be held in Pune. His mandali decided to proceed with the arrangements despite the absence of the host. Several thousand attended this "Last Darshan", including many hundreds from the United States, Europe, and Australia. His samadhi in Meherabad has become a place of international pilgrimage.

== Silence ==
From 10 July 1925, until his death in 1969, Meher Baba was silent. He communicated first by using an alphabet board and later by unique hand gestures which were interpreted and spoken out by one of his mandali, often Eruch Jessawala. Meher Baba said that his silence was not undertaken as a spiritual exercise but solely in connection with his universal work.

Man's inability to live God's words makes the Avatar's teaching a mockery. Instead of practicing the compassion he taught, man has waged wars in his name. Instead of living the humility, purity, and truth of his words, man has given way to hatred, greed, and violence. Because man has been deaf to the principles and precepts laid down by God in the past, in this present Avataric form, I observe silence.

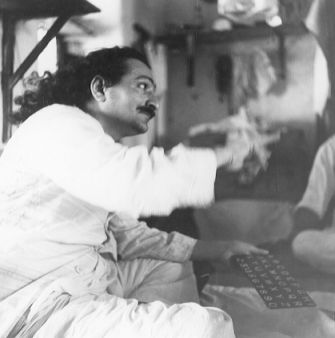
From 1925 until 1954 Meher Baba communicated by pointing to letters on an alphabet board.

Meher Baba often signaled the moment "that he would 'break' his silence by speaking the 'Word' in every heart, thereby giving a spiritual push forward to all living things".

When I break My Silence, the impact of My Love will be universal and all life in creation will know, feel and receive of it. It will help every individual to break himself free from his own bondage in his own way. I am the Divine Beloved who loves you more than you can ever love yourself. The breaking of My Silence will help you to help yourself in knowing your real Self.

Meher Baba asserted that the breaking of his silence would be a defining event in the spiritual evolution of the world.

When I speak that Word, I shall lay the foundation for that which is to take place during the next seven hundred years.

On many occasions Meher Baba promised to break his silence with an audible word before he died, often stating a specific time and place when this would occur, but according to all contemporary accounts, Meher Baba remained silent until his death. His failure to break his silence disappointed some of his followers, while others viewed it as a test of their faith. Some of his followers speculate that "the Word" will yet be "spoken" or that Meher Baba broke his silence in a spiritual rather than a physical way.

For many years Meher Baba asked his followers to undertake austerities on 10 July, the anniversary of the day his silence began, such as keeping silence, fasting, and praying. In his final Silence Day request to his followers in 1968, he asked only that they keep silent. Many followers continue to celebrate Silence Day by keeping silence in his honor.

On July 10, 2026, the 101st anniversary of Meher Baba’s silence day was observed.

== Teachings ==
Meher Baba's teachings can be divided into two interrelated categories: his metaphysics on the nature of the soul and the universe, and practical advice for the spiritual aspirant. His metaphysics is mostly found in his principal book on the subject, God Speaks. It contains detailed statements on his cosmology, the purpose of life, and the progression of the soul. His teachings on the practical spiritual life are mostly contained in the Discourses, although it also covers many metaphysical areas mirroring or amplifying God Speaks.

=== God Speaks ===
God Speaks describes the journey of the soul from its original state of unconscious divinity to the ultimate attainment of conscious divinity. The whole journey is a journey of imagination, in which the original indivisible state of God imagines becoming countless individualised souls which he likens to bubbles within an infinite ocean. Each soul, powered by the desire to become conscious, starts its journey in the most rudimentary form of consciousness. This limitation brings the need of a more developed form to advance it towards an increasingly conscious state. Consciousness grows in relation to the impressions each form is capable of gathering.

According to Meher Baba, each soul pursues conscious divinity by evolving; that is, experiencing itself in a succession of imagined forms through seven "kingdoms" of stone/metal, vegetable, worm, fish, bird, animal, and human. The soul identifies itself with each successive form, becoming thus tied to illusion. During this evolution of forms, the power of thought increases, until in human form thought becomes infinite. Although in human form, the soul is capable of conscious divinity, all the impressions that it has gathered during evolution are illusory ones that create a barrier against the soul knowing itself. For this barrier to be overcome, further births in human form are needed in a process known as reincarnation.

The soul will reach a stage where its previously gathered impressions grow thin or weak enough that it enters a final stage called involution. This stage also requires a series of human births, during which the soul begins an inner journey, by which it realises its true identity as God. Baba breaks this inner journey into seven stages he called "planes". The process culminates, at the seventh plane, with God-realisation, at which the goal of life for the soul is reached.

=== Discourses ===
The Discourses are a collection of explanations that Meher Baba has given on topics that concern the advancement of the spiritual aspirant. These topics include: sanskaras (mental impressions), Maya (the principle of illusion), the nature of the ego, reincarnation, karma, violence and non-violence, meditation, love, discipleship, and God-realisation. His explanations often include stories from the lore of India and the Sufi culture. One such story, the wise man and the ghost, shows the power that superstitious beliefs can have on a person, while another, Majnun and Layla, shows how selfless love, even in human relations, can lead one to discipleship.

Meher Baba's suggestions include putting theory into practice, internally renouncing desires, offering selfless service to humanity or the master, spontaneity, and avoiding actions that bind one to illusion. Rather than lay out moral rules, Baba explains why some actions bind the individual whereas others aid emancipation. Several chapters discuss the mechanisms by which consciousness gets caught up between the opposites of experience, such as pleasure and pain, good and evil, and suggest how to transcend these opposites.

=== Perfect Masters and the Avatar ===
Meher Baba related that there are 56 incarnate God-realised souls on Earth at any given time. Of these souls there are always five who constitute the five Perfect Masters of their era. When one of the five Perfect Masters dies, another God-realised soul immediately replaces him or her.

The Avatar, according to Baba, is a special Perfect Master, the first soul to achieve God-realisation. This soul, the original Perfect Master, or Ancient One, never ceases to incarnate. Baba indicated that this soul personifies the state of God called Vishnu in Hinduism and Parvardigar in Sufism, i.e. the sustainer or preserver state of God. Baba taught that the Avatar appears on Earth every 700–1400 years and is "brought down" into human form by the five Perfect Masters of the time to aid creation in the endless process of moving toward Godhood. Baba claimed that in other ages this role had been fulfilled by Zoroaster, Rama, Krishna, Buddha, Jesus, and Muhammad.

Baba described the Avatar as "a gauge against which man can measure what he is and what he may become. He trues the standard of human values by interpreting them in terms of divinely human life."

Most of Meher Baba's followers accept his claim of avatarhood, and he is said to be "revered by millions around the world as the Avatar of the age and a God-realized being".

== Legacy ==
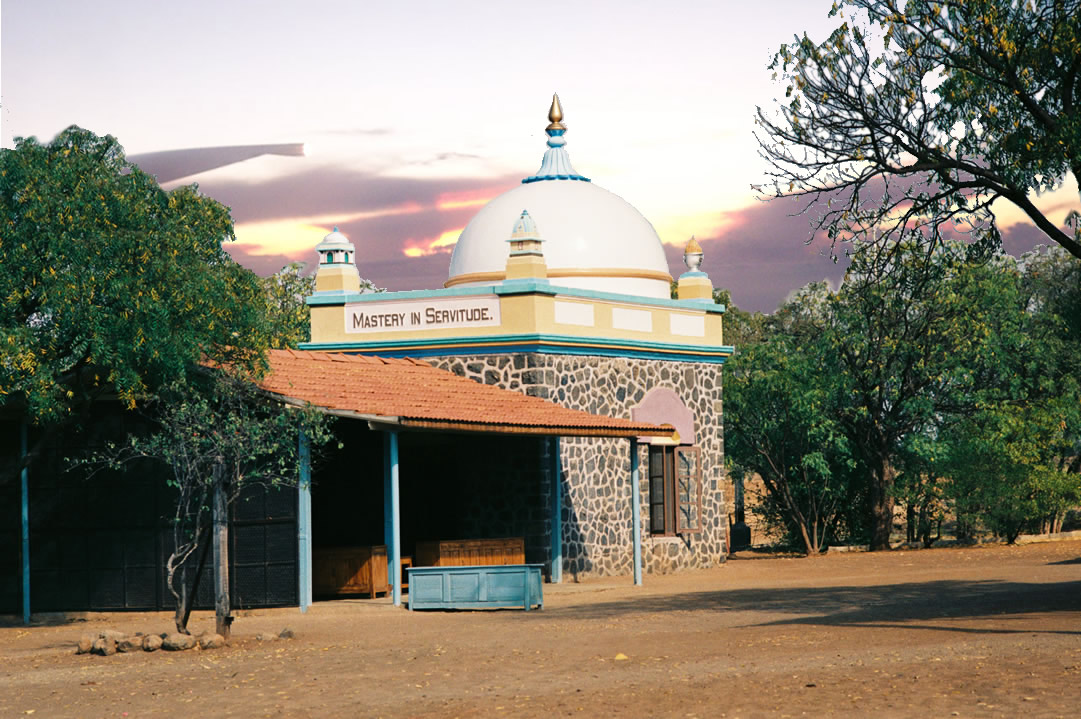
Meher Baba's tomb in Meherabad

Meher Baba's travels and teachings left a legacy of followers and devotees worldwide.

The Avatar Meher Baba Charitable Trust, established by Meher Baba in 1959, maintains his tomb and pilgrimage facilities, as well as a free school and dispensary, a cataract clinic, and a veterinary clinic. The Trust follows the charter Meher Baba left for it, but does not act as spiritual authority over groups. Likewise, the Trust does not engage in propaganda, promote creeds or dogmas, or seek converts. Baba discouraged evangelizing, stating, "I need no propaganda or publicity." Rather, he encouraged his followers to "let your life itself be my message of love and truth to others" and to "spread my message of Love and Truth as far and wide as possible". Though some followers of Meher Baba have no established rituals, others perform practices such as pujas, aartis, prayers, music, plays, and viewing films of Baba. The primary focus for many followers is living as Meher Baba would approve, such as by abstaining from marijuana and psychedelic drugs, and trying to remember God with love.

Gatherings of Baba followers are generally informal. Special effort is made to gather together on Amartithi, the anniversary of Baba's death, and on his birthday. Many Baba followers keep silent on 10 July (Silence Day), observing the request Baba frequently made of his followers during his lifetime. Aarti is performed morning and evening at Baba's samadhi in India. At Meherabad, his followers maintain Baba's practice of lighting a dhuni fire on the 12th of each month.

== In popular culture ==
Meher Baba had gained public attention in the West as early as 1932, due to contacts with celebrities of the time, and from the rather disillusioned account of Paul Brunton in his A Search in Secret India (1934). Baba received further attention posthumously via various mentions in Western pop-culture.

For example, Pete Townshend of the Who became a follower of Baba and dedicated his 1969 rock opera Tommy to him in the gatefold. The Who's 1971 song "Baba O'Riley" was named in part after Meher Baba, and Townshend recorded several Meher Baba tribute albums and music videos including Happy Birthday, I Am, Who Came First, With Love, and You Alone Exist.

In 1969, Indian filmmaker Jagat Murari co-produced the ethnographic film on Meher Baba titled The Awakener. The 35-millimeter, 118 minute found footage film was distributed by Films Division of India.

In 1970, Melanie Safka (stage name "Melanie") mentioned Baba in the spoken word intro to her song "Lay Down (Candles in the Rain)". Listed as a standalone piece entitled "Candles in the Rain", the lyrics are "Meher Baba lives again". Bobby McFerrin's 1988 Grammy Award–winning song "Don't Worry, Be Happy" was inspired by Baba's adage, which has appeared on many posters and inspirational cards depicting him.

Various Indian films produced by Edida Nageswara Rao have depicted Meher Baba's images. Works such as Swathi Kiranam (1992) were exclusively filmed at the Meher Baba center in Tapeswaram, Andhra Pradesh, depicting life size images of Meher Baba.

Elements of Meher Baba's philosophy, as well as an unnamed character based upon him, have appeared in the works of comic book writer and screenwriter J. M. DeMatteis. Works particularly influenced by Baba include DeMatteis' scripts for Doctor Fate and DeMatteis creator-owned comic book Seekers into the Mystery. The Theme of Creation (2005) was an American documentary film produced, written, edited and directed by Tim Thelen. Nagendra Babu played young Meher Baba in the 2009 film Jagadguru Sri Shiridi Saibaba.

In 2012, the feature film Nema Aviona za Zagreb premiered in the Netherlands with an exclusive interview with Meher Baba filmed in 1967. In the interview, Baba explains the difference between God-realisation and drug-induced hallucinations and the scene plays a pivotal role in the documentary's narrative.

The Visa – A Meher Baba film was produced by Sufism Reoriented's American Young Adult Sahavas team in 2018, and stars followers of Meher Baba such as Natasha K. Mehta. Meher Filmworks produces and archives remastered film footage of Meher Baba.

== Gallery ==
Major centers of pilgrimage

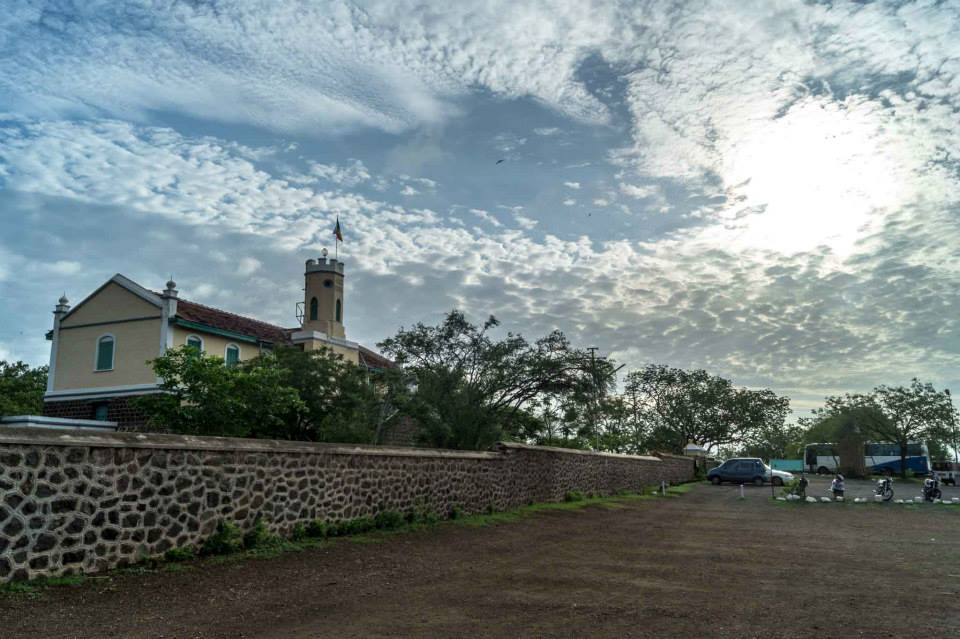
Upper Meherabad, near Ahmednagar, India

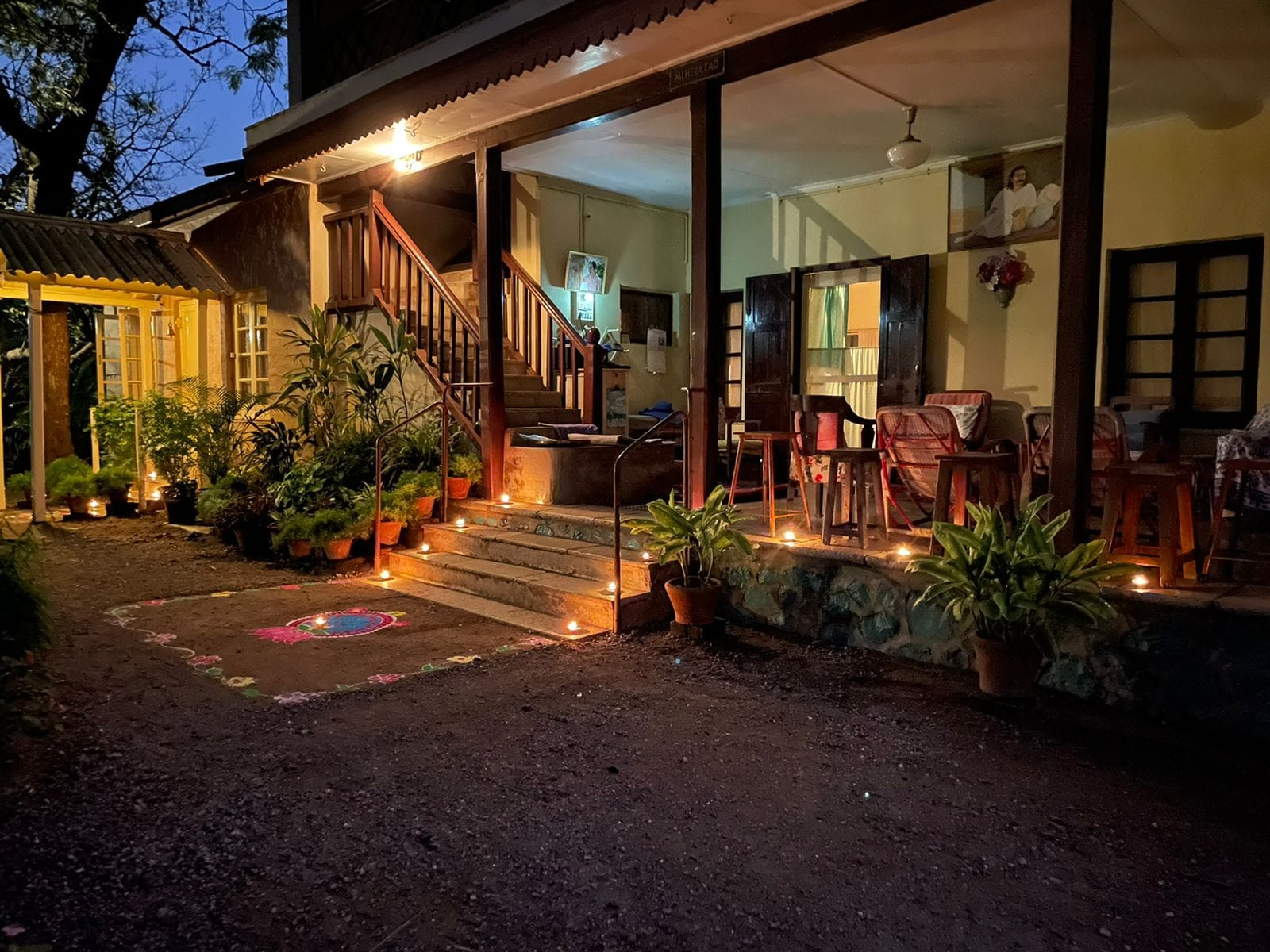
Mandali House in Meherazad, Ahmednagar, India

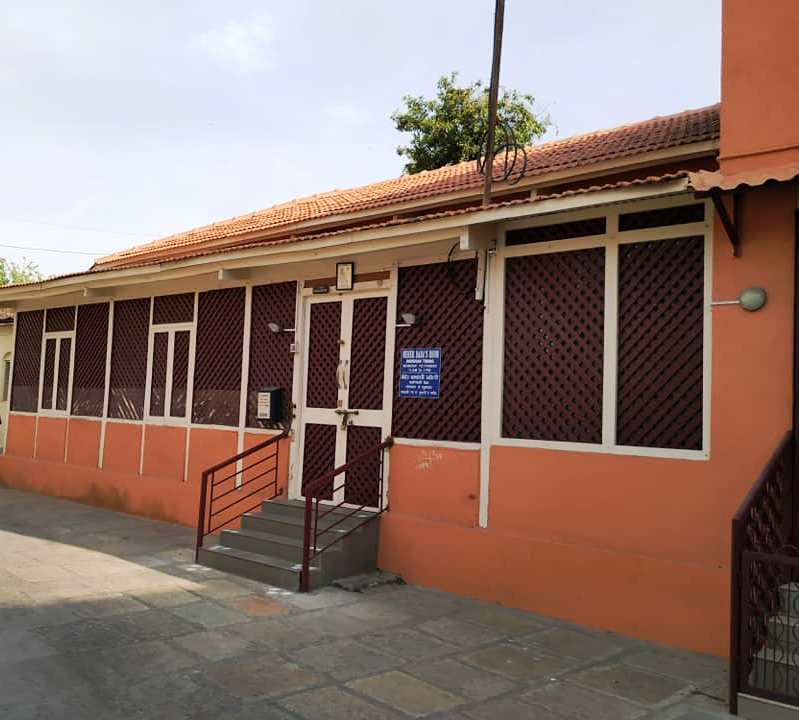
Meher Baba's House in Pune, India

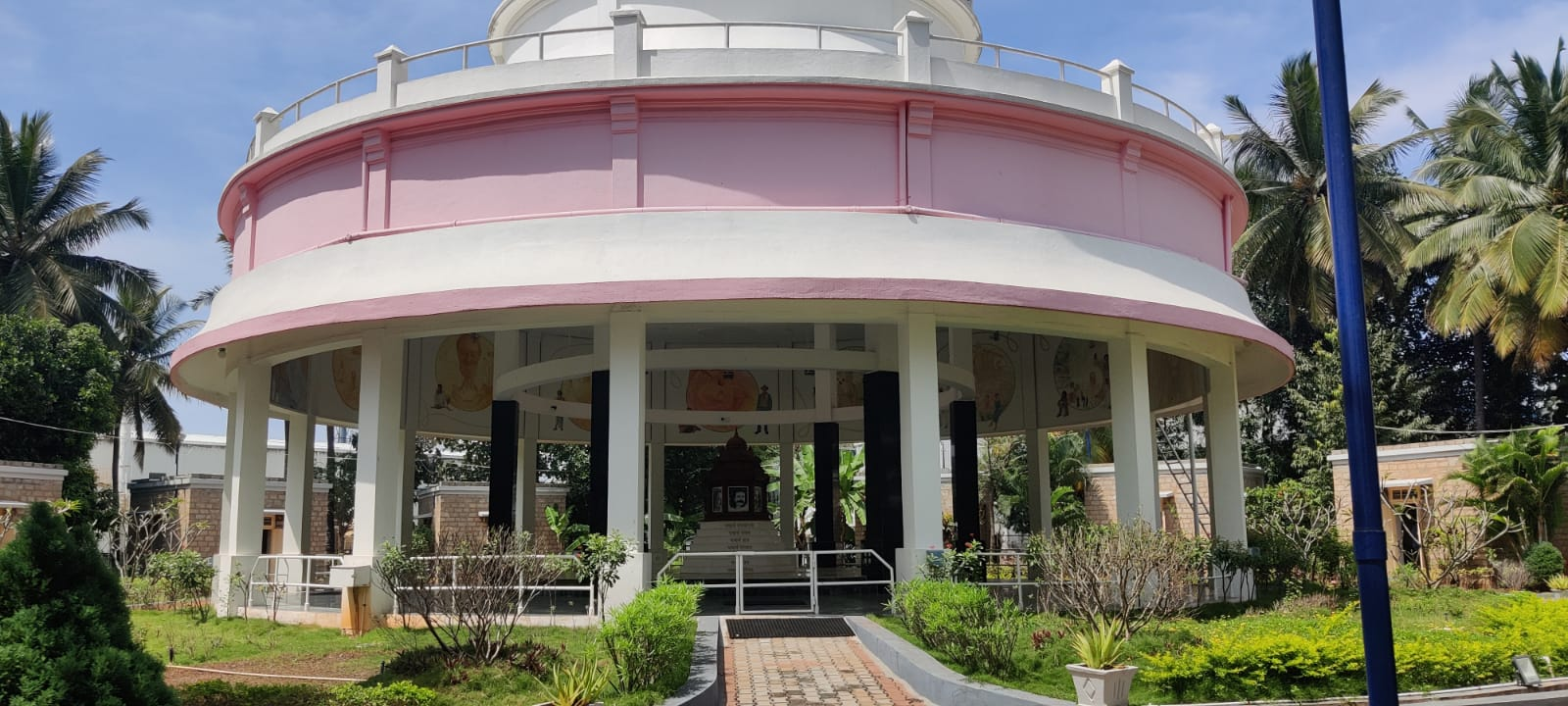
Universal Spiritual Center in Byramangala, Karnataka, India

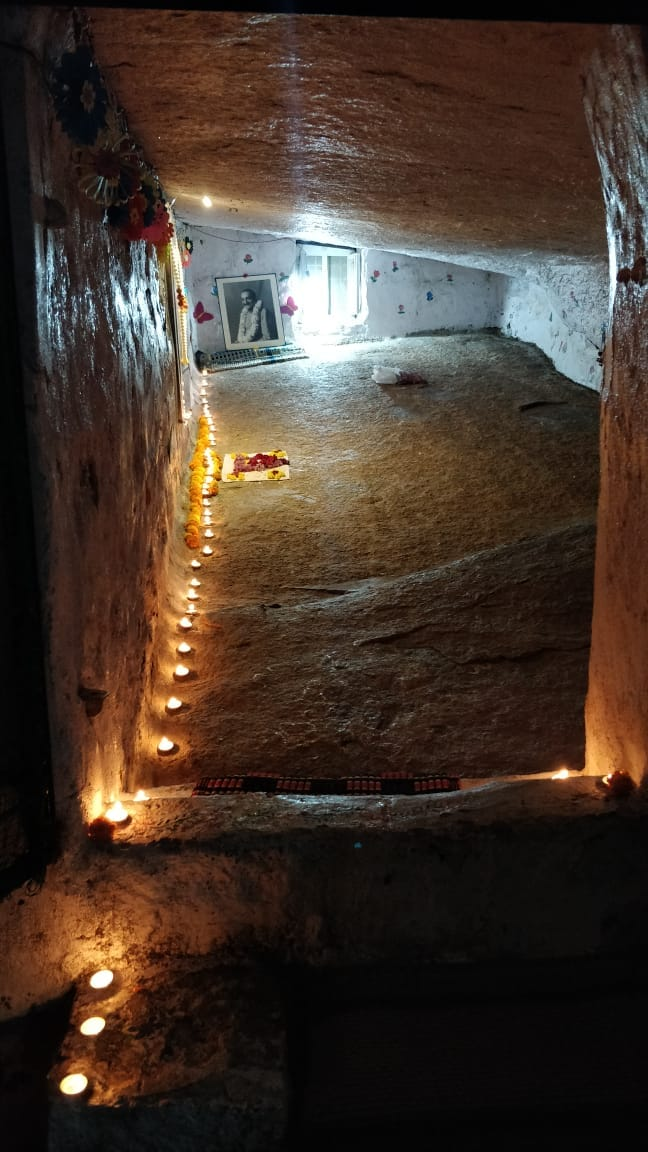
Meher Baba's Manonash Cave in Khajaguda, Hyderabad, India

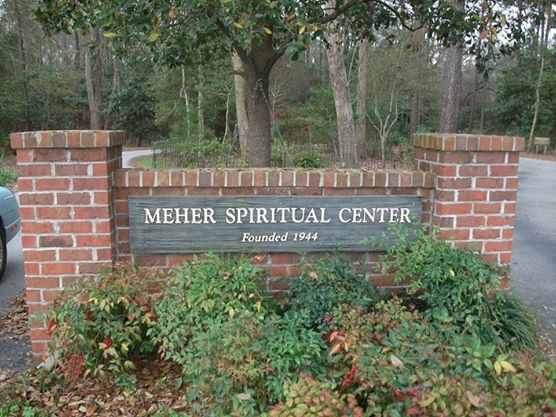
Meher Spiritual Center Entrance in North Myrtle Beach, South Carolina, USA

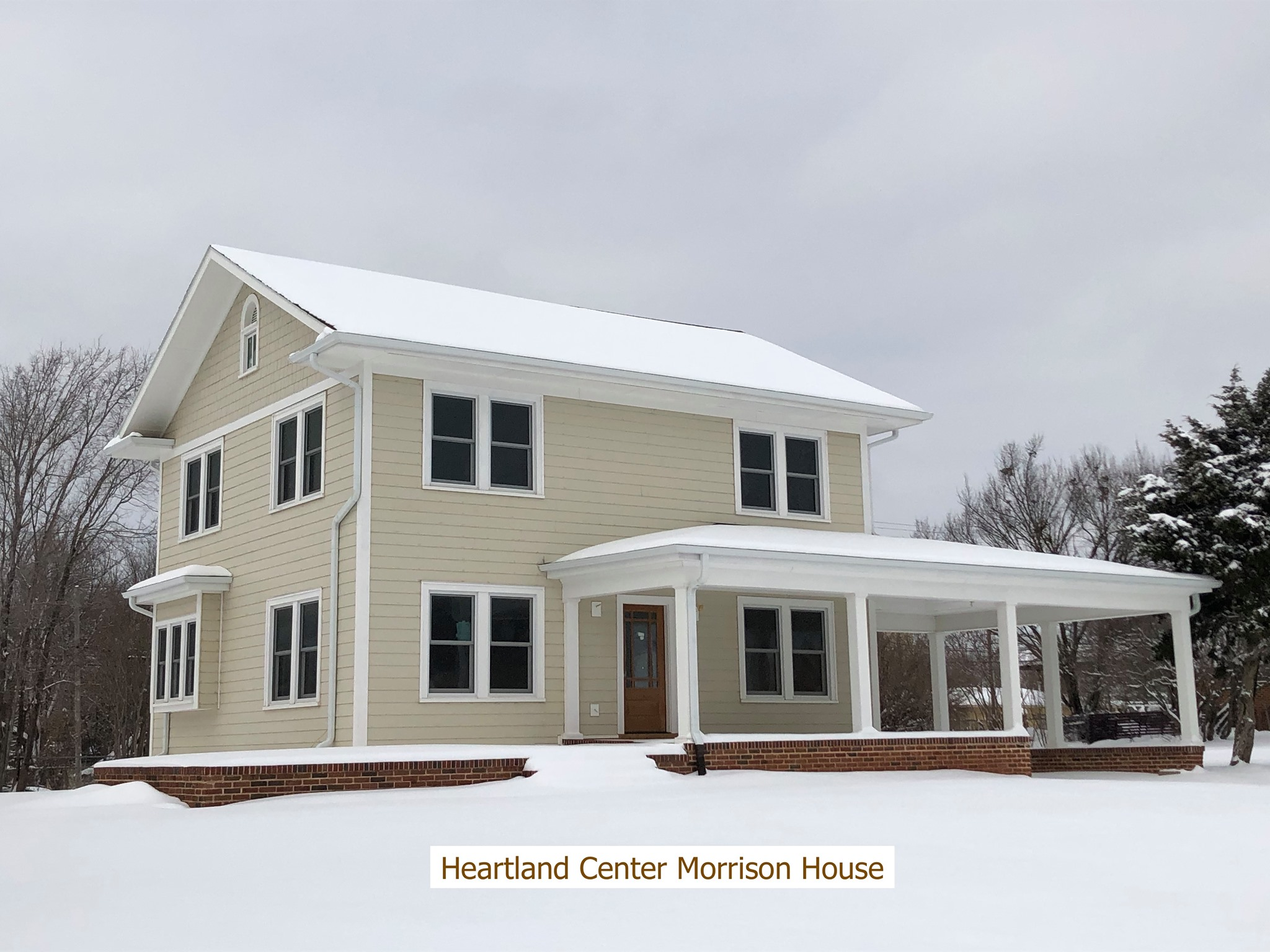
Meher Baba Heartland Center in Prague, Oklahoma, USA

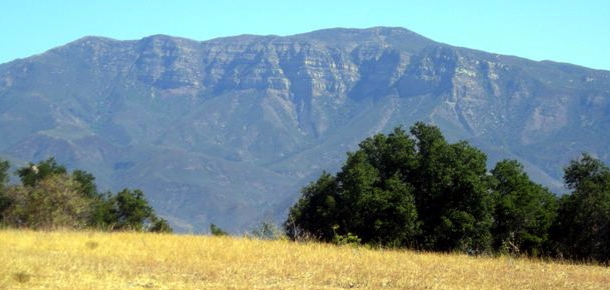
Meher Mount Center in Sulphur Mountain, Ojai, California, US

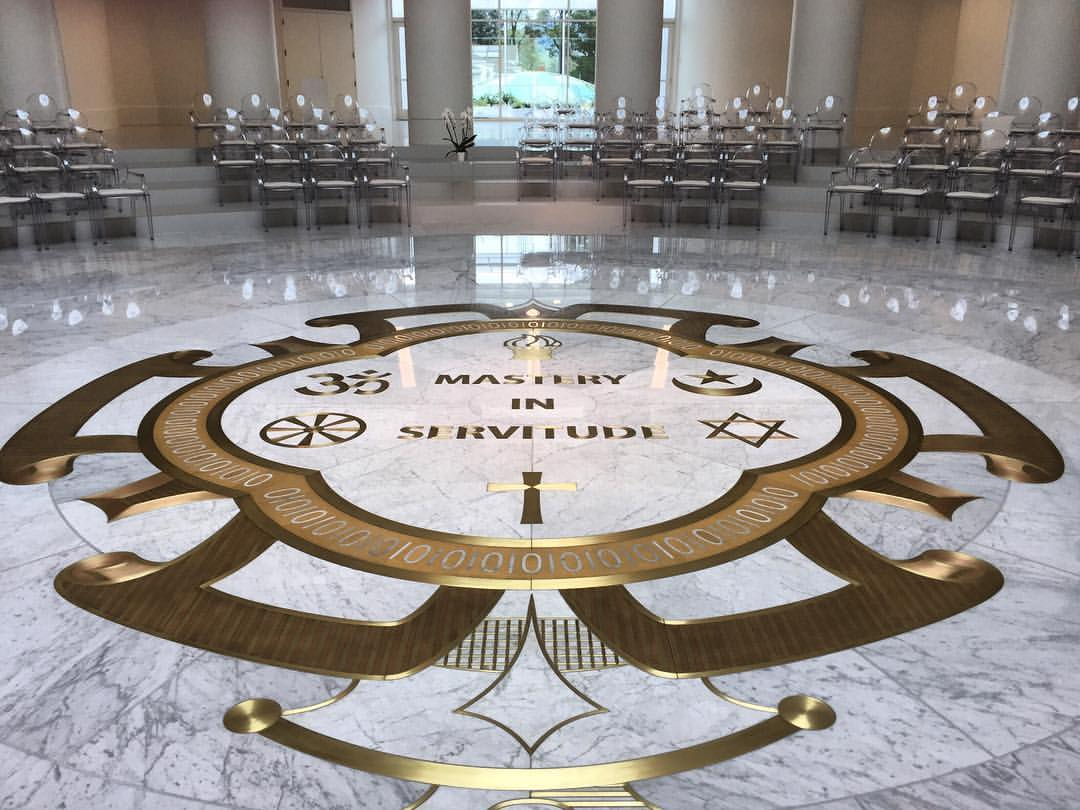
Sufism Reoriented Sanctuary in Walnut Creek, California, USA

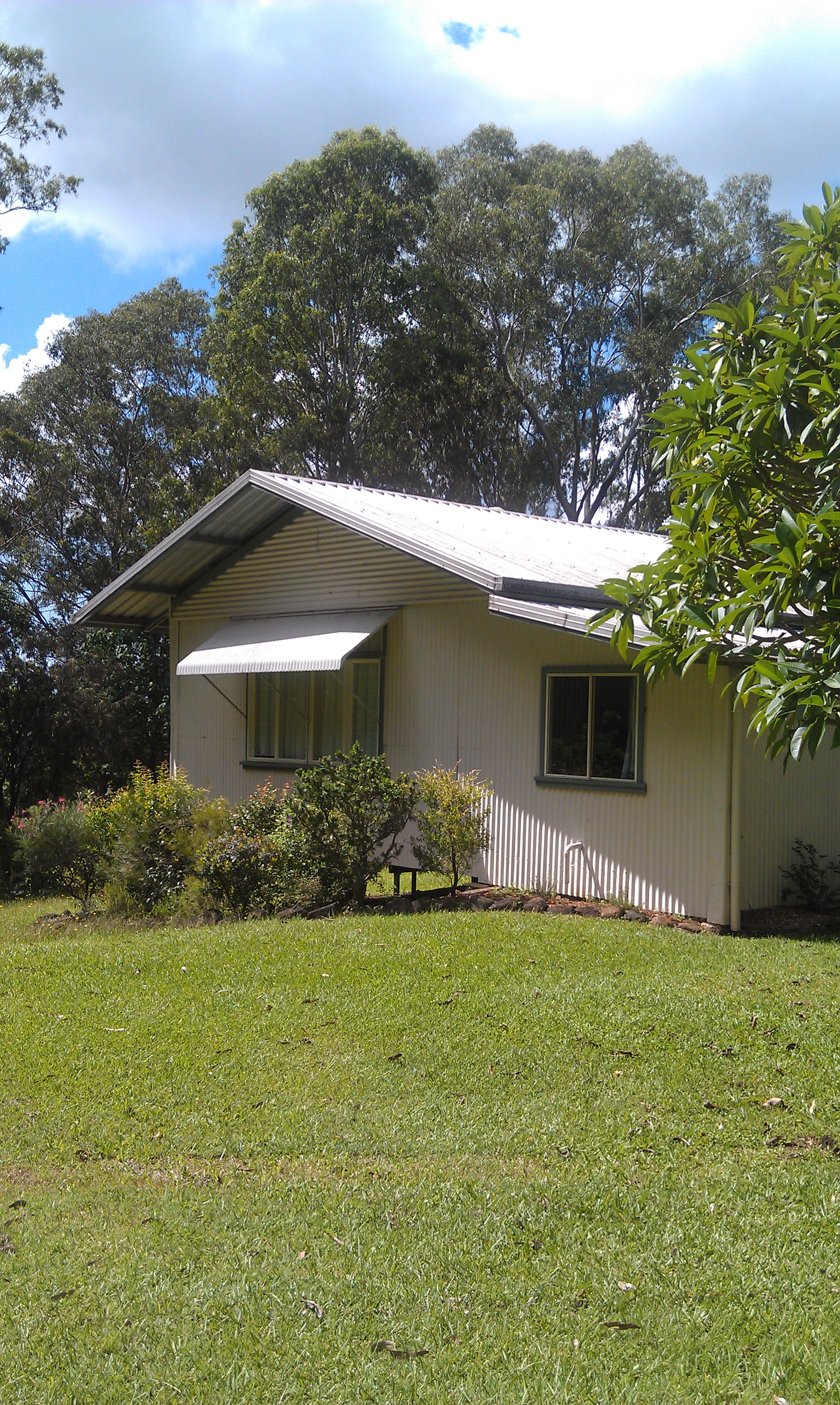
The Avatar's Abode in Kiels Mountain, Queensland, Australia
