= God Speaks =

1955 book by Meher Baba

- Author: Meher Baba
- Language: English
- Published: 1955 (Dodd, Mead); 1997 (Sufism Reoriented)
- Publication place: United States
- Media type: Print (hardback)
- ISBN: 978-0-915828-02-9
- OCLC: 39121011

God Speaks: The Theme of Creation and Its Purpose is the principal book by Meher Baba, and the most significant scripture used by his followers. It covers Meher Baba's view of the process of creation and its purpose and has been in print continuously since 1955.

== Overview ==
God Speaks is Meher Baba's most significant published book. Kenneth Lux, Ph.D. writes: "God Speaks is Meher Baba's major book and it is famously difficult. But not only is it Baba's major book, it is his only book. All other books by Meher Baba, such as the Discourses and Listen Humanity, are not written as books, as God Speaks is, but are collections of essays and messages."

While Meher Baba declared "I come not to teach, but to awaken" and did not prescribe intellect as a path to perfection, in God Speaks Meher Baba goes deeper into the subject of metaphysics than other Indian spiritual masters. In his book Mastery of Consciousness, Allan Y. Cohen, Ph.D. writes that Meher Baba's "explanations of the creation, purpose, and evolution of the universe may be the most explicit ever written." In a review of God Speaks, oriental scholar Walter Evans-Wentz, the original English translator of The Tibetan book of the dead, wrote: "No other Teacher in our own time or in any known past time has so minutely analyzed consciousness as Meher Baba has in God Speaks."

God Speaks takes a strictly nondualist approach in explaining the universe and its purpose, carefully clarifying and syncretising terms as it takes the reader through the spiritual journey of the atma (soul) through its imagined evolution, reincarnation, and involution, to its goal, its origin, of Paramatma (Over-soul). The journey winds up being one from God-unconscious ("Beyond Beyond State of God") to God-conscious ("Beyond State of God"). Cohen summarizes, "In elaborate detail he explains the universe is an arena where infinite existence, identifying with the apparently limited soul, becomes more and more conscious of its oneness with itself as the Over-Soul.

== Birth of consciousness ==
According to God Speaks, in the evolution of consciousness, before the Soul has any consciousness of anything or itself, there is an infinite, impressionless unconscious tranquil state. Meher Baba calls this state the Eternal Beyond-Beyond State of God (or Paratpar Paramatma), which has no experience of Self, nor of any of its Infinite latent attributes. Latent in this Infinite state is the undifferentiated and unmanifested Everything. Meher Baba says that the state of the man's consciousness during sound sleep is literally the same original divine sound sleep state of God. Synopsizing this concept in God Speaks biographer Charles Purdom writes, "In the beginningless beginning, in the beyond the beyond, God Is in absolute sound sleep.

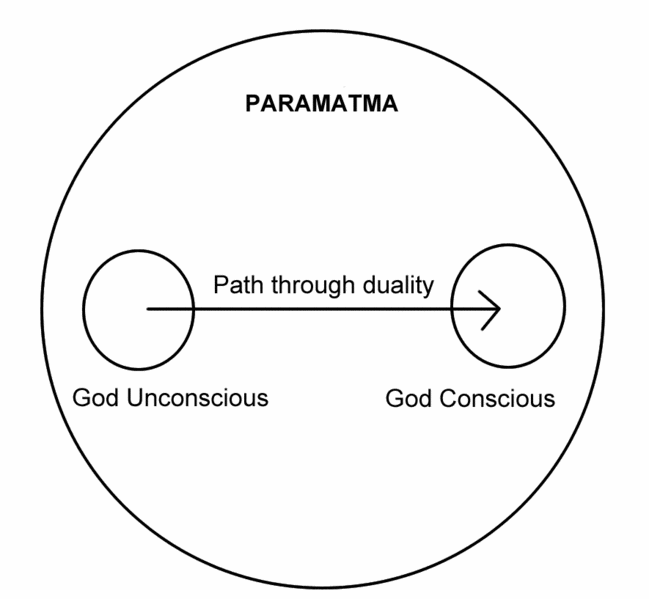

Meher Baba writes that in Everything is also included the Nothing. Latent in Paramatma is the First Urge, which is expressed by the question "Who Am I?". This First Urge at one finite but unlimited point becomes manifest as the "Om Point" or the "Creation Point". Through this point the Nothing gradually appears as the shadow of the Everything and this appearance starts expanding ad infinitum. Simultaneously with the manifestation of the First Urge, the infinite Soul, in a tremendous shock, experiences its very first gross impression as it identifies itself with the projected Nothingness. In this experience, the first illusory separation (sense of separate identity) takes place in the undifferentiated. The Soul, still not conscious of its true Self, becomes identified with its projected shadow through this very first impression, thus initiating the illusion of duality.

To make this first event more approachable to understanding, Baba gives the metaphor of an Infinite ocean and a drop of that ocean. In this metaphor, Paramatma (a vedantic term, for which Meher Baba says Over-soul would be the closest western equivalent) is likened to an infinite and limitless ocean. Any drop of this ocean (the drop signifying the individuated soul) is the ocean itself, since no differentiation between drops has yet been conceived. If we liken the manifestation of the First Urge as the imagined separation of one drop from the ocean, then the infinite ocean comes to look upon itself through this drop as merely this most finite, most limited drop of the infinite and unlimited ocean. It is important to keep in mind that here Meher Baba is using metaphor and analogy to explain changes in God's imagination and the development of consciousness and that he is not describing a metaphysical ocean or literal drops in any sense. As Charles Purdom writes, "The 'ocean' is a symbol, no more.

== Development of consciousness ==
=== Evolution ===
The very first forms which the indivisible Soul's consciousness identifies its eternal Self with, according to Meher Baba, are seven gaseous forms (the seventh of which is Hydrogen, according to a footnote). Yet since these are very abstract forms, beyond ordinary human understanding, for the sake of convenience, the first form which consciousness associates itself with is described as the stone-form. Through the medium of this form the individualized soul, experiencing impressions related to the kingdom of stones, associates itself with the stone. When all impressions arising from this association have been experienced and exhausted, the soul dissociates itself from that form and associates with the next stone species. When the whole range of impressions through all stone species have been exhausted, the soul starts associating itself with forms of the metal kingdom, and so forth through evolution. In all, seven major leaps are mentioned in this evolutionary process in consciousness: from stone, to metal, to vegetable, to worm, to fish, to bird, to animal and finally to human.

Meher Baba describes an unfolding geometric schema of forms. In the stone and metal forms, consciousness asserts itself through a recumbent, folded-up position in the gross world, with no voluntary motion. In the vegetable forms, increased consciousness asserts itself through a vertical position and is depended on soil and rock to hold an upright position. In the worm forms (in which Meher Baba includes for his own purposes all worms, insects, reptiles and amphibians) an animate experience is reached, with voluntary movement, but in a creeping and now horizontal manner. In the fish form, consciousness asserts itself as a creature with voluntary movement in water, but still in a horizontal manner. In bird form consciousness is enriched by identifying itself with a form capable of flight and maintaining a slightly erect position. In (quadruped) animal form, an increasingly erect position is experienced, with much more developed attributes. When the human form is reached, consciousness is fully developed and asserts itself through the ideal medium in a fully upright stance.

Since in God Speaks there is no mention of Charles Darwin's theory of evolution, the progression must be seen as a progression in consciousness rather than in biological linearity. Meher Baba's explanations do not come to disprove any scientific discoveries of biological evolution, but rather examine a different side of the process.

Throughout this process, every time the soul associates itself with a particular form, it collects through this medium impressions of the gross world. When the impressions through association with a particular form have been exhausted, the soul dissociates from that form. Yet the collected impressions must be further experienced and for this the soul associates with the next most developed form. So when the human form is reached, although consciousness is fully developed, it has a store of impressions that still need to be experienced. While the soul is no longer in search of a better medium, it has to go through numerous human forms, until these impressions gathered through evolution are weakened and finally exhausted.

=== Reincarnation ===
Through the entire process of evolution, the soul has been consciously identifying itself with the evolving gross body (sharir), yet, unconsciously, it has also been identifying itself with the evolving subtle and mental body (pran and mana). The subtle sphere refers to energy, or prana, a gross aspect of which is nuclear energy. In the book it is also referred to as the life-giving energy, or the breath of God. The mental sphere refers to the domain of instincts, feelings, and eventually also of thoughts and desires. When the human form is reached, along with the gross body, the subtle and mental bodies also reach full development and although they remain unconscious, the soul indirectly works through them in the corresponding spheres.

When the human body dies, the soul retains and further experiences the collected impressions through its identification with the subtle and mental bodies, until it associates with the next human form and takes apparent birth in it. During the interval between death and birth, the soul experiences intensively an unfolding of the impressions collected, so depending on what quality these impressions have been of (virtue or vice, good or bad), the consciousness of soul experiences either a heaven state or a hell state. After most impressions have been exhausted, a certain temporary equilibrium is reached and the soul is ready to associate itself with the next human form. The process of the soul's successive association with human forms is called reincarnation.

Baba's use of the word "reincarnation" does not correlate with what is described as "transmigration of the soul" in Theosophy and certain other esoteric schools of thought. For Meher Baba the soul does not actually 'migrate' because it doesn't go anywhere, since it is eternally within the Over-soul and has nowhere to go. Rather, for Meher Baba, "reincarnation" refers only to identification and dis-identification with forms conceived in illusion, i.e. "the involuntary process of intermittent association and disassociation of consciousness."

During reincarnation consciousness tries to liberate itself from the burden of collected impressions. Yet, since it tries to achieve this by associating itself with impressions opposite from the previously accumulated ones, it gets further entangled in accumulating fresh impressions. Thus the soul experiences itself in a seemingly endless succession of human lives, as a man or a woman, as rich or poor, strong or weak, beautiful or ugly, black or white, in various places, religions, castes etc. It is only after numerous apparent births and deaths, that the range of human experience starts to get exhausted. In this way the soul starts dissociating itself from the gross world, enabling its consciousness to become aware of the subtle sphere.

== Perfection of consciousness ==
=== Involution ===
When gross impressions become fainter, consciousness starts turning its focus from the apparent outer world inwards. This marks the beginning of its involution. Gradually the thinner gross impressions become subtle impressions, through which the soul experiences the subtle world, and as subtle impressions get exhausted, they become mental impressions, through which the soul experiences the mental world. While doing so, the soul continues to work through its gross medium, seeing, eating, drinking, walking, sleeping, but consciousness is no more entangled with the gross body or world and eventually with the subtle body and world. Finally when mental impressions have been exhausted, consciousness snaps its connection with Illusion and perceives the Soul directly. This course of involution is described as the spiritual path. In traversing it, the soul's consciousness crosses six planes, the seventh being its final liberation from all illusion.

Seven planes of involution according to Meher Baba

The first three planes belong to the subtle sphere, the fourth is on the threshold between the subtle and the mental spheres and the fifth and sixth planes are in the mental sphere. The first plane starts from the threshold of the gross and the subtle sphere. The soul here starts experiencing subtle phenomena simultaneously through its gross and subtle senses. It starts hearing subtle sounds and smelling subtle scents, although their nature is far different from their gross equivalents. Eventually it starts perceiving the subtle world through its subtle body and so comes to the second plane. Here the soul becomes aware of infinite energy and can perform minor miracles, like stopping moving objects or filling dried wells with fresh water. Being not conscious of the gross world its experience gives rise only to subtle impressions of the sights, scents and sounds of the subtle world. Further involution of consciousness makes the soul experience the third plane. Here the soul can use more aspects of the infinite energy by performing greater miracles, such as giving sight to the blind, or restoring maimed limbs.

When consciousness reaches the fourth plane, it finds itself in a particular state. It is fully conscious of the potential of energy and can make full use of it and it also becomes aware of the mental world. This new contact creates very strong desires to make use of this potential. At this point consciousness finds itself in the significant stage of its long development. Not being able to control its feelings or thoughts, the soul is strongly tempted to handle infinite energy. If the infinite potential of this plane is misused, consciousness gets completely disintegrated and the soul finds itself back to the stone-form consciousness and has to start again the long course of evolution from there. If it abstains from using this energy it enters the lower mental plane and if it makes a completely selfless use of it, for the benefit of the spiritual development of others in illusion, it even moves directly to the higher mental plane.

Having abstained from tampering with the energy of the fourth plane, consciousness enters the fifth plane, also described as the lower mental world. This is the inquiring and reflecting state of mind and functions as thoughts mostly. Consciousness on this plane makes one capable of creating or controlling thoughts (but not minds) of gross- or subtle-conscious souls. Although a soul here cannot yet control its feelings or desires, it is safe from making any misuse of its abilities and is no longer conscious of the subtle sphere and can perform no miracles. With more involution consciousness enters the sixth plane, which is the higher mental world. Here the soul is beyond thoughts and is conscious only of feelings. The soul here sees God "face to face" in everything and everywhere, but it cannot yet see God in itself. A soul here can master its feelings and desires completely and governs also the feelings (but not hearts) of gross- and subtle-conscious souls. The longing for union with God, or the Divine Beloved, is here in its most intense expression. Yet the soul cannot bridge this final gap by itself. Only through the grace of a Perfect Master, or Sadguru, can this final union be accomplished. So, in the fifth and sixth planes, predominant is the soul's love for God, as lover of the divine Beloved.

=== States of divine consciousness ===
When the soul has gained self-consciousness, it merges with God in one of three distinct states:

1. Either by dropping immediately all its illusory bodies or by retaining them for some time, yet remaining absolutely unconscious of them, the atma eternally enjoys individualized experience of the infinite power, knowledge and bliss of God, without ever using their attributes.
2. Retaining its gross, subtle and mental bodies and consciousness of them, simultaneously with Self-consciousness, the atma experiences the infinite power, knowledge and bliss of God, as well as God's shadow (gross, subtle and mental worlds of illusion), but does not use their attributes for other atmas whose consciousness is still within these illusory worlds and so it is independent.
3. This state is the same as the previous one, except that the atma uses its infinite power, knowledge and bliss for advancing gross-conscious atmas to subtle consciousness, subtle conscious atmas to mental consciousness and mental-conscious atmas to Self-consciousness. It may even bring gross-conscious atmas directly to Self-consciousness.

Each of these states is an eternal state for the consciousness which has overcome all illusion. Yet from the point of view of souls still within the domain of illusion, they have a sequence in time. Therefore, from its point of view, a God-realized soul first "passes away into God" or "becomes God" (as in state 1), yet outwardly it is in a divine coma, oblivious to the phenomenal world. Most souls in this state soon drop their body. A few souls, however, continue to be in this divine coma for quite a while, until, with the help of other Perfect Masters, they regain consciousness of illusion (as in state 2). They are said to have gone through the "second journey" ("first" being the traversing of the spiritual path, before merging with God). In this state they are "abiding in God" or "they are God". In Sufi terms this state is called Baqaa. According to Meher Baba, at any time on Earth there are always exactly five who have arrived at the final state of "living God's life" (as in state 3) and these are the five Perfect Masters. This state is described as the Man-God state, or in Sufi terms, Qutubiyat. These five Perfect Masters can use their (God's) attributes of infinite power, knowledge and bliss to help others progress on the spiritual path and beyond. When one of the five Perfect Masters drops his body, he is said to "pass-away as God". In Avataric times, there is one additional perfect master who is the descent of God, the Avatar, or God-man, whose work is for the spiritual elevation of all of humanity and everything in creation. "The direct descent of God on Earth as Avatar is that independent status of God when God directly becomes man.*

== History of the writing ==
Meher Baba signing title pages for God Speaks in March 1955

Meher Baba began dictating God Speaks to Eruch Jessawala by way of alphabet board in Dehradun, India in August 1953. Points were dictated to Jessawala every day, who would jot them down and write them out at night. The next day Eruch would read to Baba what he had written. This dictation was continued for several months in Mahabaleshwar and also subsequently at Satara.

Eruch completed his writing work in July 1954.

In October 1954, Baba discarded his alphabet board and began using only hand gestures from then on. The chapter titled "Ten States of God" was written by Eruch Jessawala under the direct supervision of Meher Baba, describing and interpreting an original diagram devised by Meher Baba. It and the Conclusion were written by Jessawala in elaboration of notes, and are a recapitulation of the previous sections dictated directly by Meher Baba.

When dictation of points was completed and Eruch had worked these up to Baba's satisfaction, Feram Workingboxwala and Bhau Kalchuri coordinated the typing of Eruch's handwritten pages. Kalchuri also was partially responsible for dividing the book into chapters.

English author and Meher Baba biographer Charles Purdom was given a copy of the manuscript of God Speaks to edit, but wrote to Baba that it would take him two to three years to edit and prepare the book for publication in England.

Before leaving the "Three Incredible Weeks", on the final day of the sahavas on September 30, 1954, Baba gave American Sufi Lud Dimpfl the manuscript to deliver to Ivy Oneita Duce and Don E. Stevens in America to determine if they could edit the grammar and punctuation and prepare it for printing.

Correspondence began between Baba's sister Mani Irani in India and Ivy Duce in America regarding the preparation and publication of God Speaks. After Ivy Duce and Don Stevens had done their grammar and punctuation work, the manuscript was mailed back to India for Baba to check and correct and add any additional points of interest. Eruch Jessawala and Ramjoo Abdulla did the final corrections and writing work according to Baba's dictates. The Supplement to God Speaks was compiled from Dr. Ghani Munsiff's notes over several years. Ghani was an expert on Sufism and familiar with the various Islamic Sufi cults.

On January 10, 1955, at 4 p.m., Baba broke a fast with rice and dal. During this period, Baba would trace letters with his finger on either a stool or any other convenient surface. But it was very difficult for the mandali to decipher them quickly. Yet Baba was patient and would literally spend hours to convey something. Even if the mandali failed to follow what he meant, Baba would keep repeating it through this "unwritten writing" until they understood. This method of gestures was also used to correct the supplement sections to God Speaks, which Ivy Duce had sent to Baba for his approval in early December 1954.God Speaks was published the following year.

In December 1959, in the mornings, Baba began discussing with Don Stevens publication plans for a new edition of God Speaks. Stevens discussed some questions about various subjects in God Speaks which the Sufis and others had been asking, and Baba promised to elucidate these for the second edition.

In May 1965, Baba checked and corrected a glossary of God Speaks, which Lud Dimpfl had prepared. Bal Natu would read out every word and its meaning and, when required, Baba would correct a point.

Editing of the second edition ended on September 10, 1965. However, it was not released until 1973.

== Editions ==
God Speaks has had three editions. The first edition, published by Dodd, Mead and Company, received four printings, 1955, 1967, 1968, and 1970, and was 255 pages. As early as 1956 Meher Baba began work on a second edition, which was printed posthumously in 1973 and 1975. It was 334 pages. In 1990 the original publisher, Dodd, Mead, went out of business and the plates for the second edition were not preserved. For this reason, the book was retypeset in 1997 and is 313 pages in its current form. Labeled within as the "second edition third printing" the 1997 printing is technically a third edition since it is retypeset, although no major editorial changes were made to the text. The third edition received a second printing in 2010.

God Speaks editions and printings
First Edition (1955)	Second Edition (1973)	1997 Edition (see above)
First Printing 1955	First Printing 1973	First Printing 1997
Second Printing 1967	Second Printing 1975	Second Printing 2010
Third Printing 1968		
Fourth Printing 1970		

There is also an Indian printing edition, published by Meher Mownavani Publishing, India, 2001.

== Reviews ==
In a 1955 review of God Speaks anthropologist Walter Evans-Wentz, the original English translator of The Tibetan Book of the Dead, wrote:

No other Teacher in our own time or in any known past time has so minutely analyzed consciousness as Meher Baba has in God Speaks. Occidental psychology, especially under the illustrious leadership of Dr. [Carl] Jung, has made great advances in the study of the unconscious and of the dream-state, but because of its necessary adherence to conservative methods of scientific research it has not been able, as yet, to fathom the Deep of the Seer. So, for the science circumscribed psychologist, God Speaks should prove to be of paramount importance in inspiring further progress on the psychological pathway.

Correlatively, noteworthy in particular is Part VIII, on the Evolution of Consciousness, and Part IX, on the Ten States of God, to which is attached a diagram linking together "the most generally accepted Sufi, Vedantic and Christian mystical equivalents." As a whole, the book marks clear the at-one-ment of the essentials of the various historic religions in the light of the gnosis of the Sufis.

Meher Baba's enlightening treatise adds much to the sum total of learning and contributes incalculably to the enrichment of mankind for, as the sages of Asia teach, the most intrinsically valuable of all riches, and greater than all mundane wealth, is Right Knowledge.

Nowhere is Meher Baba's wisdom more succinctly set forth than in his Conclusion, on page 176: "To understand the infinite, eternal Reality is NOT the Goal of individualized beings in the Illusion of Creation, because the Reality can never be understood; it is to be realized by conscious experience."

In her 1955 review of God Speaks in The Awakener, Filis Frederick wrote:

This is primarily a book for the mind, in the sense that it requires deep thought and study, and does not appeal so directly to our emotional or devotional side as do Baba's short messages and exhortations to His followers. It is, in essence, a divine cosmology, a Map of the Evolving Universe, in which we all play a part, to help us find the quickest and shortest route home—to our Beloved God, Who Is found, on Realization, to be our very own Self.

== Documentary ==
- The Theme of Creation (2005)
