= Sri Sai Mandir (Belagavi) =

Religion
- Affiliation: Hinduism

Location
- Location: Belagavi
- State: Karnataka
- Country: India

Sri Sai Mandir, also known as Sri Sai Baba Mandir, is a Hindu temple in Belgaum, Karnataka, India. The temple, nestled in a residential area, is dedicated to the teachings of Sai Baba of Shirdi.

== See also ==
- List of Hindu temples in India
