= Perfect Master (Meher Baba) =

Term used by Meher Baba

Perfect Master is a theological concept in Meher Baba's map of consciousness to denote the metaphysical state of a satguru (Vedanta) or a qutub (Sufism) or an Apostle (Christianity). A Perfect Master, according to Baba, is a God-realized person (one whose limited individualized consciousness has merged with God) who can use his Divine attributes of Infinite Power, Knowledge and Bliss for the spiritual upliftment of others.

In describing Meher Baba's specialized use of the term Charles Purdom writes, "The title ‘Perfect Master’ ... means one who has himself reached the goal to which he directs others: one who, pointing to God, has himself realized God."

== States of God-realized souls ==
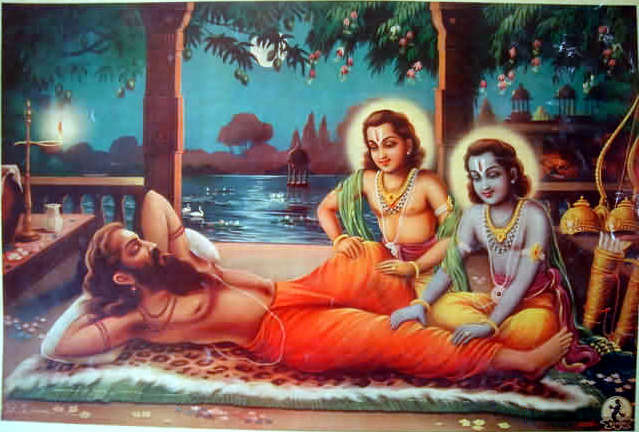
Rama and Lakshmana perform guru-seva by pressing Vishvamitra's feet and legs (bazaar art, mid-1900's)

Limestone relief of John the Baptist from Zakynthos, Byzantine and Christian Museum, Greece.

Meher Baba stated in his book God Speaks that when a spiritually advanced soul loses its consciousness as a separate being, it merges in God in one of three distinct states:

- The soul becomes conscious of itself as God and enjoys eternally His divine attributes of Infinite Power, Knowledge and Bliss, but remains completely unconscious of Creation.
- The soul becomes conscious of itself as God and retains consciousness of Creation but does not use His divine attributes in it.
- The soul becomes conscious of itself as God and uses His divine attributes for the spiritual advancement of others.

Meher Baba calls people who are in the third state "Perfect Masters" or "Mukammil". He distinguishes the second state from Perfect Masters, calling them instead "Perfect Ones" or Kamil. One of the aspects that he says demarcates the Perfect Master from the Perfect One is that the Perfect Master has disciples, while the Perfect One does not. Also Baba says that a Perfect Master can make like himself any number of souls or even the whole of creation, while the Perfect One can only make one soul like himself. However, Meher Baba makes it clear in his system as outlined in God Speaks that the consciousness of these souls is absolutely One and the same. To explain this apparent contradiction he likens the difference between these two classifications of God realized souls to a difference in the 'office' of the God Realized person.

Meher Baba says that at all times on Earth there are 56 incarnate God-realized souls, but that of these only five are deemed the five Perfect Masters of their era. When one of the five Perfect Masters "drops" his physical body, Baba says, another God-realized soul among the 56 incarnate at that time replaces him by taking up that office in that moment. Thus, Meher Baba says there are 56 God-realized souls on Earth at all times, but only and exactly five hold the office of Perfect Master.

In addition, Baba says there is one very rare type of God-realized person who has no disciples but who has duties included in his office. These he says are called Most Perfect Ones or Akmal.

== The Five Perfect Masters ==
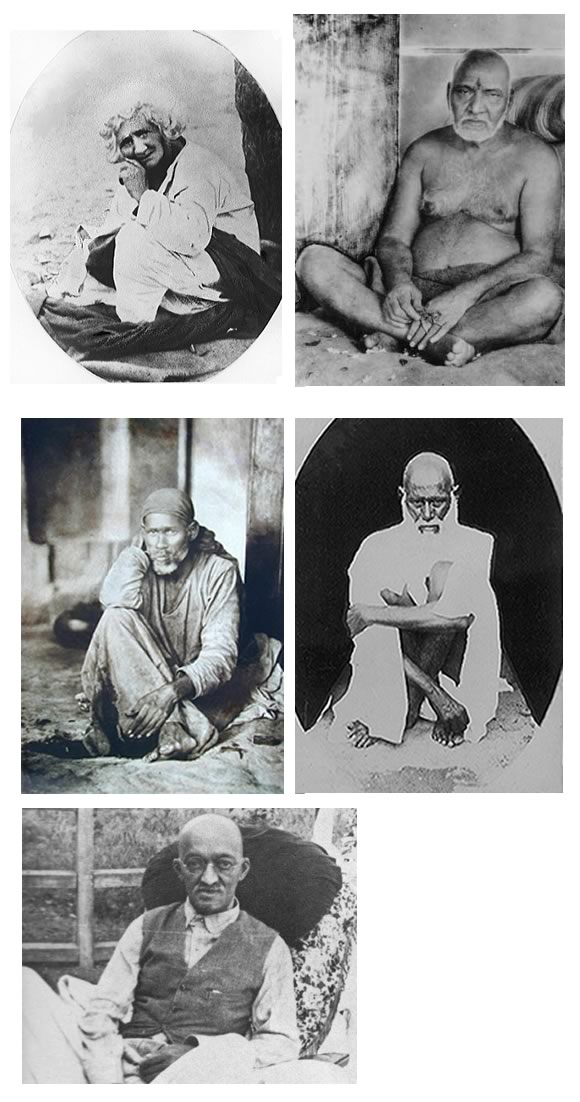
Top: Babajan, Upasni Maharaj. Middle: Sai Baba, Tajuddin Baba. Bottom: Narayan Maharaj.

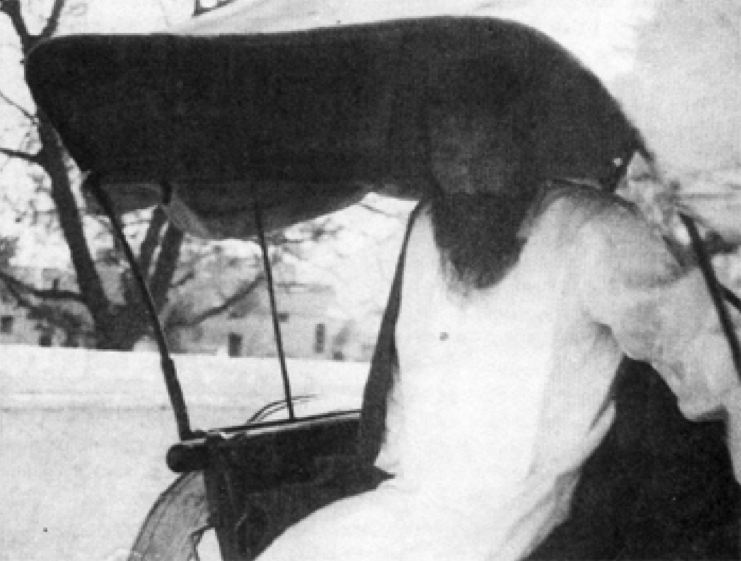
Chacha of Satara in the back of a Tonga after his one and only bath for about thirty years. He is wearing a spotless new Kafni robe. Ajmer, February 1939 A 7th plane majzoob mast.

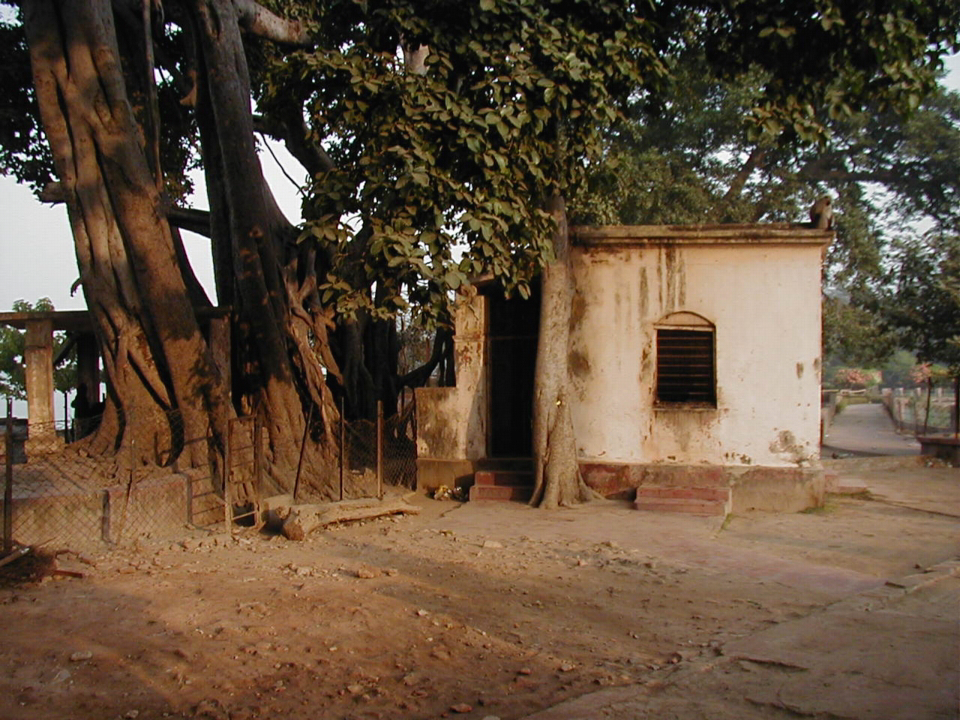
The Panchavati and the hut, where Ramakrishna performed his advaitic sadhana. The mud hut has been replaced by a brick one.

Meher Baba is unique among Indian teachers in that he said that the number of Perfect Masters on the Earth is exactly five at all times. He said further that at the time of his own God-realization the five Perfect Masters were Sai Baba of Shirdi, Upasni Maharaj, Hazrat Babajan, Hazrat Tajuddin Baba and Narayan Maharaj and that these five brought him down to human consciousness as the Avatar on Earth in this cycle of time. "During the Avataric period, the five Perfect Masters make God incarnate as man." He also said, "What I am, what I was, and what I will be as the Ancient One is always due to the five Perfect Masters of the Age. Sai Baba, Upasni Maharaj, Babajan, Tajuddin Baba and Narayan Maharaj - these are the five Perfect Masters of this age for me." All of these have since died and Meher Baba did not say who their replacements were, except to indicate that for the time being they will be in the East. He further indicated that although the 'offices' of the five Perfect Masters are always filled, when they drop their bodies they 'also shed forever their Subtle and Mental vehicles and pass away utterly as God, retaining infinite Individuality and experiencing the Infinite Power, Knowledge and Bliss'.

== The Avatar ==
Meher Baba asserts that beyond the five Perfect Masters of the age, (distinguished as those God-realized souls which fulfill the office of Perfect Master temporarily until they drop their physical bodies), there is also the Avatar. "The number of God-Realized souls on earth is eternally fixed at fifty-six and is never altered, except during Avataric ages when God directly descends as a man." The Avatar, according to Meher Baba, is a special Perfect Master who was the original Perfect Master, or the Ancient One, who never ceases to incarnate in spite of his original attainment of God-realization. Baba says that this particular soul personifies the preserver or sustainer state of God which in Hinduism is called Vishnu and in Sufism is called Parvardigar. According to Meher Baba the Avatar appears on Earth every 700–1400 years, and is brought down into human form by the five Perfect Masters of that age to aid in the process of moving creation in its never-ending journey toward Godhood. He said that in other ages this role was fulfilled by Zoroaster, Rama, Krishna, Gautama Buddha, Jesus, and lastly by Muhammad. "Of the most recognized and much worshiped manifestations of God as Avatar, that of Zoroaster is the earliest – having been before Ram, Krishna, Buddha, Jesus and Muhammad."

== Majzoob ==
Besides Perfect One (Kamil), Most Perfect One (Akmal), and Perfect Master (Mukammil), Meher Baba described one other type of incarnate soul that has transcended the finite ego and merged in a state of God-consciousness, but cannot help others. This type is the Majzoob (Arabic: Absorbed). Unlike the Perfect Master, or any of the other sub-types of God-realized souls, the Majzoob is absorbed in God to such a degree that he cannot be of any direct assistance to anyone else in creation though he can be of indirect help to those who honor him. This is because he is a perfect mast and as such has no experience of the external physical or internal mental worlds. According to Meher Baba the Majzoob has no experience of the gross, subtle, or mental worlds, but is entirely absorbed in the bliss of his state of Godhood.

Sri Aurobindo writes beautifully about the "deep-valley" between seeing God and God Himself. Sri Aurobindo says "We cry out on this side: 'O God, we see You but cannot come to you! So, at least you come to us!' " And God replies, "I always come as Ram, Krishna, Buddha, and others". He was on the sixth plane by the state of meditation according to Meher Baba. The Isha Upanishad is considered to be one of the most important and more accessible writings of Sri Aurobindo. Before he published his final translation and analysis, he wrote ten incomplete commentaries. In a key passage he points out that the Brahman or Absolute is both the Stable and the Moving. "We must see it in eternal and immutable Spirit and in all the changing manifestations of universe and relativity." Sri Aurobindo's biographer K.R.S. Iyengar quotes R.S. Mugali as stating that Sri Aurobindo might have obtained in this Upanishad the thought-seed which later grew into The Life Divine.

== Other Perfect Masters in History ==
Francis of Assisi was an Italian mystic, poet and Catholic friar who founded the religious order of the Franciscans. He was inspired to lead a Christian life of poverty. The fourth gospel of John describes John the Baptist as "a master sent from God" who "was not the light", but "came as a witness, to bear witness to the light, so that through him everyone might believe".

Zar Zari Zar Baksh who is revered as the Master to Sai Baba of Shirdi was the Qutub-e-Irshad, or the highest of the five Qutubs in the spiritual hierarchy of his time, He was a "Master of the Universe" according to Meher Baba's map of consciousness.

Bayazid Bastami was a Zoroastrian mystic and Qutub who dismissed excessive asceticism; but who was also scrupulous about ritual purity, to the point of washing his tongue before chanting God's names. He also appreciated the work of the great jurists.

Mu'in al-Din Chishti is "one of the most outstanding figures in the annals of Islamic mysticism." Muʿīn al-Dīn Chishtī is also notable, according to John Esposito, for having been one of the first major Islamic mystics to formally allow his followers to incorporate the "use of music" in their devotions, liturgies, and hymns to God, which he did in order to make the 'foreign' Arab faith more relatable to the indigenous peoples who had recently entered the religion. Meher Baba cited him to be the "Qutub-e-Irshad" (head of the spiritual hierarchy) of his time.

Ramakrishna elaborates "When I think of the Supreme Being as inactive - neither creating nor preserving nor destroying - I call Him Brahman or Purusha, the Impersonal God. When I think of Him as active - creating, preserving, and destroying - I call Him Sakti or Maya or Prakriti, the Personal God. But the distinction between them does not mean a difference. The Personal and the Impersonal are the same thing, like milk and its whiteness, the diamond and its lustre, the snake and its wriggling motion. It is impossible to conceive of the one without the other. The Divine Mother and Brahman are one."

== See also ==
- Satguru
- Jivanmukta
- Qutub (Sufism)
