= Perfect Master =

The term Perfect Master may refer to:

- the 5th of 33 degrees in Scottish Rite Freemasonry (French: Maître Parfait)
- a title of Jesus in The Church of Jesus Christ of Latter-day Saints.
- a translation of Satguru in Hindu movements and Sant Mat
- a term used in the Divine Light Mission (DLM)
- a term used by Meher Baba. See Perfect Master (Meher Baba)
- George Frayne also known as Commander Cody, was introduced at performances of Commander Cody and His Lost Planet Airmen as "the 29-year old Perfect Master himself, Commander Cody".
- Chinese Zhenren (lit. "true/perfect person") is a Daoist term for an enlightened spiritual master
