= The Theme of Creation =

- DVD cover
- Directed by: Tim Thelen
- Produced by: Tim Thelen; Mindi Thelen; Ken Pellman
- Starring: Meher Baba; Carl W. Ernst; Don Stevens; Bhau Kalchuri; Allan Cohen; Phyllis Ott
- Narrated by: Richard Stermer
- Edited by: Tim Thelen
- Music by: Richard Peikoff; Tim Thelen; Larry Thrasher; Pete Townshend
- Production company: Divine Sport Productions
- Distributed by: Sufism Reoriented
- Release date: 1 February 2005
- Running time: 54 minutes
- Country: United States
- Language: English

The Theme of Creation : An Exploration of Meher Baba's "God Speaks" is a 2005 American documentary film produced, written, edited and directed by Tim Thelen. The film is an analytical exploration of Meher Baba's "God Speaks", and William Donkin's "The Wayfarers", with interviews from religious scholars Carl W. Ernst, Rick Chapman, Allan Cohen, Kendra Crosen Burroughs, Robert Dreyfuss, Charmian Duce Knowles, Bhau Kalchuri, Pascal Kaplan, Phyllis Ott, Tom Riley, Don Stevens, and Adele Wolkin. Tim Thelen adapted, and co-wrote the film with God Speaks editor Don Stevens.

== Archival images taken by ==
- Lud Dimpfl
- Aneece Hassen
- Beheram irani
- Manija Irani
- Charmian Duce Knowles
- Don Stevens
- Jehangir Sukhadwala
- Meelan Studio (Pune)
- NBC-TV / Peter Elgar Productions

== Soundtrack ==
The background score is composed by Richard Peikoff, Tim Thelen, and Larry Thrasher. The track Marty Robbins is written and performed by Pete Townshend, and Eel Pie recording productions 2001.

== Photography ==
- Photographs of Meher Baba prepared by Lawrence Reiter
- Photograph of Charles Darwin copyright of Professor Richard Keynes

== Bibliography ==
- Kenneth Lux. The Love Street Lamppost, July/October 2005
- Cohen, Allan Y. (1977). The Mastery of Consciousness: An Introduction and Guide to Practical Mysticism and Methods of Spiritual Development. San Francisco: Harper & Row. ISBN 0-06-090371-6.
- Evans-Wentz, Walter, "The Uniqueness and Paramount Value of God Speaks", 1955 Book review
