= Sakori =

Village in Maharashtra

- village
- Location in Maharashtra, India Sakori (India)
- Coordinates: 19°43′32″N 74°28′41.18″E
- Country: India
- State: Maharashtra
- District: Ahmednagar
- Elevation: 504 m (1,654 ft)

Languages
  - Official: Marathi
- Time zone: UTC+5:30 (IST)
- PIN: 423107

Sakori or Sakuri is a small village in the Ahmednagar district of Maharashtra State, India, about 5 kilometres (3 mi) south of Shirdi. Sakori is best known as the home of Hindu guru Upasni Maharaj and of his ashram, Kanya Kumari Sthan. It is located at 19°43′32″N 74°28′41.18″E.

== Notable people ==
Upasani Maharaj (1870–1941) lived four years in nearby Shirdi as a disciple of Sai Baba before starting his ashram in Sakori in July 1917. He continued to live in Sakori until his death in 1941.

The master Meher Baba was initiated in Sakori after a seven-year discipleship with Upasni Maharaj that began in 1915 when Upasni was living at Shirdi and continued at Sakori from 1917 to 1922.
