= Upasani Maharaj =

Indian guru (1870–1941)

Upasani
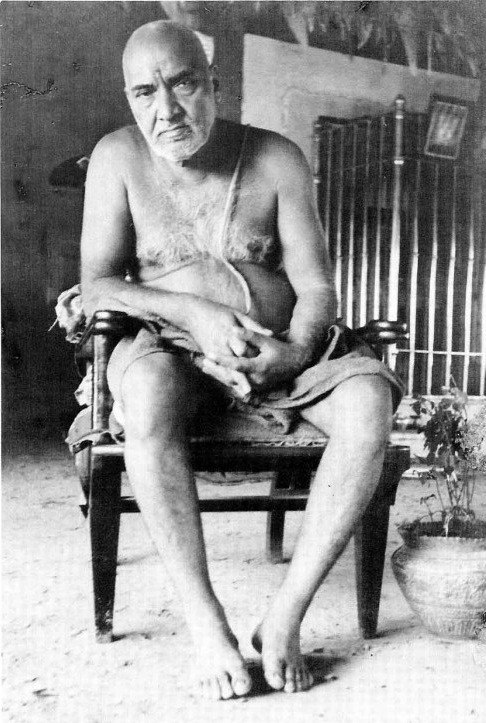
- Born: 15 May 1870; Satana
- Died: 24 December 1941 (aged 71); Ahmednagar district, British India

Philosophical work
- Era: 20th century
- Region: India
- School: Hinduism, Advaita Vedanta

Upasani Maharaj, born Kashinath Govindrao Upasni, (15 May 1870 – 24 December 1941) was an Indian spiritual teacher, considered by his disciples to be a satguru. He lived in Sakori, British India, and is said to have received God-realization from Sai Baba of Shirdi. Upasani himself was one of the principal masters of Meher Baba.

== Early life ==
Kashinath Govind Upasani Shastri, later known as Upasani Baba Maharaj, was born a Hindu into an orthodox Brahmin family in the village of Satana, India, in the Nasik district on 15 May 1870. He was the second child of Govind Shastri and Rukmina. His father was a copyist attached to the legal profession at the civil court of Dhulia; he had moved from Satana, leaving his son under the care of his grandfather and uncle. Kashinath formed a strong bond with his grandfather, Gopala Shastri, a learned Sanskrit scholar with the disposition of an ascetic. Gopala had served as a court advisor on religious and literary matters to Khanderao II Gaekwad, Maharaja of Baroda (rgd. 1856–1870) and to several smaller states. When the Maharaja died in 1870, Gopala lost his position and income, and the family became poor.

Kashinath commenced traditional Brahmin education from the age of five and at the age of eight had his Upanayana (thread-ceremony) at the hands of Deva Mamaledara, a famous saint in the area. He was sent to a vernacular elementary school but did not excel in the non-traditional curriculum taught. He left after three years, following being brutally caned by his teacher. Kashinath was more attracted to stories of the power of mantra (sacred invocation) and tapas (austerities) recorded in the Mahabharata, Ramayana and Puranas than to academic subjects.

Kashinath was clearly influenced by his grandfather's asceticism (following the Ashrama tradition, Gopala later adopted sannyasa) and practiced sadhana (spiritual disciplines) with fervour, both at home and at a nearby cremation ground. Kashinath's introversion became acute. His parents were critical of his extremism, and they nurtured the idea that he was a financial burden to them. Kashinath felt that the only way to resolve the situation was to leave home and adopt a mendicant life, but senior members of the family decided that he should be married. Despite his protests, they arranged his marriage with a girl of eight named Durga. This unwanted match is said to have occurred when Kashinath was fourteen. Within two years of their marriage, his wife died from an illness. He daily requested his parents to give their permission for him to leave, but they were adamant that he should remain a householder, and arranged a second marriage for him. He was sixteen and his bride nine years of age. He began to spend increasing periods of time absent from his home. When at home, he studied books on Ayurvedic medicine. He finally left his wife and relatives on the pretext of the need to earn a livelihood. He went to Pune, but because of his lack of formal education could not find a job. To survive, he had to do menial work or beg. For a period he lived among starving or half starved beggars in the temple of Omkareshwar on the outskirts of Pune.

When he was nineteen, Kashinath returned to his home town of Satana, with the desire of seeing his grandfather again. His journey took him through a thick wood, in the midst of which was a large hill (Bhorgiri fort, near Nasik). High up a precipitous cliff he discerned a small cave, and the desperate thought arose that this would be the ideal place for prayopavesha (fasting to death with full consciousness to attain union with Brahman). He secluded himself in the cave and, after two days of fasting, devoted his time to repeating the sacred syllables of mantras. Over several weeks he entered into altered states of consciousness, finally resulting in a profound samadhi. The life-enhancing spiritual experience gave him hope, and he came out of the cave, but was so weak that he had to slide and crawl down the hill. At the foot of the hill was a small village of Garhwali people, the home of an aboriginal tribe (bhil). For a month he lived on wild grain given to him by his hosts. He felled fuel and sold it at Nasik with them, giving them all the proceeds. He then resumed his journey to Satana and reached it on 22 July 1890.

== Career ==
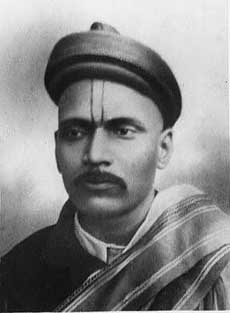
Kashinath Govind Shastri in Amaravati, India when he was an Ayurvedic physician circa 1900

Kashinath returned home as a tapavin, one who has endured extreme yogic austerities. He began to follow his usual routine, and resumed his study of Ayurveda, but now to assist his grandfather who was suffering from paralysis. A month after his return, his father was infected by cholera, and died within a day. A year later his grandfather died, leaving the family poor and in debt. For a year, the family was supported by Bal Gangadhar Tilak. During this time (1891), Kashinath's second wife also died, due to post-parturition complications.

Six months later Kashinath married for a third time, but this time to a compatible partner. The deaths in the family and the mounting debts had shocked him into the realization that he must act, and he left for Sangli to study Ayurvedic medicine and Sanskrit grammar. His studies were completed after three years, and he started a dispensary at Amaravati near Nagpur where he practised. During these years he edited a Marathi monthly Ayurvedic journal, Besaj Ratnamala. He was able to advertise the patent medicines that he manufactured, and the business became successful. He became a well-known physician in Ayurvedic circles, and settled both in his profession and marriage. A photo of Kashinath during the period shows him as a professional man with a painted mark of Lord Vishnu on his forehead, typical of a high Brahmin. When he was twenty-nine, a son was born, but within a few months the baby died.

Success had provided prosperity, but Kashinath was still looking to pay off debts and restore the lost family wealth and status. He moved to Gwalior where there arose an opportunity to acquire uncultivated land if one agreed to farm it. During 1906, he invested thousands of rupees and acquired hundreds of acres. He became an estate landlord, but afterwards found that he had made a costly mistake. The estate had been up for purchase because the previous holder could not pay the fixed rental installments as the tenants would not pay, and the forest and other lands would not yield. Within two years Kashinath became entangled in numerous lawsuits resulting in the loss of his lands, his money and his reputation; his health also suffered. Bankrupted, he returned to Amaravati in 1908 to re-establish his medical practice, but he was disillusioned and had lost interest. Eventually, he gave up his practice and closed the dispensary. In April 1910, he and his wife set out on a pilgrimage to visit holy shrines.

== Crisis ==
On their travels the couple went to the Somnath Temple in Prabhas Patan, to Ujjain, and to the Omkareshwar Temple located in the forest on Mandhata. This building housed a black stone lingam six feet high, the primary object of worship. Here Kashinath undertook intensive meditation that may have included yogic breathing regulation techniques. One day, his wife found him lying unconscious. She desperately threw water into his face and he regained consciousness, but not normal breathing. The autonomic function of his lungs had been disrupted and he could only breathe by consciously applying an artificial movement to his stomach. He was constantly gasping for breath. His wife took him to Nagpur, where they sought professional treatment, but the prescribed medicine did not work, and no effective help was available.

He moved to Dhulia to stay with his brother, but the breathing problem became so painful and laborious that, in sheer desperation, he set out alone in search of a yogi who might cure him. In April 1911 he made his way to Rahuri, near Ahmednagar, to visit a yogi known as Kulkarni Maharaj. This man was only able to massage him and administer a relaxing hot water bath, which did not effect a cure. Kulkarni Maharaj attributed the ailment to intensive yogic practices and advised a visit to Sai Baba of Shirdi, whom he described by the Muslim term of aulia (wali). Kashinath reacted negatively to this advice. He had been tutored by his grandfather, a respected Brahmin pundit, had followed Hindu codes of asceticism, and had enjoyed professional and financial success as an Ayurvedic physician in a high caste society: the idea of visiting a Muslim saint for guidance was alien to his worldview.

Rather than visit Shirdi, Kashinath travelled to Bombay in order to see Narayan Maharaj. This Brahmin holy man had an ashram at Kedgaon, Pune District, near Pune, where he had built a temple consecrated to Dattatreya, in which he would daily perform Puja. When Kashinath met Narayan Maharaj in June 1911, the saint made some allusive remarks and said there was no further need for any contact between them. Kashinath departed in frustration, and returned to Kulkarni Maharaj at Rahuri. The yogi again urged him to meet Sai Baba, proffering his opinion that Sai Baba was above creed and caste, and in no way inferior to Narayan Maharaj. This time Kashinath set aside his prejudices and proceeded to Shirdi. Before he went, he finally followed the advice of an old physician he previously met, which was to drink water as hot as his tongue could stand and to stop drinking cold water to assist his breathing. He found it beneficial, and followed this practice for the rest of his life.

== Influence of Sai Baba of Shirdi ==
Sai Baba was a faqir and guru, revered by both Hindu and Muslim followers, in Shirdi, a small agricultural village in the Ahmednager district. He never gave spiritual discourses, but told stories or parables on occasion. His language was metaphoric and paradoxical, as was his behaviour. Despite this, he succeeded in creating an atmosphere of reciprocal harmony between the Hindu and Muslim communities in Shirdi. His spiritual charisma, expressed in his movements, words and glances, conveyed a tangible and immediate experience of the sacred.

Kashinath went to Shirdi in late June 1911. He talked to local Hindus who eulogized the saint, but Sai Baba's open use of Muslim teachings and rituals discouraged Upasani from following him. He quickly moved on to visit a Hindu guru at Kopargaon, who, to his dismay, advised him to return to Shirdi. After a week, he was induced to go back. He attended the daily Arti ceremonies and resumed his yogic routine. One day, Sai Baba communicated to devotees that Kashinath needed to stay for four years at Shirdi, and that there was no difference between himself and Kashinath. Sai Baba asked Kashinath to sit quietly in the nearby deserted and dilapidated Khandoba temple. His meditation was not to be based on yoga, but on a rapport with the saint.

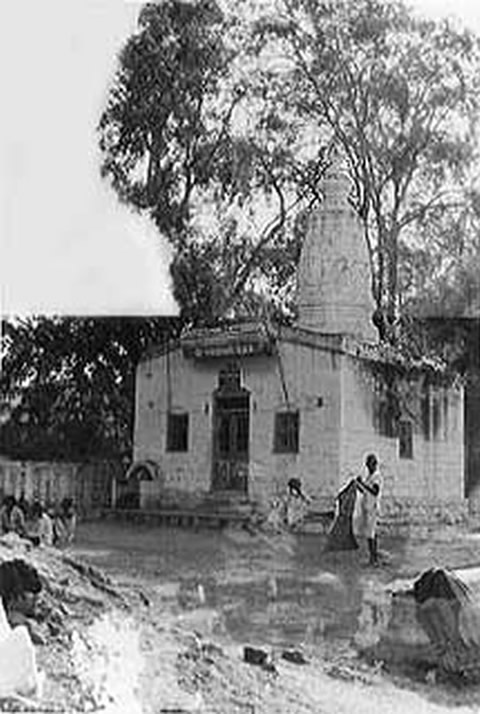
Khandoba Temple, near Shirdi, India

Kashinath followed the instruction for more than a year. He took very little food or fluid and no outdoor exercise, except to attend arti. The small temple was devoid of light, there was an excess of dust and dirt, and scorpions and snakes made their abode in it. Yet in these conditions he was subject to intense altered states of consciousness. Eventually, Kashinath came out of the temple and began to engage in hard menial labour. Alone, he would run a sugar-cane crusher, draw water for a farm, plough a field, and crush stones to small bits. During the year in the temple he had been silent, but now he began to speak. His moods seemed erratic to those who observed him, and some who approached him were abused or even beaten.

In 1913, during Guru Purnima, Sai Baba ordered some persons to go to Kashinath and worship him. He disliked the attention, but since it was Sai Baba's order, he deferred, and allowed devotees to approach him in this manner. It was from this period that Kashinath Govind Upasani Shastri became addressed as Sri Upasani (Baba) Maharaj.

After three years in Shirdi, without anybody's knowledge he left for Sindi, near Nagpur. After a short stay, he journeyed to Nagpur. His food intake had increased, but resulted in severe haemorrhoids. This was treated by the medical procedure of the day— cutting and branding—and at Upasani's request without any anaesthesia. After the operation he went to Kharagpur to recuperate.

For the first four months he remained unknown, but this gradually changed. The West Bengali town had a very mixed ethnic and linguistic population. He gained many Brahmin devotees, but concentrated on assisting the Bhangi caste, sweepers who cleaned the streets and removed the refuse of the houses. He chose to live among the colony of untouchables, in conditions of squalor. His embrace of the role of a sweeper was remarkable for its bridging of the caste divide. This was not the lifestyle of a typical guru, and far removed from his ancestral roots in punditry. His rising fame reached Shirdi, and people came from there to Kharagpur to see him.

Upasani's moods remained erratic in response to the attention he received; he continued to beat and abuse some of those who approached him, for what must have appeared to onlookers as inexplicable reasons. He engaged again in hard menial labour. Now beyond caste distinctions, he cleaned the roads, gutters and latrines, and stayed with Mahar, Mang, and Bhangi castes, and other untouchables. He lay at rest by a dust bin; sometimes he bathed in gutter water, and drank it; he would bathe and wash the clothes of a leper, and drink the washings; he would put a piece of dung in his mouth in the same way as he would a morsel of rich food. He was usually naked; occasionally he would wear a piece of gunny sack, for which he became noted.

During this time, hundreds approached him for his Darshan, worship and advice; many religious festivals were celebrated by the local public under his direction. Then, in 1915, he suddenly left Kharagpur, first going to Nagpur, and thence returned to Shirdi. Upasani Maharaj had become known as Sai Baba's spiritual heir or chief disciple, and his fame spread. Some of Sai Baba's devotees became jealous and sought to cause him trouble. Upasani was forced to leave Shirdi to undertake a second operation for haemorrhoids, and after recovering he chose not to return to Shirdi. He travelled to several places in India where he gave discourses on spiritual subjects. When the tension with the ill-disposed devotees had eased, Upasani returned to Shirdi to reside once again at the Khandoba temple.

== Sakori Ashram ==
In 1917 a group of farmers from the village of Sakori, near Shirdi, invited Upasani to live among them. They constructed a hut at the edge of the village, near the cremation ground. Sakori became a permanent ashram for Upasani Maharaj's work and helped dispel the resentment of the devotees who had reacted to the suggestion he was Sai Baba's spiritual heir. At Sakori Upasani Maharaj remained a renunciate. He did not wear the ochre robe of a sannyasin, but instead favoured common gunny cloth. He was not a member of any religious sect, and remained independent. Upasani was unpredictable in his behaviour towards those who approached him, but consistent in his distinctive discourses, many of which were recorded in the 1920s.

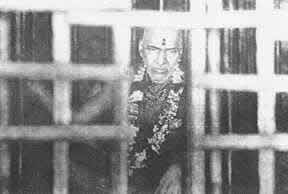
Upasani Maharaj inside the cage he built for himself circa 1922

In 1922 Upasani erected a bamboo cage without any outlet, and confined himself in it. The cage extended over an area barely enough for a man to lie down. He ate (mainly bhakri and chutney), urinated and defecated, and took baths all within the narrow confines of the cage. The devotees kept the cage as clean as possible and attended to his needs from outside. Arti was performed daily to him, followed by devotional songs by the virgin girls who had become his kanyas – nuns. He remained in the cage for over 14 months. Eventually, he asked his devotees to make a door, and began to come out and sit for short periods; a year later, he began to stay outside for longer periods. The reason Upasani gave for his self-confinement was to teach his devotees service.

“I made this cage and I am sitting in it. Now, on finding that no personal service is possible (Upasni did not want people to serve him: ‘You people try to serve me; but I do not like it.’), those that want to serve should take something as belonging to here and do the service; for example, Baba's garden, Baba's temple, Baba's animals, and so on. This is the customary way to serve a saint."

During this period, Upasani began to deliver daily spiritual discourses, which went on for hours. These talks continued both from within and outside of the cage for a period of nearly five years, and attracted devotees from increasing distances. The story of his life produced by a well-known writer, Madhav Nath, spread his fame. In 1923, Upasani's lectures began to appear in a Marathi monthly called Sai Vak Sudha, and were later published in book form under the title Upasani Vak Sudha. Others of his discourses were published under the title The Unpublished Talks of Upasni Baba. A third book dealing with the duties and role of women in society bears the title Sati Charitra (The Character of a Wife). This led to an increase in his popularity, and new buildings were built at the ashram in Sakori.

== Meeting with Mahatma Gandhi ==
Upasani's influence continued to broaden; he had devotees throughout India and had a great effect on Hindu contemporary culture and the country's social and political leaders. Mahatma Gandhi read the newly published Gujarati biography of Upasani and later went to Sakori to investigate. At most Hindu ashrams Gandhi would have been ceremoniously greeted as a great celebrity, his patronage deemed a blessing, but Upasni showed great annoyance, and used abusive language towards the visitor. Upasani was wearing his gunny cloth when Gandhi arrived, but he removed it and went stark naked. He had a tendency to do this, particularly when annoyed by the demands of social etiquette imposed by caste Hinduism. The gesture was lost on Gandhi, who at that time still defended the Caste system, and who in 1921 had written that the Hindu prohibition against intermarriage and interdining is essential for the rapid evolution of the soul. Gandhi's subsequent experiences and reflections led him to annul this orthodox belief in November 1932, when he described the same two prohibitions as weakening Hindu society.

== Kanya Kumari Sthan ==
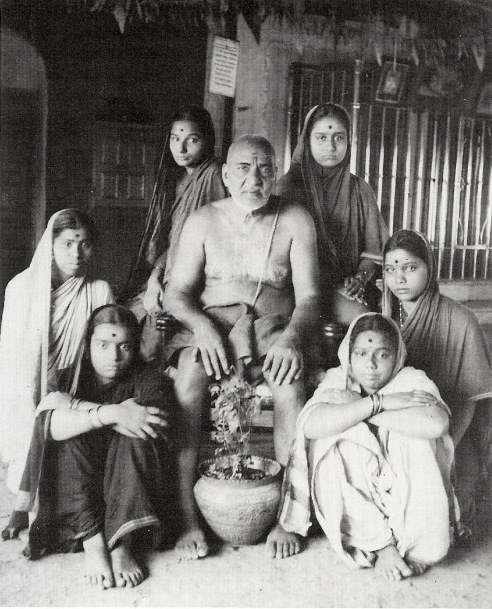
Upasani Maharaj in the 1930s, seated with his kanyas (nuns)

In later years Upasani traveled extensively in India, meeting devotees and giving public spiritual discourses. He was a traditionalist, yet in some respects his outlook was modern. He worked to raise the status of women in society. He believed that they should all be educated, though stressed religious rather than secular education.

The major feature of Upasani Maharaj's later years was the creation of a unique institution at Sakori. This was a community of nuns (kanyas) known as the Upasni Kanya Kumari Sthan. The word kanya is sometimes translated as “virgin”. The word kumari means young woman. The word sthan means “abode”. The meaning that Upasani himself gave to the phrase kanya kumari was that of a virgin or nun who destroys untruth and leads others to Brahman. The nuns received training in Sanskrit, bramanical methods of memorizing and reciting sacred scriptures such as the Vedas and Upanishads, and performing religious ceremonies. The Sthan was a revival of the time during the Vedic era when women took a leading role in the spiritual and intellectual life of India. This was a departure from the orthodox customs of the day that excluded women from religious rites. Initially, the girls were dedicated to Upasani Maharaj's ashram. Following the passage of the Devadasi Abolition Act, which made it illegal to dedicate girls to Hindu temples, girls offered to the Sakori ashram were taken in marriage by Upasani. This was a spiritual marriage, that involved uniting with the divine through the medium of the Guru. It initially involved two girls, and later extended to six. It included Godavari Mataji (1914-1990), who became the leader of the growing community after Upasni's death.

The marriages caused consternation among the general public. Articles appeared in magazines and newspapers, and various civil suits and a criminal cases against Upasani arose, but in all these the court declared him innocent. He was charged with an offence under the Devadasi Act and convicted in the first Court, but acquitted on appeal. The controversy led to a decline in his popularity.

== Teachings ==
The principal teachings of Upasani Maharaj have often been reduced to three rules that, "if observed sincerely, lead to a life worth living":

1. Not to trouble anybody in the least.
2. To suffer for and be useful to others.
3. To remain contented in a state of Be as it may.

The full range and context of Upasani's teachings can be found in The Talks of Sadguru Upasani Baba Maharaj, comprising 4 volumes.

The character and teachings of Upasani Maharaj have been described as paradoxical. Though he talked about spiritual matters, his language was often coarse, even vulgar. Apparently minor transgressions from devotees could provoke angry outbursts, in which he would beat or throw stones at them, and yet in the next moment he would shower them with love and affection. His numerous discourses covered a wide range of metaphysical subjects, but his language was always that of the common people. Yet the ‘language’ of Upasni Maharaj required that the listener adapt to something other than words:

My talk is not in accordance with the method of exposition as laid down by the Shastra. My physical body is crooked; so is my hut; my language also is rough and unpolished. If you want to derive some benefit from here you have to behave to suit this place. Remember the saying "When you go to Rome, behave as a Roman does". Whenever you go to any place you have to adapt yourself to that place, otherwise you are not able to derive full benefit from it; the people over there would not be free with you. When you go to a place of God or to that of a Sat-purusha, you have to maintain both external and internal purity; your reasoning must be straightforward; your whole behaviour has to be virtuous to suit that place; your actions and movements must be suitably adjusted; then alone you are able to achieve your object.

Upasani Maharaj has been described as the living embodiment of the Ashtavakra Gita. Of himself, he declared:

I am the Ancient One. I am in the Beyond-State, beyond Duality and Non-duality. I am in the world, but not of it. Because I have to behave like a man of the world, do not misunderstand me. I experience simultaneously the World-state and the God-state. I live eternally in the state of divine-consciousness. I am everything.

== Death ==
Upasani's last years were filled with extensive travel, meeting his devotees scattered about the country, teaching the kanyas in the ashram, and supervising the construction and dedication of shrines and temples made possible through the gifts of his followers. The last of these was in Satana in 1941, where a temple was constructed in honor of his birth there. When construction was nearing completion, Upasani pressed the workmen to finish soon, saying "The sun is setting … The sun is setting." The temple was constructed at the spot formerly occupied by his own home. He returned exhausted to Sakori on the twenty-third of December. On the 24th of December 1941, at 71 years of age, Upasani Baba Maharaj dropped the body and entered Mahāsamādhi.

== Master to Meher Baba ==
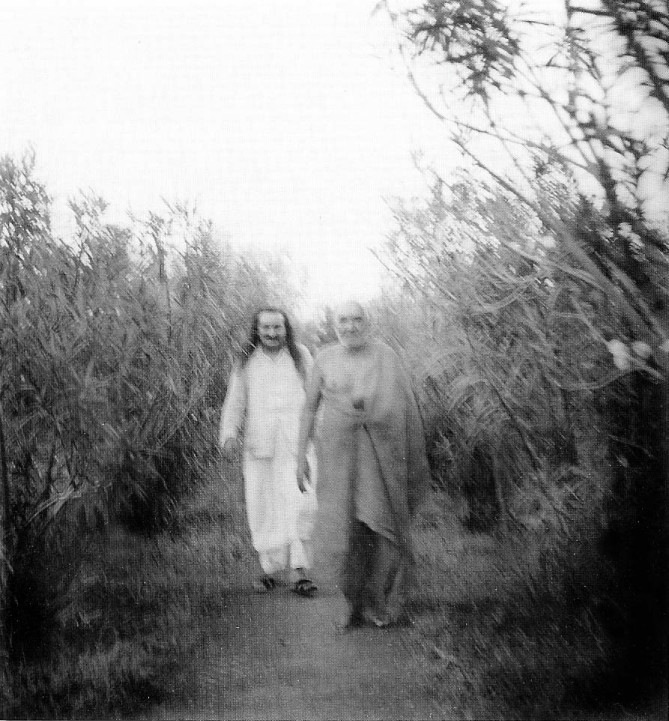
Final meeting with Meher Baba on 17 October 1941

Upasani Maharaj was one of the principal teachers of Meher Baba. Meher Baba first met Upasani in 1915 when Upasani was staying in Shirdi with Sai Baba.

Upasani moved to Sakori in July 1917 and Meher Baba frequently stayed there. According to Meher Baba, who had received God-realization in January 1914 from Hazrat Babajan, Upasni Maharaj gave him knowledge of the divine. Charles Purdom recounts that, at the end of December 1921, Upasani made several comments relating to Meher Baba. He said to his disciples: "I have given my charge to Meherwanji. He is the holder of my key." Some time later he said "This boy will move the world. Humanity at large will be benefited at his hands." A few days later he sent for Gustadji Hansotia, one of his leading disciples, and told him "I have made Meherwanji perfect. He is the Sadguru of this Age. Now you have to leave me and stick to him." To Behramji he said, "Your friend is God-realized; carry out every command and every desire of his." Finally, one night he folded his hands and said, "Meherwanji, you are adi-shakti: you are Avatar."

After a separation of nearly 20 years, Meher Baba and Upasani Maharaj met for the last time on 17 October 1941 in Dahigaon, a small village in Niphad taluka in the Nashik district of Maharashtra, just two months before Upasni's death.
