= Sahavasa =

Sanskrit term for cohabitation

Sahavasa (Sanskrit: सहवास, romanized: sahavāsa) is a Sanskrit term literally meaning dwelling together or a close companionship. It may also refer to a spiritual retreat or a gathering held by a guru or master so that his devotees may enjoy his company, i.e., his physical presence, or a gathering in his honor where his followers meet to remember him.

== See also ==
- Ashram
- Darshan
