= Narayan Maharaj =

Indian spiritual master (1885–1945)

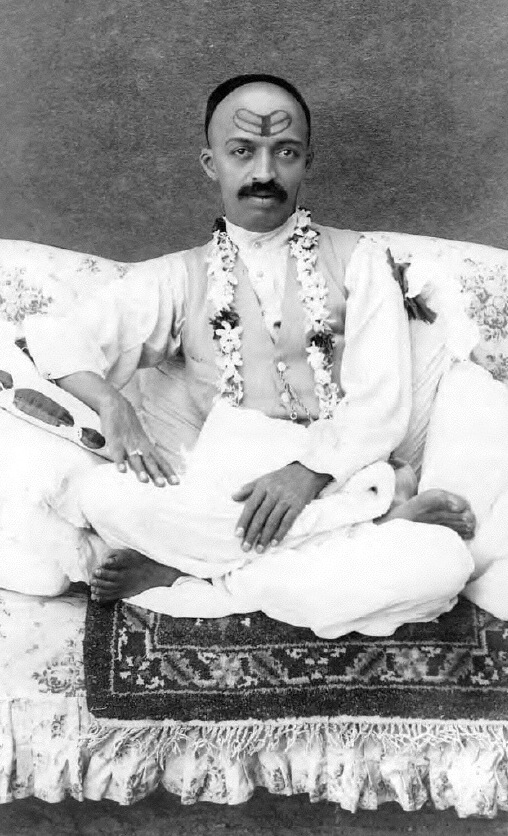
- Born: 20 May 1885; Bagalkot, India
- Died: 3 September 1945 (aged 60); Bangalore, India

Philosophical work
- Era: 20th century
- Region: India
- School: Hinduism

Narayan Maharaj (20 May 1885 – 3 September 1945) was a Hindu Indian spiritual master considered by his followers to be a sadguru. He lived in the village of Kedgaon, east of the Indian city of Pune.

== Early life ==
Narayan was born in a Deshastha Brahmin family in Nargund in the Indian state of Karnataka. His father died when he was just 14 months old and his mother when he was four. He was then cared for by his grandmother. He soon left home due to family quarrels, eventually seeking solitude in a Shiva temple. Later, on the advice of a saint, he went to Gangapur for about 10 months, and achieved enlightenment.

As a sadguru he traveled to many religious places including Varanasi, Kedarnath, Badrinath, Nepal, Omkareshwar, Mahakaleshwar, Rameshwar, Madurai, Chidambaram, Kanchipuram, Tirupathi, Ramakrishna Ashram, Calcutta, Bangalore, Mysore, Dwarka, Somnath and Mahabaleshwar.

== Views and influence ==
Narayan often dressed lavishly and lived in a palace; he even had a silver throne. However, it is said that he was unselfish and that his compound gave continually to the poor. His motto was "Treat every one as God."

Meher Baba contacted Narayan Maharaj in 1915 in his youth and later said that Narayan was one of the Five Perfect Masters of his time.

Narayan's samadhi (tomb shrine) is in Bangalore, India. From 1942 onward, he was seen having frequent health problems and he decided to move to Ottacmond Ooty of Tamil Nadu. Finally, he came to Bangalore where he desired to perform an Ati Rudra Swahakar to Lord Mallikarjuna. Lavish arrangements were made by the State of Mysore for this occasion, and it was attended by nearly 100,000 people. After the Maha Pooja, he gave a mantra to the devotees present, and retired to his chamber and sat in Padmasana and left his physical body, on 3 September 1945. When Maharaj dropped his body the State of Mysore provided an aircraft for his body to be taken to Bet, but later it was decided to provide nearly two acres of beautiful land near Kempambudi Lake at Bangalore where his mortal remains are kept at a Samadhi. Sri Bet Narayan Maharaj ashram and Brindavan are located in Gavi Gangadhareshwara circle.
