= Sai Baba of Shirdi =

Hindu and Muslim saint (c. 1838–1918)

Sai Baba
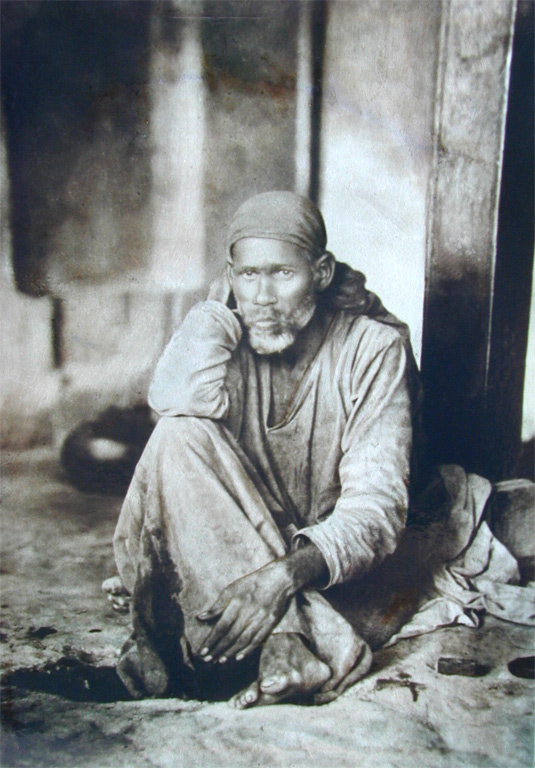
- Sai Baba (sitting near Dhuni in Dwarkamai circa 1903)

Personal life
- Born: c. 1838
- Died: 15 October 1918 Shirdi, Bombay Presidency, British India
- Resting place: Samadhi Mandir, Shirdi
- Website: sai.org.in

Religious life
- Temple: Sai Baba's Samadhi Mandir, Shirdi

Sai Baba of Shirdi (c. 1838–15 October 1918), also known as Shirdi Sai Baba, was an Indian spiritual master considered to be a saint, and revered by both Hindu and Muslim devotees during and after his lifetime.

According to accounts from his life, Sai Baba preached the importance of "realisation of the self" and criticised "love towards perishable things". His teachings concentrated on a moral code of love, forgiveness, helping others, charity, contentment, inner peace, and devotion to God and Guru.

Sai Baba condemned discrimination based on religion or caste. He had both Hindu and Muslim followers, but when pressed on his own religious affiliations, he refused to identify himself with one to the exclusion of the other. His teachings combined elements of Hinduism and Islam: he gave the Hindu name Dwarakamayi to the mosque in which he lived, practised both Hindu and Muslim rituals, and taught using words and figures that drew from both traditions. According to the Shri Sai Satcharita, a hagiography written shortly after his death, his Hindu devotees believed him to be an incarnation of the Hindu deity Dattatreya.

== Biography ==
Most information about Shirdi Sai Baba comes from the Śrī Sāī Saccarita written by G.R. Dabholkar in Marathi (1859-1929). Dabholkar's biography was influenced by the Vākarī Sampradāya and the Marathi Gurucaritra by Sarasvatī Gaṅgādhar.

=== Early years ===
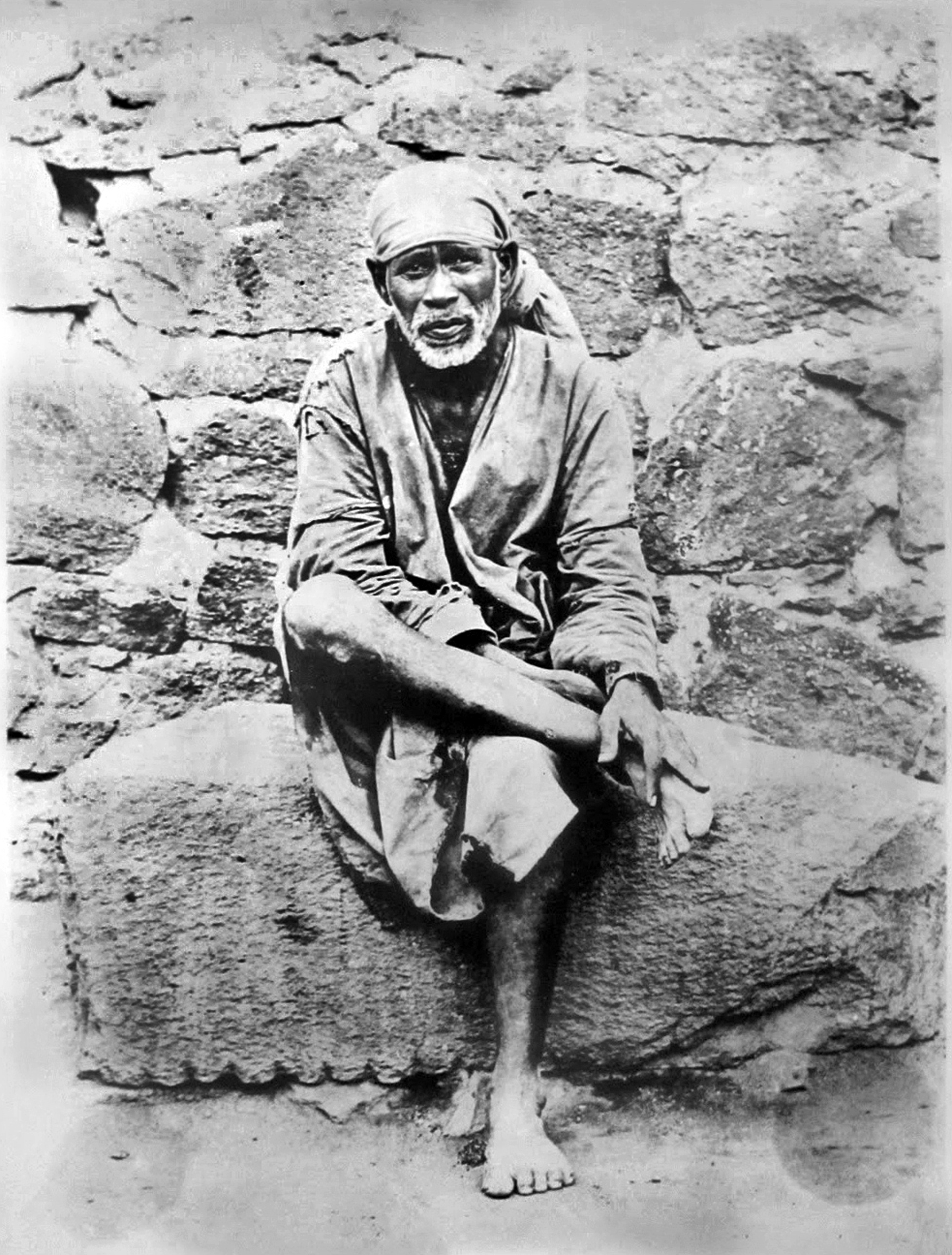
Sai Baba sitting on a stone.

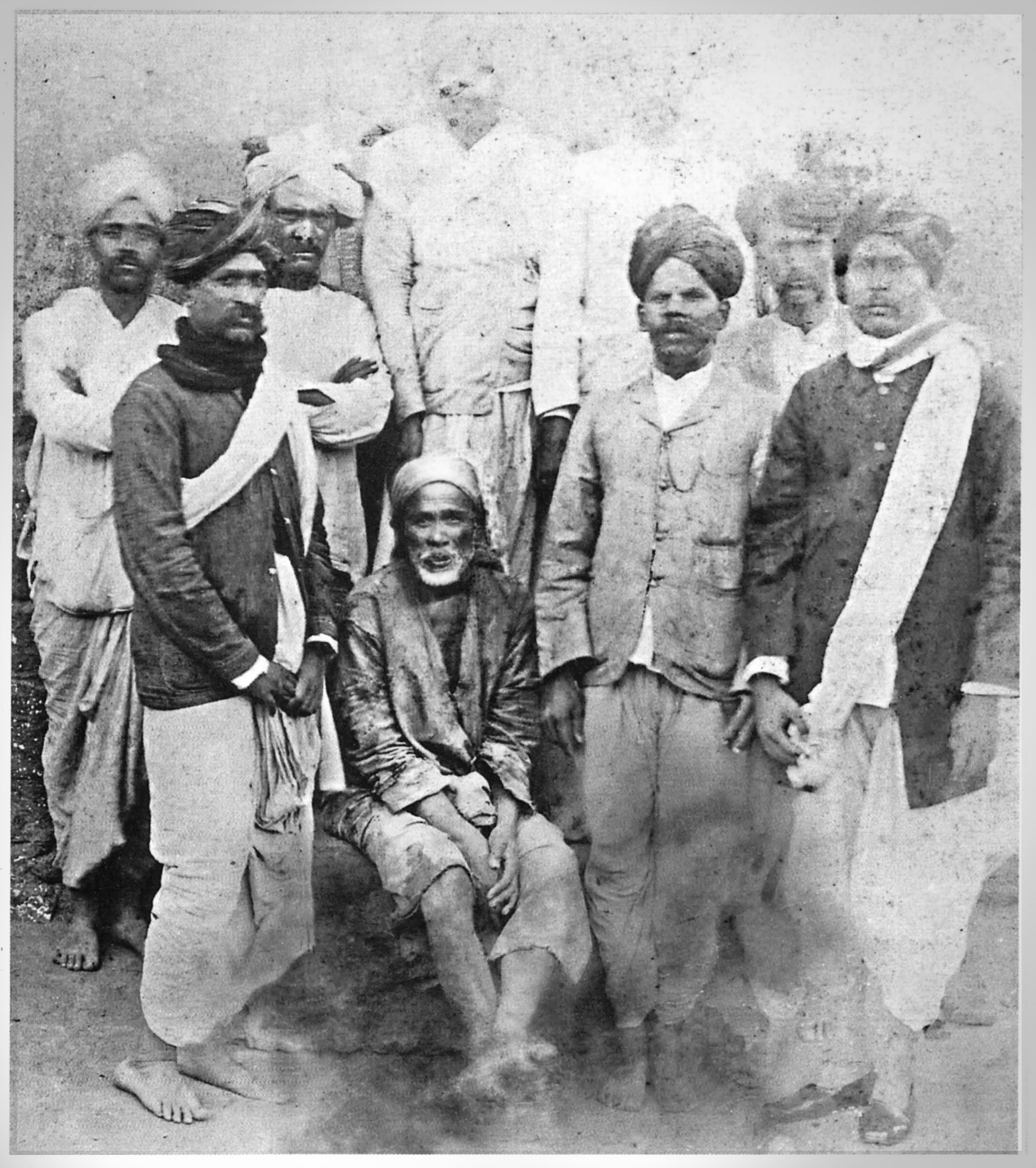
Sai Baba with some devotees

Sai Baba is noted to have been born as a Hindu Brahmin before he was adopted by a Sufi fakeer. However, he himself gave no importance to the questions about his origins. Baba reportedly arrived at the village of Shirdi dressed as a faqīr in the Ahmednagar District of Maharashtra, India, when he was about sixteen years old. Although there is no agreement among biographers about the date of this event, it is generally accepted that Baba stayed in Shirdi for three years, disappeared for a year, and then returned permanently around 1858. This suggests a possible birth year of 1838. He led an ascetic life, sitting motionless under a neem tree and meditating while sitting in an asana. The Sai Satcharita recounts the reaction of the villagers.

The people of the village were wonder-struck to see such a young lad practicing hard penance, not minding heat or cold. By day he associated with no one, by night he was afraid of nobody.

Some of the religiously-inclined villagers (Mahalsapati, Appa Jogle and Kashinatha) visited him regularly. The village children considered him mad and threw stones at him. After some time he left the village and it is unknown where he went or what happened to him. There are some indications that he met with many saints and fakirs and worked as a weaver. He is reported to have said that he fought with the army of Rani Lakshmibai of Jhansi during the Indian Rebellion of 1857.

=== Name ===
Sai Baba's real name is unknown. The name Sai was given to him by the temple priest Mahalsapati when he returned to Shirdi in 1858. The word Sai refers to a religious mendicant but can also mean God. In several Indian and Middle Eastern languages the term Baba is an honorific signifying grandfather, father, old man or sir. Thus Sai Baba denotes "holy father", "saintly father".

=== Return to Shirdi ===
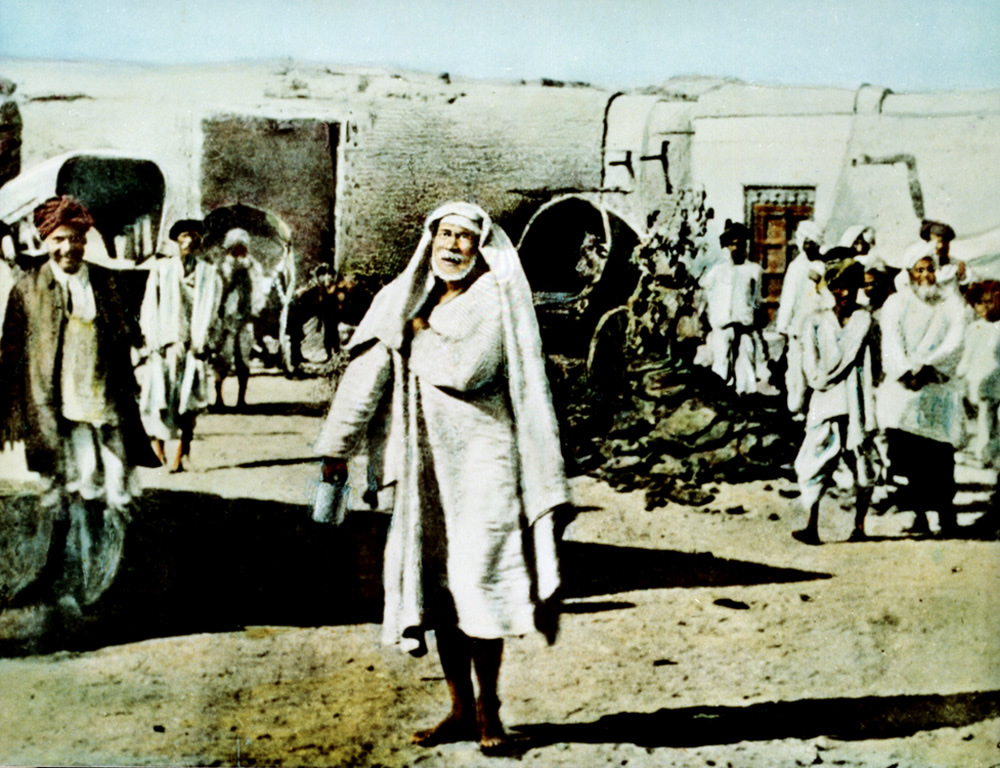
Sai Baba in his usual attire

Around this time Sai Baba adopted the practice of dressing in a knee-length one-piece kafni robe and a cloth cap, articles of typical Sufi clothing. Ramgir Bua, a devotee, testified that Sai Baba was dressed like an athlete and sported 'long hair flowing down to the end of his spine' when he arrived in Shirdi, and that he never had his head shaved. It was only after Baba forfeited a wrestling match with one Mohiddin Tamboli that he took up the kafni and cloth cap. This attire contributed to Baba's identification as a Muslim fakir and was one reason for the initial hostility toward him in a predominantly Hindu village.

For four to five years, Baba lived under a neem tree, and undertook long periods of meditation. His manner was said to be withdrawn and uncommunicative, and he often wandered for long periods in the jungle around Shirdi. He was eventually persuaded to take up residence in an old and dilapidated mosque, where he lived a solitary life, surviving by begging for alms and receiving itinerant Hindu or Muslim visitors. In the mosque, he maintained a sacred fire (dhuni), and gave sacred ash ('Udi') from the fire to guests on their departure. The ash was believed to have healing and apotropaic powers. He performed the function of a local hakim and treated the sick by application of ashes. He delivered spiritual teachings to his visitors, and recommended the reading of the Ramayana and Bhagavat Gita for Hindus and the Qur'an for Muslims. He insisted on the indispensability of the unbroken remembrance of God's name (dhikr), and often expressed himself in a cryptic manner with the use of parables, symbols, and allegories.

Baba is believed to have tended a garden called Lendi Baug, named after a riverlet called Lendi which flowed nearby. The garden still exists; it contains temples (samadhis) commemorating people and animals associated with Baba's life, and continues to be visited by pilgrims.

Some of Shirdi Sai Baba's disciples became well-known spiritual figures and saints, most notably Mahalsapati, a priest of the Khandoba temple in Shirdi, and Upasani Baba Maharaj, who himself became the teacher of Meher Baba. He was revered by other saints as well, such as Bidkar Maharaj, Gagangiri Maharaj, Janakidas Maharaj and Sati Godavari Mataji. Sai Baba referred to several saints as 'my brothers', especially the disciples of Swami Samartha of Akkalkot.

In 1910, Shirdi Sai Baba's fame began to spread in Mumbai. Being regarded as a saint with the power of performing miracles, and even as an avatar, numerous people came to visit him. They built his first temple at Bhivpuri, Karjat.

=== Final years and death (Samadhi) ===
In August 1918, Sai Baba told some of his devotees that he would soon be "leaving his mortal body". Towards the end of September, he had a high fever and stopped eating. As his condition deteriorated, he asked his disciples to recite holy texts to him, although he also continued to meet visitors. He died on 15 October 1918, coinciding with the Vijayadashami festival. His remains were interred at Buti Wada in Shirdi, which later became a place of worship that is known today as Shree Samadhi Mandir or Shirdi Sai Baba Temple.

== Teachings and practices ==
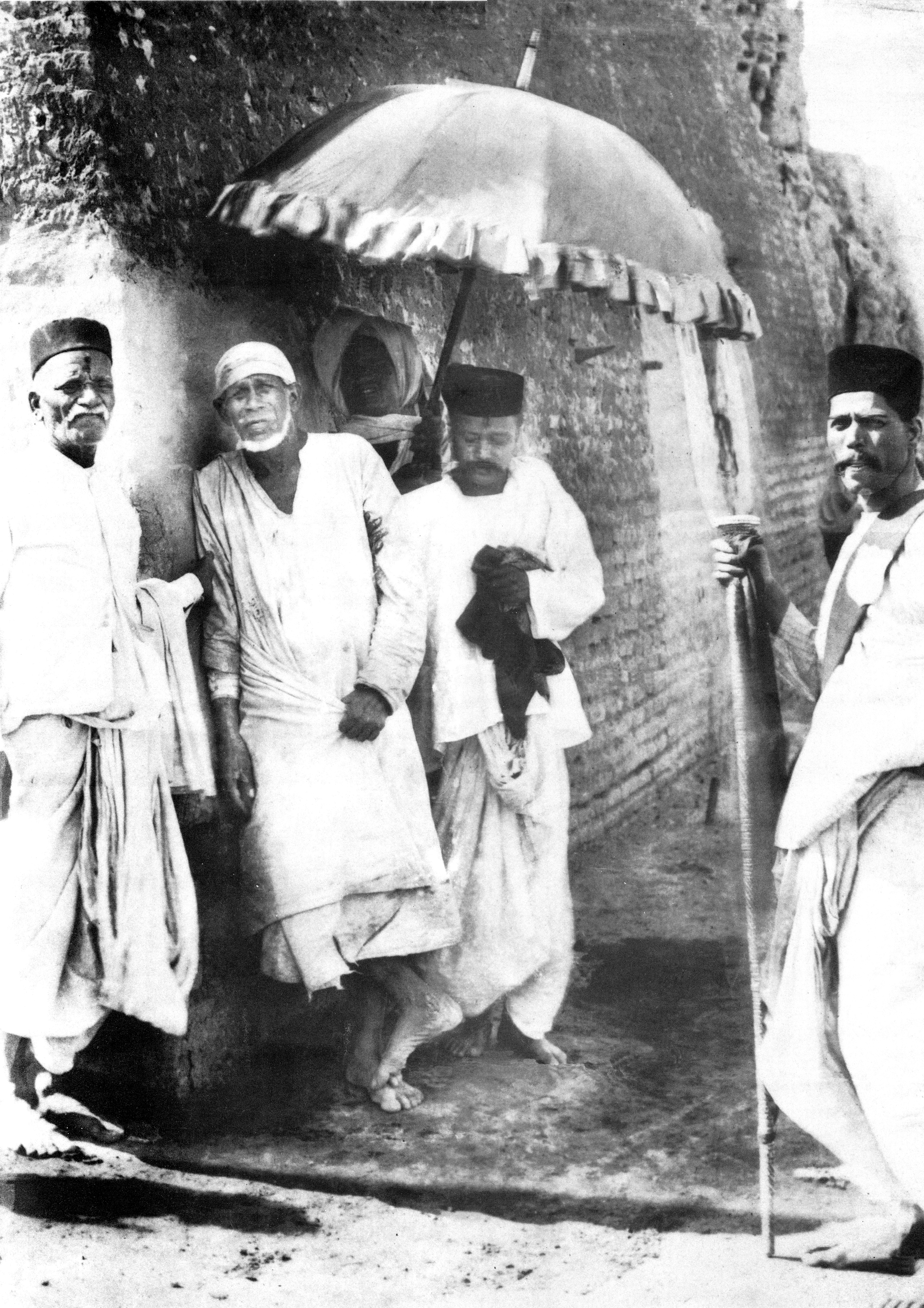
Sai Baba, leaning against the wall of Dwarakamayi, with devotees

Sai Baba opposed all persecution based on religion or caste. He was an opponent of religious orthodoxy – Christian, Hindu, and Muslim.

Sai Baba encouraged his devotees to pray, chant God's name, and read holy scriptures. He advised Muslims to study the Qur'an and Hindus to study texts such as the Ramayana, Bhagavad Gita and Yoga Vasistha. He instructed his devotees and followers to lead a moral life, help others, love every living being without any discrimination, and develop two important features of character: faith (Shraddha) and patience (Saburi). He criticised atheism.

In his teachings, Sai Baba emphasised the importance of performing one's duties without attachment to earthly matters and of being content regardless of the situation. In his personal practice, he observed worship procedures belonging to Islam; although he did not engage in regular rituals, he allowed the practice of Salah, chanting of Al-Fatiha, and Qur'an readings at Muslim festival times. Occasionally reciting the Al-Fatiha, Baba enjoyed listening to mawlid and qawwali accompanied by the tabla and sarangi twice daily.

Sai Baba interpreted the religious texts of both Islam and Hinduism. He explained the meaning of the Hindu scriptures in the spirit of Advaita Vedanta, with a strong emphasis on the path of bhakti (devotion). All three of the main Hindu spiritual paths – Bhakti Yoga, Jnana Yoga, and Karma Yoga – influenced his teachings. Sai Baba encouraged charity and sharing. He said:

Unless there is some relationship or connection, nobody goes anywhere. If any men or creatures come to you, do not discourteously drive them away, but receive them well and treat them with due respect. Sri Hari (God) will certainly be pleased if you give water to the thirsty, bread to the hungry, clothes to the naked, and your verandah to strangers for sitting and resting. If anybody wants any money from you and you are not inclined to give, do not give, but do not bark at him like a dog."

Sai Baba stressed the importance of surrender to the true satguru, who, having trodden the path to divine consciousness, can lead the disciple through the jungle of spiritual growth. True devotees, he said, always meditate upon the satguru with love, and surrender themselves completely to him. When he spoke of himself in this sense he explained his meaning thus:

You need not go anywhere in search of Me. Barring your name and form, there exists in you, as well as in all beings, a sense of Being or Consciousness of Existence. That is ‘Me’. Knowing this, you see Me inside yourself, and in all beings. If you practice this, you will realize all-pervasiveness and thus be as one with Me.

=== Worship and devotees ===
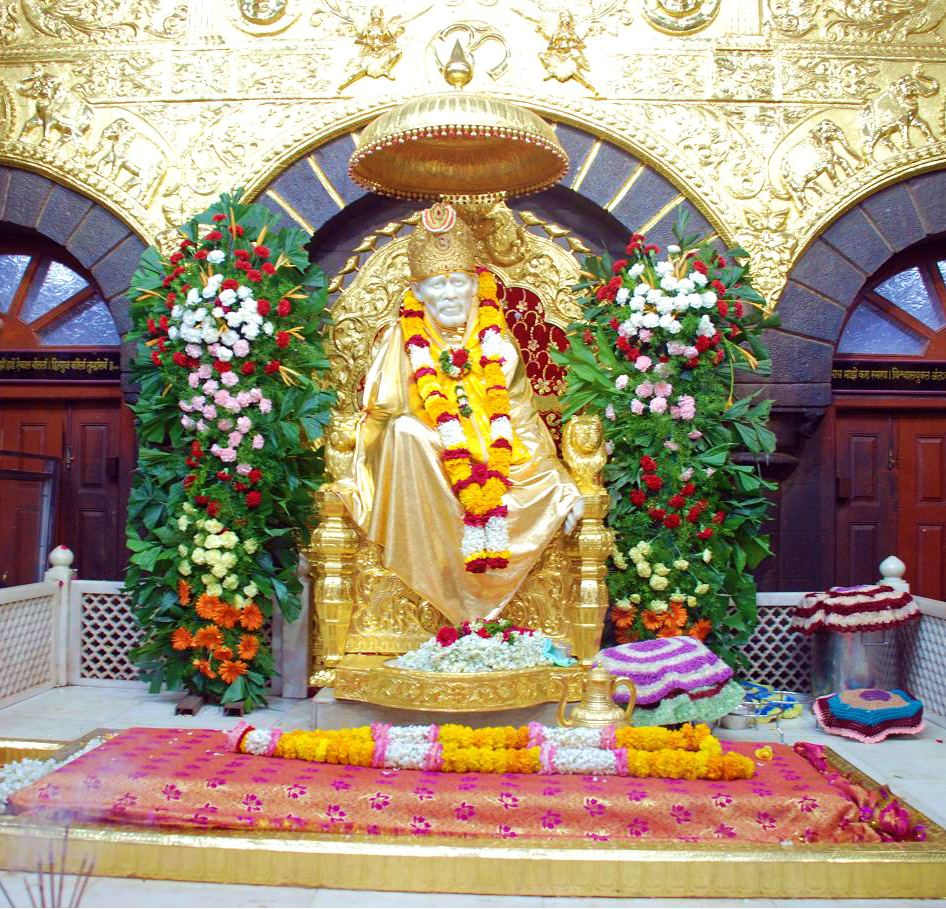
Sai Baba's Temple in Shirdi

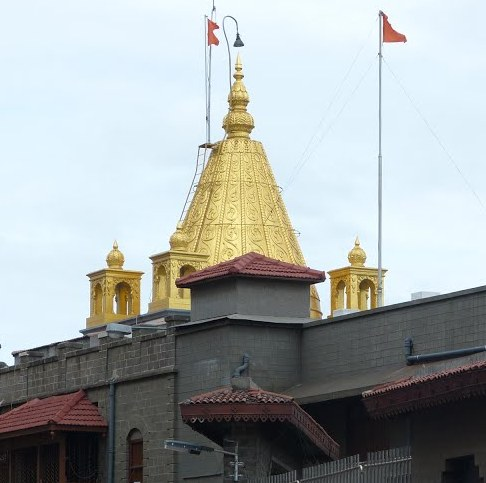
The Mandir Kalasha Of The Samadhi Mandir, Shirdi

A local Khandoba priest, Mahalsapati Nagre, is believed to have been Sai Baba's first devotee. In the 19th century, Sai Baba's followers were only a small group of inhabitants of Shirdi and a few people from other parts of India.

Today, because of Sai Baba, Shirdi has become a famous religious tourist destination in India and is counted as one of the most popular Hindu places of pilgrimage. The first Sai Baba temple is situated at Kudal, Sindhudurg. This temple was built in 1922.

The Sai Baba Temple in Shirdi is visited by an average of 25,000 pilgrims a day. During religious festivals, this number can reach up to 100,000. Both the interior of the temple and the exterior cone are covered with gold. Inside the temple, the statue of Sai Baba is carved out of Italian marble and is seen draped with royal cloth, wearing a gold crown and adorned with fresh flower garlands. The temple is managed by the Shri Sai Baba Sansthan Trust.

Following rituals and traditions dating back to when Baba was still alive, four aartis are held daily (corresponding to the time of the day) inside the Samadhi Mandir.

- Kakad Aarti (The Morning Aarti) at 04:30
- Madhyan Aarti (The Afternoon Aarti) at 12:00
- Dhup Aarti (The Evening Aarti) at 18:30
- Shej Aarti (The Night Aarti) at 22:30

The Palanquin procession of Sai Baba takes place every Thursday from the Samadhi Mandir to Dwarkamayi, onward to Chavdi and back to the Sai Baba Mandir. Devotees belonging to all faiths are welcome to take Darshan in the Samadhi Mandir and have free meals in the Prasadalaya, irrespective of caste, creed, and religion.

Sai Baba of Shirdi is especially revered and worshiped in the states of Maharashtra, Odisha, Andhra Pradesh, Telangana, Karnataka, Tamil Nadu, and Gujarat.

In recent years, the following of Sai Baba has spread to the Netherlands, the Caribbean, Nepal, Canada, United States, Australia, United Arab Emirates, Malaysia, United Kingdom, Germany, France, and Singapore, due to the Hindu Indian Diaspora in those countries.

=== Hindus and Muslims ===
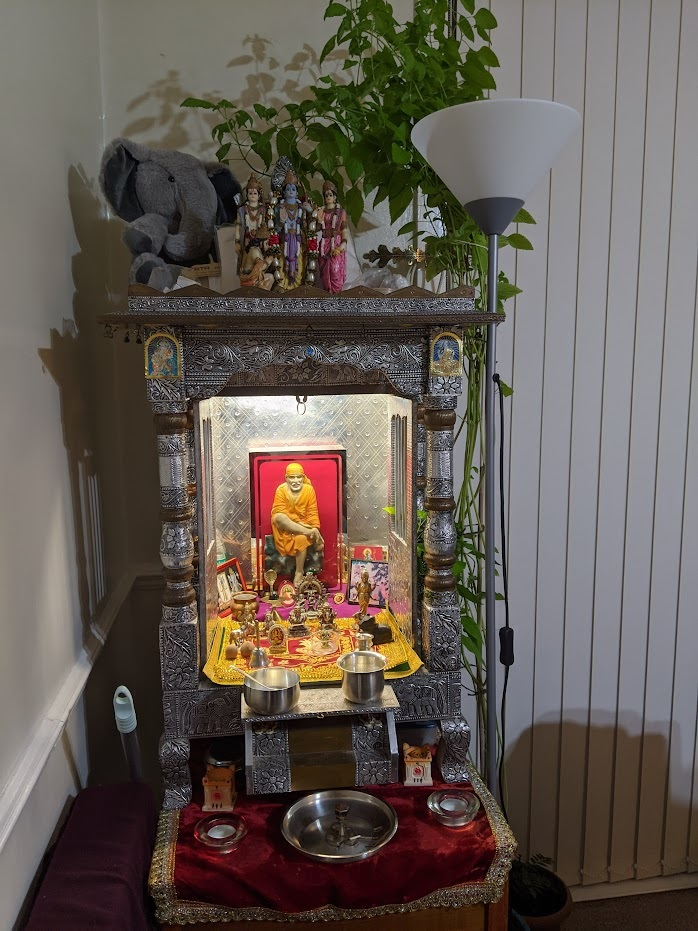
A household shrine (Deoghar) in a Hindu Marathi family with Saibaba at the center

In a verse of the midday arti, devotees sing:

In essence, there is no difference whatever between Hindu and Muslim. You took birth in human body to show this. You look with affection on both Hindus and Muslims. This, Sai, who pervades all, as the soul of all, demonstrates.

Baba often talked about the Hindu gods and quoted from sacred texts. On occasion he would comment on passages from the Bhagavad Gita, the Isha Upanishad, and others. The names of Krishna and Rama were sacred to him. With Muslim followers, he talked of Allah and the Qur'an, often quoting Persian verses. He frequently used the expression "Allah rakhega vaiia rahena" ("Let us be content with what we have, and submit our will to Allah"). He told his listeners that he, like them, was but a devotee of Allah, a humble faqir with two arms and two legs. In later years, Parsis and Christians would also visit him in Shirdi. He respected all faiths, and taught that all are particular paths toward one ineffable goal.

His notion of the unity of all mankind was congruous with both Advaitism and Sufism. "God being one and the master of all also meant that all his creatures were part of one big family," writes Sikand. "This belief was entirely in keeping with both the Bhakti philosophy as well as the teachings of the Sufis, who believed that the light of God exists in every creature, indeed in every particle of His creation." For Sai Baba, it is commonly believed that he viewed all religious paths as being equally valid, with him considering "Ishwar" (the Hindu God) and "Allah" to be synonymous. People coming to his abode were so taken aback to see Hindus, Muslims, and others living together so peacefully that in many instances it proved to be life-changing.

== Followers ==
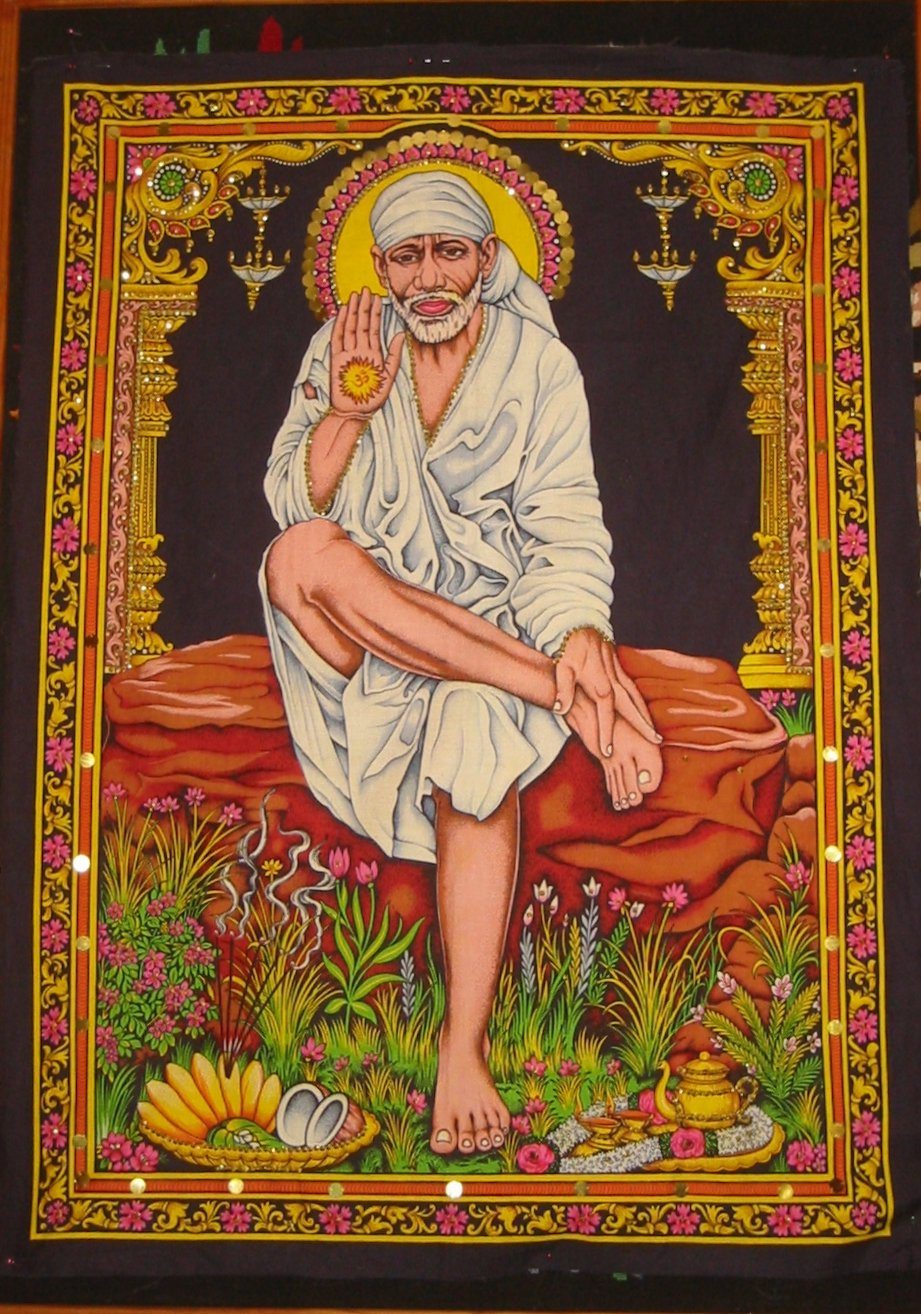
Sai Baba depicted on a tapestry

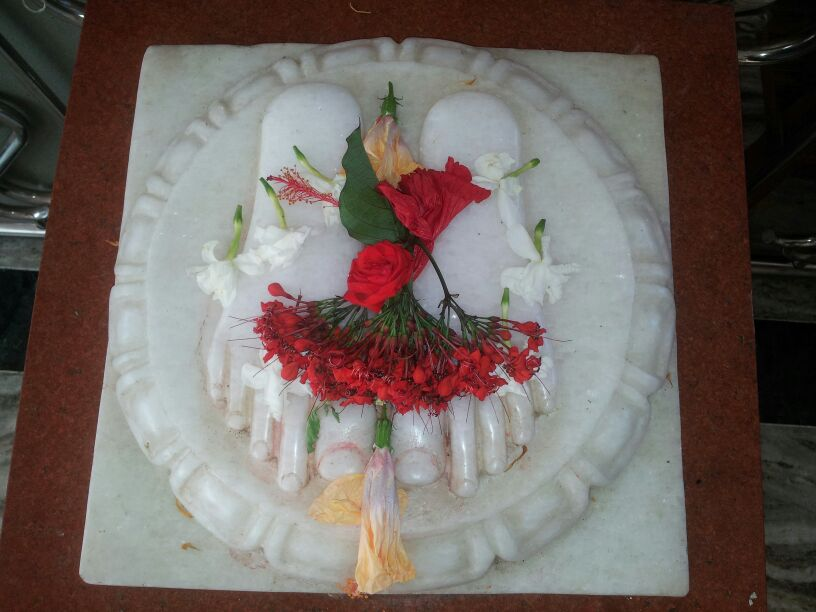
Padukas of Sai Baba

Shirdi Sai Baba left behind no spiritual heirs, appointed no disciples, and did not provide formal initiation (diksha), despite requests. Some of Sai Baba's notable disciples include Mahalsapathi, Madhav Rao (Shama), Nanasaheb Peshway, Bayijabai, Tatya Kote Patil, Kakasaheb Dixit, Radhakrishna Maai, Hemadpant, Bhuti, Das Ganu, Lakshmi Bai, Nanavali, Abdul Baba, Sapatanekar, Nanasaheb Chandodkar, B.V. Narashima Swamiji. Some disciples became well-known spiritual figures, such as Upasani Maharaj of Sakori. After the death of Sai Baba, his devotees offered the daily Aarti to Upasani Maharaj when he paid a visit to Shirdi twice within 10 years.

=== Hindus ===
The Hindu saint Anandanath of Yewala called Sai Baba a "precious diamond." Another saint, Gangagir, said "Blessed is Shirdi, that it got this precious jewel." Sri Beedkar Maharaj greatly revered Sai Baba and when he met him in 1873, bestowed the title Jagad guru upon him. Sai Baba was also greatly respected by Vasudevananda Saraswati (known as Tembye Swami). He was also revered by a group of Shaivic yogis, known as the Nath-Panchayat.

=== Muslims ===
Abdul Baba was a close devotee of Sai Baba and was the caretaker of the shrine from 1918 to 1922. A large number of Muslim devotees used to come to the shrine until the 1980s. In states like Maharashtra, Andhra Pradesh, and Karnataka, it is not uncommon to see Muslims visiting Sai Baba temples, participating in the Thursday prayers, and contributing to charity in his name.

=== Parsis ===
Shirdi Sai Baba was revered by prominent Zoroastrians such as Nanabhoy Palkhivala, Farhaad Panthaky, and Homi Bhabha, and has been cited as the Zoroastrians' most popular non-Zoroastrian religious figure.

Meher Baba, who was born into a Zoroastrian family, met Sai Baba in December 1915 and considered this event among the most significant in his life. Shri Sai Satcharita (Sai Baba's life story) makes no mention of Meher Baba, but in Lord Meher, the life story of Meher Baba, there are numerous references to Sai Baba. Meher Baba declared Sai Baba to be a Qutub-e-Irshad, or the highest of the five Qutubs, a "Master of the Universe" in Meher Baba's spiritual hierarchy.

== In culture ==
=== Sacred art and architecture ===
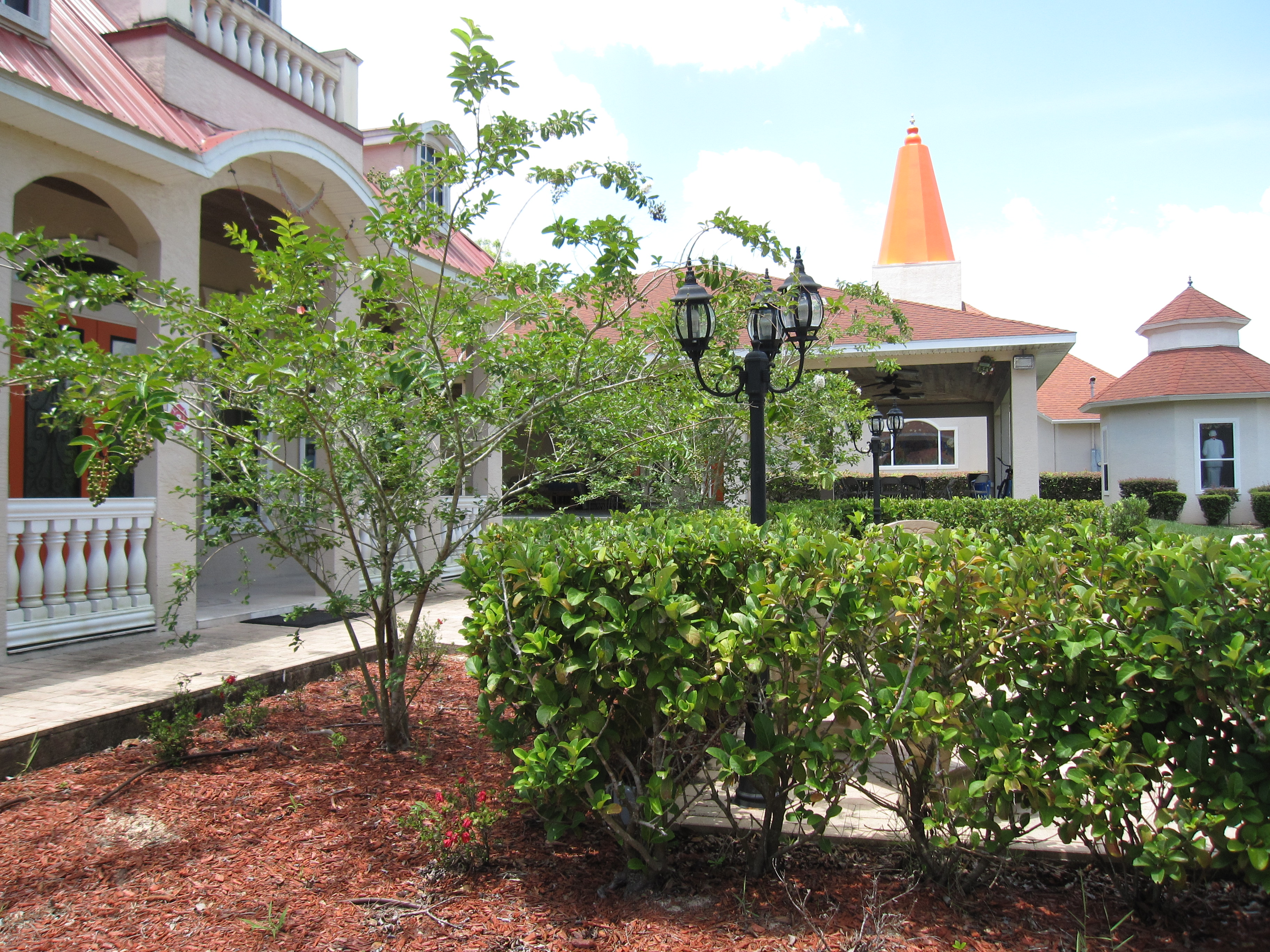
Shirdi Sai Temple in Inverness, Florida, US

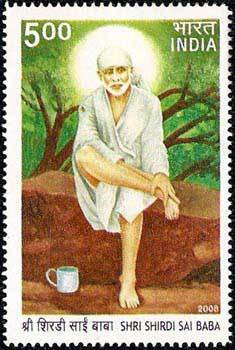
Stamp of India - 2008 Sri Shirdi Sai Baba

There are many temples of Shirdi Sai Baba in India. Temples are also located in countries outside India, including the United States, Trinidad and Tobago, Guyana, Suriname, Fiji, Mauritius, South Africa, Netherlands, Kenya, Benin, Cuba, Canada, Pakistan, Australia, United Kingdom, Germany, Japan and New Zealand. In the mosque in Shirdi where Sai Baba lived, there is a life-size portrait of him by Shama Rao Jaykar, an artist from Mumbai. There are numerous monuments and statues, designed to serve a religious function, of Sai Baba of Shirdi. One of these, made of marble by a sculptor named Balaji Vasant Talim, is in the Samadhi Mandir in Shirdi where Sai Baba was buried.

In 2008, India Post issued a commemorative postage stamp of ₹5 to honour Shirdi Sai Baba.

=== Film and television ===
Sai Baba has been the subject of feature films in various languages produced by the Indian film industry.

Year	Film	Title role	Director	Language	Ref(s)
1955	Shirdi Che Sai Baba	Dattopant Aangre	Kumarsen Samarth	Marathi	
1977	Shirdi Ke Sai Baba	Sudhir Dalvi	Ashok V. Bhushan	Hindi	
1986	Sri Shirdi Saibaba Mahathyam	Vijayachander	K. Vasu	Telugu	
1989	Bhagavan Shri Sai Baba	Sai Prakash	Sai Prakash	Kannada	
1993	Sai Baba	Yashwant Dutt	Babasaheb S. Fattelal	Marathi	
1999	Maya / Guru Poornima / Jayasurya		Rama Narayanan	Tamil; Telugu; Kannada	
2000	Sri Sai Mahima	Sai Prakash	Ashok Kumar	Telugu	
2001	Shirdi Sai Baba	Sudhir Dalvi	Deepak Balraj Vij	Hindi	
2005	Ishwarya Avatar Sai Baba	Mukul Nag	Ramanand Sagar	Hindi	
2010	Malik Ek	Jackie Shroff	Deepak Balraj Vij	Hindi	
2010–11	Bhagwan Sri Shirdi Sai Baba	Surya Vasishta	Bukkapatna Vasu	Kannada	
2012	Shirdi Sai	Nagarjuna Akkineni	K. Raghavendra Rao	Telugu	
2017–2023	Mere Sai	Abeer Soofi; Tushar Dalvi	Sachin P. Ambre; Harsh Agarwal	Hindi	

== See also ==
- List of Hindu gurus and saints
- Apotheosis
